= Simon (Sutcliff novel) =

Children's historical novel by Rosemary Sutcliff

- First edition cover
- Author: Rosemary Sutcliff
- Illustrator: Richard Kennedy
- Cover artist: William Stobbs
- Language: English
- Genre: Historical novel
- Publisher: Oxford University Press
- Publication date: 1953
- Publication place: United Kingdom
- Media type: Print (Hardback)
- Preceded by: Brother Dusty-Feet
- Followed by: The Eagle of the Ninth

Simon is a children's historical novel written by Rosemary Sutcliff, first published in 1953. It is set during the First English Civil War, primarily focusing on the final campaign of 1645-1646 in the West Country and shows the effect of the conflict on two friends, who find themselves on opposite sides.

== Plot summary ==
Apart from 'The Chronicles of Robin Hood,' Sutcliff's three previous novels, The Queen Elizabeth Story, The Armourer's House and Brother Dusty-Feet were aimed at a younger audience and set in the 16th century. 'Simon' shows a significant shift in both tone and subject matter and is generally acknowledged to be the first to feature the mastery of subject and style for which she is now remembered.

The story begins in the West Devon town of Torrington, on the eve of the First English Civil War in 1642. The protagonists are Simon Carey, son of a local farmer who supports Parliament and his best friend, Amias Hannaford, son of the Royalist town doctor. The two friends fall out when the war begins; Simon's father goes off to fight for Parliament but orders him to finish school first.

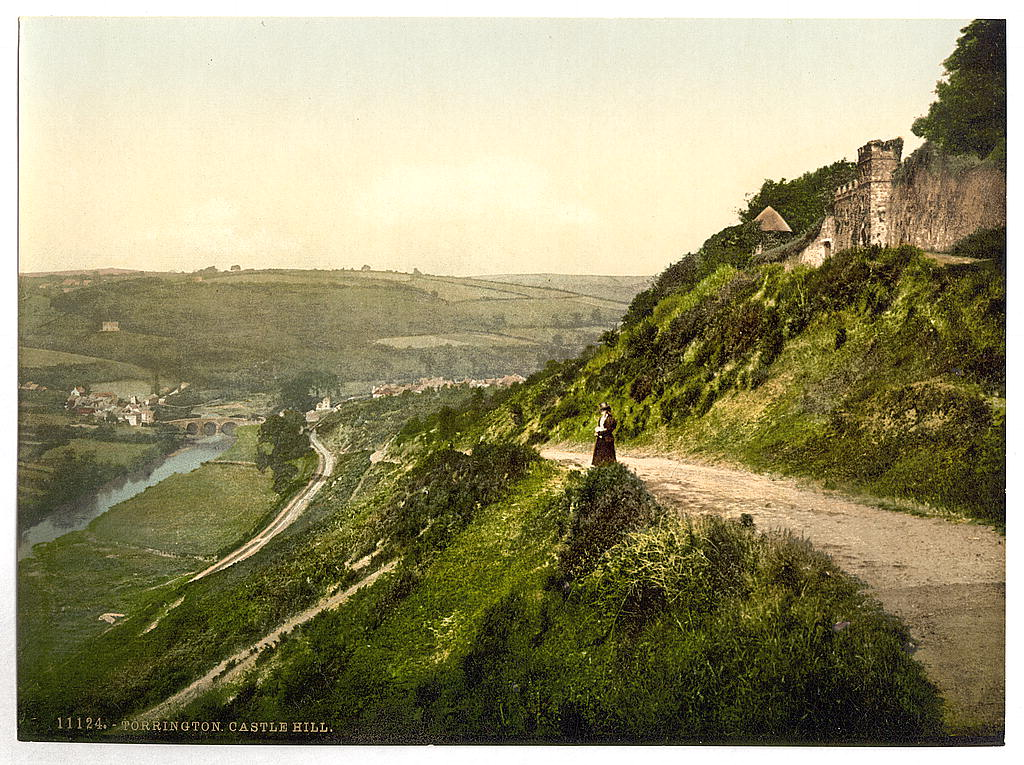
Castle Hill, Torrington ca. 1890 - 1900; in the novel, Simon pursues the retreating Royalists down this hill.

Amias joins the Royalist forces in April 1644, while Simon helps a regiment of Parliamentary cavalry escape after their defeat at Lostwithiel in September. With the help of an officer he met then, he joins the New Model Army in early 1645 as a Cornet in the regiment of the Army commander, Sir Thomas Fairfax. His corporal is an Ironside trooper called Zeal-for-the-Lord Relf.

The story covers the decisive Parliamentary victory at Naseby in June 1645; when Zeal-for-the-Lord deserts to seek revenge on a former friend, he is flogged and dismissed from the army. The rest of the book covers the final campaign in the West Country; Simon takes part in the July 1645 Battle of Langport, then helps capture a house at Okeham Paine held by the Royalists, where he finds himself fighting against Amias. He is badly wounded and then sent home as a scout to gather information on the Royalist army led by Ralph Hopton; here he meets again with both Amias and Zeal-for-the-Lord, who is now with the Royalists and gives him the information he needs.

Simon rejoins the army for the Battle of Torrington; this results in a Parliamentary victory but a huge explosion blows up the church, killing over 200 prisoners. Simon helps the injured Amias, who is suspected of causing the explosion and is also arrested for 'harbouring the enemy.' Zeal-for-the-Lord is one of the wounded recovered from the explosion and before he dies, helps clear Amias. Simon is also freed and the story ends four years later in 1649, after the Second English Civil War, with the two resuming their friendship.

In 'Simon,' Sutcliff addresses a theme that re-appears in many of her works ie that of conflicting personal and societal loyalties and what keeping faith with one can mean for the other. Thomas Fairfax also appears in Sutcliff's novel 'Rider of the White Horse,' written from the perspective of his wife Anne Fairfax.

== Historical background ==
Rosemary Sutcliff wrote that it is a fiction based on real events; "Most history books deal with the final campaign of the civil war in a single paragraph, and the Battle of Torrington they seldom mention at all. In this story I have tried to show what that final campaign in the west was like, and to re-fight the battles fought over my own countryside. Most of the people I've written about really lived; Torrington Church really did blow up, with 200 Royalist prisoners and their Parliamentary Guard inside, and no one has ever known how it happened, though Chaplain Joshua Sprigg left it on record that the deed was done by 'one Watts, a desperate villain.'"

While the fact of the explosion is historically correct, other sources claim the prisoners were Parliamentary soldiers held by the Royalists (Sutcliff has it the other way round), while the actual number killed is unclear. The battle itself features in local historical re-enactments.
