= The Mark of the Horse Lord =

1965 historical novel for children by Rosemary Sutcliff

- First edition
- Author: Rosemary Sutcliff
- Language: English
- Genre: Children's historical novel
- Publisher: OUP
- Publication date: 1965
- Publication place: United Kingdom
- Media type: Print (hardback)

The Mark of the Horse Lord is a 1965 historical novel for children written by Rosemary Sutcliff. It won the first Phoenix Award in 1985.

It takes place in Roman Britain and tells the tale of a gladiator who becomes involved with the Dal Riada of Earra-Ghàidheal. Like many Sutcliff novels, the plot is driven by a crisis of leadership, hinging on acceptance of the ultimate responsibility of a sacrificial king.

== Plot summary ==
The story revolves around slave-gladiator Red Phaedrus, a red haired half Roman, half Celt. He receives his wooden-foil, i.e. his freedom after winning a fight-to-the-death in the arena of Corstopitum (the most northerly town in the Roman Empire). He is soon after approached by representatives of the Dal Riada, who ask him to impersonate their king in an effort to win back tribal leadership from a usurper queen. Phaedrus is persuaded, accepts the role of Midir, the original prince whose eyes were put out by the queen, preventing him from ruling, and receives a signifying tattoo on his forehead, the eponymous Mark of the Horse Lord. The stage is then set for a struggle between King and Queen, between Dal Riada and Caledones, between the Sun God and the Great Mother; a theme used in many Sutcliff novels.

Phaedrus spends time in a town on the Northern Wall, learning his role from the original prince Midir and the culture of the Celts. Several historical subjects are discussed, including Lollius Urbicus and the laying-waste of Valentia after subjugation, the Pax Romana and its effects, Calgacus's battles against General Agricola, and the viewpoints of Tacitus on all of this.

A revolt ensues against the Queen, and the Dal Riada capital of Dun Monaidh is retaken, but the queen escapes to her kin amongst the Caledones. Phaedrus is crowned king in a ceremony where he places one foot on the carved footprint of previous kings. He lives among the Dal Riada, developing trust and understanding with some who recognise him for an impostor, most who do not.

A war ensues between the Dal Riada and the Caledones, who are portrayed as Picts. The fighting occurs across the countryside around Cruachan (described as the Shield boss of the World), as the Dal Riada struggle to defend their frontier. Other geographical features encountered include Loch Abha, Loch Fhiona, the Cluta, the Firth of the War Boats, and Glen Croe.

The Dal Riada eventually win, the Caledones are dispersed, but the Queen flees and finds refuge in a Roman frontier fort. An attempt to assassinate the Queen is made with the help of the true Midir, in which both die, and Phaedrus is captured by the Romans. He is offered freedom at a great cost to the Dal Riada, referencing back to the discussions of Pax Romana and Roman treatment of the native tribes. Phaedrus instead opts to sacrifice himself for the survival of his adopted people, punctuating the concept of responsibility and the sacrificial king developed throughout the novel.

The theme of the novel is built around an individual struggling to find identity and belonging, similar to Sutcliff novels such as Outcast and Dawn Wind, revolving around conflicting cultures, and the duties assumed and performed by individuals within those cultures. The duties of a king are shown in many of her novels, including Sword at Sunset and Sun Horse, Moon Horse, and have been credited as being influenced by James Frazer's The Golden Bough.

The novel also contains elements of Anthony Hope's earlier Ruritanian novel of a substitute prince, The Prisoner of Zenda. The red hair of both substituting heroes is just one of the resemblances.

== Awards ==
The Mark of the Horse Lord won the inaugural, 1985 Phoenix Award from the Children's Literature Association as the best English-language children's book that did not win a major contemporary award when it was originally published twenty years earlier. It is named for the mythical bird phoenix, which is reborn from its ashes, to suggest the book's rise from obscurity.
