= Walter Raleigh in popular culture =

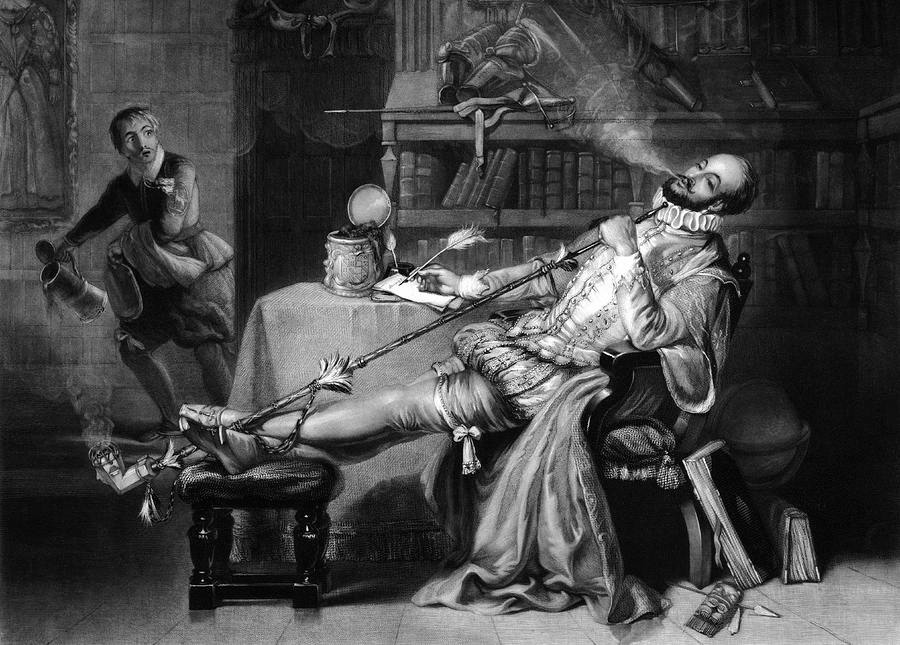
Raleigh's First Pipe in England, 1859

Sir Walter Raleigh (c. 1554 – 29 October 1618) was an English gentleman, writer, poet, soldier, courtier, spy, and explorer, well known for popularising tobacco in England.

== Art, entertainment, and media ==
=== Films ===
- Vincent Price portrayed Raleigh in The Private Lives of Elizabeth and Essex (1939). The cast also included Bette Davis and Errol Flynn as Queen Elizabeth I and Robert Devereux, 2nd Earl of Essex, respectively.
- Leslie Bradley portrayed Raleigh in the comedy Time Flies (1944).
- Richard Todd portrayed Raleigh in the film, The Virgin Queen (1955); Davis reprised her role as the titular queen.
- Edward Everett Horton portrayed Sir Walter Raleigh in the film The Story of Mankind (1957).
- The Historie of the VVorld / In Five Bookes, of which only the first volume was completed before Raleigh's execution, is the source of the title of the Mel Brooks parody film History of the World, Part I (1981).
- He is portrayed by Clive Owen in Elizabeth: The Golden Age (2007). Elizabeth "Bess" Throckmorton, portrayed by Abbie Cornish, was also a featured character in this sequel to Elizabeth (1998), which focuses on the relationships of Elizabeth I (portrayed by Cate Blanchett) and Bess with Raleigh. The film also takes liberty with Bess and Raleigh marrying prior to the Spanish Armada (1588), though in fact the couple married in 1591.

=== Games ===
- Raleigh is a playable character in the video game Jamestown.
- Raleigh is the default character of England in the Microprose game Sid Meier's Colonization.

=== Literature ===
- According to 1066 and All That, James I, with his "logical and tidy mind" had Raleigh executed "for being left over from the previous reign."
- He is one of the principal characters in Winston Graham's historical novel The Grove of Eagles (1963).
- He is a character in Gloriana's Torch (2003), Patricia Finney's third novel in the Elizabethan spy thriller David Becket and Simon Ames Series.
- He is the main character in Robert Nye's historical novel The Voyage of the Destiny (1982)
- In The Loss of El Dorado: A Colonial History by V. S. Naipaul
- Rosemary Sutcliff's 1956 novel Lady in Waiting, about Raleigh's wife Bess Throckmorton, features him as a major character.
- Bob Newhart's monologue "Introducing Tobacco to Civilisation" takes the form of a telephone conversation between "Nutty Walt" Raleigh and a sceptical business associate.

=== Music ===
- John Lennon of The Beatles describes Raleigh as "a stupid get" due to his popularization of smoking in the song "I'm So Tired" on The White Album (1968).
- Raleigh is mentioned in the second "commercial" on P. D. Q. Bach's Report from Hoople: P. D. Q. Bach on the Air (1967), and credited with providing the composer with a recipe for a special blend of tobacco that will "give no end of reason to be jolly".

=== Operas ===
- Raleigh is a main character in Edward German's comic opera Merrie England (1902);
- Raleigh appears as a character in Benjamin Britten's opera Gloriana, Op. 53 (1953).

=== Stage plays ===
- In the late 1940s to early 1950s, actor and comedian Andy Griffith appeared as Sir Walter Raleigh, alongside other cast members in the stage play The Lost Colony.

=== Television ===
- Simon Jones portrayed Raleigh in the Potato (1986) episode of the BBC sitcom Blackadder II.
- Ronald Pickup portrayed Raleigh in the TV film My Friend Walter (1992).
- Simon Farnaby / Mathew Baynton portrayed Raleigh in the educational comedy TV series Horrible Histories.
- Joseph Mawle portrayed Raleigh in TV series Mary & George (2024)

== Locations ==
- Raleigh, North Carolina is the capital of the American State of North Carolina, one of the original Thirteen Colonies. The city was named in honour of Sir Walter Raleigh.
- Raleigh County, West Virginia is named after Sir Walter Raleigh. Alfred Beckley, the founder of the Raleigh county seat, said he did it to honour Raleigh for "the "enterprising and far-seeing patron of the earliest attempts to colonize our old Mother State of Virginia."
- Raleighvallen are a series of falls in the Coppenameriver, in the district of Sipaliwini in Suriname. It was named in honour of Sir Walter Raleigh due to his expeditions in the Guianas. Raleigh Vallen Airstrip (IATA: SMRA) is an airstrip serving the Central Suriname Nature Reserve, Suriname. The runway is on Fungu Tabiki, an island in the Coppename River.

== Brands and enterprises ==
- Raleigh Cigarettes were a popular brand during the 1950s and 1960s as was Sir Walter Raleigh Tobacco during the 20th century.

== Myths ==
Raleigh allegedly laid his cloak over a puddle so Queen Elizabeth I would not get her feet wet. The story is generally considered to be apocryphal.
