= Cheapside =

Street in the City of London

Coordinates: 51.5141°N 0.0937°W

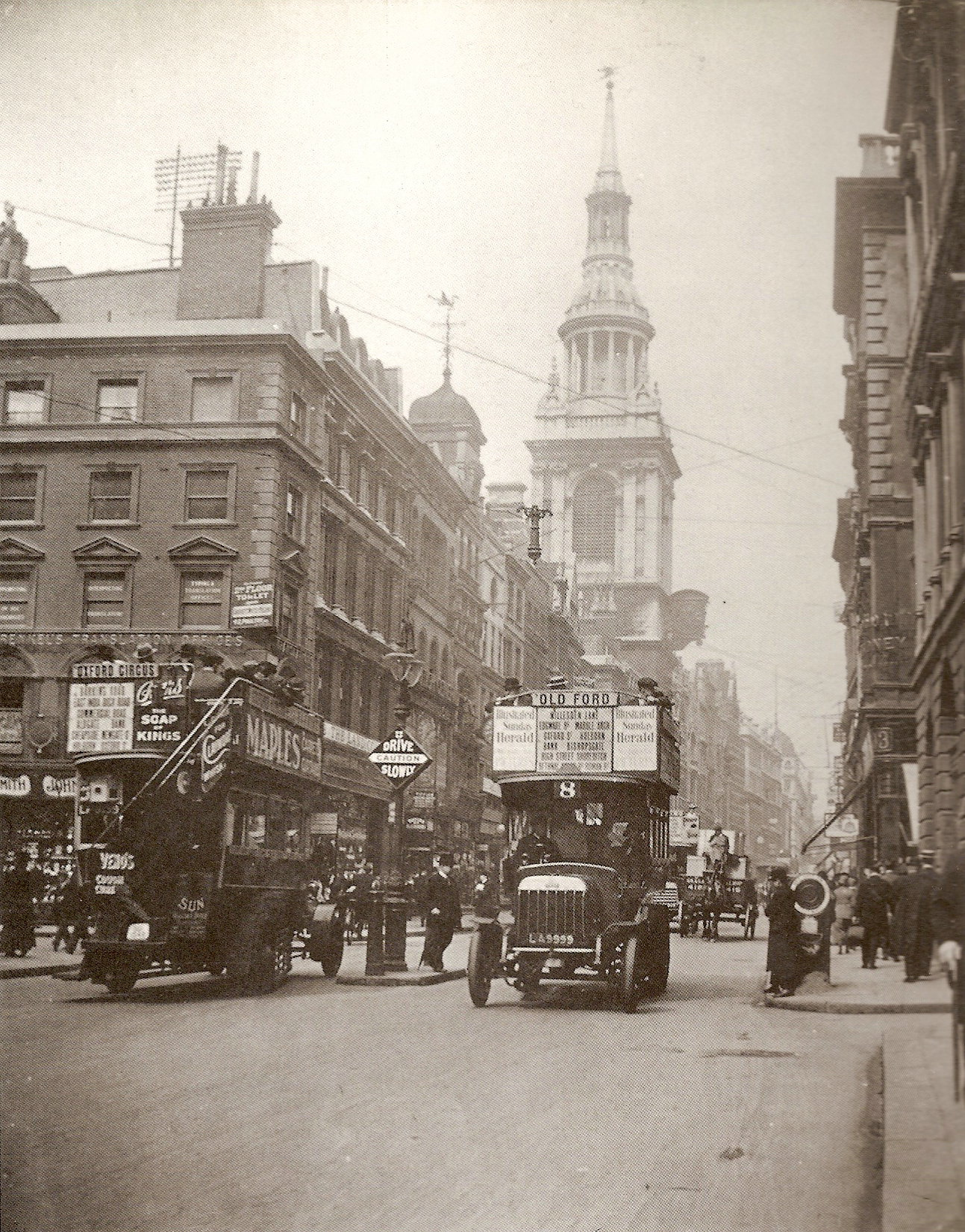
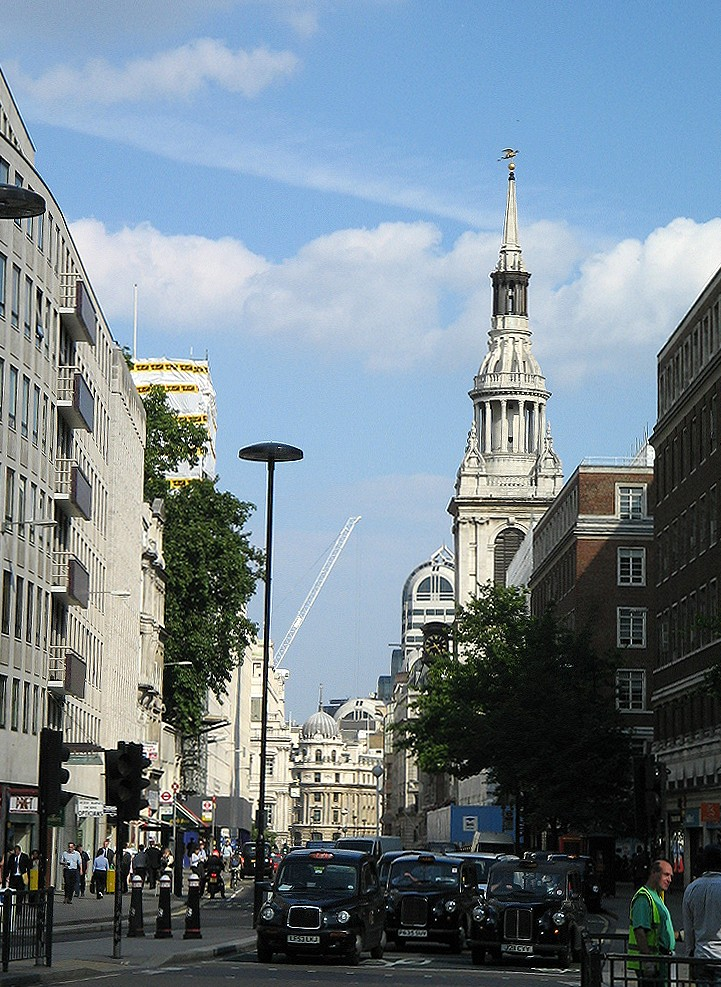
Cheapside, looking west in 1909 at left and looking east in 2005 at right. The church in the background of each is St Mary-le-Bow, designed by Sir Christopher Wren.

Cheapside is a street in the City of London, the historic and modern financial centre of London, England, which forms part of the A40 London to Fishguard road. It links St Martin's Le Grand with Poultry. Near its eastern end at Bank Junction, where it becomes Poultry, is Mansion House, the Bank of England, and Bank station. To the west is St Paul's Cathedral, St Paul's tube station and square.

In the Middle Ages, it was known as Westcheap, as opposed to Eastcheap, another street in the City, near London Bridge. The boundaries of the wards of Cheap, Cordwainer and Bread Street run along Cheapside and Poultry; prior to boundary changes in 2003 the road was divided amongst Farringdon Within and Cripplegate wards in addition to the current three.

The contemporary Cheapside is the location of a range of retail and food outlets and offices, as well as the City's only major shopping centre, One New Change.

== Etymology and usage ==
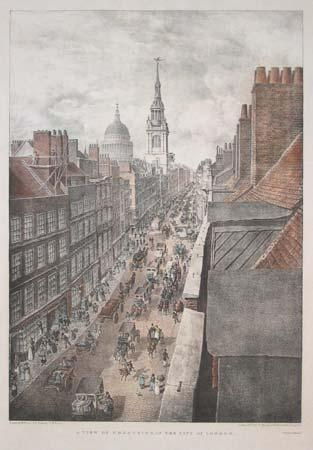
Cheapside in 1823, looking west towards St Paul's Cathedral

Cheapside is a common English street name, meaning "market place", from Old English ceapan, "to buy" (cf. German kaufen, Dutch kopen, Danish købe, Norwegian kjøpe, Swedish köpa), whence also chapman and chapbook. There was originally no connection to the modern meaning of cheap ("low-priced" or "low-quality", a shortening of good ceap, "good buy"), though by the 18th century this association may have begun to be inferred.

Other cities and towns in England that have a Cheapside include Ambleside, Ascot, Barnsley, Birmingham, Blackpool, Bradford, Brighton, Bristol, Derby, Halifax, Hanley, Knaresborough, Lancaster, Leicester, Liverpool, Luton, Manchester, Middleton, Normanton, Nottingham, Preston, Reading, Settle, Worksop, Wakefield and Wolverhampton. There is also a Cheapside in Bridgetown, Barbados; Lexington, Kentucky, US; Greenfield, Massachusetts, US; Saint Helier, Jersey; and London, Ontario, Canada.

== History ==
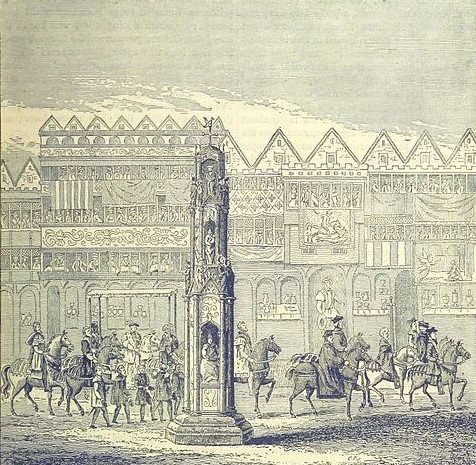
The 1547 coronation procession of Edward VI passing the Eleanor cross in Cheapside (West Cheap)

Cheapside is the former site of one of the principal produce markets in London, cheap broadly meaning "market" in medieval English. Many of the streets feeding into the main thoroughfare are named after the produce that was once sold in those areas of the market, including Honey Lane, Milk Street, Bread Street and Poultry.

In medieval times, the royal processional route from the Tower of London to the Palace of Westminster would include Cheapside. During state occasions such as the first entry of Margaret of France (second wife of King Edward I), into London in September 1299, the conduits of Cheapside customarily flowed with wine.

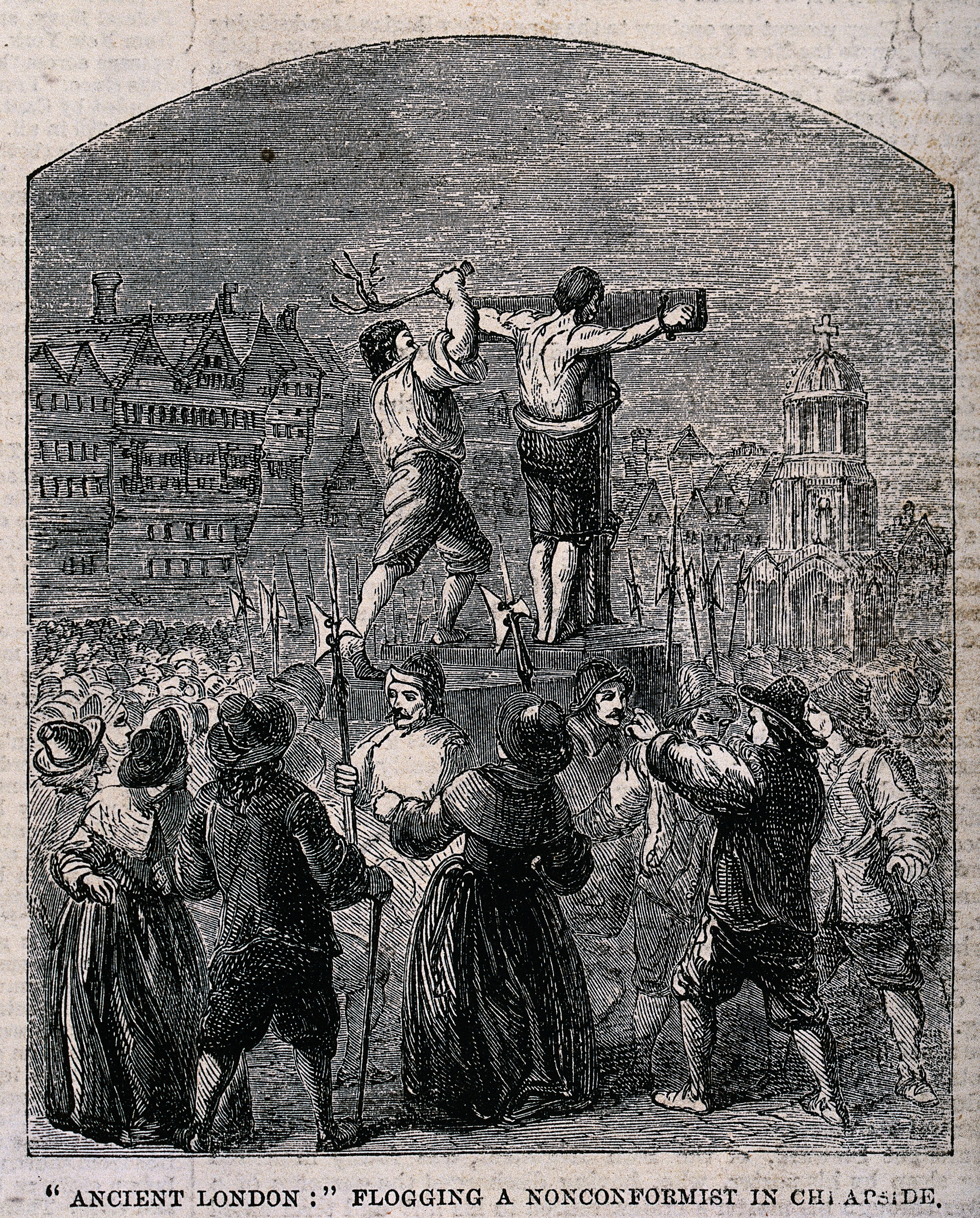
Flagellation of a nonconformist in Cheapside in 1685

During the reign of Edward III in the 14th century, tournaments were held in adjacent fields. The dangers were, however, not limited to the participants: a wooden stand built to accommodate Queen Philippa and her companions collapsed during a tournament to celebrate the birth of the Black Prince in 1330. No one died, but the King was greatly displeased, and the stand's builders would have been put to death but for the Queen's intercession.

In the early 1300s one of the armourers working in the area was Alice la Haubergere, who owned an armour shop and made her role within the occupation part of her identity, which was unusual for the period.

On the day preceding her coronation, in January 1559, Elizabeth I passed through a number of London streets in a pre-coronation procession and was entertained by a number of pageants, including one in Cheapside.

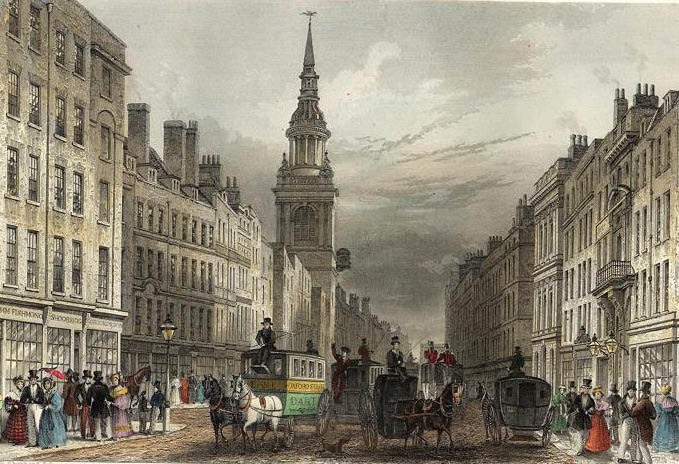
A view of Cheapside published in 1837

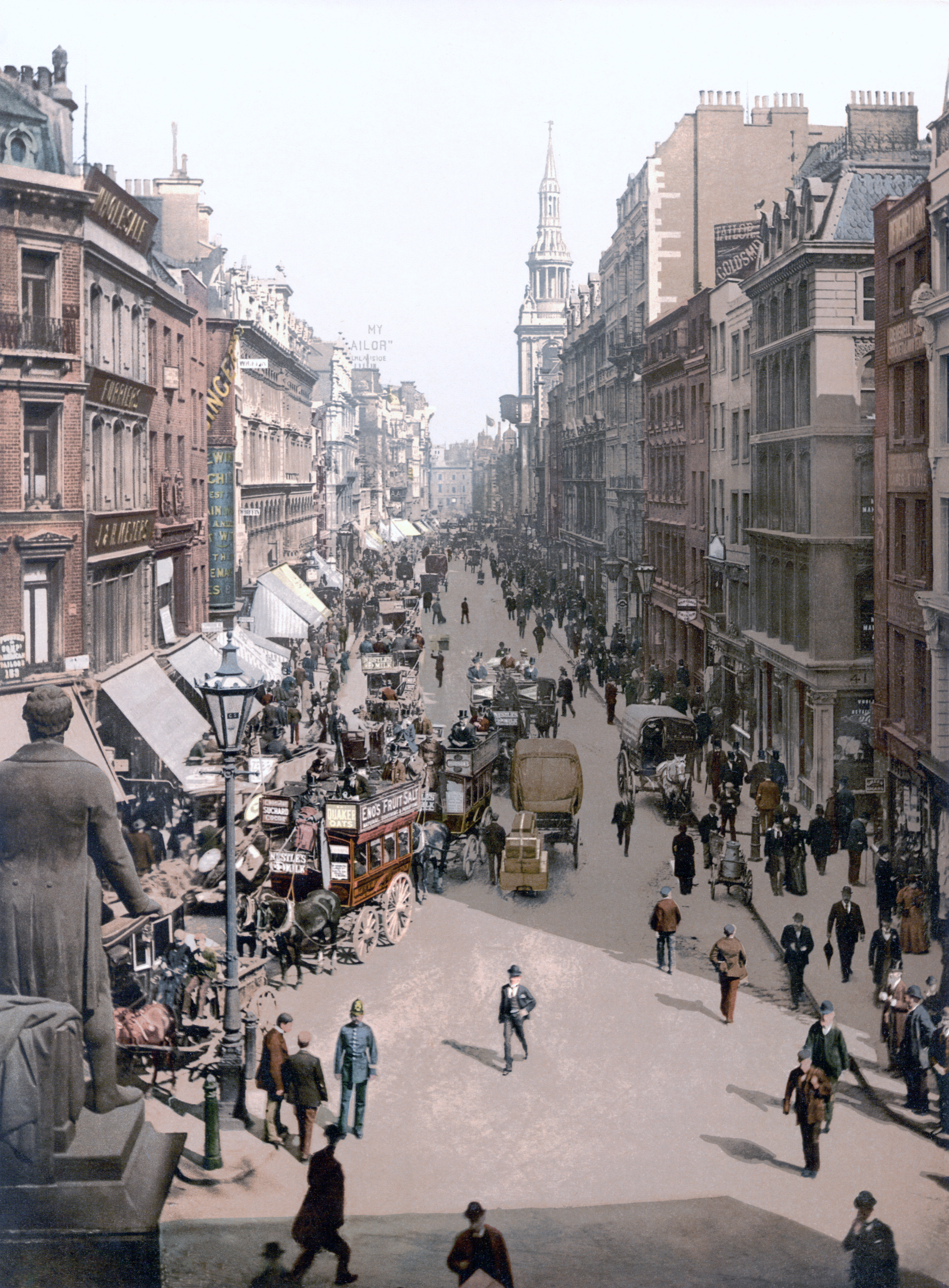
Photochrom of Cheapside, c. 1890–1900

Meat was brought in to Cheapside from Smithfield market, just outside Newgate. After the great Church of St Michael-le-Querne, the top end of the street broadened into a dual carriageway known as the Shambles (referring to an open-air slaughterhouse and meat market), with butcher shops on both sides and a dividing central area also containing butchers. Further down, on the right, was Goldsmiths Row, an area of commodity dealers. From the 14th century to the Great Fire, the eastern end of Cheapside was the location of the Great Conduit.

== Literary connections ==
Cheapside was the birthplace of both John Milton and Robert Herrick. It was for a long time one of the most important streets in London. It is also the site of the 'Bow Bells', the church of St Mary-le-Bow, which has played a part in London's Cockney heritage and the tale of Dick Whittington. Geoffrey Chaucer grew up around Cheapside and there are a scattering of references to the thoroughfare and its environs throughout his work. The first chapter of Peter Ackroyd's Brief Lives series on Chaucer also colourfully describes the street at that time.

William Shakespeare used Cheapside as the setting for several bawdy scenes in Henry IV, Part I. A reference to it is also made in Henry VI, Part II, in a speech by the rebel Jack Cade: "all the realm shall be in common; and in Cheapside shall my palfrey go to grass".

Thomas Middleton's play A Chaste Maid in Cheapside (1613) both satirises and celebrates the citizens of the neighbourhood during the Renaissance, when the street hosted the city's goldsmiths.

William Wordsworth, in his 1797 poem The Reverie of Poor Susan, imagines a naturalistic Cheapside of past:

And a river flows on through the vale of Cheapside.

Jane Austen, in her 1813 novel Pride and Prejudice, characterises Cheapside as a London neighbourhood frowned upon by the landed elite:

"I think I have heard you say that their uncle is an attorney in Meryton."

"Yes; and they have another, who lives somewhere near Cheapside."

"That is capital," added her sister, and they both laughed heartily.

"If they had uncles enough to fill all Cheapside," cried Bingley, "it would not make them one jot less agreeable."

"But it must very materially lessen their chance of marrying men of any consideration in the world," replied Darcy.

Charles Dickens Jr. wrote in his 1879 book Dickens's Dictionary of London:

Cheapside remains now what it was five centuries ago, the greatest thoroughfare in the City of London. Other localities have had their day, have risen, become fashionable, and have sunk into obscurity and neglect, but Cheapside has maintained its place, and may boast of being the busiest thoroughfare in the world, with the sole exception perhaps of London-bridge.

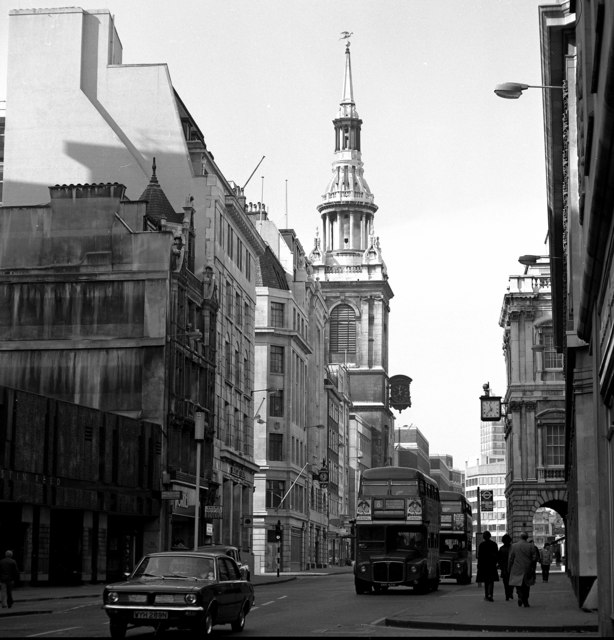
Cheapside in 1979

Hugh Lofting's book Doctor Dolittle, published in 1920, names a quarrelsome London sparrow with a Cockney accent Cheapside. He lives most of the year in St Edmund's left ear in St Paul's Cathedral and is invited to the African country of Fantippo to deliver mail to cities because the other birds are not able to navigate city streets.

Cheapside is also depicted in Rosemary Sutcliff's 1951 children's historical novel The Armourer's House, along with other parts of Tudor London.

In a more contemporary treatment, the Cheapside of the Middle Ages was referenced in a derogatory sense in the 2001 movie A Knight's Tale as being the poor, unhealthy and low-class birthplace and home of the unlikely hero.

Nineteenth century Cheapside is presented as the home of Mary "Jacky" Faber in Bloody Jack by L. A. Meyer.

Additionally, Cheapside is a major location in the bestselling historical novel by Maria McCann, As Meat Loves Salt, which is set in the English Civil War.

William Gibson's mystery novel The Peripheral depicts a 22nd-century Cheapside converted to a Victorian-era cosplay zone where only 19th century costume is allowed.

== Contemporary Cheapside ==
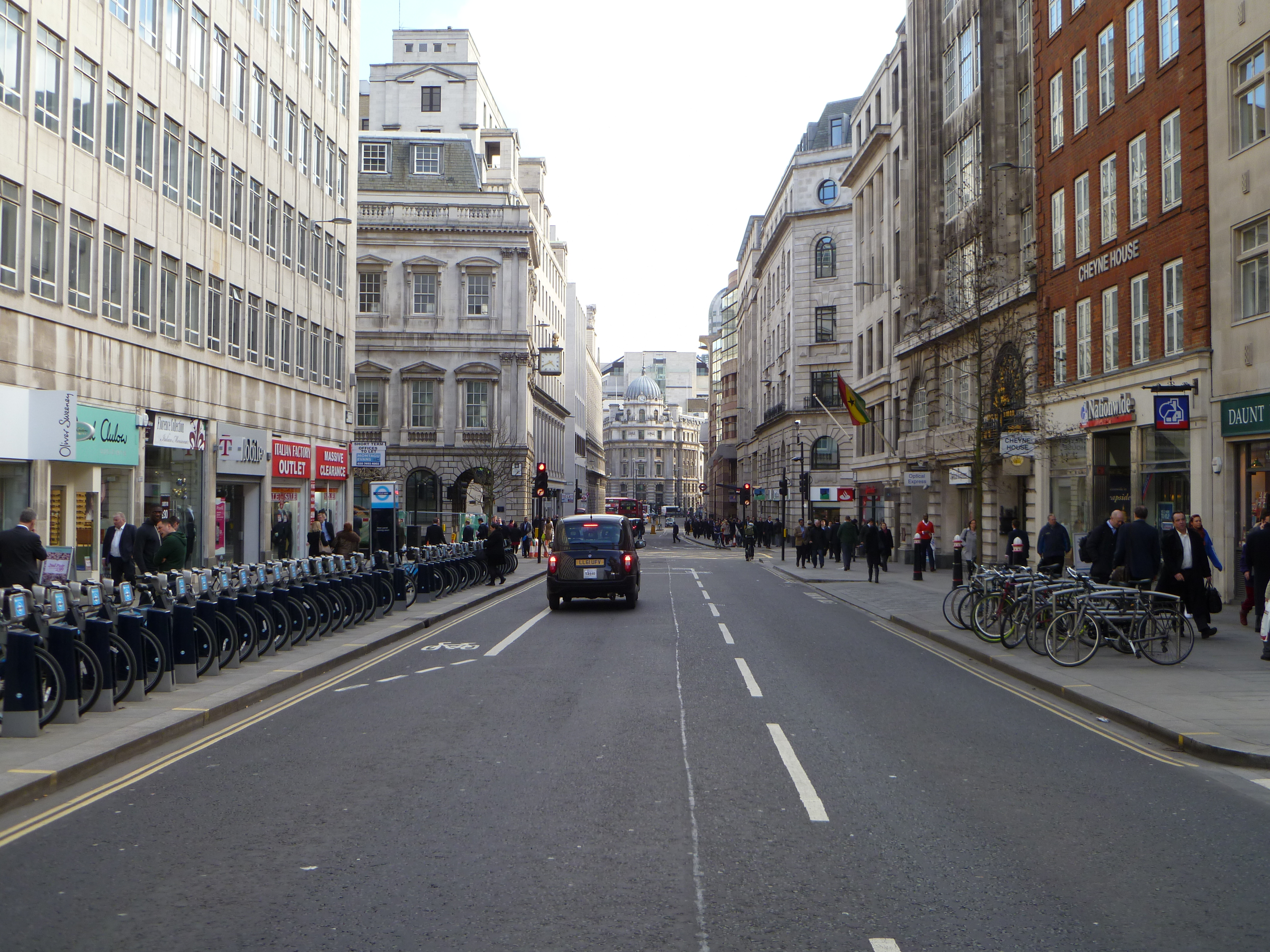
Cheapside in 2012

Cheapside today is a street of offices and developments of retail outlets. It can no longer be described as "the busiest thoroughfare in the world" (as in Charles Dickens, Jr.'s day) and is instead simply one of many routes connecting the East End and the City of London with the West End.

Cheapside was extensively damaged during The Blitz in late 1940 and particularly during the Second Great Fire of London. Much of the rebuilding following these raids occurred during the 1950s and 1960s and included a number of unsympathetic contemporary attempts at recreating the centuries-old architecture that had been destroyed. In recent years many of these buildings have themselves been demolished as a programme of regeneration takes place along Cheapside from Paternoster Square to Poultry.

The draft Core Strategy of the City's Local Development Frameworks outlines the vision and policies for the Cheapside area, aiming to increase the amount of retail space along and near the street, and make the area a good environment for visitors and shoppers. The plan is to re-establish the street as the City's "High Street", including as a weekend shopping destination (until recently many retail units in the City were closed on Saturday and Sunday). A major retail and office development at the heart of the scheme, One New Change, opened 28 October 2010. It is sited on Cheapside at the intersection with New Change, immediately to the east of St Paul's Cathedral.

To address the anticipated rise in the number of shoppers as a result of the regeneration, the street itself has undergone reconstruction works to make the area more sympathetic to pedestrian traffic; the works are expected to make Cheapside the main shopping area in the City of London.

Cheapside formed part of the marathon course of the 2012 Olympic and Paralympic Games. The women's Olympic marathon took place on 5 August and the men's Olympic marathon took place on 12 August. The four Paralympic marathons were held on 9 September.

== See also ==
- Eleanor cross
