= C. Walter Hodges =

English artist and illustrator (1909–2004)

C. Walter Hodges

Cyril Walter Hodges (18 March 1909 – 26 November 2004) was an English artist and writer best known for illustrating children's books and for helping to recreate Elizabethan theatre. He won the annual Greenaway Medal for British children's book illustration in 1964.

== Career ==
Cyril Walter Hodges was born in Beckenham, Kent, the son of Cyril Hodges, "a leading figure in advertising and copyrighting". He was educated at Dulwich College, which he recalled as "a wretched imprisonment", and at Goldsmiths' College of Art. Hodges fell in love with Greta Becker, a hopeful ballet dancer, and they married in 1936. She provided "complete domestic support" until she died in 1999.

Hodges spent most of his career as a freelance illustrator. For many years he did line drawings for the Radio Times. He also produced its 1938 Christmas edition. Among the writers for children with whom he collaborated as an illustrator were Ian Serraillier, Rosemary Sutcliff (The Eagle of the Ninth), Rhoda Power (Redcap Runs Away), Elizabeth Goudge (The Little White Horse) and William Mayne.

During a year spent in New York he wrote and illustrated Columbus Sails (1939), a work of historical fiction for children. It proved popular on both sides of the Atlantic. Its success eventually led to several others including The Namesake: A Story Of King Alfred and its sequel The Marsh King; Magna Carta; The Norman Conquest; and The Spanish Armada (1964 to 1967). The Namesake was a commended runner up for the annual Carnegie Medal, which recognises the author of the year's best British children's book. (Note: Since 1995 there are usually eight books on the Carnegie Medal shortlist. According to CCSU, some runners up were Commended (from 1959) or Highly Commended (from 1974). There were about 160 commendations of both kinds in 49 years from 1954 to 2002, including Hodges and three others for 1964.)

== Theatre ==
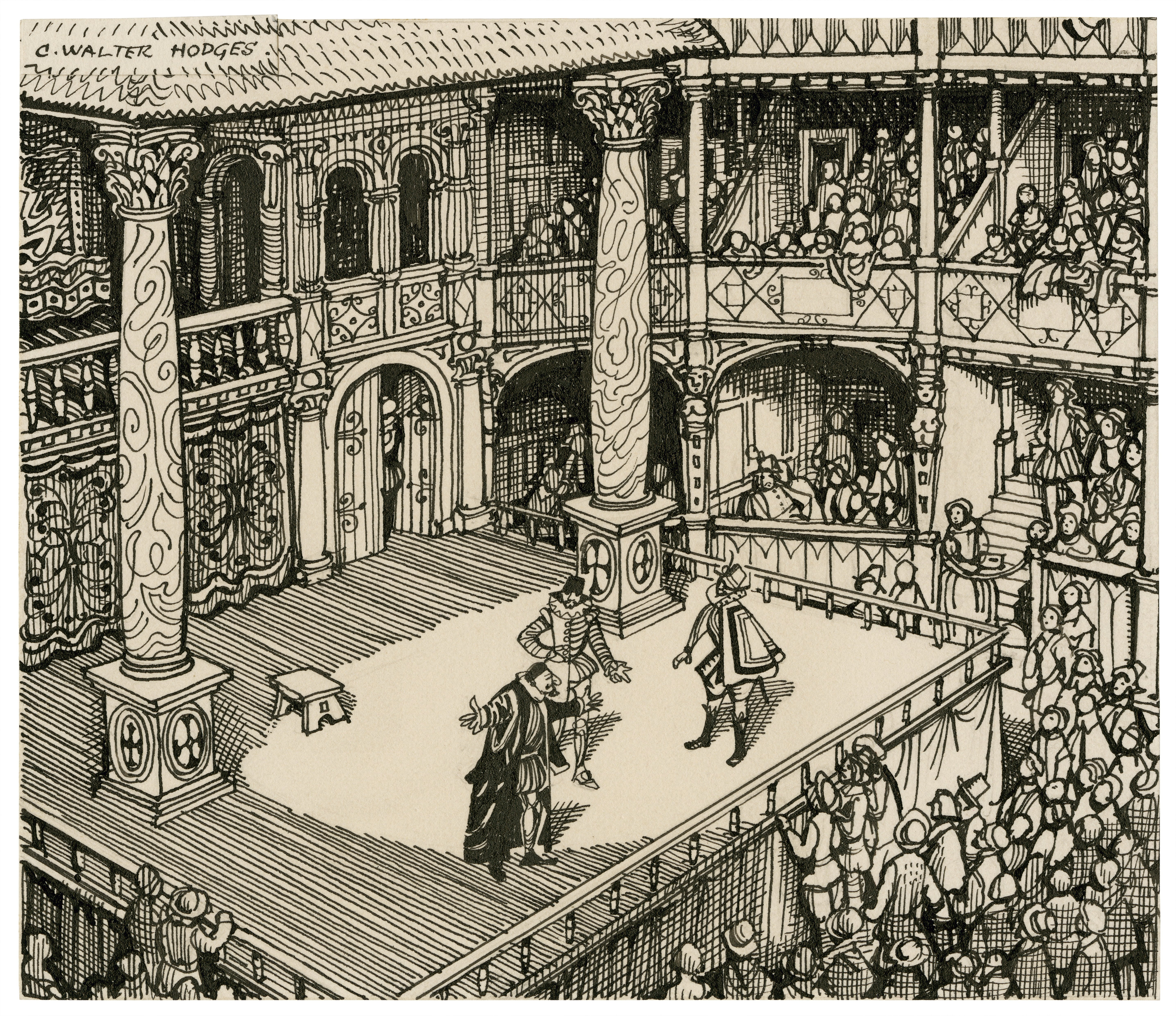
Hodges' imagined view of an Elizabethan performance

Hodges designed costumes and scenery for the Everyman Theatre, Liverpool (1928–30) and for the Mermaid Theatre and St George's Hall, London in the 1950s. His love of theatre led to him becoming an authority on the construction of the Globe and other theatres of Shakespeare's time.

From 1935 to 1999 he both wrote and illustrated five books about theatre in that time. He had thirty years experience in theatre practice and scholarship before doing Shakespeare's Theatre for children, published by Oxford University Press in 1964. For that he won the annual Kate Greenaway Medal from the Library Association, recognising the year's best children's book illustration by a British subject. Only one other Greenaway Medal in almost sixty years has been awarded for the illustration of nonfiction. (Note: Pauline Baynes won the 1968 Greenaway Medal for illustrating a reference book, A Dictionary of Chivalry (Longman, 1968), edited by Grant Uden. Since then two illustrators have won the medal for historical fictions that the librarians call "information books": Victor Ambrus for Horses in Battle (Oxford, 1975) and Chris Riddell for Pirate Diary (Walker, 2001), written by Richard Platt. A few other winning works may be called neither fiction nor non-fiction; for example, the alphabet book ABC (Oxford, 1962) by Brian Wildsmith.) According to one library catalogue summary, Shakespeare's Theatre "[e]xamines how the pagan festivals and religious dramas performed throughout England evolved into the professional theaters, such as the Globe, in London." It also illustrates and describes "Shakespeare's famous and now rebuilt Globe Theatre".

Hodges argued in one of his books that "the theatre as an institution is the pre-eminent arrangement whereby human beings work out the models of their own conduct, their morality and aspiration, their ideas of good and evil, and in general those fantasies about themselves and their fellows which, if persisted in, tend to eventually become facts in real life. If this is so, and it would be hard to deny, then the theatre must be seen as a most powerful instrument in the social history of mankind, and its own history must therefore be allowed a corresponding importance."

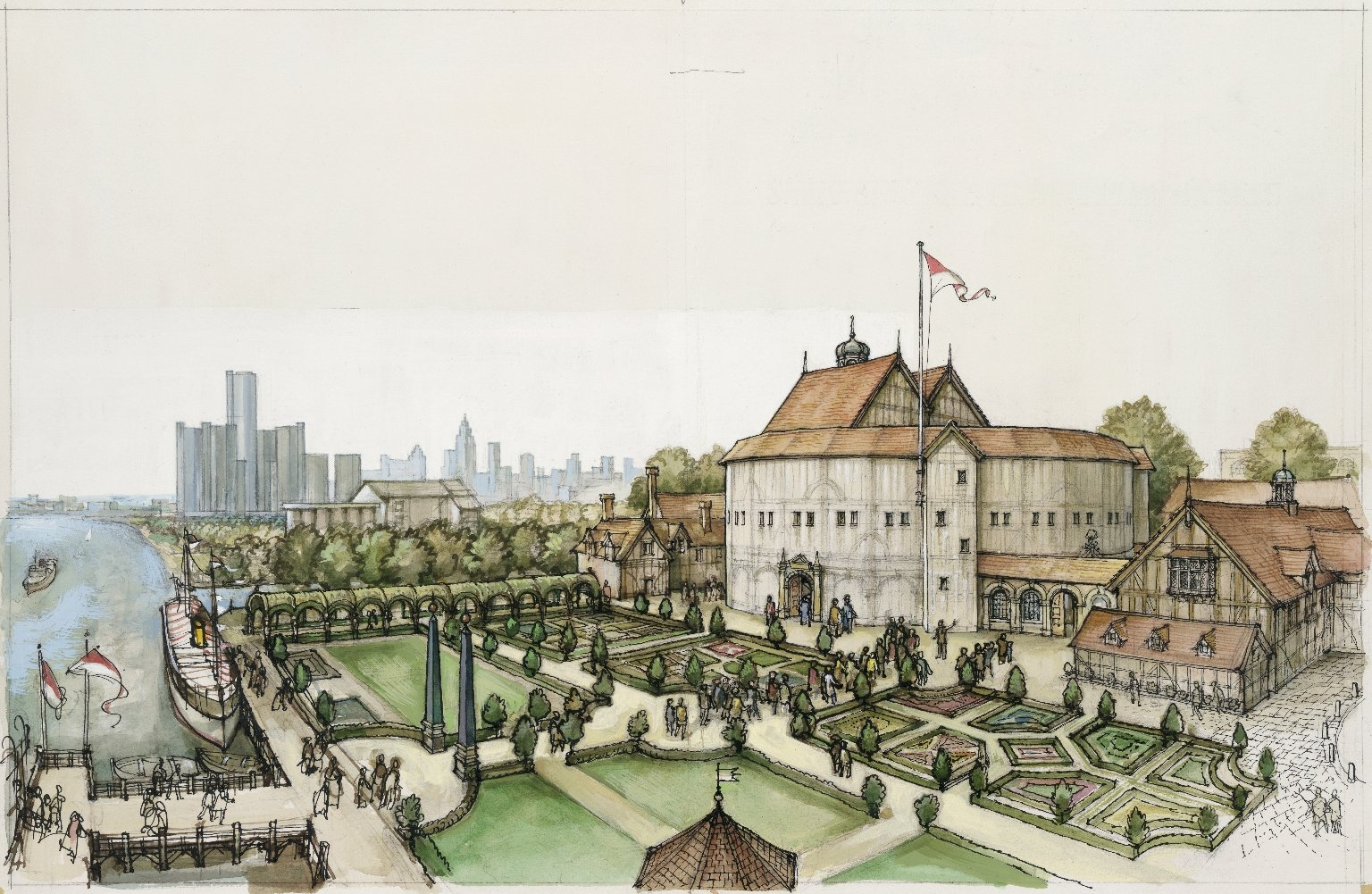
Conceptual drawing for Shakespeare's Globe in Detroit

Hodges's Shakespearean expertise led Wayne State University theatre department chair Leonard Leone to invite him to Detroit in the late 1970s and early 1980s to work on Leone's proposed reconstruction of the Globe Theatre on the Detroit River. The city suffered financially after the collapse of the U.S. auto industry and the project fell apart in 1982.

In 1986, Hodges sold his theatrical and Elizabethan drawings (almost 900 items) plus their copyright to the Folger Shakespeare Library. Because the Folger makes its digital image collection available under a Creative Commons Attribution-ShareAlike 4.0 International license, the drawings are now free cultural works.

== Selected works ==
=== Books by Walter Hodges ===
- The Globe Restored: A Study of the Elizabethan Theatre (1935)
- Columbus Sails (1939)
- Shakespeare and the Players (1948)
- Shakespeare's Theatre (1964)
- The Namesake: A Story of King Alfred (1964)
- Magna Carta (1966)
- The Norman Conquest (1966)
- The Marsh King: A Story of King Alfred (1967, sequel to The Namesake)
- The Spanish Armada (1967)
- The Overland Launch (1969, about the 1899 episode from Lynmouth Lifeboat Station)
- Shakespeare's Second Globe: The Missing Monument (1973)
- The Battlement Garden: Britain from the Wars of the Roses to the Age of Shakespeare (1979)
- Enter the Whole Army: A Pictorial Study of Shakespearean Staging, 1576–1616 (1999)

=== Books by others illustrated by Hodges ===
- Margaret J. Baker, The Shoe Shop Bears (1964), Hannibal and the Bears (1965)
- Robert Browning, The Pied Piper of Hamelin (1971)
- Elizabeth Goudge, The Little White Horse (1946), Smokey House (1939), Sister of the Angels (1939), The Dean's Watch (1960), Make-Believe (1949)
- Alfred Duggan, Growing Up in Thirteenth-Century England (1962)
- Ruth Manning-Sanders, 'Red Indian Folk and Fairy Tales (1960)
- Rosemary Sutcliff, The Chronicles of Robin Hood (1950); The Queen Elizabeth Story (1950); The Armourer's House (1951); Brother Dusty-Feet (1952); The Eagle of the Ninth (1954); The Shield Ring (1957)
- Mark Twain, Huckleberry Finn (1955)
- Mary Macgregor, Stories of King Arthur's Knights (1946?)
