= Sun Horse, Moon Horse =

1977 novel for children by Rosemary Sutcliff

- First edition
- Author: Rosemary Sutcliff
- Illustrator: Shirley Felts
- Language: English
- Genre: Historical novel
- Publisher: The Bodley Head
- Publication date: 1977
- Publication place: United Kingdom
- Media type: Print (Hardback)
- ISBN: 0-525-40495-3

Sun Horse, Moon Horse is a historical novel for children written by Rosemary Sutcliff and published in 1977.

It takes place in Iron Age Britain, telling the tale of a chieftain's son of the Iceni who is caught up in a conflict with the neighboring Attribates, and plays an instrumental part in creating a monumental Hill figure while working to save his tribe.

== Plot summary ==
The story revolves around Lubrin Dhu, a younger son of the chieftain, who takes after the Little Dark People who predated the Celtic settlers of the Iceni tribe; and whose name "Dhu" is related to Gaelic "Dubh", reflecting his darker appearance. Much is made of cultural differences between the reigning Celts, who are associated with fair hair and skin, and the original Chthonic Little Dark People, who are associated with darker complexions and a closeness with the earth. This cultural contrast again comes to fore when the Iceni, being associated with the moon, are subjugated by the Attribates, who are associated with the Sun.

Lubrin Dhu's upbringing allows the reader to witness the culture of his people, from a somewhat "outside" point of view, as he is considered different from his people, on account of his darker color, reserved personality, and attraction to art. His people are matrilineal, with leadership going to the husband of Lubrin's sister. His father's status as chieftain derives from being married to the "woman of the tribe", and is intertwined with his duty to lay down his life for the tribe if needed, a duty which later descends to Lubrin Dhu.

After their tribe is vanquished by the Attribates and their Strong Place occupied, Lubrin Dhu finds himself nominal leader of the survivors, his father and older brothers having been killed in battle. He strikes a bargain with the conquering chieftain, who will free Lubrin's people after completion of a monumental horse carved from the hillside. This figure becomes the Uffington White Horse. The novel's title reflects how the horse connects both the Solar attributes of the Attribates and the Lunar attributes of the Iceni, being considered an invocation to Epona. Lubrin Dhu ultimately voluntarily sacrifices himself for the consecration of the horse, fulfilling his duty as a chieftain's son, and offering a depiction of possible Celtic blood sacrifice.

== Themes ==
The theme of the novel revolves around conflicting cultures, and the duties assumed and performed by individuals within those cultures. The duties of a king are shown in many of her novels, including Sword at Sunset and The Mark of the Horse Lord, and have been credited as being influenced by James Frazer's The Golden Bough.

== Reception ==
Kirkus Reviews gave a favourable review for the work and wrote "Though Sutcliff has given us more rounded recreations in the past, and here as elsewhere her plot sometimes seems too well made, her vision of an artist simultaneously--in fact, indissolubly--true to his art and to his people is impressively realized."
