= Dunadd =

Hill fort in Argyll and Bute, Scotland

Dunadd Hillfort
- Kilmichael Glassary, Argyll, Scotland, United Kingdom
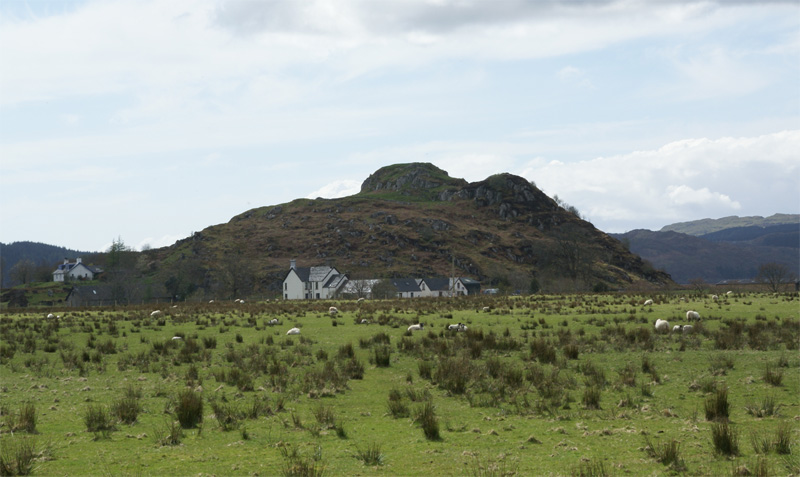
- Dunadd Hillfort Crag

Site information
- Type: Hillfort
- Open to the public: Yes
- Condition: Ruin

Location
- Coordinates: 56°05′10″N 5°28′43″W

Site history
- In use: Iron age–16th century C.E.
- Materials: Stone

Dunadd (Scottish Gaelic Dún Ad, "fort on the [River] Add", Old Irish Dún Att) is a hillfort in Argyll and Bute, Scotland, dating from the Iron Age and early medieval period and is believed to be the capital of the ancient kingdom of Dál Riata. Dal Riata was a Gaelic kingdom spanning the northern Irish coast to Argyll and the Scottish islands in the early centuries AD, possibly after the Romans had abandoned Southern Britain and at the time when the Anglo-Saxons were crossing the North Sea to counter incursions over Hadrian's Wall by the Picts and Dalriadan Scots.

== Description ==
Dunadd is a rocky crag that may have been one time an island and now lies inland near the River Add, from which it takes its name, a little north of Lochgilphead (NR 836 936). The surrounding land, now largely reclaimed, was formerly boggy and known as the Mòine Mhòr ("Great Moor") in Gaelic. This no doubt increased the defensive potential of the site. Detailed analysis of sea-level changes in the region argue that the Dun was an island or promontory into historic times, and that receding sea levels left the fortification open to siege and seizure in the 6th to 7th centuries.

== History ==
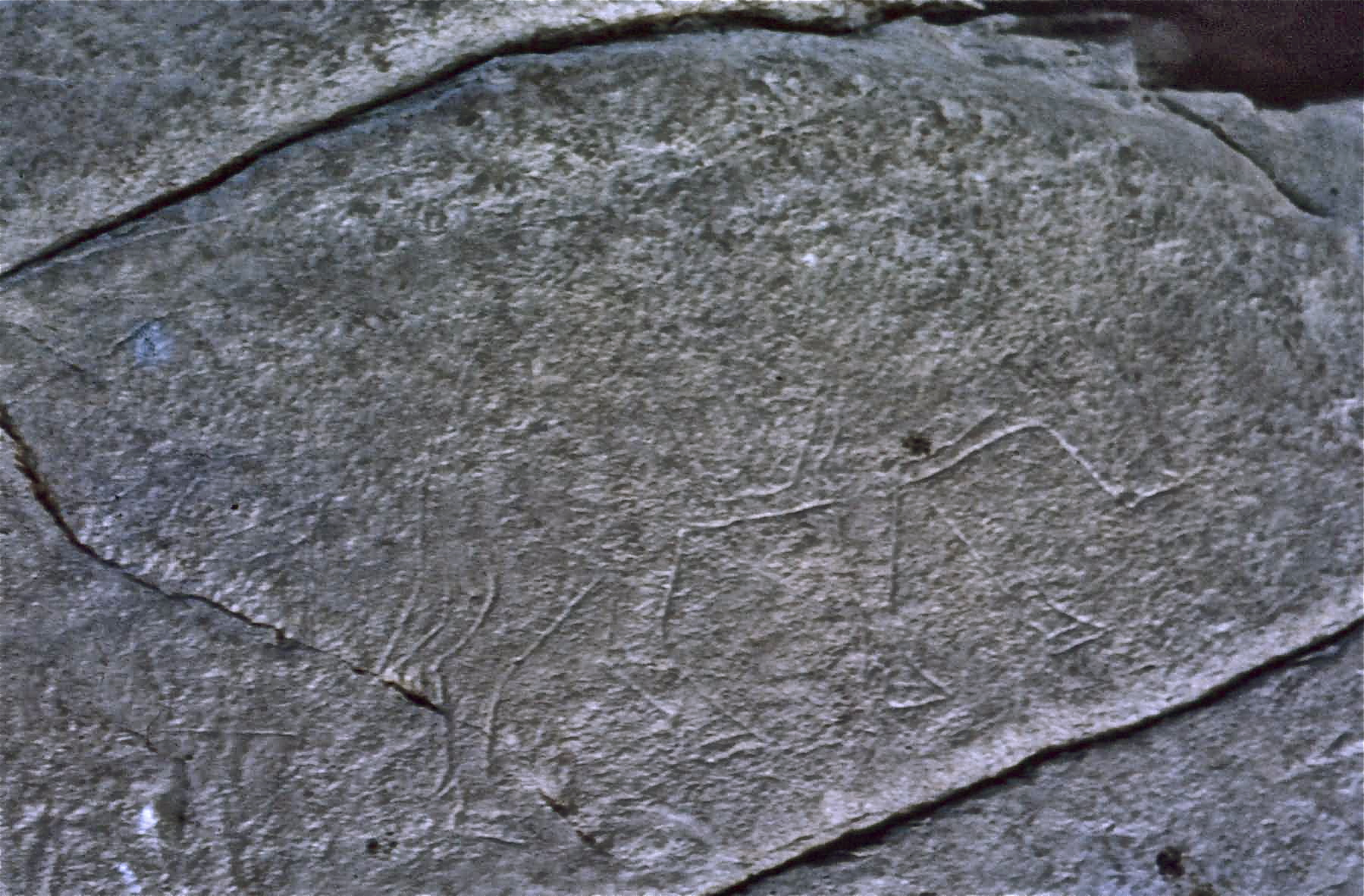
Pictish boar carving in rock near the top of the hill.

Originally occupied in the Iron Age, the site later became a seat of the kings of Dál Riata. It is known for its unique stone carvings below the upper enclosure, including a footprint and basin thought to have formed part of Dál Riata's coronation ritual. On the same flat outcrop of rock is an incised boar in Pictish style, and an inscription in the ogham script. The inscription is read as referring to a Finn Manach and is dated to the late 8th century or after.

Dunadd is mentioned twice in early sources. In 683 the Annals of Ulster record: "The siege of Dún At and the siege of Dún Duirn" without further comment on the outcome or participants. In the same chronicle the entry for 736 states: "Aengus son of Fergus, king of the Picts, laid waste the territory of Dál Riata and seized Dún At and burned Creic and bound in chains two sons of Selbach, i.e., Donngal and Feradach."

The site was occupied after 736, at least into the 9th century. It is mentioned twice in later sources, suggesting that it retained some importance. In 1436, it is recorded that "Alan son of John Riabhach MacLachlan of Dunadd" was made seneschal of the lands of Glassary; the chief place of residence of the MacLachlans of Dunadd lay below the fort. In June 1506, commissioners appointed by James IV, including the earl and bishop of Argyll, met at Dunadd to collect rents and resolve feuds.

The site is an ancient monument, under the care of Historic Scotland, and is open to the public (open all year; no entrance charge).

== Excavations ==
Because Dunadd is mentioned in early sources, and is readily identifiable, it has been excavated on several occasions (1904–1905, 1929, and 1980) and has one of the most important ensembles of finds from any early medieval site in Scotland. Finds range from the 6th to the 8th centuries AD. These include tools, weapons, quernstones, imported pottery and motif-pieces and moulds for the manufacture of fine metalwork (especially jewellery).

== Bruach An Druimein connection ==
Seven kilometres to the north of Dunadd is the site of Bruach An Druimein. Excavated in the 1960s in advance of gravel quarrying, archaeologists discovered the remains of a Bronze Age cists cemetery, two round houses from the Iron Age, and a number of artefacts from the early medieval period that were contemporary with Dunadd. Two medieval glass beads were found that have similar chemical compositions to those found at Dunadd, leading the archaeologists to believe that the beads came from Dunadd and that the site was associated with, or controlled by Dunadd.

== In fiction ==
In Rosemary Sutcliff's 1965 novel The Mark of the Horse Lord the Dal Riada undergo an internal struggle for control of royal succession, with Dun Monaidh central to the conflict, including a depiction of royal coronation and use of carved footprint. Dunadd is the location for Claire R. McDougall's novel "Veil of Time," in which a modern-day woman is transported back to Dunadd's heyday in the 8th century. All the features of Dunadd, including the footprint, the boar, the well and the tumble down ruins are features of the story, as are the modern farm and cottages . Other ancient sites in the Kilmartin Valley also play a part in the narrative.

== Files ==
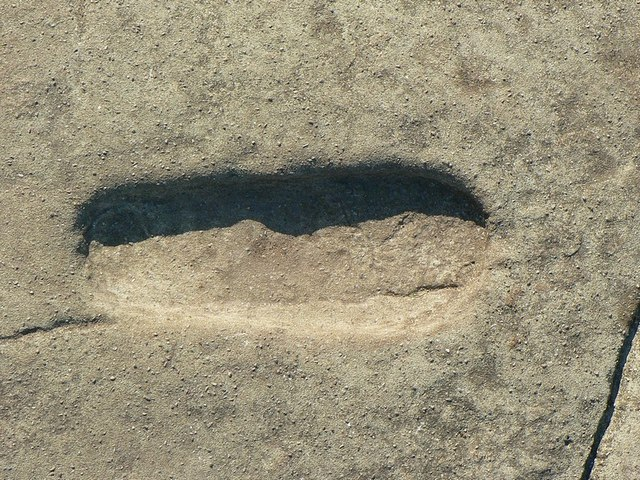
Footprint of Fealty

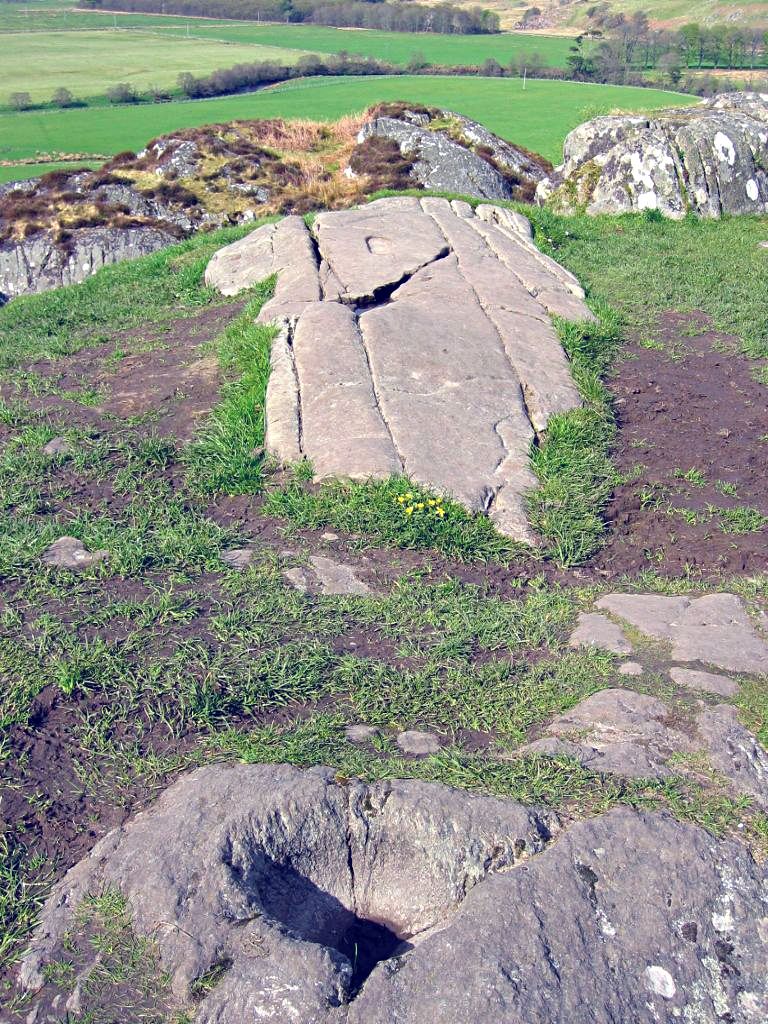
Dunadd Fort Basin and Footprint, in Kilmichael Glassary in Argyll and Bute, Scotland

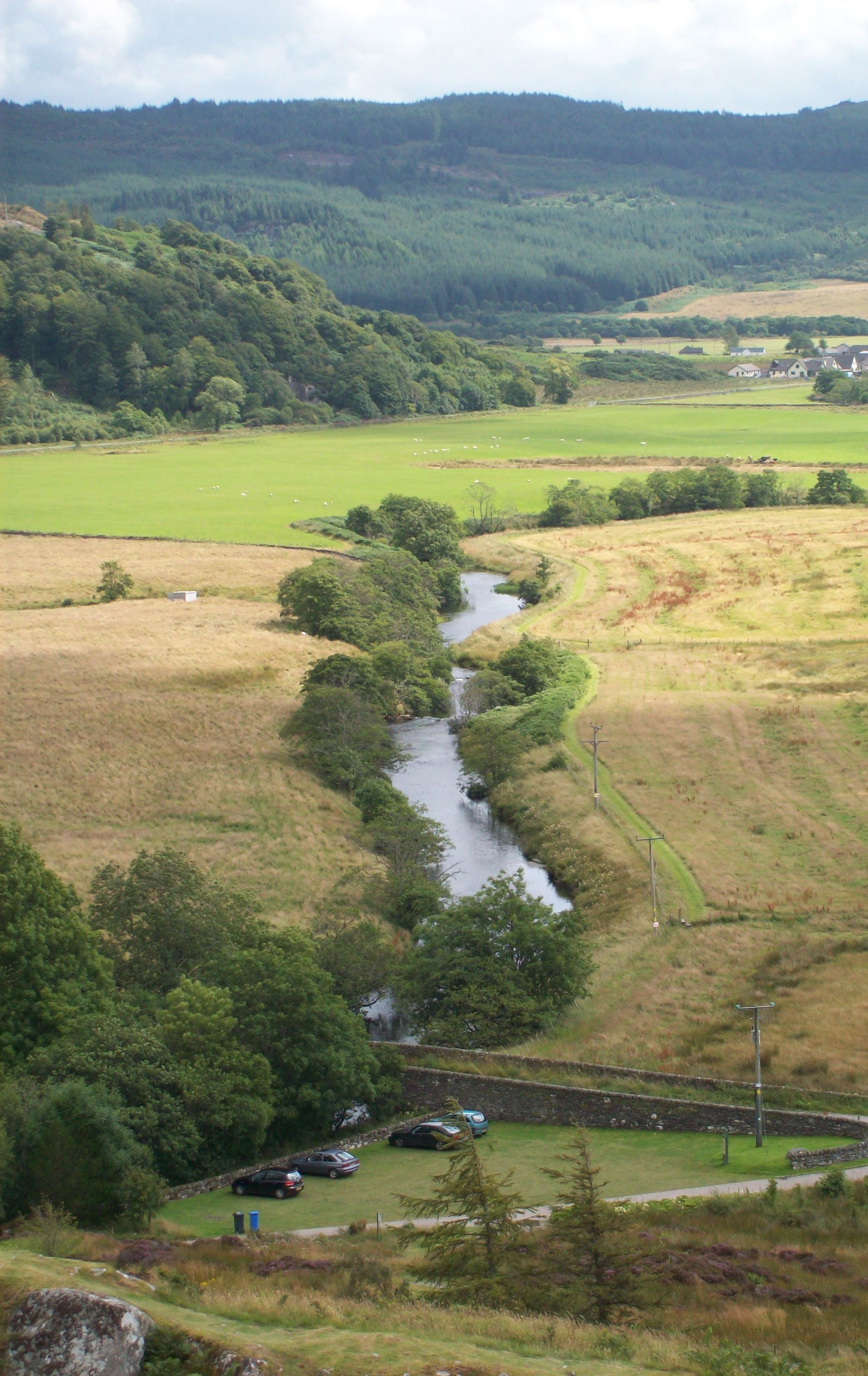
A View Of The River From The Summit Of Dunadd

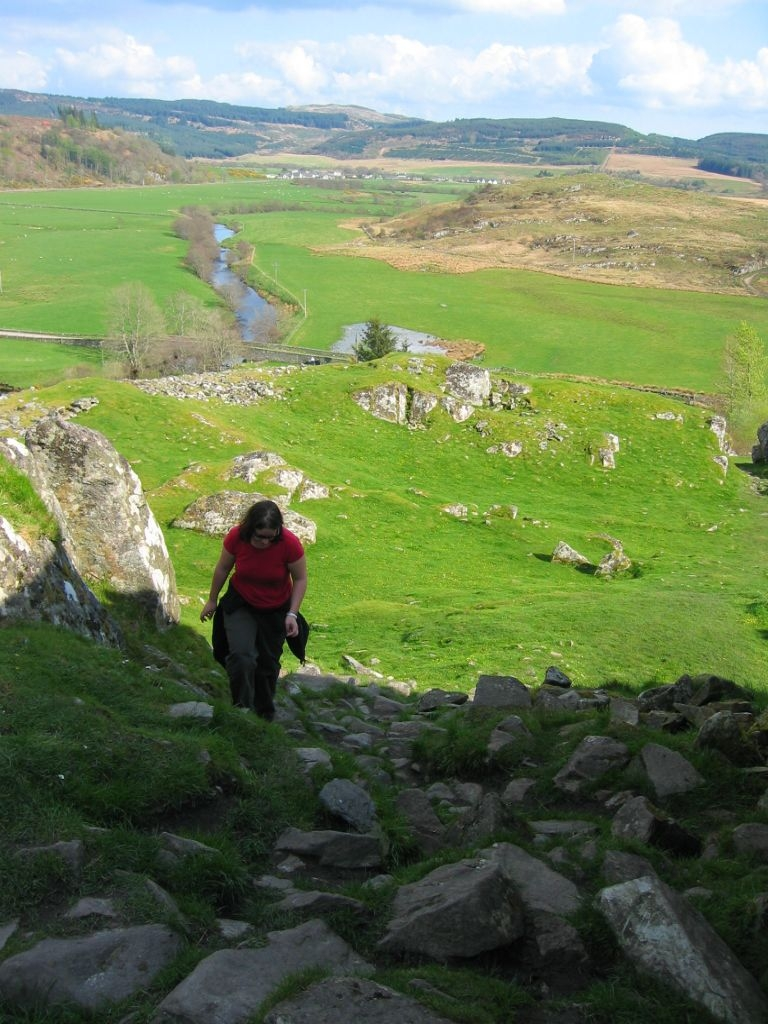
Extended view reverse of climb to top of Dunadd Fort

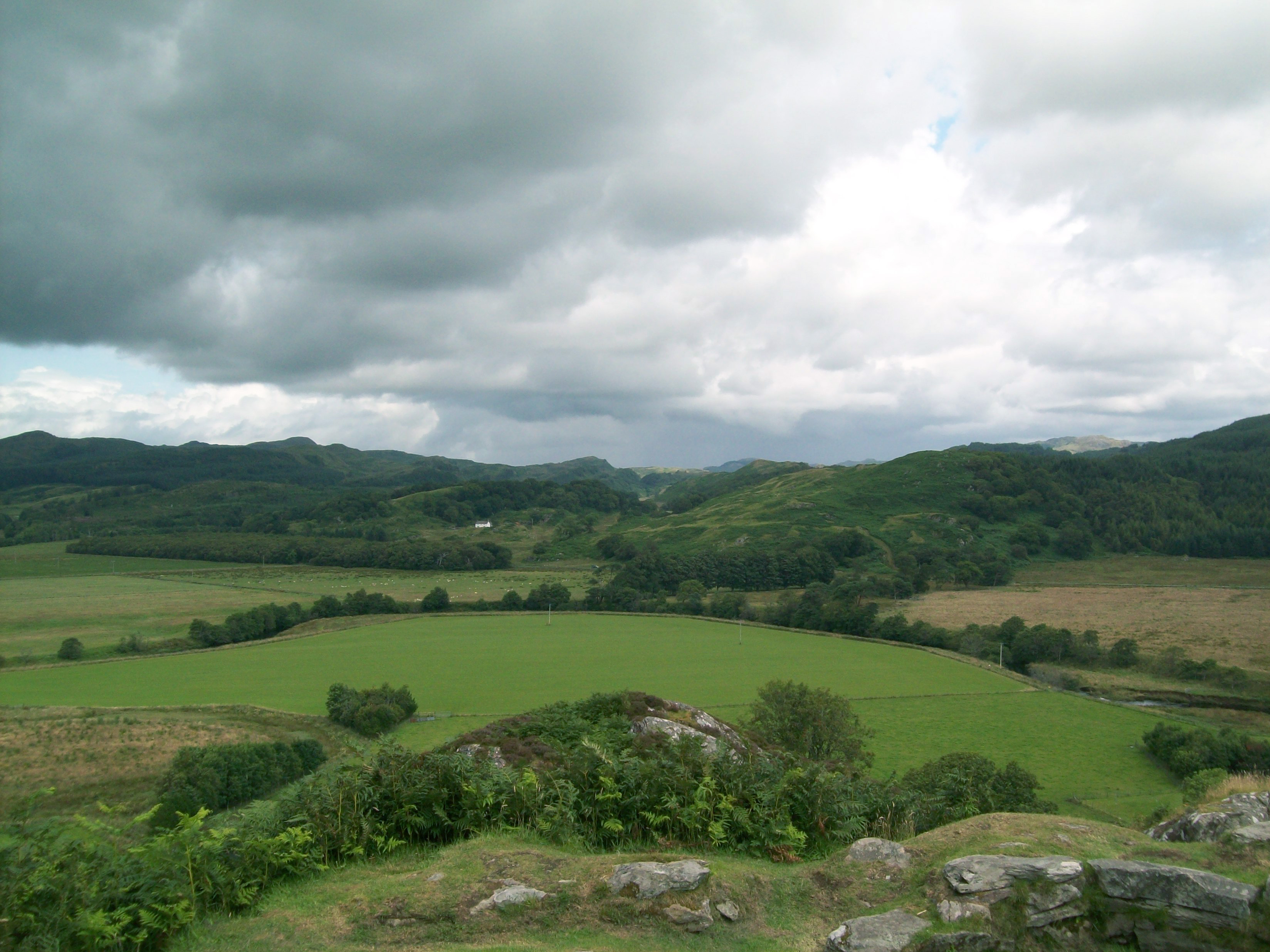
A View From Atop Dunadd

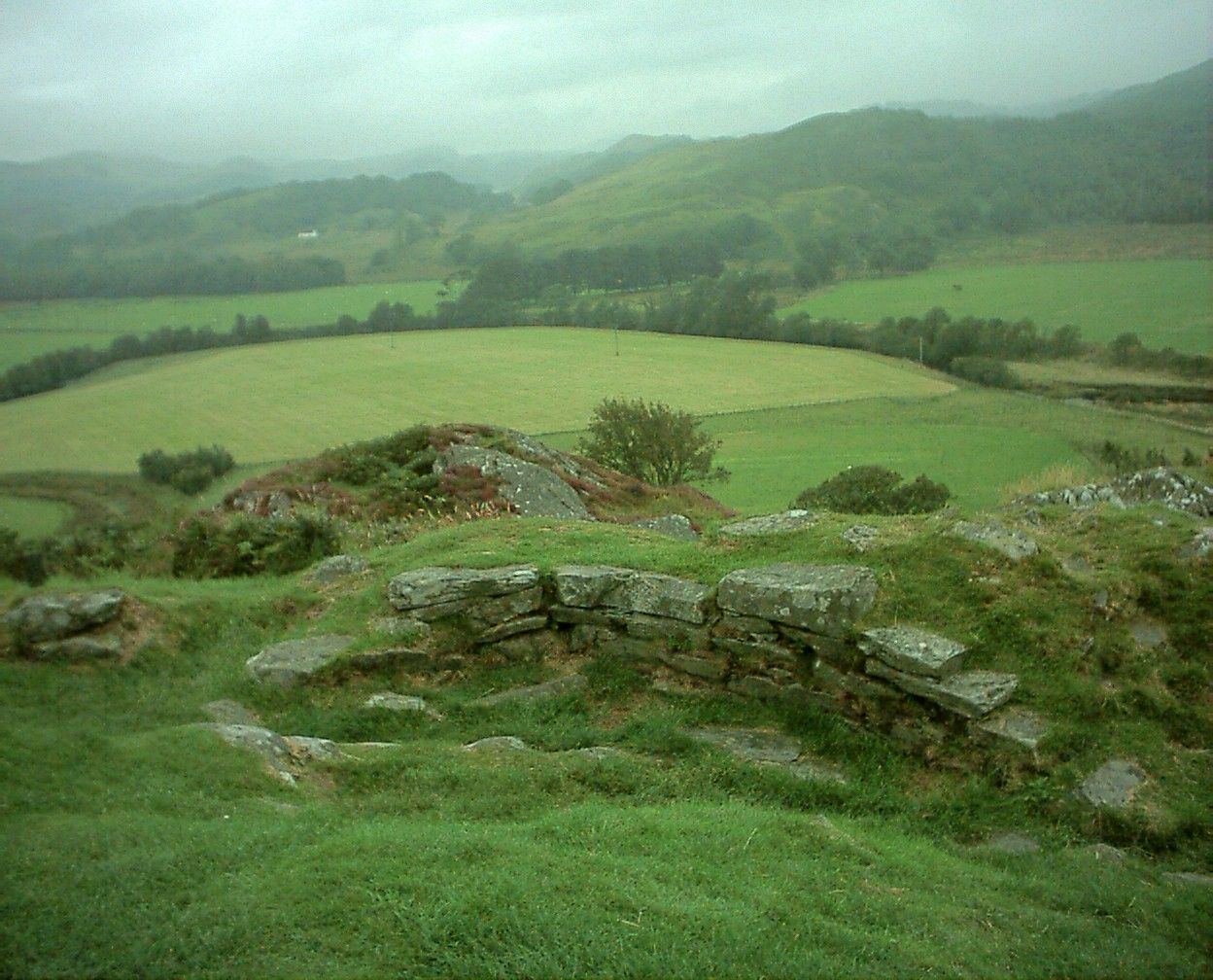
Dunadd Hillfort - A View From The Summit

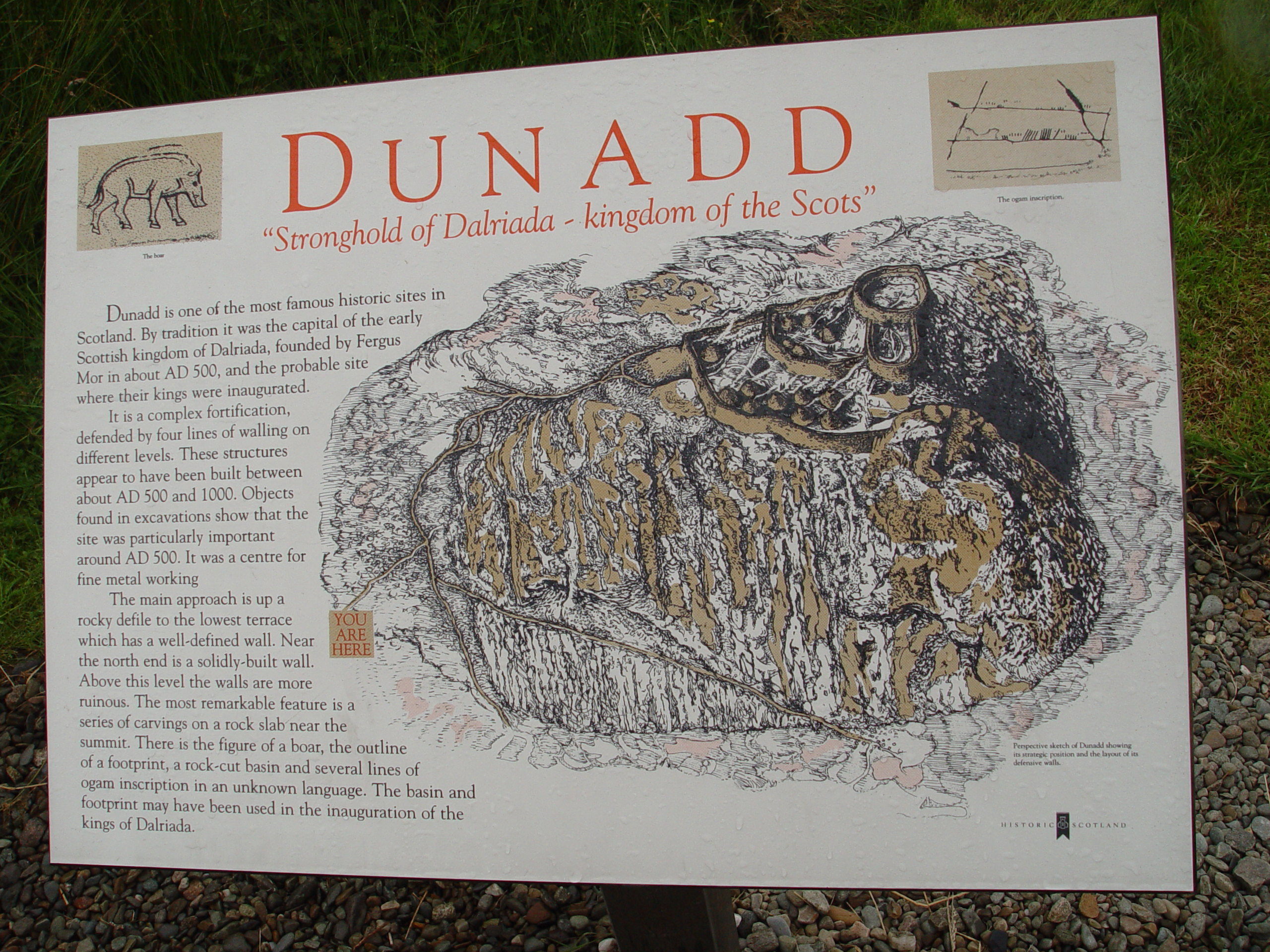
On site Descriptive Sign and Map

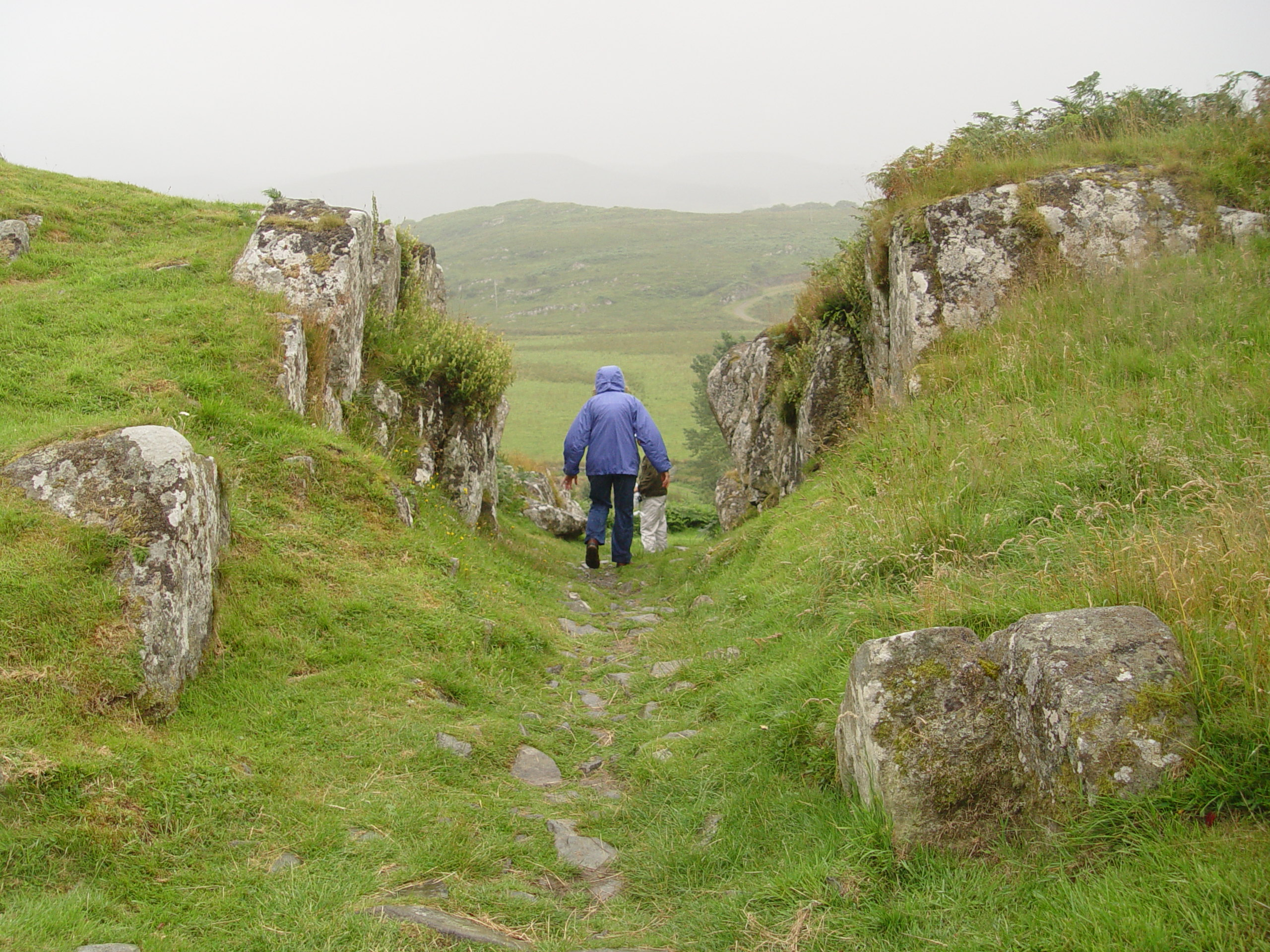
Pathway carved through rocks near summit

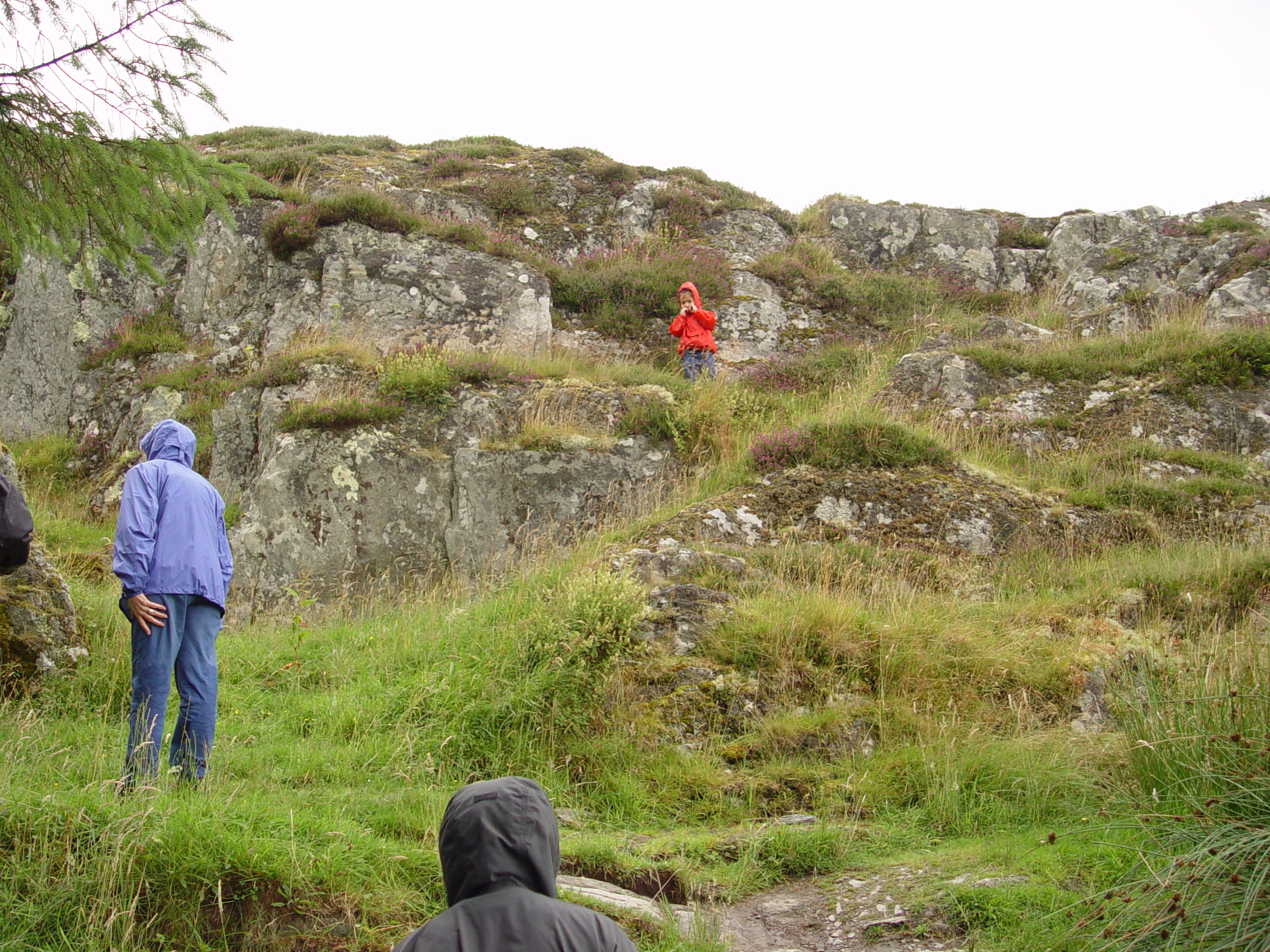
Mid-level approach up steep slope

== See also ==
- Petrosomatoglyph
