= Sword Song =

Sword Song may refer to:

- Sword Song (Cornwell novel), a novel by Bernard Cornwell, published in 2007
- Sword Song (Sutcliff novel), a children's novel by Rosemary Sutcliff, published posthumously in 1997
- Schwertlied, a German poem by Theodor Körner, shortly before his death in 1813
