= Dawn Wind =

Historical novel by Rosemary Sutcliff

- First edition
- Author: Rosemary Sutcliff
- Illustrator: Charles Keeping
- Cover artist: Charles Keeping
- Language: English
- Genre: Historical novel
- Publisher: Oxford University Press
- Publication date: 1961
- Publication place: United Kingdom
- Media type: Print (Hardback)
- Preceded by: Sword at Sunset
- Followed by: Sword Song

Dawn Wind is a historical novel for children and young adults written by Rosemary Sutcliff and published in 1961 by Oxford University Press, with illustrations by Charles Keeping.

It takes place in Britain in the sixth century, after the Saxons, Angles and Jutes have gained dominion over most of Britain. Owain, a descendant of Roman and British soldiers, is the only survivor of the Battle of Deorham, near Bath.

== Plot ==
The story follows him, and the dog he finds after the battle, into the border country with Wales to the ruins of Viroconium (Wroxeter). There he meets a street urchin named Regina, the only person left in the city. They learn to trust each other and form a bond. When they leave the city and are later separated, Owain becomes a thrall to a Saxon lord on "Seals' Island" (Manhood Peninsula), where he spends a number of years. In the end, Owain and Regina are finally reunited and return to the Celtic lands beyond the Welsh border.

The story takes place at a turning point in the evolution of relations among the Saxons, invaders from the European mainland, and the indigenous Celts. As Owain lives and fights with the Saxons, he sees them beginning to reach accommodation and common cause with the Celts.

The Dawn Wind of the title is a reference to the arrival of St Augustine, who brought Christianity to the Saxons. This change also later brought the Saxons and the already-Christian Celts closer together.

== Reception ==
Kirkus Reviews wrote "True to form, Rosemary Sutcliff has dramatized another aspect of British history with the same skill and accuracy that characterized her earlier books." and "An era few history courses tackle is enlivened and portrayed for the admirer of historical adventure."

== Adaptation ==
A dramatisation of the novel by Felix Felton was broadcast by the BBC as a six-part late afternoon radio serial in 1962. It was directed by David Davis, with Simon Lack as the adult Owain, whom Felton made to narrate his own story. The young Owain, in the first two episodes, was Glyn Dearman, while Kika Markham played Regina and Felton himself Einon Hen.
