= Maria McCann =

English novelist

- Born: 1956 (age 69–70); Liverpool, England
- Occupations: Novelist, teacher
- Writing career
- Genre: Historical

Maria McCann is an English novelist.

== Biography ==
McCann was born in Liverpool in 1956 and worked as a lecturer in English at Strode College, Street, Somerset since 1985, until starting work with the Arvon Foundation.

Her first novel, As Meat Loves Salt, was released in 2001. The story focuses on the relationship of two men, Jacob Cullen and Christopher Ferris, and is set during the English Civil War. They desert their posts in Cromwell’s New Model Army to establish a farming commune in the countryside. The novel was well received by critics including Orange Prize winner Lionel Shriver.

McCann also contributed a short story titled Minimal to the anthology New Writing 12 published by the British Council in 2005.

Her second novel, The Wilding, was published in February 2010. Set in England in the 1670s, it is the story of a young cider-presser, Jonathan Dymond, his dark family secrets, and the young beggar woman he tries to help. It was long-listed for the Orange Prize.

Ace, King, Knave, her third novel, was published in 2013. It is set in London of the 1760s. It tells an interwoven tale of a recently married gentlewoman of some means, Sophia, her controlling but often absent and mysterious husband Mr Zedland, Titus the black slave he gives her as a wedding present, and Betsy-Ann an ex-prostitute. The dialogue makes extensive use of Thieves' Cant and a glossary is provided.

== Bibliography ==
- As Meat Loves Salt, Flamingo, 2001 ISBN 978-0002261944
- Minimal, in New Writing 12, British Council, 2005
- The Wilding, Faber and Faber, 2010 ISBN 978-1444803907
- Ace, King, Knave, Faber and Faber, 2013 ISBN 978-0571297580
