= Lady in Waiting (novel) =

Book by Rosemary Sutcliff

- First edition (UK)
- Author: Rosemary Sutcliff
- Language: English
- Genre: Historical novel
- Publisher: Hodder & Stoughton (UK); Coward-McCann (US)
- Publication date: 1957
- Media type: Print (Hardcover)

Lady in Waiting is a historical novel by Rosemary Sutcliff and first published in 1957.

It is set in the Elizabethan era and beginning of the Stuart period of England, telling the life story of Sir Walter Raleigh, primarily through the viewpoint of his wife, Bess Throckmorton. This is the first of Sutcliff's five novels written and listed as expressly for 'adult' readership, and like her later 1967 adult novel The Flowers of Adonis, uses the technique of having the central character's narrative told by his relation to other characters.

== Plot summary ==
The story is primarily about the life and exploits of Sir Walter Raleigh, albeit with the bulk of the narration revolving around the impact of his life on Elizabeth Throckmorton, who is referred to as 'Bess.' It begins with Raleigh's (this is the spelling used in the novel) childhood in Budleigh, and quickly shows his close relationship with half-brother Humphrey Gilbert. Glibert is attributed as sharing and inspiring Raleigh's lifelong passion of wanting to explore the New World, beginning with a plan to seek the fabled Northwest Passage. Much of the rest of Raleigh's life is explained as being primarily motivated by this passion.

Bess is brought into the novel when Raleigh is seeking favor at Queen Elizabeth I's court at the Palace of Westminster. She is 12 years of age, and Raleigh makes a strong impression on her during a chance meeting in a garden. He is whistling the tune of Greensleeves, which is used throughout the novel, and shares his frustration of being stymied in his goals of exploration. Bess grows up at court in proximity to Mary Sidney, eventually becoming a Lady-in-Waiting to the Queen. She is immersed in court culture, early on being connected with Philip Sidney, Robert Devereux, and Robin Cecil. They are all shown as children growing up in the shadows of their elders, Lord Essex and Lord Burghley, respectively; and the court intrigues of the times. The two 'Robins' are connected with Raleigh in what is described as a Triumvirate, around which both her life and the fate of England are shown as revolving.

The first half of the novel takes place during the reign of Queen Elizabeth, charting the ups and downs of Raleigh's career from the 1590s onward; including his position as Captain of the Queen's Guard, his fall from favor after a clandestine marriage to Bess, their life at Durham House and Sherborne, his return to favor and involvement with the capture of Cádiz, the rise of Robin Cecil to become Secretary of State, the fall and execution of Robin Devereux, Raleigh's exploration of what is now Guyana, and attempt to promote the legend of El Dorado as motivation to gain further favor for future explorations.

The second half of the novel takes place during the reign of King James, showing his decline under the machinations of Robin Cecil, 13 year imprisonment in the Tower of London after being impugned of involvement in the Main Plot by way of Lord Cobham, eventual restoration and resumption of exploration of the Orinoco, the death of his son Walter while on the exploration, Raleigh's downfall after the failure of the exploration, and eventual execution.

Bess's life is shown as revolving around 'waiting' for Raleigh to 'remember her,' and being faithful to support him despite his overarching drive for exploration. Her anxieties are explored in depth, and their relationship is portrayed as being very strong, even in the face of extremity. Raleigh's life is shown as a complex tapestry of events that only make sense in the light of his lifelong dream of exploration. His execution is shown as the passing of the 'last of Elizabeth's Round Table,' with a sense of nostalgia for the adventurers in service to Queen Elizabeth and the Golden Age which she created.
