= Outcast (Sutcliff novel) =

Novel by Rosemary Sutcliff

- First edition
- Author: Rosemary Sutcliff
- Cover artist: Richard Kennedy
- Language: English
- Genre: Historical novel
- Publisher: OUP
- Publication date: 1955
- Publication place: United Kingdom
- Media type: Print (Hardback)

Outcast is a historical novel for children written by Rosemary Sutcliff and published in 1955.

It takes place in Roman Britain and tells the tale of an orphaned Roman child who is shipwrecked on a coast of Dumnonia in Celtic Britain, outside of Roman rule. He is adopted by a childless couple, grows up within the tribe, eventually leaving to rejoin Roman society, and being carried along by a chain of events all the way to Rome and ultimately back to Britain. Like many Sutcliff novels, the plot is driven by the protagonist's search for identity amidst several cultures in which he feels himself to be an outcast.

== Plot summary ==
The story is about a boy named Beric, who is raised amongst the Dumnonii. After coming of age, his status within their culture comes under pressure, shown in a conflict between the acceptance of the village bard and the condemnation on religious grounds by the town druid. After a bad harvest is linked to his presence, the superstitious views of the Druid win out and Beric is exiled from the tribe.

He journeys to Isca Dumnoniorum, where he falls afoul of a Greek slave trader, who tricks Beric and takes him as a slave. He is ultimately purchased by Publius Pio, a Roman magistrate, and becomes part of Pio's patrician household on the Viminal Hill. Beric antagonizes Glaucus, son of Publius Pio, embarrassing Glaucus at a dinner celebrating Pio's election to the office of aedile. Centurion Justinius witnesses this scene, resulting in Beric being condemned to work in the salt mines, a certain slow and painful death.

Beric makes his escape from Pio's household, hiding in a disused temple of Sylvan Pan, and making his way north on the Via Flaminia, hoping to walk back to Britain. He is caught in the Roman countryside, condemned as a bandit, and sentenced to live out his life as a galley slave. He works in the Rhenus Fleet stationed in Colonia Claudia Ara Agrippinensium, living many years on the galley Alcestis. His galley is eventually sent to Britain, surviving a great storm, during which Beric is thrown overboard for dead. Beric washes ashore for the second time in his life, this time to be rescued by the Roman British household of the centurion Justinius, who had returned to his duty station after his leave in Rome.

Beric now joins in the work on the Rhee Wall of Romney Marsh, where the Romans, led by Justinius, are working to reclaim land from the sea. The progress of the Rhee Wall and the lives of the workers are threatened by a great storm, during which Beric bonds with his new comrades, and after which he concludes that he has finally found a place and a people where he belongs.

Like in many Sutcliff novels, the theme of Outcast revolves around Beric's struggle to find belonging as he is caught in various degrees of acceptance and discrimination by the various societies through which he travels. Another theme common to other Sutcliff novels is the Celtic native hound strongly featured in Outcast; Beric's progress is paralleled by renouncing his native dog in the beginning of the novel, later adopting a mixed-breed dog near the Roman camp by the Rhee Wall, and ultimately having his breakthrough moment of feeling accepted when the second dog drops her newborn pup on his feet.

Richard Kennedy's cover art is in colour, while the illustrations within the novel are black-and-white charcoal drawings.
