= The Armourer's House =

Book by Rosemary Sutcliff

- First edition cover
- Author: Rosemary Sutcliff
- Illustrator: C. Walter Hodges
- Language: English
- Genre: Historical novel
- Publisher: OUP
- Publication date: 1951
- Publication place: United Kingdom
- Media type: Print (Hardcover)
- Pages: 235 pp
- ISBN: 0-19-277027-6

The Armourer's House is a children's historical novel by Rosemary Sutcliff and first published in 1951.

It is set primarily in London during the reign of King Henry VIII. It is Sutcliff's third book, and is acknowledged by her as being 'a little too cozy and a little too sweet,' being part of what she refers to as her 'apprenticeship phase of writing.' and will likely read as more of an outright children's novel than most of her later works. Though unrelated to the Eagle of the Ninth series connected by the Dolphin Signet ring, this novel features Sutcliff's first use of Dolphin imagery in her storytelling.

== Plot summary ==
The story revolves around a 10-year-old girl named Tamsyn, who has been orphaned and is being raised by her uncle, a shipowner in Bideford. She is brought to live in London by another uncle, who works as a swordsmith, or armourer, being the owner of the house after which the novel is titled.

Tamsyn is a dark-complected girl, contrasting with the entirely red headed family which has taken her in; showing Sutcliff's reoccurring themes of outsiders, belonging, red heads, and light vs. dark. She is homesick for her West Country life, but slowly adapts to London city life and being part of a larger family. Through the novel she witnesses Morris dancers on May Day; visits the market in Cheapside, the Billingsgate Fish Market, and the Royal Dockyard in Deptford. She watches King Henry VIII and his current queen Anne Boleyn proceed up the Thames in his royal barge, transiting from his palace in Greenwich to his palace in Westminster. The mother of the house tells them the tale of Tam Lin on Halloween, which parallels the theme of a girl who struggles to pursue her dreams.

She watches tall ships at the docks, consistently showing a strong interest in sailing, which she shares with one of the Armourer's sons, Piers. Both Piers and Tamsyn dream of sailing away and exploring the word, adventuring with the backdrop of the Age of Exploration. Piers is restrained by being bound as an apprentice to his father, while Tamsyn is restrained by being a girl.

The oldest son, who had been thought drowned, returns to the family on Christmas Eve while they are home singing Christmas Carols. This frees Piers from his obligation, so he is welcomed to sail with the ship-owning uncle in the coming spring. Tamsyn is overjoyed, as he has promised to bring her along when he is older and becomes master of a ship.

== Language ==
The language employed by Sutcliff in the novel as described by Gillian Lathey "resembles nothing so much as that of a 1950s; middle-class British family. Archaisms ... add a patina of historical romance to the reinforcement of familiar values."

== Reception ==
Kirkus Reviews saw The Armourer's House as "A gay portrait of London in the days of Henry VII... " and "one exuberant adventure after another" with "The pictures by C. Walter Hodges ... endowed with a warmth that complements the stories."
