= Brother Dusty-Feet =

Book by Rosemary Sutcliff

- First edition
- Author: Rosemary Sutcliff
- Illustrator: C. Walter Hodges
- Cover artist: William Stobbs
- Language: English
- Genre: Historical novel
- Publisher: OUP
- Publication date: 1952
- Publication place: United Kingdom
- Media type: Print (Hardcover)
- Pages: 248 pp
- ISBN: 0-19-271444-9

Brother Dusty-Feet is a children's historical novel written by Rosemary Sutcliff and first published in 1952.

It is set in England during the reign of Queen Elizabeth I. It is Sutcliff's fourth book.

== Plot summary ==
Hugh Copplestone is an orphaned eleven-year-old boy living with his Aunt Alison (his dead mother's sister-in-law), who resents the duty of looking after him. When he answers her back after she speaks disrespectfully of his dead father, Aunt Alison vindictively vows to have his pet dog Argos killed on the excuse that she has no duty of care to the animal and no intention of incurring the expense any longer.

There is an overnight stay of execution since all the farmhands who could have undertaken the task are away at a fair, which gives Hugh time to plan an escape. He resolves to run away and hopes to make his way to Oxford and become a scholar, as his father always wanted him to do. However, he is not long on his way when he falls in with a troupe of strolling players, whose leader Tobias Pennifeather soon wheedles the story out of him. Tobias offers to allow Hugh to travel with them so that he will have their protection on the road and the means of earning a living, and he is first assisting with the troupe's properties and then participating in the plays themselves, since female parts were generally played by boys and their boy Nicky Bodkyn is starting to grow up.

Hugh is especially befriended by Jonathan Whyteleafe, the troupe's playwright and tumbler, who is visibly more intelligent than the rest although too poor to have afforded much education. Jonathan is aware that his plays are only rhyming jingle, which he can compose easily, and once appears to bemoan his inability to write grander literature; while Jonathan appears briefly saddened by the admission, he is easily comforted by the thought that he is the best tumbler in the South-country.

The troupe has many adventures as they meander across Elizabethan England. Once they are arrested as vagabonds for trying to perform without a licence, then released from the stocks on the word of Sir Walter Raleigh who pretends to the local constable that they are secret agents working for Sir Francis Walsingham. At one point they have the ill luck to blunder into Hugh's aunt and uncle, and escape by having Hugh switch clothes with Nicky while another company member, Jasper Nye, pretends to be ill with the sweating-sickness. At a fair, Hugh is able to warn a friendly Quack doctor of the arrival of the law, and is later ceremoniously granted "Seisin of the Road" by a Tom O'Bedlam around the fair-folks' camp fire.

Eventually Hugh has the good luck to meet Mr. Anthony Heritage, an old acquaintance of his father's, a gentleman with a son of a similar age to Hugh and a daughter a little younger and who is willing to foster him and sponsor him as an Oxford scholar, servitor to his own son as Hugh's father was to him. At first Hugh is reluctant to leave the Players, but Jonathan has a quiet talk with him to convince him of the uncertainty of a strolling player's mildly illegal life and the advantages of a good education. Jonathan's strong affection for his adopted brother is very evident when Hugh accuses him of wanting to "get rid of me", but Hugh sees sense and, as the story closes, is happily settling in with his new family.

== Radio 4 adaptation ==
A three-episode dramatisation of Brother Dusty-Feet was broadcast on BBC Radio 4 in February and March 2012. The cast included:

- Josef Lindsay as Hugh
- Jane Whittenshaw as Aunt Alison
- Allan Corduner as Tobias Pennyfeather
- Narrated by Adjoa Andoh
