= Sword Song (Sutcliff novel) =

Book by Rosemary Sutcliff

Sword Song is a children's novel written by Rosemary Sutcliff and published posthumously in 1997, having been found in handwritten manuscript form on her desk when she died.

The novel is set in Viking times and follows the story of its principal character, Bjarni, who was cast out of his home for breaking an oath and spent five years sailing the west coast of Scotland, witnessing the feuds of the clan chiefs living there.

== Reception ==
Publishers Weekly wrote: "For all the rough edges in Sutcliff's posthumously published novel, it nonetheless brings far-off times, peoples and places vividly to life." Kirkus Reviews called the book "A glorious tale, full of pulse and power."
