= The Queen Elizabeth Story =

1952 children's novel by Rosemary Sutcliff

- First edition
- Author: Rosemary Sutcliff
- Cover artist: C. Walter Hodges
- Language: English
- Genre: Historical fiction
- Publisher: Oxford University Press
- Publication date: 1952
- Media type: Print
- Pages: 208

The Queen Elizabeth Story is a 1952 children's historical novel by Rosemary Sutcliff, originally published by Oxford University Press.

== Plot summary ==
Nine-year-old Perdita Pettle lives in Broomhill, a quiet village in the county of Devon, in Devonshire, where her father is the rector. Because she was born close to midnight on Midsummer, she has always been able to see fairies, or Pharisees, in the shady lanes and flowering gardens near her home. On her previous birthday, she was called out by the Pharisees to make a wish that will be granted in a year and day - Perdita wishes to meet Queen Elizabeth.

At the summer fair, Perdita's older brother Robin introduces her to Adam, a boy whose family owns a manor house in Broomhill. They become friends and Perdita shares her wish to meet Queen Elizabeth. When Robin returns from school during Christmas Eve later that year, he brings Adam, who has been left alone by his guardians. Robin reveals a rumour that the Queen will visit Devonshire next summer, and Adam invites Perdita to the empty manor house where they have a party conjured by Adam's imagination. Throughout the year, Perdita hears fantastic stories from her father, her Great-Aunt Phoebe, mummers at Christmas, and a ship captain.

Just before Midsummer, the Queen passes through Broomhill, on her way to the great manor house owned by Adam's uncle. Perdita is unable to see Queen Elizabeth pass because she had eaten herself sick from gooseberries the day before, but Robin helps her see the Queen from the window. Although they are only able to see her from a distance, they are both deeply moved by the sight of the Queen. Hoping for another opportunity for Perdita to see the Queen in person, Robin asks Adam to find a way for Perdita to be presented to Queen Elizabeth. Adam sneaks into the Queen's garden to inform of her of Perdita's woes and begs for an invitation for Perdita to attend next evening's ball. Queen Elizabeth agrees.

Perdita and her family attend the ball, where Perdita is received by the Queen with Adam and Robin. Queen Elizabeth gives Perdita a knot of ribbons from her dress to wear as a favour, and promises the same to Robin and Adam when they meet her again as a successful sailor and farmer respectively. Years later, Perdita and Adam have married and have two children, and Perdita now has two Queen Elizabeth stories to tell her children: her mother's story and her own.
