= Sword at Sunset =

Book by Rosemary Sutcliff

- First edition
- Author: Rosemary Sutcliff
- Language: English
- Genre: Historical novel
- Publisher: Hodder & Stoughton
- Publication date: 1963
- Publication place: United Kingdom
- Media type: Print (hardback)
- Pages: 492 pp
- Preceded by: The Lantern Bearers
- Followed by: Dawn Wind

Sword at Sunset is a best-selling 1963 novel by Rosemary Sutcliff. One of her few historical novels written specifically for adults, it is her interpretation of the legend of King Arthur.

This is the first novel that Sutcliff wrote using a first-person singular point of view for her story. In an interview with Raymond H. Thompson (in 1986), she explained that she actually spent the eighteen months while writing this story thinking like a man and felt that the story was being fed to her.

Unlike most of the series The Eagle of the Ninth, it does not follow either the inheritor of the dolphin seal ring or the person who will eventually marry said inheritor; although three generations of inheritors, the protagonist of The Lantern Bearers, his son, and grandson, are minor characters in the book, the action follows the character of Artos (Arthur) as established in The Lantern Bearers.

== Plot ==
The events of the novel follow and continue those of The Lantern Bearers. Artos (Sutcliff's version of Arthur, his Latin given name being Artorius while Artos is a nickname meaning "bear" in Celtic) recalls his life as he lies near death, from the time when he served under his uncle, the British high king Ambrosius. He gathers a core cavalry group, Artos' Companions, who will be pivotal to the resistance of the British kingdoms to the invading Saxons. While visiting Arfon in North Wales, where he grew up, Artos meets a woman, Ygerna, who drugs and seduces him. He is unaware that the woman is his half-sister, and that her seduction was a deliberate plan to gain revenge against their father; Ygerna is Utha's daughter, whereas Artos is Utha's illegitimate son. Artos' seduction and the conception of Medraut (Mordred) is Ygerna's means of bringing ruin to Artos.

Artos marries Guenhumara (Guinevere) in order to bolster his forces with much needed troops. His relationship with her is difficult as a result of his previous involvement with Ygerna, and his best friend Bedwyr eventually betrays Artos by his involvement with Artos' wife.

Sutcliff presents the Arthur legend in a realistic manner, portraying Arthur as a historical figure, and excluding the grail quest, Merlin and many of the more fantastic elements of the legend. However many elements, such as the death of his daughter being linked to a Celtic 'curse', retain magical elements, but linked to Celtic religious practices. Indeed, Artos is shown as a man of two worlds, part Romano British, the descendant of the Romanised city-dwelling peoples of the South of Britain and part descendant of the more Celtic tribes of the mountains of Wales and Southern Scotland. The tension between these two cultures influences Artos's character, and his seduction by Ygerna. The battles in particular are described realistically. The Battle of Badon Hill is set at the Vale of the White Horse at Uffington and was planned out with the aid of a military advisor.

The story removes Lancelot, and gives the friend-and-lover's role to Bedwyr (old Welsh form of the name Bedivere). The name Ygerna is related to Igraine, Arthur's mother in legend, but she instead plays a role similar to that of Morgause and Morgan. Artos's father Utha (Uther Pendragon) is said to have died before the story begins, and Artos had previously been introduced in The Lantern Bearers as a boy and his uncle Ambrosius's young ward. Other characters familiar from Arthurian legend who are members of Arthur's Companions include Gwalchmai (Gawain) and Cei (Kay).

== As part of the Eagle of the Ninth series ==
Aquila, the main character of The Lantern Bearers, features as Artos' former teacher and one of his commanders. On the eve of a decisive battle, anticipating his own death, he entrusts the dolphin seal ring to Artos, to give it to his son Flavian after the battle (Chapter 29). Near the end of the book, Artos sends Flavian's son Minnow on an errand that will take him to safety before the final battle. Flavian has a short farewell with his son and then returns to Artos without the dolphin ring (Chapter 35). As suspected, Flavian dies in that battle.

== Adaptations ==
Sword at Sunset was adapted for the stage by playwright James Beagon and performed by the Edinburgh University Theatre Company from 25 February-1 March 2014 at Bedlam Theatre.
