= Rosemary Sutcliff =

English novelist (1920–1992)

Rosemary Sutcliff CBE
- Rosemary Sutcliff
- Born: 14 December 1920; East Clandon, Surrey, England
- Died: 23 July 1992 (aged 71); Chichester, West Sussex, England
- Occupation: Writer
- Writing career
- Genres: Children's historical fiction, myth and legend
- Notable works: The Eagle of the Ninth series; The Mark of the Horse Lord; Song for a Dark Queen; Blue Remembered Hills (autobiography)
- Notable awards: Carnegie Medal; 1959; Horn Book Award; 1972; Phoenix Award; 1985, 2010

Rosemary Sutcliff (14 December 1920 – 23 July 1992) was an English novelist best known for children's books, especially historical fiction and retellings of myths and legends. Although she was primarily a children's author, some of her novels were specifically written for adults. In a 1986 interview she said, "I would claim that my books are for children of all ages, from nine to ninety."

For her contribution as a children's writer Sutcliff was a runner-up for the Hans Christian Andersen Medal in 1974.

== Biography ==
Sutcliff was born 14 December 1920 to George Ernest Sutcliff and his wife Nessie Elizabeth, née Lawton, in East Clandon, Surrey. She spent her childhood in Malta and various naval bases where her father, a Royal Navy officer, was stationed. She was affected by Still's disease when she was very young, and used a wheelchair most of her life. Due to her chronic illness, Sutcliff spent most of her time with her mother from whom she learned many of the Celtic and Saxon legends that she would later expand into works of historical fiction. Sutcliff's early schooling was constantly interrupted by moving house and her illness. She did not learn to read until she was nine years of age, and left school at age 14 to enter the Bideford Art School, which she attended for three years, graduating from the General Art Course. Sutcliff then worked as a painter of miniatures.

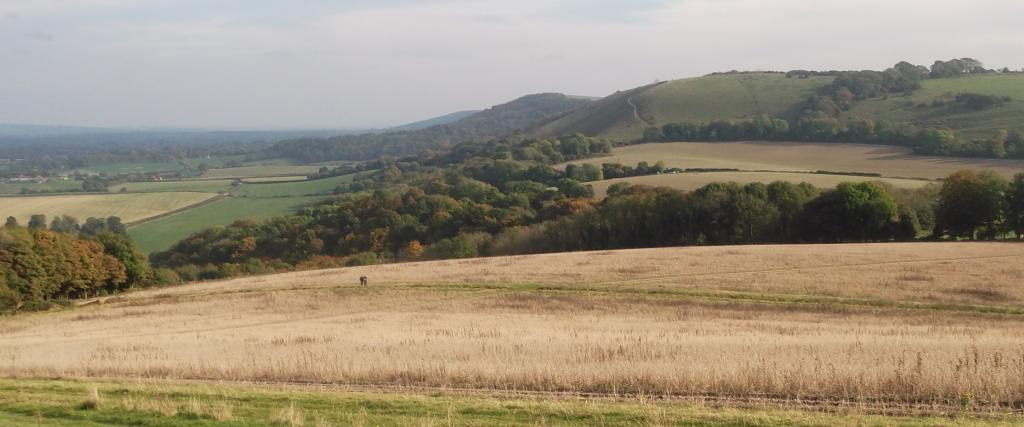
The South Downs near Sutcliff's long-time home in Sussex and the setting of several of her novels.

Inspired by the children's historical novels of Geoffrey Trease, her first published book was The Chronicles of Robin Hood in 1950. In 1954, she published what remains her best-known work The Eagle of the Ninth, part of a series on Roman Britain and its aftermath; they were not written as such or in sequential order but connected by the linking device of an emerald ring, passed down through generations of the same family. Between 1954 and 1958, Sutcliff's works The Eagle of the Ninth, its sequel The Silver Branch, Outcast and Warrior Scarlet were runners-up in the annual Carnegie Medal, given by the Library Association to the year's best children's book by a British subject. She finally won the Medal for her third book in the Eagle series, The Lantern Bearers (1959). (Note: Since 1995 there are usually eight books on the Carnegie shortlist. According to CCSU some runners up through 2002 were Commended (from 1954) or Highly Commended (from 1966). There were about 160 commendations of both kinds in 49 years including six each for 1954, 1956, and 1957; three each for 1958 and 1971 (none highly commended).) Where the first two books and one subsequent one were set in Roman Britain, The Lantern Bearers immediately follows the withdrawal of the Roman Empire, when the British people are threatened by remaining Germanic troops and by invaders.

Sutcliff was Carnegie runner-up again for her retelling of the Arthurian legend in Tristan and Iseult, which in 1971 won the American Horn Book Award. In 1985, The Mark of the Horse Lord was the inaugural winner of the Phoenix Award, created by the Children's Literature Association to recognise the best English-language children's book that did not win a major award when originally published twenty years earlier. The Shining Company won the same award in 2010.

In the 1975 Queen's Birthday Honours, she was appointed an Officer of the Order of the British Empire (OBE) for services to children's literature. She was promoted to Commander of the Order of the British Empire (CBE) in the 1992 New Year Honours.

Sutcliff lived for many years in Walberton near Arundel, Sussex. She wrote incessantly throughout her life and was still doing so on the morning of her death in 1992. Sutcliff never married and had no children.

== Books ==
=== Autobiography ===
- Blue Remembered Hills: A recollection (1983); Sutcliff's memoir of her childhood and young adulthood.

=== Other non-fiction ===
- Houses and History (London: Batsford, 1960), illustrated by William Stobbs
- Rudyard Kipling (1960), a monograph
- Heroes and History (1965), illus. Charles Keeping
- A Saxon Settler (People of the Past, 1965), illus. John Lawrence

=== Eagle of the Ninth series ===
The series, also referred to as 'Marcus', is linked by the Aquila family dolphin ring and listed here in fictional chronological order. (They were not written as a series by the author.)

1. The Eagle of the Ninth (1954), illus. C. Walter Hodges ‡
2. The Silver Branch (1957), illus. Charles Keeping ‡
3. Frontier Wolf (1980)
4. The Lantern Bearers (1959)
5. Sword at Sunset (1963); "officially for adults"
6. Dawn Wind (1961), illus. Charles Keeping
7. Sword Song (1997, posthumous)
8. The Shield Ring (1956), illus. C. Walter Hodges

‡ Three Legions (1980), or Eagle of the Ninth Chronicles (2010), is an omnibus edition of the original Eagle of the Ninth trilogy (The Eagle of the Ninth, The Silver Branch and The Lantern Bearers, 1954 to 1959).

=== Arthurian novels ===
Raymond Thompson credits Sutcliff with "some of the finest contemporary recreations of the Arthurian story" and names these seven works. The first two are also part of the Eagle of the Ninth series (above) that attempt to depict Arthur as an actual historical figure.

- The Lantern Bearers (1959)
- Sword at Sunset (1963)
- Tristan and Iseult (1971); retells the story of Tristan and Iseult
- The Arthurian Trilogy (inspired by Malory's Le Morte d'Arthur)
  - The Sword and the Circle (1981), illus. Shirley Felts
  - The Light Beyond the Forest (1979), illus. Shirley Felts
  - The Road to Camlann (1981), illus. Shirley Felts
- The Shining Company (1990); retells the Y Gododdin story (the earliest mention of Arthur's name)

King Arthur Stories: Three Books in One (1999), or The King Arthur Trilogy (2007), is an omnibus edition of the Arthurian Trilogy (1979 to 1981).

=== Other children's novels ===
- The Chronicles of Robin Hood (Oxford, 1950), illus. C. Walter Hodges—Sutcliff's first published book
- The Queen Elizabeth Story (1950) illus. C. Walter Hodges
- The Armourer's House (1951) illus. C. Walter Hodges
- Brother Dusty-Feet (1952), illus. by C. Walter Hodges
- Simon (1953), illus. Richard Kennedy, cover art by William Stobbs; set during the 17th-century English Civil War
- Outcast (1955), illus. Richard Kennedy
- Warrior Scarlet (1958), illus. Charles Keeping
- Knight's Fee (1960), illus. Charles Keeping
- Bridge Builders (1960), illus. Douglas Relf, about the building of Hadrian's Wall. Originally published as a short story in Another Six (Another 6): Stories by Richard Armstrong, William Mayne, Noel Streatfeild, Patricia Lynch, A. Philippa Pearce, Rosemary Sutcliff. UK: Blackwell, 1959.
- Beowulf: Dragonslayer (1961) illus. Charles Keeping; retells the Beowulf story
- The Hound of Ulster (1963), illus. Victor Ambrus; retells the story of Cúchulainn
- The Mark of the Horse Lord (1965), illus. Charles Keeping;
- The Chief's Daughter (1967), illus. Victor Ambrus;
- The High Deeds of Finn MacCool (1967), illus. Michael Charleton
- A Circlet of Oak Leaves (1968), illus. Victor Ambrus
- The Witch's Brat (1970), illus. Richard Lebenson
- The Truce of the Games (1971), illus. Victor Ambrus
- Heather, Oak, and Olive (1972), illus. Victor Ambrus; a collection of three dramatic stories: "The Chief's Daughter", "A Circlet of Oak Leaves", and "A Crown of Wild Olive" (originally published as "The Truce of the Games")
- The Capricorn Bracelet (1973), illus. Charles Keeping (later, Richard Cuffari); six stories, linked by a Roman armilla, that originated as radio scripts (Note: The Capricorn Bracelet (1973) is a collection of six inter-connected short stories, following several generations of Roman soldiers serving at Hadrian's Wall from the 1st to the 4th centuries. In the author's note Sutcliff says that they began as scripts about Roman Scotland, written for BBC Radio Scotland as part of a series called Stories from Scottish History. She gives no dates; the series ran from 1947 to 1972.)
- The Changeling (1974), illus. Victor Ambrus
- We Lived in Drumfyvie (1975), by Sutcliff and Margaret Lyford-Pike. "The authors combine their talents to recreate 700 years in the life of an imaginary Scottish burgh. The folk of Drumfyvie tell their own stories."
- Blood Feud (1976), illus. Charles Keeping. Adapted as a TV movie in 1990, titled Sea Dragon.
- Sun Horse, Moon Horse (1977), illus. Shirley Felts
- Shifting Sands (1977), illus. Laslzo Acs
- Song for a Dark Queen (1978); retells the story of Queen Boudica
- Eagle's Egg (1981), illus. Victor Ambrus
- Bonnie Dundee (1983), the story of John Graham, 1st Viscount of Dundee, and the Jacobite rising of 1689
- Flame-coloured Taffeta (1986), illus. Rachel Birkett
- The Roundabout Horse (1986) illus. Alan Marks
- A Little Dog Like You (1987) illus. Jane Johnson
- The Best of Rosemary Sutcliff (1987), illus. Charles Keeping—omnibus edition of Warrior Scarlet, The Mark of the Horse Lord, and Knight's Fee (1958–1965)
- Little Hound Found (1989) illus. Joy Davies
- The Minstrel and the Dragon Pup (1993, posthumous), illus. by Emma Chichester Clark; also serialised in Cricket
- Black Ships Before Troy (1993, posth.), illus. Alan Lee; retells the Iliad story; also serialised in Cricket
- Chess-Dream in a Garden (1993, posth.), illus. Ralph Thompson A fantasy for children inspired by the Lewis Chessmen.
- The Wanderings of Odysseus (1995, posth.), illus. Alan Lee; retells the Odyssey story

=== Novels for adults ===
- Lady in Waiting (1957); set in Tudor England, the story of Bess Throckmorton, wife of Sir Walter Raleigh
- The Rider of the White Horse (1959); set during the 17th-century English Civil War, about Parliamentarian general Sir Thomas Fairfax and his wife Anne who travelled on campaign with him
- Sword at Sunset (1963); set in sub-Roman Britain, a story of King Arthur as the Romano-Celtic warrior prince he may have been; part of The Eagle of the Ninth series
- The Flowers of Adonis (1969); set in ancient Greece, about the brilliant but erratic Athenian general Alkibiades and the Peloponnesian War
- Blood and Sand (1987); set during the Napoleonic Wars, based on the life of the soldier Thomas Keith. (Note: Thomas Keith was a young Scottish soldier in the 78th Highlanders regiment, captured in Egypt by Turkish forces during the Alexandria expedition of 1807. He converted to Islam, took the name Ibrahim Aga, and became governor of Medina in 1815. (See The Adventures of Thomas Keith in Ch. 12 of James Grant's The Scottish Soldiers of Fortune, pub. 1889))

== Other works ==
=== Plays, screenplays and film ===
- The New Laird. Radio play (BBC Schools Radio series Stories from Scottish History), Broadcast 17 May 1966.
- Ghost Story. Film. Screenplay with Stephen Weeks and Philip Norman, 1974.
- Mary Bedell. Stage play. Produced London, 1986.
- The Eagle of the Ninth. Stage play with Mary Rensten.

=== Articles ===
- "History Is People". A paper distributed at a conference on Children's Literature in Education, Exeter, England, 1971. Reprinted in Children and Literature: Views and Reviews, edited by Virginia Haviland, pp. 305–312 Scott, Foresman 1973, pp. 305–312
- "Combined Ops". Junior Bookshelf 24 (July 1960):121–27. Reprinted in Egoff, Only Connect: Readings on Children's Literature, 1st ed., pp. 244–48; 2d ed., pp. 284–88. Describes the process of writing Eagle of the Ninth and The Lantern Bearers.

== Collected papers ==
In 1966 Sutcliff made a small donation to the de Grummond Children's Literature Collection at the University of Southern Mississippi in Hattiesburg, Mississippi. (In this she responded to Lena Grummond's international call for original materials to establish the Collection.) The Sutcliff Papers include a manuscript and two typescripts for the radio play The New Laird. That programme was taped 4 April 1966 and broadcast from Edinburgh on 17 May 1966 as part of the Stories from Scottish History series (BBC Radio Scotland). The collection also includes a small red composition book of research notes for The Lantern Bearers and for two unpublished works, The Amber Dolphin and The Red Dragon.

== Works about Sutcliff ==
- Margaret Meek, Rosemary Sutcliff, New York, Henry Z. Walck, (1962), a brief biographical monograph and critical study.
- John Rowe Townsend, "Rosemary Sutcliff", a critical essay in A Sense of Story: Essays on Contemporary Writers for Children, London, Longman, 1971, pp. 193–99. Reissued as A Sounding of Storytellers (1979).
- Barbara L. Talcroft, Death of the Corn King: King and Goddess in Rosemary Sutcliff's Historical Novels for Young Adults, Metuchen, New Jersey and London: The Scarecrow Press, 1995.
- Miriam Youngerman Miller, "The Rhythm of a Tongue: Literary Dialect in Rosemary Sutcliff's Novels of the Middle Ages for Children", Children's Literature Association Quarterly 19:1, Spring 1994, pp. 25–31.
- Hilary Wright, Shadows on the Downs: Some Influences of Rudyard Kipling on Rosemary Sutcliff. Children's Literature in Education 12, No. 2:90-102 (Summer 1981)
- The Search for Selfhood: The Historical Novels of Rosemary Sutcliff. TLS : Essays and Reviews from the Times Literary Supplement, 17 June 1965, p. 498. Reprinted in Only Connect: Readings on children's literature, ed. Sheila Egoff et al. Toronto New York: Oxford University Press (Canadian Branch), 1969, pp. 249–255.
- Abby Mims, Rosemary Sutcliff in British Writers: Supplement 16. Ed. Jay Parini. Detroit: Charles Scribner's Sons, 2010. Web: Gale Literature Resource Center.

== Awards ==
The biennial Hans Christian Andersen Award conferred by the International Board on Books for Young People is the highest recognition available to a writer or illustrator of children's books. Sutcliff was one of three runners-up for the writing award in 1974 (and the British nominee in 1968 as well).

She won several awards for particular works.

- 1959 Carnegie Medal, The Lantern Bearers
- 1971 Zilveren Griffel (the Dutch Silver Pencil), The Chronicles of Robin Hood
- 1972 Boston Globe–Horn Book Award for Fiction, Tristan and Iseult
- 1978 The Children's Rights Workshop's Other Award, Song for a Dark Queen
- 1985 Phoenix Award, The Mark of the Horse Lord (1965)
- 2010 Phoenix Award, The Shining Company (1990)

Besides winning the 1959 Carnegie Medal, Sutcliff was a commended runner-up five times. Alan Lee, who illustrated Sutcliff's posthumously published retellings of The Iliad and The Odyssey, won the companion Kate Greenaway Medal for the former, Black Ships Before Troy (1993).
