= 1970 in literature =

This article contains information about the literary events and publications of 1970.

== Events ==
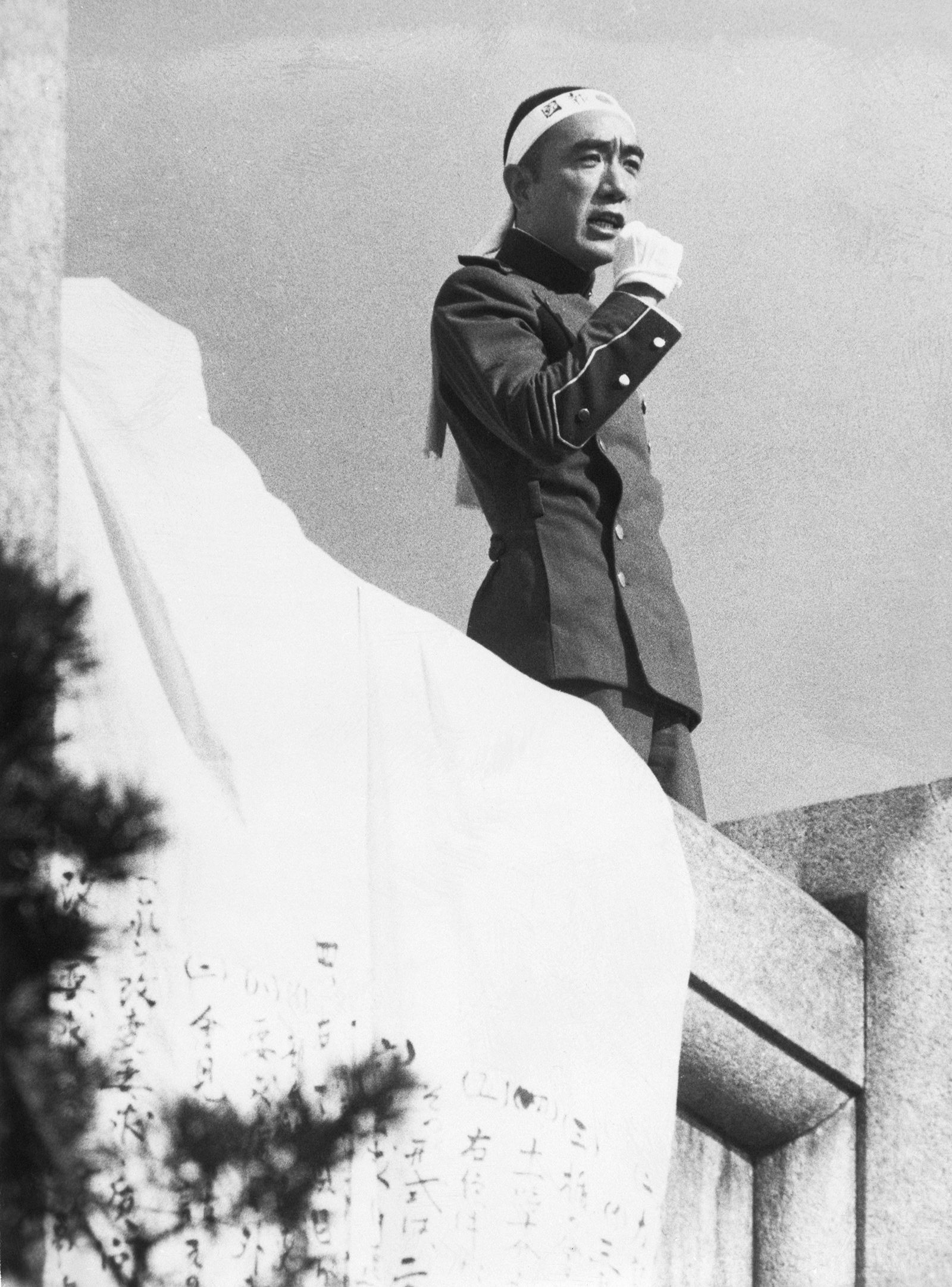
Yukio Mishima delivering his speech on the balcony, 25 November 1970

- January 16 – The Düsseldorfer Schauspielhaus opens with a performance of Georg Büchner's Dantons Tod.
- March – Magdalena Mouján's story "Gu ta Gutarrak" ("We and Ours") in Basque is suppressed by the authorities in Francoist Spain.
- June 10 – The English novelist Anthony Burgess delivers an inflammatory lecture, "Obscenity and the Arts", at the University of Malta; its reception leads to him leaving Malta. He has begun a novel that will become Earthly Powers (1980).
- June 17 – The première of David Storey's play Home at the Royal Court Theatre, London, is directed by Lindsay Anderson and stars Sir John Gielgud and Sir Ralph Richardson.
- August 21 – The Penguin Books paperback imprint is acquired by Pearson PLC, following the death of its owner Sir Allen Lane.
- August 27 – Britain's Royal Shakespeare Company introduces a revolutionary production of William Shakespeare's A Midsummer Night's Dream directed by Peter Brook, at the Royal Shakespeare Theatre, Stratford-upon-Avon.
- November 20 – The playwright Fadil Paçrami becomes Chairman of the Parliament of Albania.
- November 25 – Mishima Incident: In Tokyo, the Japanese author and Tatenokai militia leader Yukio Mishima (三島由紀夫, 45) and others take over the headquarters of the Japan Self-Defense Forces in an attempted coup d'état. Mishima commits seppuku (public ritual suicide) when he fails to sway the public to his right-wing politics, which include restoring the powers of the Emperor.
- December 5 – Dario Fo premières his play Accidental Death of an Anarchist (Morte accidentale di un anarchico) at Varese in Italy.
- unknown dates
  - Len Deighton's Bomber, set on June 31 [sic.] 1943, becomes the first published novel to have been written on a word processor, an IBM MT/ST.
  - The novel Deliverance by the American poet James Dickey is published; it will go on to be named among the 100 best English-language novels of the 20th century by an editorial board of the American Modern Library.
  - An unexpurgated edition of John Cleland's Fanny Hill (Memoirs of a Woman of Pleasure, 1748–1749) appears in the U.K. without legal challenge.
  - Bohumil Hrabal's books Domácí úkoly (Home Work) and Poupata (Buds) are suppressed by the communist authorities in Czechoslovakia.

== New books ==
=== Fiction ===
- Dritëro Agolli – Komisari Memo (Commissar Memo)
- Poul Anderson – Tau Zero
- Abdelhamid ben Hadouga - The South Wind (novel)
- Thomas Berger – Vital Parts
- Thomas Bernhard – The Lime Works (Das Kalkwerk)
- Melvyn Bragg – A Place in England
- John Braine – Stay with Me Till Morning
- Wallace Breem – Eagle in the Snow
- Jimmy Breslin – The Gang That Couldn't Shoot Straight
- Agatha Christie – Passenger to Frankfurt
- Robertson Davies – Fifth Business
- L. Sprague de Camp
  - The Reluctant Shaman and Other Fantastic Tales
  - Warlocks and Warriors (ed.)
- Samuel R. Delany – The Fall of the Towers (trilogy)
- Michel Déon – Les Poneys sauvages
- James Dickey – Deliverance
- Joan Didion – Play It as It Lays
- José Donoso – The Obscene Bird of Night (El obsceno pájaro de la noche)
- Lawrence Durrell – Nunquam
- Vincent Eri – The Crocodile
- Nuruddin Farah – From a Crooked Rib
- J. G. Farrell – Troubles
- Juan Goytisolo – Count Julian (Reivindicación del conde don Julián)
- Pierre Guyotat - Eden, Eden, Eden (Éden, Éden, Éden)
- L. P. Hartley – My Sisters' Keeper
- Anne Hébert – Kamouraska
- Ernest Hemingway – Islands in the Stream
- Susan Hill – I'm the King of the Castle
- Pamela Hansford Johnson – The Honours Board
- Anna Kavan – Julia and the Bazooka
- Jaan Kross – Between Three Plagues (part 1)
- Halldór Laxness – Innansveitarkronika
- Ira Levin – This Perfect Day
- Mario Levrero – La ciudad
- H. P. Lovecraft – The Horror in the Museum and Other Revisions
- Peter Lovesey – Wobble to Death
- John D. MacDonald – The Long Lavender Look
- Eric Malpass – Oh My Darling Daughter
- Ngaio Marsh – When in Rome
- Yukio Mishima (三島由紀夫) – The Decay of the Angel (天人五衰, Tennin Gosui; last in The Sea of Fertility tetralogy)
- Brian Moore – Fergus
- Toni Morrison – The Bluest Eye
- Mitiarjuk Nappaaluk – Harpoon of the Hunter (ᐊᖑᓇᓱᑦᑎᐅᑉ ᓇᐅᒃᑯᑎᖓ)
- Larry Niven – Ringworld
- John Jay Osborn, Jr. – The Paper Chase
- Abel Posse – Los bogavantes
- Mary Renault – Fire from Heaven
- Kurban Said – Ali and Nino
- Erich Segal – Love Story
- Sidney Sheldon – The Naked Face
- Clark Ashton Smith – Other Dimensions
- Manuel Scorza – Drums for Rancas
- Muriel Spark – The Driver's Seat
- Mary Stewart – The Crystal Cave
- Alan Sillitoe – A Start in Life
- Leon Uris – QB VII
- Jack Vance – The Pnume
- Gore Vidal – Two Sisters
- Patrick White – The Vivisector
- Venedikt Yerofeyev – Moscow-Petushki (Moscow to the End of the Line; samizdat publication)
- Roger Zelazny – Nine Princes in Amber

=== Children and young people ===
- Lloyd Alexander – The Marvelous Misadventures of Sebastian
- Rev. W. Awdry – Duke the lost Engine (twenty-fifth in The Railway Series of 42 books by him and his son Christopher Awdry)
- Richard Bach – Jonathan Livingston Seagull
- Nina Bawden – The Birds on the Trees
- Judy Blume – Are You There, God? It's Me, Margaret
- John Burningham – Mr Gumpy's Outing
- Betsy Byars – Summer of the Swans
- John Christopher (Sam Youd) – The Guardians (science fiction)
- Roald Dahl – Fantastic Mr Fox
- Leon Garfield and Edward Blishen – The God Beneath the Sea
- Judith Kerr – Mog the Forgetful Cat (first in the Mog series of 17 books)
- Ruth Manning-Sanders – A Book of Devils and Demons
- Dr. Seuss – Mr. Brown Can Moo! Can You?
- Ruth Park
  - The Muddle-Headed Wombat in the Springtime
  - The Muddle-Headed Wombat on the River
- Bill Peet
  - The Whingdingdilly
  - The Wump World
- Maurice Sendak – In the Night Kitchen
- Isaac Bashevis Singer – A Day of Pleasure: Stories of a Boy Growing Up in Warsaw
- E. B. White – The Trumpet Of The Swan
- Annette Tison and Talus Taylor - Barbapapa

=== Drama ===
- Ama Ata Aidoo – Anowa
- Robert Bolt – Vivat! Vivat Regina!
- Dario Fo – Accidental Death of an Anarchist
- Michael Frayn – The Two of Us (4 1-act plays)
- Trevor Griffiths – Occupations
- Christopher Hampton – The Philanthropist
- Lorraine Hansberry – Les Blancs
- Welcome Msomi – uMabatha
- Terence Rattigan – A Bequest to the Nation
- Anthony Shaffer – Sleuth
- Alexander Vampilov – Duck Hunting (Утиная охота, Utinaya okhota, published; first performed 1976)
- Derek Walcott – Dream on Monkey Mountain

=== Poetry ===
- L. Sprague de Camp – Demons and Dinosaurs
- Ted Hughes – Crow

=== Non-fiction ===
- Theodor W. Adorno (posthumously) – Aesthetic Theory (Asthetische Theorie)
- Hannah Arendt – On Violence
- Roland Barthes – S/Z
- Pierre Berton – The National Dream
- Jim Bouton – Ball Four
- Dee Brown – Bury My Heart at Wounded Knee
- James MacGregor Burns – Roosevelt: The Soldier Of Freedom
- Henri Charrière – Papillon
- Elizabeth David – Spices, Salt and Aromatics in the English Kitchen
- Edward De Bono – Lateral Thinking: creativity step by step
- August Derleth – Thirty Years of Arkham House, 1939-1969: A History and Bibliography
- Michel Foucault – Les Mots et les choses: Une archéologie des sciences humaines (The Order of Things: An Archaeology of the Human Sciences)
- Germaine Greer – The Female Eunuch
- Helene Hanff – 84 Charing Cross Road
- Arthur Janov – The Primal Scream
- Uwe Johnson – Anniversaries. From the Life of Gesine Cresspahl (Jahrestage: Aus dem Leben von Gesine Cresspahl; begins publication)
- Hal Lindsey – The Late Great Planet Earth
- Christopher Lloyd – The Well-Tempered Garden
- Norman Mailer – Of a Fire on the Moon
- Dumas Malone – Jefferson the President: First Term, 1801-1805
- Mahathir Mohamad – The Malay Dilemma
- Kate Millett – Sexual Politics
- Nancy Mitford – Frederick the Great
- Robin Morgan (ed.) – Sisterhood Is Powerful: An Anthology of Writings from the Women's Liberation Movement
- Harold Perkin – The Age of the Railway
- J. B. Priestley – The Edwardians
- Albert Speer – Inside the Third Reich
- Alvin Toffler – Future Shock

== Births ==
- January 25 – Stephen Chbosky, American novelist and screenwriter
- February 28 – Daniel Handler, American novelist
- March 6 – Simona Vinci, Italian fiction writer
- March 12 – Dave Eggers, American writer, editor and publisher
- March 20 – Michele Jaffe, American author
- March 26 – Martin McDonagh, British-born Irish playwright
- May 20 – Dorthe Nors, Danish fiction writer
- May 26 – Alex Garland, English novelist
- June 6 – Sarah Dessen, American novelist
- July 22 – Doug Johnstone, Scottish crime fiction writer
- August 27 - Ann Aguirre, American speculative fiction writer
- September 10 – Phaswane Mpe, South African novelist (died 2004)
- September 16 – Nick Sagan, American novelist and screenwriter
- October 27 – Jonathan Stroud, English fantasy writer
- November 7 – Chris Adrian, American novelist
- November 24 – Marlon James, Jamaican novelist
- November 27 – Han Kang, South Korean novelist
- December 21 – Mohamedou Ould Salahi, Mauritanian author and former Guantánamo detainee
- unknown dates
  - Raja'a Alem, Saudi Arabian writer
  - Roberta Dapunt, Italian poet
  - Nathan Englander, American novelist and short story writer
  - Neel Mukherjee, Indian novelist
  - Faruk Šehić, Bosnian poet and fiction writer

== Deaths ==
- January 10 – Charles Olson, American modernist poet (liver cancer, born 1910)
- January 29 – B. H. Liddell Hart, English military historian (born 1895)
- February 2 – Bertrand Russell, English philosopher (born 1872)
- February 4 – Louise Bogan, American poet (born 1897)
- February 20 – Sophie Treadwell, American dramatist and journalist (born 1885)
- February 21 – Johannes Semper, Estonian writer, translator and politician (born 1892)
- March 11 – Erle Stanley Gardner, American writer (born 1889)
- March 15 – Arthur Adamov, Russian-French playwright (born 1908)
- March 21 – Marlen Haushofer, Austrian novelist (born 1920)
- March 29 – Vera Brittain, English novelist, memoirist and poet (born 1893)
- April 11 – John O'Hara, American novelist (cardiovascular disease, born 1905)
- May 7 – Jack Jones, Welsh novelist (born 1884)
- May 12 – Nelly Sachs, Jewish German poet and dramatist (born 1891)
- June 2 – Giuseppe Ungaretti, Italian modernist poet and writer (born 1888)
- June 3 – Ruth Sawyer, American children's writer and novelist (born 1880)
- June 7 – E. M. Forster, English novelist (born 1879)
- June 16 – Elsa Triolet, French novelist (born 1896)
- July 7 – Allen Lane, English publisher (born 1902)
- July 15 – Eric Berne, Canadian-born psychiatrist and author (heart attack, born 1910)
- September 1 – François Mauriac, French novelist (born 1885)
- September 25 – Erich Maria Remarque, German novelist (All Quiet On The Western Front) (born 1898)
- September 28 – John Dos Passos, American novelist (born 1896)
- October 18 – Máirtín Ó Cadhain, Irish language writer (born 1906)
- November 23 – Alf Prøysen, Norwegian author, musician and children's writer (born 1914)
- November 25 – Yukio Mishima (三島 由紀夫), Japanese author (seppuku, born 1925)
- unknown date – Racey Helps, English children's author and illustrator (born 1913)

== Awards ==
- Nobel Prize for Literature: Aleksandr Solzhenitsyn

=== Canada ===
- See 1970 Governor General's Awards for a complete list of winners and finalists for those awards.

=== France ===
- Prix Goncourt: Michel Tournier, Le Roi des Aulnes
- Prix Médicis French: Camille Bourniquel, Sélinonte ou la Chambre impériale
- Prix Médicis International: Luigi Malerba, Saut de la mort

=== United Kingdom ===
- Booker Prize: Bernice Rubens, The Elected Member
- Carnegie Medal for children's literature: Leon Garfield and Edward Blishen, The God Beneath the Sea
- Cholmondeley Award: Kathleen Raine, Douglas Livingstone, Edward Brathwaite
- Eric Gregory Award: Helen Frye, Paul Mills, John Mole, Brian Morse, Alan Perry, Richard Tibbitts
- James Tait Black Memorial Prize for fiction: Lily Powell, The Bird of Paradise
- James Tait Black Memorial Prize for biography: Jasper Ridley, Lord Palmerston
- Queen's Gold Medal for Poetry: Roy Fuller

=== United States ===
- Hugo Award:
  - Best Novella: Fritz Leiber, Ship of Shadows
  - Best Novella: Ursula K. Le Guin, The Left Hand of Darkness
- Nebula Award: Larry Niven, Ringworld
- Newbery Medal for children's literature: William H. Armstrong, Sounder
- Pulitzer Prize:
  - Drama: Charles Gordone, No Place To Be Somebody
  - Fiction: Jean Stafford, Collected Stories
  - Poetry: Richard Howard, Untitled Subjects

=== Elsewhere ===
- Alfaguara Prize: Carlos Droguett, Todas esas muertes
- Friedenspreis des Deutschen Buchhandels: Alva Myrdal and Gunnar Myrdal (together)
- Miles Franklin Award: Dal Stivens, A Horse of Air
- Premio Nadal: Jesús Fernández Santos, Libro de las memorias de las cosas
- Viareggio Prize: Nello Saito, Dentro e fuori

== Notes ==
- Hahn, Daniel (2015). The Oxford Companion to Children's Literature (2nd ed.). Oxford. University Press. ISBN 9780198715542.
