= London International Festival of Theatre =

International theatre festival in London

LIFT
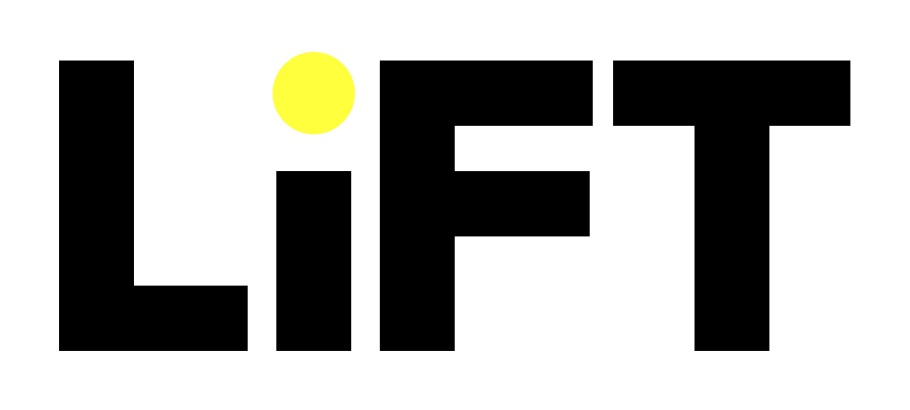
- Artistic director: Kris Nelson
- Website: liftfestival.com

The London International Festival of Theatre (LIFT) is a biennial festival of theatre, performance and cultural events in London. The organisation also supports year-round activity. It was founded by Rose Fenton and Lucy Neal, with the first festival in 1981 hoping to 'challenge British theatre and open a window on the world'. LIFT's current artistic director is Kris Nelson.

Lyn Gardner of The Guardian wrote of LIFT in 2014, "Probably no theatre organisation in the UK has done more to break down the distinctions between artforms than LIFT, which over the last 30 years has not only offered us a first glimpse of work by world-class theatre makers, but also offered space for first-hand theatrical dispatches from artists living with conflict and under oppression who find space denied them in their own country."

== History ==
Rose Fenton and Lucy Neal founded LIFT as young graduates from Warwick University. The inaugural festival was staged from 3 to 16 August 1981.^{:4} The 'ambitious programme of politically engaged theatre' saw artists from Brazil, Poland, Malaysia, Japan and Holland perform in venues across London, alongside British artists.^{:4} The performances presented in the festival had never been seen in the UK before and were experimental and political in nature. Sue Arnold, a regular columnist at The Observer, impressed by the hard work of Fenton and Neal, wrote: "if the Festival is not a phenomenal success I shall eat an entire millinery collection without demur".

LIFT was the first international festival of theatre in England. It received from patrons and trustees such as Peter Ustinov and Lady Molly Daubeny (the widow of Sir Peter Daubeny founder of World Theatre Seasons). Through 1987, the festival received significant support from the Greater London Council (GLC), which had recently come under the leadership of Ken Livingstone.^{:4} This included 'significant financial grants' as well as facilitating 'cross-sector collaboration between arts organizations of all sizes'.^{:5}

LIFT continued to grow through 2001 with a biennial Festival programmed by Fenton and Neal . During this time they brought some of the world's most important theatre-makers, found emergent artists from countries all over the globe and produced events across London with international and national artists such as Les Comedients and Christophe Berthonneau. LIFT premiered Ariel Dorfman's Death and the Maiden, experimented with the form of theatre with pieces such as the labyrinth show Oraculos and commissions such as Deborah Warner's St Pancras Project, Bobby Baker's Grown-Up School and Theatre-Rites' House. Fenton and Neal also brought international theatre-makers such as Robert Lepage, Romeo Castellucci and De La Guarda to the UK for the first time.

In 2001, they launched the 'LIFT Enquiry' to open up spaces to discuss the purpose and possibilities of theatre and festivals at the start of the new millennium. This saw LIFT break away from the structure of a biennial festival and program international and national artists as part of smaller seasons of work alongside workshops, talks, residencies and projects. In 2004, after 25 years, Fenton and Neal announced they would be stepping down as directors of the Festival. Angharad Wynne-Jones was appointed director of the festival, and oversaw the LIFT 2008 festival before Mark Ball was appointed artistic director in 2009. Since then, LIFT has returned to its biennial format with festivals in 2010, 2012, 2014, 2016 and 2018.

== Festivals ==
=== LIFT 2010 ===
LIFT 2010 (19 June-17 July) was a presentation of theatre from the Middle East and North Africa, such as Aftermath in The Old Vic Tunnels and Hobb Story.

Also, with seven UK premieres and five shows new to London, LIFT 2010 included new work from Dutch theatre-maker Dries Verhoeven, who linked audiences at the National Theatre live to performers in Sri Lanka, Israel's Nalaga'at Theatre, the world's only professional company of deaf blind performers, a weekend of social game playing on an international theme from Hide&Seek, and a new symphony for ice cream vans by the composer and theatre-maker Dan Jones.

=== 2011 LIFT's 30th Birthday ===
LIFT took part in Shubbak with two productions from Egypt and Lebanon. It also hosted 20 young festival producers from across Europe in a three-day training academy as part of the Festlab initiative. Luke Jerram's Sky Orchestra sent seven hot air balloons that took off at dawn and flew over London with a melody specially created by composer Dan Jones.

In addition, LIFT spent 2011 working with seven schools across London exploring the possibilities of theatre through the LIFT Living Archive and using the Olympic Games as a catalyst to create their own special event. And also joined forces with Homo Novus in Riga, Latvia and Newcastle's Wunderbar to create Distance, a roaming performance festival that explored the relationship with distance.

=== LIFT 2012 ===
LIFT 2012 (12 June-15 July) included 21 productions from 15 different countries in a five-week festival of international theatre, seen by over 43,000 audience members.

The festival went to the West End for the first time in its history with Elevator Repair Service's Gatz, that "beautifully captures the elegiac tone of the book with its sense of the dissolving, essentially agrarian American Dream". It also established a partnership with the Royal Shakespeare Company's World Shakespeare Festival, co-commissioning three new international productions from Dreamthinkspeak, Iraqi Theatre Company and Artistes, Producteurs, Associés.

LIFT 2012 continued to feature artists from the Middle East and the Arab world, as well as artists from Iran, with Unfinished Dream by Hamid Pourazari; Belarus, with Minsk 2011 by Belarus Free Theatre; and Brazil, with The Dark Side of Love by Renato Rocha.

=== LIFT 2013 ===
While working on the LIFT 2014 festival, the organisation maintained its cultural programme as producer, commissioner and partnership of networks such as House on Fire, Imagine 2020 and Festival in Transition or Live art UK.

The main activity during those months was to focus on giving support to small or medium size companies which LIFT had worked with before like the Belarus Free Theatre that presented its new project Trash Cuisine. Also, LIFT worked in close collaboration with Derry-Londonderry, 2013 City of the Culture Political Mother: Derry-Londonderry Uncut, a re-working of Hofesh Shechter Company's work Political Mother: Choreographer's cut supporting 12 Derry musicians to join the band for the performance. Working with dancers from Hofesh Shechter Company and 5 local dance groups LIFT producer Political Mother: Shortcuts, a series of sigh specific dance pieces performed in the city of Derry created in response to the themes and dance vocabulary of Political Mother.

Whilst in Derry LIFT also worked with Boat Magazine to produce a limited edition newspaper version of their nomadic magazine about the people, culture and life of the city.

Finally, LIFT organised a conference on how artists respond to archives ‘Past Is The Prologue’, and a festival hack where developers, programmers, coders and artists came together to create prototype digital projects responding to the themes of LIFT.

=== LIFT 2014 ===
LIFT 2014 was the 20th edition of LIFT. In the brochure for the 2014 Festival, Artistic Director Mark Ball wrote:

'LIFT 2014 platforms a gorgeous diversity of work that wouldn't otherwise be seen in London. Without sounding overzealous, we believe that much of this work is political and engages with the big ideas of our times: freedom, justice, and environmental and technological change. Whether it's thinking about the history of censorship in the Soviet Union, the impact of global warming or the distribution of water, the work is eye-opening, witty and entertaining, with dollops of music, visual culture and animated debate thrown into the mix.'

The festival, which began on 2 June, hosted 30 productions from 13 countries that played in 14 venues across London. The programme included The Roof a three-dimensional free-running performance and A Journey on Foot at Dusk which invited audiences to participate in a Haitian-inspired funeral procession.

The 2014 festival saw the beginning of a collaboration with artists from South-America with productions from Brazilian choreographer Bruno Beltrao, Brazilian director Renato Rocha and Argentinian Lola Arias whose The Year I was Born was based around the stories of people who grew up under the Pinochet dictatorship in Chile.

=== LIFT 2016 ===
LIFT 2016 ran from 1 June until 2 July with a debut performance from Taylor Mac. The festival programme included 25 productions, 6 of which were commissions or co-commissions. One of these was Depart, a Circa production involving circus artists, choral singers, designers and musicians and took place in Tower Hamlets cemetery park. British playwright and director Neil Bartlett was commissioned to write Stella, which takes one half on the Victorian cross-dressing duo Fanny and Stella as its subject and saw Hoxton Hall become a LIFT venue for the very first time. The festival events also included talks with The Wooster Group and Peter Brook and for the first time involved the UpLIFTers from LIFT Tottenham who became an official festival Jury as part of The Children's Choice Awards.

=== LIFT 2018 ===
LIFT 2018 took place from 25 May and ran until 22 July. The festival programme included 17 productions, 10 of which are commissions or co-commissions, 5 world premieres and 8 UK premieres. One of these is SESSION, a Tottenham original production involving young dancers, live afrobeats music, designers and musicians which will take place in Bernie Grant Arts Centre. The festival was programmed by Mark Ball, David Binder and executive directed by Beki Bateson.

American playwright and actress Anna Deavere Smith returned to the Royal Court Theatre for her first London appearance in 25 years with Notes From The Field, her Obie-award-winning play which tells the story of the students, parents, teachers and staff caught up in America's school-to-prison pipeline.

== LIFT Tottenham ==
LIFT Tottenham began in January 2015, the programme works in and around Tottenham, collaborating with local artists, young people and organisations in the area to produce art work with a particular focus on participatory work engaging non-professional performers with arts opportunities.

=== Tottenham Artist Hangout ===
LIFT's first artist gathering was held in March 2015 at the Bernie Grants Arts Centre. The event was organised with the intention of engaging with local artists, over 50 of whom attended. There was a particular focus on establishing artists who would work alongside the Mammalian Diving Reflex as part of the Super UpLIFTers project.

=== UpLIFTers ===
This is a five-year partnership between LIFT, the Mammalian Diving Reflex and two Tottenham schools; Duke's Aldridge Academy (formerly Northumberland Park Community School) and The Vale School. Primarily targeting year 7 students, the project aims to introduce young people to the arts and enable them to create their own participatory art.
