= Peggy Ramsay =

Theatrical agent

- Born: Margaret Francesca Venniker; 27 May 1908; Molong, New South Wales, Australia
- Died: 4 September 1991 (aged 83); London, United Kingdom
- Occupation: Theatrical Agent

Margaret Francesca Ramsay (27 May 1908 - 4 September 1991) was an Australian-born British theatrical agent.

== Early life ==
Peggy Ramsay was born to English parents in Molong, New South Wales, Australia. Her father's name was originally Vilenski, but her mother believed this Jewish name was a social drawback so had it changed to Venniker. Her family had settled in South Africa by the end of the Great War, in which her father served in the South African Medical Corps. During a brief and unhappy marriage, she came to England in 1929; her husband Norman Ramsay was under investigation in South Africa. After touring with an opera company, and a spell as an actress, she began reading scripts for theatrical managers including Peter Daubeny, who was later known for organising annual World Theatre Seasons.

== Theatrical agent ==
As she was gaining no financial return from scripts she was finding, in 1953 her friends and acquaintances persuaded her to open her own agency, in which they invested. For her entire career her business was based in Goodwin's Court, an alley off St Martin's Lane, London. She was able to buy out her partners in 1963, after the success of her first "discovery'", Robert Bolt. Sometimes she could be wrong in her opinions. Of A Man for All Seasons (1966), Bolt's own screen adaptation of his play, she was dismissive: "We don’t expect it to succeed as it’s not very dramatic and has no sex at all".

She represented many of the leading dramatists to emerge from the 1950s onwards, including Alan Ayckbourn, Eugène Ionesco, J. B. Priestley, Stephen Poliakoff and David Hare. After discovering Joe Orton, then living on National Assistance, she persuaded producer Michael Codron to stage Orton's Entertaining Mr Sloane. Ramsay represented the dramatist, and then his estate, for the rest of her life. The 1978 biography of Orton by John Lahr, initiated by Ramsay in 1970, led to friction between the author and the playwright's former agent. For about ten years, she consulted her client, David Hare, about the quality of the work of other writers represented by her agency.

Ramsay's last years were affected by the onset of Alzheimer's disease. Her long-term companion, the actor William Roderick, died in April 1991. She died on 4 September 1991 in London from the effects of a heart condition and circulation problems.

== Legacy ==
The Peggy Ramsay Foundation has been established by her estate and makes grants and awards to help writers and writing for the stage. Her archive has been donated to the British Library. In 2009, a blue plaque was unveiled at Ramsay's former home in Kensington Place, Brighton by her friend and biographer Simon Callow.

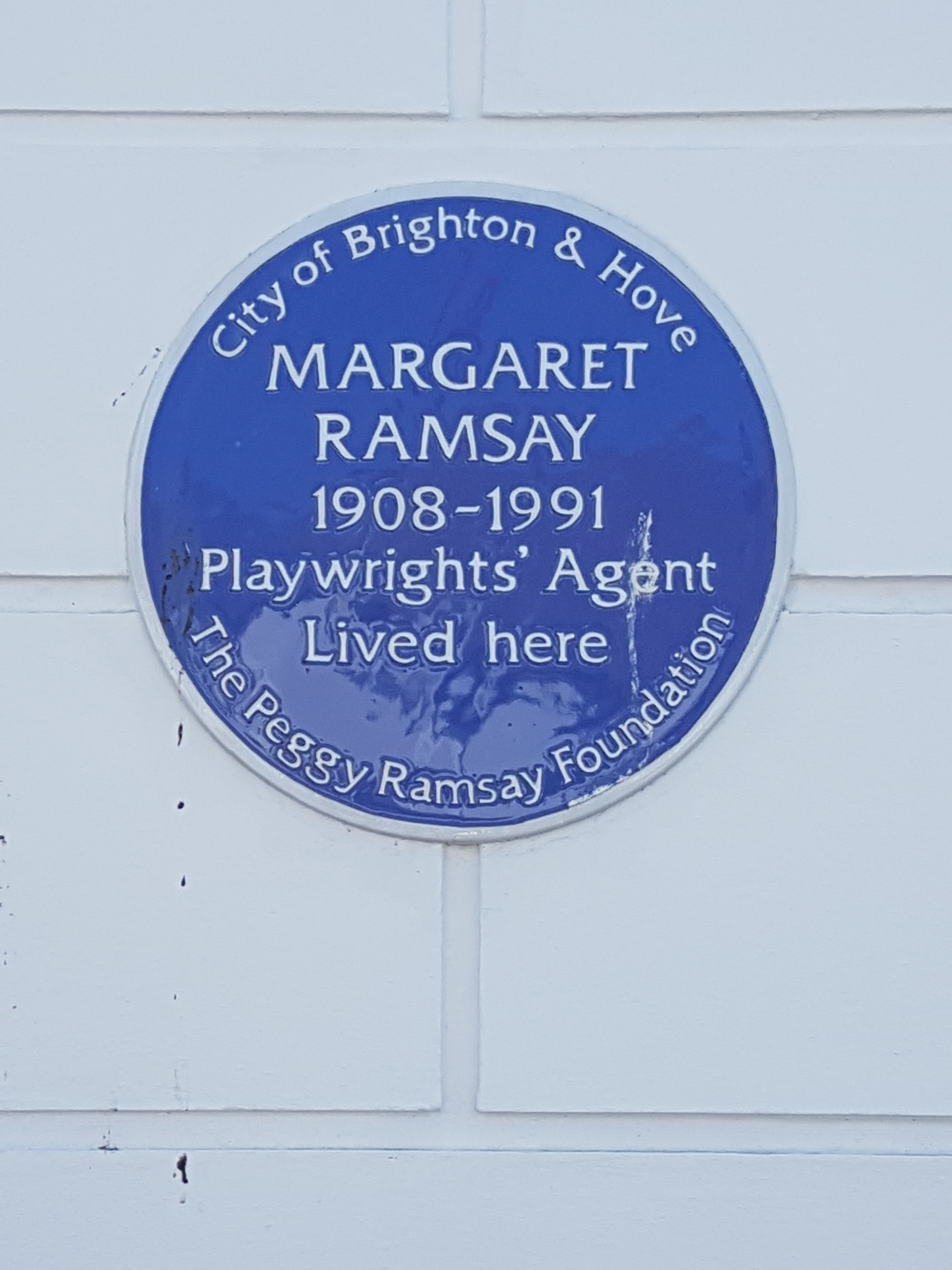
Margaret Ramsay – Blue Plaque

== Portrayals and books ==
In Prick Up Your Ears (1987), the Orton film biopic based on the Lahr book, Ramsay is portrayed by Vanessa Redgrave, while in Peggy For You (1999), a play by Alan Plater set in the late 1960s, Ramsay is placed centre stage. Two books have been written about Ramsay; Peggy: The Life of Margaret Ramsay, Play Agent (1997) by Colin Chambers a biography, and Simon Callow's memoir Love Is Where It Falls: The Story of a Passionate Friendship (1999), an account of their friendship. Peggy to her Playwrights: The Letters of Margaret Ramsay, Play Agent, a collection of her letters edited by Colin Chambers, was published in 2018.

From December 2021 to January 2022 Tamsin Greig played Ramsay in a revival of Plater's Peggy For You, directed by Richard Wilson at the Hampstead Theatre.
