= Algerian literature =

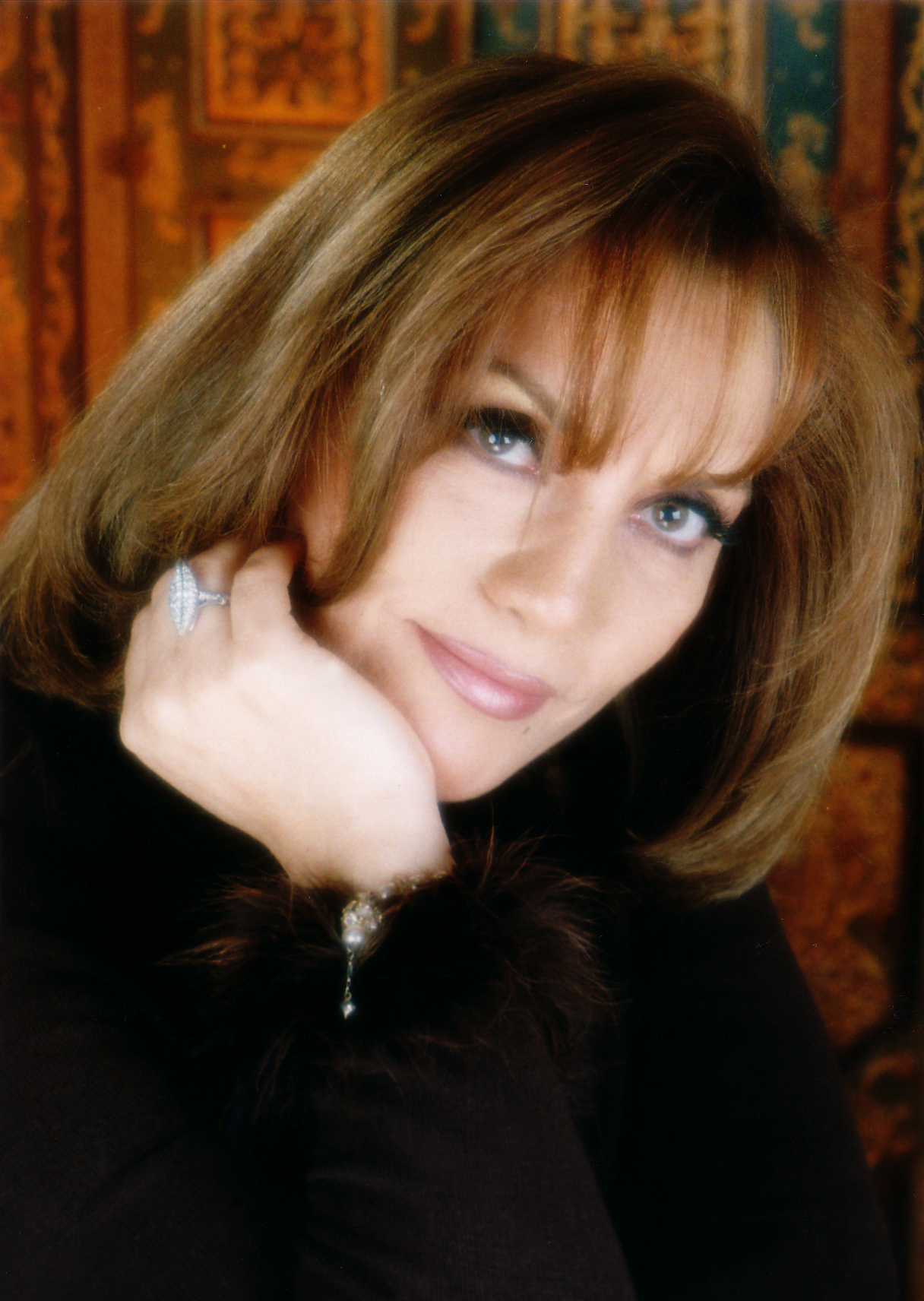
Ahlam Mosteghanemi, the most widely read woman writer in the Arab world, here in 2000.

Algerian literature has been influenced by many cultures, including the ancient Romans, Arabs, French, Spanish, and Berbers. The dominant languages in Algerian literature are French and Arabic.

Modern notable Algerian writers include Kateb Yacine, Rachid Mimouni, Mouloud Mammeri, Mouloud Feraoun, Assia Djebar and Mohammed Dib.

Since 1956, more than 100 novels, memoirs and poetry collections authored have been translated into English.

== History ==
The historical roots of Algerian literature trace back to the Numidian era, when Apuleius wrote The Golden Ass, the only Latin novel to survive in its entirety. Augustine of Hippo, Nonius Marcellus and Martianus Capella, among others, also wrote in this period. The Middle Ages also saw many Arabic writers revolutionize the Arab world literature with authors like Ahmad al-Buni and Ibn Manzur and Ibn Khaldoun, who wrote the Muqaddimah while staying in Algeria. During the rule of the Ottoman Empire, Algerian literature remained in Arabic, mainly in the style of short stories and poetry. In the 19th century, with the beginning of French colonialism, most Algerian literature transition into French, and few Arabic works were written until post-independence in 1962.

== Literature in French ==
French literature in Algeria can be grouped into three main periods: first, assimilation from the beginning of the colonial period to 1945; second, decolonization from 1945 to 1962; and third, social critique from 1962 to present.

=== Up to 1945 ===
Because of the colonial regime, this literature appears at first to be in support of the French colonial regime, but they still explored themes about the difficulty of assimilation into French culture and the rifts between generations that these colonial changes caused. Some scholars continue to consider these works problematic in their acquiescence to French colonialism while other critics find a veiled critique of colonialism throughout these works in the form of allusions and double-entendre.

Algerianism was a literary genre with political overtones, born among French Algerian writers who hoped for a common Algerian future culture, uniting French settlers and native Algerians. The terme algérianiste was used for the first time in a 1911 novel by Robert Randau, "Les Algérianistes". A Cercle algérianiste was created in France in 1973 by Pieds-Noirs, with several local chapters. It has for "purpose to safeguard the cultural heritage born from the French presence in Algeria."

Many scholars consider M’Hamed Ben Rahal's La vengeance du cheikh (The Cheikh's Vengeance) in 1891 to be the first work of fiction in French by an Algerian author. Others notable works in the same period include Mustapha Allaoua's Le Faux talisman (The False Talisman) and Omar Samar's Ali, O mon frère (Ali, O My Brother) in 1893.

=== 1945–1962 ===
The second phase of Algerian francophone literature began as political tensions rose in the nation, and the War of Independence began. Most Algerian authors of this period were staunch supporters of the FLN and of an independent Algeria, so much so that many literary figures at the time were active participants in the independence struggle. Countless such writers, including Kateb Yacine, Mohamed Boudia, Anna Gréki, and Leila Djabali, were arrested and imprisoned by the colonial regime during the 1950s. In contrast with their pre-1945 counterparts, these writers were more vocally critical of France in their work and used a realistic style to highlight the injustices of colonialism. Notable works from this period include Feraoun's Le Fils du pauvre (The Poor Man's Son), Mohammed Dib's La Grande maison (The Big House), Mouloud Mammeri's La Colline oubliée (The Forgotten Hill), Kateb Yacine's Ndjema, and Malek Haddad's La Dernière impression (The Last Impression).

Albert Camus, a French-Algerian (or pied noir), is the best-known French writer to come from Algeria. A philosopher, novelist, and playwright, Camus won the Nobel Prize for Literature in 1957. While most of his stories are set in Algeria and he supported civil rights for the indigenous Algerians, he opposed Algerian independence, which has hurt his homeland.

=== 1962–Present ===
The third period of Algerian Francophone literature includes writing about the War of Independence, but also critiquing elements of Algerian tradition. These works focus on issues of urbanism, bureaucracy, religious intolerance and patriarchy. Similar to their varied topics, these works vary in style from Realism, to Postmodernism. These authors include Rachid Boudjedra, Rachid Mimouni, Leila Sebbar, Tahar Djaout and Tahir Wattar. Leila Sebbar's Shérazade, Shérazade, 17 ans, brune, frisée, les yeux verts trilogy explored the point of view of a second generation Algerian. It tackled new social and cultural situations such as the difficult reconstruction of identity in a country torn apart by its history. As Karina Eileraas puts it in "Reframing the Colonial Gaze: Photography, Ownership, and Feminist Resistance": Sherazade is a victim of her "persistent inability to access the past" which "traumatizes her life as a Maghrebian immigrant in France, and precludes successful mourning". Leila Sebbar's book explores the subject of identity and cultural hybridity with the use of intertextual and artistic references. In her book, Sherazade is able to mourn her lost homeland through the photographs of the French photographer Marc Garanger. As Karina Eileraas develops, his photographs "equip Sherazade with a supplemental shortcut to the past, the allow her to temporarily mourn her (lack of) Algeria".

Current Algerian literature can be loosely divided into two groups. The first group is strongly influenced by terrorism that occurred in the 1990s. The second group focuses on an individualistic conception of human adventure. Recent notable works include Swallows of Kabul and The Attack by Yasmina Khadra, Memory in the Flesh (originally in Arabic) by Ahlam Mosteghanemi and Nowhere In My Father's House by Assia Djebar.

== Literature in Arabic ==
=== Poetry ===
The earliest Algerian literature written in Arabic consisted of poetry in classical or semi-classical Arabic dating back to the 8th century. After the initial wave of Arabic works created during the first arrival of Arabic speaking people from the Middle East in the Maghreb, classical Arabic poetry in Algeria hit a lull stretching from 1492 to the 1920s. However, this time saw a flourishing body of poetry written in Algerian Arabic with a semi-classical form. The classical Arabic poetry that resurfaced in the 20s, 30s, and 40s mainly focused on religious values and were written in a classic style. A good example of this classic style is Mohamed Saïd El-Zahiri's “Greeting of the Oulémas.” This excerpt shows the characteristic religious themes:

Numerous were the brotherhoods, each
obeying its sheikh in everything he declared.
If he pretended to be holy, they acquiesced,
and, if he claimed divinity, they cried: prince of the inspired!...

During the War of Independence, most of the Arabic poetry in Algeria was written in Free verse. This poetry was both emotional and combative, akin to Romanticism. Post-independence poetry became more innovative in style, and focused on a broader range of topics, much like its prose counterpart. This type of poetry, with varied themes and structures, can be exemplified by an excerpt from Mabrouka Boussaha's “I Stay Awake”:

The candle has faded
So much so that I don't see anything
Burdened by the night,
While it was still young
It melted…

=== The Novel ===
Since Arabic was not taught or allowed in schools before the Algerian War, Algerian literature in Arabic before 1962 was sparse and mainly in short story format. Ahmed Reda Houhou wrote several acclaimed short stories in this period including his famous satire: In the Company of the Wise Man's Donkey. In fact, until 1971, with the publishing of Abdelhamid ben Hadouga's The South Wind, most Algerian Arabic literature was in short story format. Other notable works at this time include Tahar Ouettar's Laz (the Ace) in 1974 and A-Zilzel (The Earthquake) in 1976. The early 1970s Arabic novels focused primarily on the War for Independence and the transformation of Algerian society. By the 1980s, however, the themes of Algerian Arabic literature were largely similar to their French counterparts, discussing bureaucracy, religious intolerance and patriarchy. Moving into the 1990s, Algerian Arabic literature focused mainly on terrorism and the tragedy of what was called the Black Decade.

== Oral Literature ==
=== Berber Oral Poetry ===
Traditional oral literature in Berber languages such as Kabyle and Tamasheq existed since ancient times when the majority of the population was illiterate. This literature mainly included poems, called Asefru in Kabyle Berber. These poems were used for literary descriptions of both religious and secular life. The religious poems included devotions, prophetic stories, and poems honoring saints. The secular poetry could be about celebrations like births and weddings as well as accounts of heroic warriors. These poems were often performed by traveling poets called Imaddahen Below is a short excerpt of a translated asefru poem showing religious themes:

To whom should I complain?
I have become insane…
Lord, I implore your help...

This would be the first of three stanzas in the poem, each with three lines in an AAB AAB AAB rhyme pattern.

=== Women's oral poetry (Būqālah) ===
Būqālah designates at one and the same time a material ceramic object as well as the immateriality of ritually performed poetry embedded in the traditional divinatory pastime of Algerian women. Būqālah (also spelled bouqala, boukala, bogala and in the plural as bwagel, bawāqal, boukalates), can date back its emergence to the Ottoman Empire and the French occupation, with the ritual of Būqālah being most prevalent in the Algerian cities of Algiers, Cherchell, Blida, Tlemcen, Biskra and Constantine. The real driving forces behind its emergence as a ritual was pressured by the two colonial periods of Algerian history as Algerian women's anxieties, conjoined with their fears, sorrow missing and willingness to foresee the future, led to Algerian women to find a way to quench the doubts that have long been growing into demons during both periods of Algerian colonisation. These were the main driving forces behind the birth of this somewhat, "divinatory" game. Given this context, this form of oral dialectal poetry falls under the first form of feminine literature in Africa. Yet, even though it has the privilege of being the first form of feminine literature to emerge from the African continent, this form of literature was quite underestimated at the beginning because of chiefly, the language policies implemented during the Ottoman and French colonial eras, with one prioritising Classical Arabic over Algerian Arabic and, obviously, the French prioritising the French language. Moreover, orality leads this form of art and therefore it is more susceptible to decay because of Algerian women's illiteracy at the time, with the French government at the time stating, "spoken words vanish, written words remain".

Origins of Būqālah draws its roots from psychological issues. For example, a lot of women had to stay months without any contact with their husbands who either had to leave to work or to join the revolutionary movement. However, the concerns varied from women to women, and all of them shared a common's women trait which is to foresee the future. Given this credence, despite women's illiteracy at the time, many of them seemed gifted enough to come out with poetic verses that touched various themes such as love, work, travelling, social status, state of mind, aspirations, hopes, wishes, incoming dangers, news, reunions, break ups etc.

=== French colonial-era collections ===
The French colonial era contributed to the creation of texts that transmitted spoken Algerian Arabic either in Arabic script modified or the dialect or Latin alphabet transcriptions. These translation and dialect tend to focus or structural, metrical and content matters internal to the text. In retrospect, little is provided about topics relevant to contemporary folklorists, literacy critics and anthropologists. For example, who were and are the women storytellers and poets, and what is known about oral culture that produced these texts. There is, when looking at the wider literature as a whole, very little known about Būqālah artists during the colonial times and the ritual itself is still, to some extent, difficult to understand and shrouded in Algerian feminine secrecy. However, despite minimal biographical knowledge about individual women poets, nonetheless, colonial-era ethnographers and administrators, who were steeped in cultural and ideological justifications for the French mission "civilisatrice", remained entranced by Algerian women's rites and superstitions and the attendant possibilities for gaining access to females worlds through folklore traditions.

One of the earliest descriptions of the ritual in French that included Būgālah poems transcribed from Algerian Arabic appeared in 1913 by Joseph Desparmet. Even as academic practices in colonial Algeria were shifting toward literacy Arabic and away from the dialect, Desparmet focus on Algerian Arabic oral poetry and folklore relegated his academic status in French Algeria. However, it is important to consider here about the inherent bias that colonial officers had when translating Algerian Arabic folklore tales to both written Arabic and French. Although collectors may have given pride of place to their use of oral sources direct from the mouth of the "native", at the same time they effectively elided creative female interlocutors, thereby rendering them unknown, and hence muted. Many folklore-collectors trained in their home countries in Europe would export to their colonies a bias towards the written against the oral in general, and consequently in Algeria, there was an orientalist tendency to set literacy Arabic in opposition to Algerian dialect in their research. When the poet-creators were female, as with Būgālah rituals and recitations, a devolutionary reading would assume that women orally recite their poetry because they are yet too uncivilised to write down their words. In other words, female orality is its own devolutionary proof.

=== Post-Independence Algeria ===
Fifty years after Desparmet labelled Algerian Arabic the linguistic medium that assuages the colonised, a similar sentiment is articulated by Sarah, the protagonist in novelist Assia Djebar's 1980 novel Women of Algiers in Their Apartment. Djebar's fictional heroine is a researcher of women's oral literature who notes Algeria's post-independence "return to folklore" because "folklore, this preserved within the family, reassures us". Similarly, written in the same decade after independence, psychologists Noureddine Toualbi revived Desparmet's analysis in order to valorise historically the roles of feminine rites and linguistic and cultural bulwarks against acculturation to the ongoing French civilising mission, nothing less than a form of resistance to the changes imposed by French colonial administrators. Beyond therapeutic, consulatory and sentimental emotions attributed to Būqālah, trends in research began to document the increasing deployment of oral literature and performance in the service of Algerian independence. During Algeria's war of Independence (1954-62), French ethnologist Pierre Bourdieu tracked the rising potential consciousness to be found within innovative expression of oral literature and folk songs that possessed the same social clout and emotional power as a newspaper, heroic epic or historical account. It showed how the mere act of speaking Algerian Arabic as an expression of Algerian cultural resistance to the domination of France and the French language. This influence of Algerian folklore and poems was shown in 1974-75 and again in 1983, where the government of Algeria ran radio broadcasts on popular Wednesday evening programs devoted to Būqālah poems. Listener participation was passionate - the radio station was deluged with poems mailed in or phoned in.

=== Algeria women's poetry as cultural resistance ===
During the Algerian liberation war from France, the Būqālah poem and rite, always oral and in Algerian Arabic, included males, although genuine poetic improvisations were deemed for the purview of females. The Algerian war has cut into leisure activity - male and female urban dwellers disappeared into the resistance or the countryside, while constant French curfews and night patrols eliminated the safe routines of urban evening gatherings. Despite population lockdowns, Būqālah poems were still recited in wartime Algeria from the 1950s, but emphasis shifted from predicting a man's love to divinity, the safety of resistance fighters and the beloved whereabouts in the army of resistance. A feminine gave once linked to orality, occult arts and poeisis began to bear new political burdens. In similar ways cross-culturally and historically, numerous national movements appropriated and transfigured vernacular authenticity when repurposing folk songs and folk poetry into the service of nationalist, revolutionary agendas and ideals.

Folklore scholar Regina Bendix called the continuing importance of folklore in the search for cultural and linguistic authenticity "an emotional and moral quest":

"Folklore has long served as a vehicle in the search for the authentic, satisfying a longing for an escape from modernity. The ideal folk community, envisioned as pure and free from civilization's evils, was a metaphor for everything that was not modern. Equally relevant is folklore's linkage to politics, where authenticity bestows a legitimating sheen, with political change linked to modernity, affirmatively in revolutions, negatively in counterrevolutions. The most powerful modern political movement, nationalism, builds on the essentialist notions inherent in authenticity, and folklore in the guise of native cultural discovery and rediscovery has continually served nationalist movements since the Romantic era."

Texts derived from the performed expressive culture of the Būqālah that inextricably linked Algerian women, the Algerian Arabic dialect, poets and women's sexuality underwent a process of transformation into symbols of national resistance and unity.

Scholar and professor of Arabic Amin Bamia, who lived in Algeria and taught Algerian folklore at the University of Constantine in the early 1970s, recalls the first, albeit short-lived national campaign spearheaded by the Ministry of Culture, then headed by Ahmed Taleb Ibrahimi. The belief of the campaign was a "cultural decolonisation" for Algeria was needed, and projects to collect and preserve classic genres of folklore. For Ibrahimi, "national culture is preserved in proverbs, folk songs and all this oral literature that continues to reflect life and the struggles of the peoples".

=== The ritual of Būqālah and its poems ===
A summary of Būqālah rituals: begins with a ceremony of fumigation (fabkhirah). Several perfumes commingle in a brazier (kānin) accompanied by Būqālah recitations to invoke good spirits and ward off evil spirits. Audience attendees and the Būqālah pitcher pass through fumes of white and black gum benzoin, resins, aloe wood, coriander, incense and myrrh. The pitcher is filled with water and as the mistress of ceremonies recites a poetic invocation asking participants to deposit items in the Būqālah filled with water. Items that have been personally touched by her body will be placed in the pitcher. The audience, including young female assistance, are asked to think of a specific person and knot a belt, kerchief or handkerchief while they focus their thoughts on the absent desired beloved. The mistress of ceremonies recites a poem at the moment of invocation and knot tying.

To trigger poetic and divinatory outcomes, a hand is dipped in the Būqālah and randomly retrieves one of the immersed objects. Once the objects owner is identified, the time has come for poetic inspiration and interpretations on behalf of the ornaments wearer, who is apprised of the poem, its meaning and how it applies to her and the person in her thoughts.

Būqālah poems are famous for resorting to complex rhetorical, narrative flourishes in which playful exchanges between two lovers are voiced that set the scene for erotic encounter.

The following is an excerpt from a Būqālah poem used for the independence struggle that describes waiting for freedom:

My heart full of worries is like a brazier
where the half-burned logs each moment shoot off high flames
be also patient, O my heart, until the olive under the press
or the baby ostrich on whom the vulture pounces
or the dove captive in the cage who can watch
and is forbidden to go out…

== See also ==
- List of Algerian writers
- List of Algerian women writers
- Languages of Algeria
