= Chukri Khodja =

Algerian writer (1891–1967)

- شكري خوجة
- Born: Hassen Khodja Hamdane; February 11, 1891; Casbah of Algiers, Algeria
- Died: October 1969; Algeria
- Occupations: Writer, judicial interpreter, accountant
- Writing career
- Language: French, Arabic
- Period: 20th century
- Genre: Novel
- Notable works: Mamoun, l'ébauche d'un idéal El-Euldj, captif des Barbaresques
- Movement: Algerian French-language literature

Chukri Khodja (in Arabic: شكري خوجة), pseudonym of Hassen Khodja Hamdane, born on 11 February 1891 in Algiers and died in 1967, was a French-speaking Algerian writer and author of two novels in the 1920s, often cited as one of the first Algerian novelists to write in French.

== Biography ==
Hassen Khodja Hamdane was born on 11 February 1891 in the Casbah of Algiers, into a family of small traders. He was educated in the colonial school system and also attended the madrasa. He published under the pseudonym Chukri Khodja. He died in 1967.

== Themes and critical reception ==
In the article A novelist of troubled identity and impossible assimilation, Abdelkader Djeghloul analyses how Khodja plays a double game of language and identity between French and Arabic, between assimilation and otherness. The study The Splitting of the Hero in El Euldj, Captif des Barbaresques by A. Amrouch examines the duality of the main character, his conversion, his alienation, and his tragic end. Other academic studies explore the question of assimilation and identity awareness in the writer.

== Honours and legacy ==
Khodja's novels have been republished, are studied at Algerian literature conferences, and feature in overviews of early French-language Algerian literature. Specialist bookshops advertise his rare and antique editions.

== Bibliography ==
=== Works by the autor ===
- 1928 : Khodja, Chukri, Mamoun, l'ébauche d'un idéal, Paris, Radot.
- 1929 : Khodja, Chukri, El-Euldj, captif des Barbaresques, Arras, Revue des Indépendants / I.N.S.A.P.

=== Studies and critical articles ===
- Abdelkader Djeghloul, Un romancier de l'identité perturbée – Chukri Khodja, REMMM, 1984[2]
- A. Amrouch, Le dédoublement du héros dans El Euldj, Captif des Barbaresques , Synergies Algérie n° 24 (2017)[3]
- MOHAND AKLI, R. Identity Construction in Chukri Khodja's El Euldj, Captif des Barbaresques, الممارسات اللغوية, vol. 6, no 2, 2015, p. 15-26
- AMROUCH, Afaf. Le dédoublement du héros dans El-Euldj, Captif des Barbaresques de Chukri Khodja, Synergies Algérie, no 24, 2017, p. 59-68
- AMROUCH, Afaf. La pratique du français dans El-Euldj, Captif des Barbaresques de Chukri Khodja, Al Athar, n° 26, Kasdi Merbah Ouargla university, 2016
- ALLOUACH, Ferroudja. Histoire et mémoire coloniale : (im)possible partage ? Relecture de Zohra, la femme du mineur de Hadj Hamou et Mamoun, l'ébauche d'un idéal de Chukri Khodja, Revue algérienne des lettres, vol. 4, no 1, 2020
- HANOU, Saïd. Figures de l'altérité dans El-Euldj, Captif des Barbaresques de Chukri Khodja,Tissemsilt university, 2022.
