= South wind (disambiguation) =

The south wind is the wind that originates from the south and blows north.

South Wind may also refer to:

- South Wind (film), 2018 Serbian film
- South Wind (TV series), 2020 Serbian TV series
- South Wind 2: Speed Up, 2021 Serbian film
- South Wind 2: Speed Up (TV series), 2022 Serbian TV series
- Južni Vetar: Na Granici, 2023 Serbian TV series
- South Wind (novel), by Norman Douglas
- South Wind (train), which operated between the U.S. city of Chicago and the state of Florida from 1940 to 1971
- The South Wind (novel), a novel by Abdelhamid ben Hadouga
- "The South Wind", a song from the album Yoko Ono/Plastic Ono Band

== See also ==
- Južni Vetar (disambiguation) (Serbian for "South Wind")
- Southwind Drum and Bugle Corps, a Drum Corps International Open Class (formerly Division II/III) corps from Mobile, Alabama
- Southwind Airlines, Turkish airline
