= Guillermo Carnero Hoke =

Peruvian writer, political revolutionary and activist (1917-85)

Guillermo Carnero Hoke (Note: Sometimes spelled Hocke) (June 17, 1917 – March 31, 1985) was a Peruvian writer and political revolutionary, and an activist for the Indigenous peoples in Peru.

== Early life ==
Carnero Hocke was born in Piura, Peru, on June 17, 1917, to a Peruvian father and an Irish mother. He grew up in Talara, where he joined the American Popular Revolutionary Alliance (APRA) in 1931 at the age of 14. In 1933 he travelled to Lima and joined the Communist Youth. He remained a communist until 1939, when he re-joined APRA.

== Early activism and first exile ==
From 1944–1947, he was a member of a student group affiliated with APRA called The Poets of the People (Spanish: Los Poetas Del Pueblo). Other members included his brother-in-law Gustavo Valcárcel, Eduardo Jibaja, Julio Garrido Malaver, Mario Florian, Felipe Arias-Larreta, Abraham Arias-Larreta, Luis Carnero Checa, Antenor Samaniego, Ricardo Tello Neira, Juan Gonzalo Rose, Manuel Scorza, Alberto Valencia and Felipe Neira. During this time, he published two poetry books, Epopeya to Atahualpa (1944) and Agrocantos (1945).

After a failed uprising against President José Bustamante y Rivero during October 1948, Carnero Hoke was disciplined and then removed from APRA for criticizing the party.

Between 1950 and 1955, Carnero Hoke lived outside Peru, first in Guatemala, and later in Mexico. While in Mexico, he helped plan an armed insurrection of Peru that ultimately failed when the group was captured upon returning to Peru. He and his companions were imprisoned and tortured. During this period, he became disillusioned with APRA, as APRA politicians had sided with the state against the revolutionary current.

== Peruvian Revolutionary Nationalist Party ==
Upon his release from prison in 1957, Carnero Hoke founded the Peruvian Revolutionary Nationalist Party (Spanish: Partido Nacionalista Revolucionario Peruano) with several other ex-APRA members. The new party declared itself to be "anti-imperialist, anti-feudal and anti-oligarchical".

The Peruvian Revolutionary Nationalist Party (PRNP) was based in Lima. The PRNP Organizing Committee was initially composed of Carnero Hoke as general secretary, Alberto Bolognesi as Deputy General Secretary, Victor Ortiz Rodriguez (Political Secretary), Carmelo Salvatierra and Francisco Martínez Arbalza (Interior Secretaries), Carlos Jiménez and Héctor Carcovich (Secretaries for Economy), Rogger Mercado (Press Secretary), Asuntos Indígenas, José Castro Guillén (Labour and Indigenous Affairs Secretary), Lino Pedro Pastrana and Oscar Calderón (Propaganda Secretaries), María Salazar Moscoso and Hebé Heredia C (Women's Affairs Secretaries), Ernesto Elias (Secretary for Discipline), José Dodero (Secretary for Conjunctions), German F Minaya (Secretary for Peasantry) and Luis Fernando Diaz (Secretary for Organization). The PNRP organized a revolutionary current within the Peruvian armed forces and sought to build a 'free territory for the Indians".

== Later life and second exile ==
In 1960 Carnero Hoke returned to exile in Mexico, where he founded the Latin American Liberation Movement (MLL) with other Latin American prospective revolutionaries. In 1966, he published La Madrastra Europa: Tesis para la liberación de América Latina ("La Madrastra Europa: Thesis for the release of Latin America"), a book outlining the ideology of the MLL. In 1967 he published El método revolucionario y la conciencia histórica ("The Revolutionary Method and Historical Consciousness"), a compilation of articles supporting the previous work.

In 1968, Carnero Hoke returned to Peru from exile in Mexico and published Nueva teoría para la insurgencia ("New Theory for the Insurgency"). On December 23, 1968 the PNRP National Council declared the party dissolved.

In 1974 Carnero Hoke founded the Peruvian Indian Movement (MIP) with another indigenous activist, Virgilio Roel Pineda, but the organization never reached a broad audience.

== Illness and death ==
Carnero Hoke had the first in a series of strokes in 1976, resulting in a month's hospitalization. He survived a second, but his third caused a cerebral infarction that resulted in his death on March 31, 1985.
