= The God Beneath the Sea =

1970 novel by Leon Garfield

- Front cover of first edition
- Author: Leon Garfield; Edward Blishen
- Illustrator: Charles Keeping
- Cover artist: Keeping
- Language: English
- Genre: Children's novel, Greek myth
- Publisher: Longman
- Publication date: 26 October 1970
- Publication place: United Kingdom
- Media type: Print (hardcover & paperback)
- Pages: 168 pp (first edition)
- ISBN: 978-0-582-15093-5
- OCLC: 130582
- Dewey Decimal: 292/.1/3
- LC Class: PZ7.G17943 Go
- Followed by: The Golden Shadow

The God Beneath the Sea is a children's novel based on Greek mythology, written by Leon Garfield and Edward Blishen, illustrated by Charles Keeping, and published by Longman in 1970. It was awarded the annual Carnegie Medal (Garfield & Blishen) and commended for the companion Greenaway Medal (Keeping) (Note: Since 1995 there are usually eight books on the Greenaway shortlist. According to CCSU, some runners up through 2002 were Commended (from 1959) or Highly Commended (from 1974). There were 99 commendations of both kinds in 44 years, including Keeping and two others in 1970.) by the British Library Association. Pantheon Books published a U.S. edition with illustrations by Zevi Blum in 1971.

The novel begins with newborn Hephaestus (the titular god beneath the sea) cast from Mount Olympus by his mother Hera. He is raised in a grotto by Thetis and Eurynome and the two goddesses tell him various Greek creation myths. The novel continues with myths of the Olympians and the age of gods and mortals, and concludes with Hephaestus returning to Olympus, having been cast down for a second time after reproaching Zeus.

Garfield, Blishen, Keeping, and Longman collaborated on a sequel entitled The Golden Shadow (1973, ISBN 9780582151628). It is based on myths of the later heroic age, when divine activity was limited.

== Plot ==
The God Beneath the Sea is divided into three parts. Part one begins with the image of the infant Hephaestus plummeting from Olympus to the ocean. Thetis saves the baby and takes him to the grotto she shares with Eurynome. They raise the baby, telling him stories of Greek myths and giving him a hammer and anvil to play with. Part one concludes with Hermes inviting Hephaestus back to Olympus at Hera's bequest, and Hephaestus claiming Aphrodite for his wife. Part two tells the myths of Prometheus and Pandora, and part three tells various myths of gods interacting with mortals. The novel concludes with the Olympians unsuccessfully attempting to overthrow Zeus, and Hephaestus returning to Olympus from Lemnos, having been cast down from Olympus for a second time after reproaching Zeus.

=== Part I ===
In Part I, "The Making of the Gods", Thetis and Eurynome tell Hephaestus stories of the Titans and Olympians, in hopes of quelling his restless nature. They begin with the myths of the Titans emerging from Chaos, then tell of the birth of the Cyclopes and Hecatonchires, and the overthrowal of Uranus by his son Cronus. They tell of Cronus' ascension to the throne with his queen Rhea, and his descent to madness after the Furies torment him nightly with prophecies that he, like his father, would be overthrown by his son.

Hephaestus grows uglier and more violent with age. Thetis and Eurynome give him a hammer, anvil and forge to vent his fury and discover he is a gifted smith. Hephaestus' most beautiful creation is a brooch depicting a sea nymph and her lover; he threatens to destroy the brooch unless Thetis tells him who he is and how he came to live in the grotto. The goddesses resume their tales: Rhea and Zeus conspire to overthrow Cronus. The avenging children of Cronus defeat and imprison the Titans, sparing Rhea, Prometheus and Epimetheus.

The gods fashion their home on Olympus, and Zeus seduces Hera by transforming himself into a cuckoo. Their child is hideous and misshapen, and Hera throws the child out into the sky. At the revelation of his parentage, Hephaestus breaks the brooch, and half is washed to sea. His desire for vengeance are tempered by the realization of Zeus' immense power. The narrative then shifts from Hephaestus and the goddesses to recount concurrent events amongst the Olympians, including the arrival at Olympus of Apollo, Artemis, Athene and Hermes.

Pregnant again, Hera overlooks Zeus' infidelities, resolving to remain calm to avoid another monstrous child. Hera gives birth to her second son, Ares, and the immortals come to Olympus to honor the newborn god. Zeus commands Hermes to find a gift for Ares. Hermes finds the lost half of Hephaestus' broken brooch and returns it to Zeus as a gift. Zeus creates Aphrodite in the image of the brooch's nymph. Hermes then reunites the broken half of the brooch with the other half, which is worn by Thetis.

Hera, struck by the beauty of the brooch, demands to know who fashioned the brooch, then dispatches Hermes to fetch Hephaestus. Hermes returns Hephaestus to Olympus; Hephaestus forgives Hera and asks Zeus for Aphrodite as a wife. Ares demands a birthright from Zeus, and Zeus makes him god of hatred, discord and war.

=== Part II ===
In Part II, "The Making of Men", Prometheus makes men out of clay and the substance of Chaos to inhabit the earth, fearing that Zeus will give the earth to one of his children as a plaything. At Zeus' behest, Hermes commands Prometheus to destroy his creations. Instead, Prometheus teaches his creatures to sacrifice and worship Zeus. Prometheus offers Zeus the choice of two portions as sacrifice; Zeus mistakenly chooses the poorer portion, and in retribution forbids mankind the use of fire. Prometheus steals fire for them in defiance of Zeus. He continues to watch over mankind, finding strange impurities in the substance of Chaos he'd used to create them. These he scrapes away and hides in a sealed jar.

Zeus commands Hephaestus to make a woman. The Olympians bless her with gifts, and Zeus names her Pandora. Hermes gives Pandora to Epimetheus as a wife. Zeus punishes Prometheus by chaining him to a pillar in the Caucasus, where a vulture eats his liver daily. At night his wounds heal, so that his punishment can begin anew the next morning.

Pandora eventually finds Prometheus' hidden jar. Opening it, she releases malignant furies on mankind: madness, old age, vice and sickness. All that is left in the jar is a chrysalis that works as a healing balm. Hermes consoles the despairing Prometheus that hope was left behind for mankind, "for who knows what may unfold from a chrysalis?"

=== Part III ===
Part III, "Gods and Men", begins with the tale of Lycaon turned to a wolf by Zeus after treating him with disrespect. Zeus begins a deluge. Prometheus shouts a warning to Deucalion, who makes a sea vessel to survive the storm with his wife, Pyrrha. They land at Mount Parnassus, and after praying they repopulate the earth by casting stones over their shoulders. The stones transform to people when they land.

The novel then tells of Persephone's abduction by Hades, and Demeter's search for her. After learning of Persephone's abduction from a shepherd, Demeter swears to Zeus that she will withdraw her blessings from the earth unless Hades returns Persephone. Zeus agrees to let Persephone return if she has not tasted the food of the dead. Ascalaphus, a gardener in the underworld, remembers that Pandora ate seven pomegranate seeds in Hades, and Demeter turns him into a screech-owl. Rhea intercedes and Demeter agrees to let Persephone live with Hades for three months of the year.

The novel tells myths of Autolycus, the son of Hermes and Chione, and Sisyphus. Autolycus steals the cattle of his neighbor Sisyphus; Sisyphus gains revenge by raping Autolycus' daughter Anticleia. Autolycus sends Anticleia to Ithaca to marry Laertes, who raises Odysseus, the son of Sisyphus and Anticleia, as his own. Sisyphus spies Zeus ravishing the daughter of the river god Asopus and tells Asopus where he had seen them in return for a gift of an eternal spring. He tricks death by trapping Hades in his own manacles. Hades is freed by Ares, but Sisyphus escapes death a second time by deceiving Persephone. At last Hermes takes Sisyphus to Tartarus, to be condemned to roll a boulder up a hill for eternity.

Meanwhile, Hera and the Olympians conspire to imprison Zeus in a net while he is distracted raining thunderbolts on Asopus. Thetis fetches Briareus to free him. Zeus punishes Hera by hanging her in the sky, and sets Poseidon and Apollo the vain task of building the doomed city of Troy. Hephaestus, seeing Hera's punishment, berates Zeus, and Zeus throws Hephaestus for a second time from Olympus. Hephaestus lands on the isle of Lemnos and is nursed to health by the locals. He returns to Olympus and is greeted by Hermes. At the novel's conclusion, Autolycus muses in a letter to his daughter that his grandson Odysseus may one day visit the new city of Troy.

== Development and themes ==
Blishen and Garfield began work on The God Beneath the Sea after discovering that Greek mythology had had similar impacts on them as primary school children. In Blishen's words, "these stories seemed to illuminate, to make clear, what was going on around me in my small and unimportant life. They were about love ... They were about the desire for power, about jealousy, about triumph and great defeat." Garfield suggested they should "write the stories for today's children" and remove the "upholstered Victorian quality" of the stories as told to themselves.

The authors aimed to restore the power the myths had had for the Greeks, and for themselves as children. They decided to tell the myths not as separate stories but as "a fresh and original piece of fiction" and a single, continuous account of the origins of the world, of man's struggle against his surroundings, and of man's struggle with his own nature. They hoped while writing the book to present the myths as "a total coherent account of the human situation, the human predicament, and human opportunities." One of the main difficulties they encountered was selecting a sequence of myths from "the enormous expanse" of Greek mythology to form a single story that would increase the power of the work.

They shared a concern about recent developments in children's literature and society's attitudes towards children. They felt that older children's literature had been moving closer to adult literature, and that the book had taken them "further than [they'd] ever been taken before" towards that end. They felt it necessary to address "meaningful violence" and "the strongest of human passions" in the novel, because these were "the preoccupations with which our children are, we know, at the moment filled."

Blishen and Garfield used four source texts: E. V. Rieu's translations of the Iliad and the Odyssey, the Metamorphoses, and Robert Graves' The Greek Myths. The authors' primary source text was Graves' The Greek Myths, because of the simplicity of his writing. They also borrowed from Ovid and many musical sources, including Handel.

About the writing process the authors told Junior Bookshelf (August 1971), "We wrote together, much of the time. One of us would actually commit the words to paper. There were often long silences. These might be broken, not by a grave suggestion as to further text, but by some wild burst of laughter. Much of the matter we were dealing with was most grim and tense. Laughter – and some schoolboyish joking – helped."

=== Development of the illustrations ===
Charles Keeping drew fifteen illustrations for The God Beneath the Sea. His work was widely acclaimed by critics, but Keeping himself was dissatisfied with the illustrations. He was not enthusiastic about working on the book when approached by Garfield, as he disliked the Greek myths. The myths had been presented to him in school "in the most boring fashion" and as an art student he found Greek art "cold and dispassionate." He saw the customary method of illustrating Greek myths in a stylized mimicking of Greek vase painting as "an utter bore."

After Garfield told Keeping he was using Robert Graves as a source, Keeping read The Greek Myths and found them "quite disgusting" and "completely devoid of any love. This is all lust, rape, revenge and violence of every possible kind." Keeping looked for a deeper significance and philosophy in the stories, finding links to the Bible and other stories from other cultures and religions, and "some basic human passions." In attempting to "cover all the ground [Garfield and Blishen] covered with fifteen drawings", Keeping felt he had "to take a group of shapes that would project what this meant to me."

Keeping decided not to use Greek costume as he was concerned readers would react the same way he used to: "What does it mean? What does it do? Am I just delving into the past?" He also avoided modern dress as "this would be old fashioned within another fifteen years", deciding in the end to dispense with "any form of recognizable costume" while avoiding "anything that is appertaining to our particular moment in time." He used "a figurative art. There's nothing else in it... except people, their emotions and their reactions to emotions."

Keeping called his completed illustrations for The God Beneath the Sea "a set of drawings much to my disgust not all awfully good." He saw them as violent and cruel illustrations of violent and cruel people, and attempted to visually project this by taking "a symbolic line, so if you look at them you will find there's a symbolic overtone in them." At the time of the book's publication, Keeping was looking forward to working with the authors on the sequel The Golden Shadow, as he hoped "to redeem some of the mistakes of the first one."

== Literary significance and reception ==
The Library Association recognised The God Beneath The Sea for both of its annual children's book awards, the Carnegie Medal and the Kate Greenaway Medal. Garfield and Blishen won the Carnegie Medal, for the year's best children's book by a British subject. Keeping was a commended runner up for the companion Greenaway Medal, a distinction retired after 2002.

=== Writing ===
It was considered a controversial book at the time of its publication, with critical opinion divided on its merits. Reactions were particularly divided over the novel's prose style; John Rowe Townsend observed that "The authors were asking English prose to do something it has never been at ease with since the seventeenth century, and many reviewers thought that the Garfield-Blishen attempt at high flight ended like that of Icarus." Robert Nye felt the authors had "fallen into the trap of making everything impossibly vivid [...] thereby losing many of the subtleties that matter." Alan Garner in the New Statesman criticized the novel's prose as "overblown Victoriana, 'fine' writing at its worst, cliché-ridden to the point of satire, falsely poetic, groaning with imagery and, among such a grandiloquent mess, intrusively colloquial at times." Rosemary Manning wrote in the Times Literary Supplement that the writing is "lush, meandering and self-indulgent," and "larded with ... lazy adjectives ... and weighed down under laborious similes."

Positive reviewers saw the book's writing style as reinvigorating Greek myths for modern readers. History Today praised the book's "poetic writing" and "sense of the terror and mystery of the universe." A review in The Spectator called it "a remarkable book" that "should evoke a response from anyone clogged within the classics, wanting to see the poetry afresh." Ted Hughes reviewed the book positively, noting the authors' attempt to "crack the Victorian plaster" of "moralizing dullness... concentrated on the Ancient Greeks". For Hughes, the novel made the myths "vividly new"; the authors "stripped away the pseudo-classical draperies and produced an intense, highly coloured, primitive atmosphere." The Classical Journal stated the novel's chief strength was "a liveliness and vigor, of both style and action."

The novel's narrative structure was singled out by reviewers with similarly divided verdicts. For Manning, the novel's opening, "an excellent device ...to allow the book to start dramatically", and subsequent moments of pace and tension, are ruined by chronic over-writing. Nye felt the use of the two falls of Hephaestus as a framing device "makes sense of what comes in-between", but for Nye "it is a savage sort of sense, depending to a large extent on melodrama". History Today claimed the choice to retell the myths as a continuous narrative resulted in "a brilliant poetic fantasy"; Hughes said of the novel's series of stories, "[t]heir zest sweeps you along. It is a real feat, to make everything sound so first hand." Contemporary Review observed a "slight decline in narrative cohesiveness" in the second half of the book, after the "fine ... reworking of the earlier myths" but felt it "detracts little from the effectiveness of dramatic and narrative motifs ... which help tie together the disparate myths so well." The Spectator claimed "the narrative is handled with dramatic, and comic, awareness of the epic voyage into our creative origins."

Philip Pullman cites The God Beneath the Sea as an inspiration for his fantasy literature. A 2001 article in The Guardian named The God Beneath the Sea the ninth best children's book of all time, calling it "[v]isceral, overpowering, defiantly undomesticated" and "the best ever rendering of the Greek myths in modern English."

=== Illustrations ===
In contrast to the writing's mixed reception, critics were unanimous in acknowledging the power of Charles Keeping's illustrations. In an otherwise scathing review, Garner called them "a singular vision of what Classical myth must have been. Two drawings especially – Cronos and Prometheus – are more terrible and beautiful than Goya." Manning stated that Keeping's "contributions are magnificent... From this book, it is Keeping's interpretation of the 'enormous violent energy' of the Greek myths that will be remembered." The Spectator called the illustrations "totems of potency"; Contemporary Review said the "bold, forceful and imaginative illustrations" added to the "dramatic presentation of the myths." Hughes saw the illustrations as "relating the stories to the primitive roots of myth, rather than to the civilized commentators, taking the stories from scholarship and handing them back to imagination." Writing on the occasion of Keeping's nomination for the 1974 Hans Christian Andersen Award, a reviewer in The Times singled out the illustrations for The God Beneath the Sea and its sequel The Golden Shadow as "probably the most striking evidence of Keeping's forceful presence".

The U.S. publisher Random House replaced Keeping's work with illustrations by Zevi Blum. They were not well received by critics; one described them as "MGM-style drawings, which substituted for drama a soft coyness and prurience."

== Notes ==
Awards
Preceded by The Edge of the Cloud	Carnegie Medal recipient 1970	Succeeded by Josh
