= Lucky Sibiya =

South African artist (1942–1999)

Lucky Madlo Sibiya (24 December 1942 – 24 January 1999) was a South African artist known for his carved and painted wood panels, his woodcuts and his incised calabashes. Born in Vryheid, Natal, he grew up in Soweto and received guidance from Cecil Skotnes and Bill Ainslie. His Umabatha series of fifteen woodcuts, based on Welcome Msomi's play that set Shakespeare's Macbeth in Zulu history, was published by Gallery 21 in 1975.

Sibiya exhibited widely in South Africa and abroad, and his work is held in collections including the University of Pretoria Art Collection, the Constitutional Court Art Collection and the Oliewenhuis Art Museum. He died in a car accident in 1999, shortly before a planned exhibition at the Everard Read Gallery in Johannesburg, which became a memorial exhibition. Technical studies by Salomé Le Roux and Maggi Loubser have since examined the materials and techniques of his carved and painted works.

== Early life and schooling ==
Lucky Madlo Sibiya was born on 24 December 1942 in Vryheid, Natal, South Africa. At the age of eleven, he relocated to Sophiatown along with his family. Two years later, following the 1955 destruction of Sophiatown under Apartheid Urban Areas restrictions, the family moved to Soweto, a suburb of Johannesburg. His father was a sangoma whose traditional healing practices and use of ritual objects shaped Sibiya's early artistic sensibility. Sibiya grew up in Soweto before attending school in Hammanskraal, where he pursued art, focusing on woodcarving. He continued his education at St. Peter's Seminary, where he experimented with calabash engraving. Sibiya completed his schooling at St. Peter's Seminary seven years after he was sent to Hammanskraal. During this period, Sibiya introduced himself to Cecil Skotnes, and presented some of his painted 'found object' artworks. Skotnes was the head of Polly Street Art Centre in Johannesburg. He became a key mentor and friend to Sibiya.

== Training and mentors ==
Sibiya's early career focused on carving decorative elements onto gourds, calabashes, and lampshade bases. Steven Sack (1988) writes that Sibiya received guidance from Bill Ainslie and Cecil Skotnes. In 1974, Sibiya travelled to London, Paris and the United States. His works included in the South African art catalogue compiled by the Johannesburg Art Gallery featured Calabash (a decoratively incised gourd), The Lion's Prey (a 1985 diptych of woodcut panels), and Ostrich Egg (a painted ostrich egg inscribed with his monogram).

According to the Constitutional Court Art Collection, Sibiya became a private student of Cecil Skotnes, under whose guidance he developed his distinctive visual language.

According to Ogilvie and Graff, Sibiya was mainly self-taught despite receiving guidance from Skotnes and Bill Ainslie. While the University of Stirling Art Collection record does not mention Ainslie, it does state that Skotnes supported Sibiya once he had left school.

== Technique and materials ==
=== Found and Repurposed Materials ===
Sibiya frequently used existing wooden objects rather than relying on newly prepared boards. Documented conservation research indicates that his supports included furniture components, cupboard panels, and chair legs. The form of the original object remained largely recognisable beneath his carved and painted surfaces.

For The Doorhandle (1987), he arranged six carved wooden chair legs vertically, joining them with two horizontal metal rods. A Family Group (1987), a two-panel work, was crafted on wooden boards likely repurposed from a small cupboard or bedside table, as traces of holes and joints remain visible. For The Sun Man (1995), Sibiya used a traditional West African bed as the support, featuring a carved and painted human figure on the front while leaving the reverse unpainted.

=== Carving and Incising ===
Sibiya's technique developed from shallow relief engraving towards carving into wooden objects and panels. He created incisions and worked the surrounding surfaces to build forms, grooves and patterned areas before applying colour, establishing composition through flowing lines and contrasts between raised and recessed areas.

Technical examination of three works identified chisel marks ranging from 2 mm to 10 mm in width: The Doorhandle displayed incisions consistent with a 3 mm chisel; A Family Group showed evidence of 2, 4 and 7 mm chisels; and The Sun Man exhibited marks made by 2, 4 and 10 mm chisels. Additionally, infrared imaging did not reveal preparatory drawings in the examined regions; this finding describes what the technique detected, not proof that Sibiya never planned his compositions.

=== Binders and Technical Conservation Findings ===
The chemical composition of Sibiya's painted surfaces has been investigated using various analytical techniques. Elements that were related to the pigment composition were analysed with XRF. For the paint layer and support, microscopy and UV or IR imaging were utilised. For the binding medium of the paint, Fourier-transform infrared spectroscopy (FTIR) was employed. In the 2020 dissertation, The Doorhandle, A Family Group and The Sun Man were analysed by means of these techniques.

The publications are inconsistent with regard to the binding medium. Le Roux's 2020 dissertation identified acrylic-based binders across all three works of art. Likewise, the 2021 paper by Loubser and Le Roux described The Sun Man as an acrylic painting. However, a 2024 symposium abstract by the researchers reported oil as the binding medium in all three works.

The 2024 study also identified potential fillers and texturing agents, including chalk and gypsum, and reported that no surface varnish was present across the examined works. Recording these materials and methods will assist in gathering evidence that is necessary for their future conservation.

=== Pigments and Colour Application ===
Published descriptions of Sibiya's colour palette highlight the use of red, amber, blue, and brown tones, complemented by black passages and smaller accents of green or white, with contrasts between dark and vibrant areas serving as a key compositional element.

Microscopic examination of The Sun Man (1995) showed complex paint layering applied next to exposed wood, such as light blue underlayers beneath areas of dark blue and black paint.

Researchers used X-ray fluorescence (XRF) to investigate the elemental compositions of the painted areas and infer possible pigments that were used. For The Sun Man (1995) colourants like cadmium reds, titanium white, ochre and sienna may have been used. The findings of the XRF are interpretations rather than definitive identifications of each paint layer. The examination also documented brush and roller marks alongside texture materials that could be associated with chalk or gypsum. The 2024 research abstract reports usage of brushes, rollers and sponges used across all three works that were studied.

== Printmaking and uMabatha ==
In 1970, Welcome Msomi produced a play titled 'uMabatha'. This play depicts real events in Zulu history, features Kings Shaka and Dingane, and is structured around the plot of William Shakespeare's 'Macbeth'. Inspired by Msomi's work, Sibiya created 15 colourful woodcut prints showcasing scenes from the narrative in 1975. While some sources refer to Sibiya's Umabatha as a portfolio of woodcuts, others describe it as illustrations for Msomi's play. The 15 woodcuts include: 'Sangomas welcoming Mabatha', 'Dingane's fight', 'Sangoma's confrontation', 'The drums', 'Mabatha agrees to kill Dingane', 'Mabatha and the Sangomas', 'The assassination', 'The nation mourns', 'Mabatha is king', 'The feasting at Mabatha's kraal', 'The ghosts of Bhangane', 'The destruction of Mafudu's kraal', 'The impis', 'The death of Kamandonsela', 'The death of Mabatha'. Sibiya created the woodcuts using a layering technique, printing multiple times on the same surface to achieve the desired visual effect. In 1975, Gallery 21 published the uMabatha portfolio; the technical aspects of the portfolio's publishing and editions include 10 artist's proofs, several trial proofs, and an ordinary edition numbered 1 through 225 hand-printed by G. Mathies. Using the series' original woodblocks, Mathies printed the impressions under Sibiya's supervision. Of the ordinary edition listed from 1 to 225, only 210 were completed and bound into full portfolios. In 2006, the Umabatha series was donated by the Haenggi Foundation to the Oliewenhuis Art Museum; the portfolio was previously part of the PELMAMA Permanent Art Collection.

== Exhibitions ==
=== Solo Exhibitions ===
Sibiya's first ever solo exhibition was held at Gallery 101 (1971) in Johannesburg, South Africa. The exhibition featured Sibiya's signature carved and painted wood panels, a technique he was taught by his mentor Cecil Skotnes who introduced him to larger wood panels. His debut artworks were softly coloured, carved and painted wood panels depicting birds and horses.

In 1974 Sibiya held solo exhibitions at the Natal Society of Arts Gallery in Durban and at Gallery 21 in Johannesburg, as well as his first solo exhibition outside South Africa, in Manzini, Swaziland.

In 1976 he held a solo exhibition at the Ceolfrith Arts Centre in Sunderland, United Kingdom. The exhibition showed his Umabatha works, inspired by Welcome Msomi's play, which combined African traditions with Shakespeare's Macbeth. Sibiya showed 15 works, prints and wood carvings, depicting a series of cultural and ritual events.

=== The Neglected Tradition ===
The exhibition The Neglected Tradition: Towards a New History of South African Art (1930–1988), curated by Steven Sack, was presented at the Johannesburg Art Gallery from 23 November 1988 to 8 January 1989. The exhibition sought to address the limited recognition and documentation of Black South African artists within the country's established art history. Sack's research involved consulting artists, educators and community organisations, reflecting the need to investigate artistic histories that had not been adequately recorded. The accompanying catalogue became an important source of biographical and historical information about the artists included in the exhibition.

Sibiya was among the artists included in the exhibition and its catalogue.

=== Selected Group Exhibitions ===
Throughout the course of Lucky Sibiya's career his work has been displayed in multiple exhibitions both locally and internationally. These group exhibitions were held throughout South Africa and in Swaziland, the UK, Australia, Botswana, France, West Germany and the USA. In these exhibitions his abstract paintings and sculptural carvings would be shown on display.

His first group exhibition was at the NICRO Art Dealer's Fair in Milner Park, Johannesburg in 1971. He went on to build his reputation by displaying his work at other exhibitions such as Gallery 21 in 1973 where he exhibited his first silkscreens in his career. His early works in the early 1970s were referred to as 1.5 m by 1 m panels that were "softly coloured" that would often feature stylised birds or horses. These panels would be some of his artworks that would be on display in these group exhibitions.

He later was invited to participate in the "The Neglected Tradition" exhibition held at the Johannesburg Art Gallery in 1988-89 as well as "Historical Perspective of Black Art in South Africa 1930-1986", Alliance Française, Pretoria. In April 1996 his work was included in "South Africa's finest painters" at the Everard Read Gallery. His last group exhibition that he would participate in before his death on 24 January 1999 was in 1998 at the Durban Art Gallery.

=== Exhibitions Since Death ===
A memorial exhibition was held at the Everard Read Gallery in Johannesburg in 1999. This exhibition was originally planned before Sibiya's death for February of 1999, but became a memorial exhibition to honour Sibiya after his death.

Sibiya's work was also included in two exhibitions in the Bridge Gallery at the Javett-UP: Artology (April–August 2023) and Homage to Pretoria (16 May – 18 October 2024).

Artology is the study of art or objects as art. The exhibition presented Artology as a curatorial approach to researching and curating the University of Pretoria's collections. This exhibition included works from various artists, from some barely known to South Africa's most iconic, that reveal the complicated historical narratives that derive from collective and personal experiences of both the past and the present. It aims to rethink and reframe how university museums fill the narrative, identity and represent the gaps while examining institutional memory.

Homage to Pretoria featured a range of artists. The exhibition investigates the complicated and multifaceted histories of the city that are intertwined into the entire country. The exhibition showcases the narratives in the artworks that question the possibilities and difficulties that occur when paying homage to the city which has been a symbol of state control and repression for the many people of South Africa. The exhibition also aims to comment on the 30 years of democracy and how the city has changed and shaped the country overall, and vice versa.

== Public collections ==
The University of Pretoria Art Collection holds A Family Group (1987) by Lucky Sibiya, made of acrylic on carved wooden panels measuring 397 x 1590 mm. The diptych consists of two panels recorded as Family Group I and Family Group II, illustrating religious activities taking place within and around a domestic setting.

The Sun Man is a 1995 sculpture by Lucky Sibiya in the University of Pretoria Art Collection. The work consists of acrylic on a carved wooden bed from West Africa and measures 2855 x 545 x 70 mm. Sibiya described his vertical three-dimensional works as "totems" and drew on Zulu mythology for this piece.

The Bongi Dhlomo Collection holds Lucky Sibiya's works, such as Totem (1998), a sculpture made with carved wood; the measurement of the sculpture is 300 x 8 x 5 cm.

Thanda Bantu (1997), made of incised, painted panels and found objects, measures 187 x 228 x 20 cm.

Sangomas, created by Lucky Sibiya, is a woodcut print that is held at the Argyll Collection. Measuring 41 cm x 56 cm, the piece is from a limited edition of 225 prints. It is part of the Umabatha portfolio, a series inspired by Welcome Msomi's 1970 play Umabatha.

The Constitutional Court Art Collection holds Lucky Sibiya's artwork, including Ritual (CCAC# 0235), a colour woodcut on paper measuring 565 x 397 mm.

The Oliewenhuis Art Museum in Bloemfontein holds Motherhood (1981), an incised movuli wood panel, measuring 72 x 100 cm. Since 2001 it has been on loan to the University of the Witwatersrand Art Galleries in Johannesburg.

The Oliewenhuis Art Museum in Bloemfontein holds Lucky Sibiya's artwork "Harvesting" (1974) which is an incised wooden panel that is 90x106cm. It was donated by the University of Fort Hare Foundation as part of the original PELMAMA Permanent Art Collections.

The Oliewenhuis Art Museum in Bloemfontein has the UMABATHA portfolio A/P I/X which consists of 15 hand-printed woodcuts by Lucky Sibiya, this portfolio is part of the PELMAMA Permanent Art Collection. These 15 hand-printed woodcuts are made of paper, and each image is 57x40cm. These artworks were published by Gallery 21 in London and Johannesburg in 1975.

Sibiya's works are also held by other galleries and museums, including the Africana Museum in Johannesburg, the University of Fort Hare and the Arts Association Namibia Collection. The Doorhandle (1987), acrylic on carved wooden chair legs, is also in the University of Pretoria Art Collection.

== Death, recognition and recovery ==
John Peffer-Engels notes in his memoriam that despite Lucky Sibiya being a celebrity in South Africa and internationally, it was difficult for him to earn a living through his art until the late 1990s. Only a few years before his death, the demand for fairer gallery representation and the South African democratic transition increased his work's market value and volume.

By 1988, Lucky Sibiya’s work was held in public, corporate and private collections, which included the SABC, Sasol, the South African National Gallery and collections in Botswana, Germany and the United States.

Sack's catalogue included biographies of the artists whose works were showcased at his exhibition. Sack revealed that no previous attempt had been made to create a detailed biographical survey. The information that was gathered came from a wide range of sources, many of which contained inaccurate data. The biographies were described as the beginning of a creation of a new history of South African art. According to Sack, the biographies should be treated as a dynamic working document that allows for change to improve them and make them more accurate.

Lucky Sibiya died on 24 January 1999 in a car accident, two weeks before a major show at the Everard Read Gallery in Johannesburg. The exhibition became a memorial for his death.

Salome Le Roux and Maggi Loubser mentioned that 2019 marked the 20th anniversary of his death.

In 2024 they published a technical art study that was conducted on Sibiya's carved and wood-panel artworks, which are held in the University of Pretoria Art Collection. The study's purpose was to establish what materials he had used through provenance studies, visual examination, technical photography, X-ray fluorescence and Fourier-transform infrared spectroscopy. Le Roux and Loubser added that because Sibiya's works were already 20 years old, they needed conservation and restoration. They commented that the works should be cared for as they played an important role in conserving South African art heritage. The study found that Sibiya used materials such as found wooden objects, which included chair legs and wooden panels. This wood was used as support for his artworks.

Le Roux conducted a technical study on some of Lucky Sibiya's artworks in 2020, examining the techniques and materials that he used for his carved and painted wood panel works. One of Sibiya's artworks that Le Roux examined in this study was The Sun Man (1995) which is acrylic on carved West African wooden bed. One of the ways in which The Sun Man (1995) was examined closely to observe its details was through a USB digital microscope. Through observation and examination with a USB digital microscope, Le Roux found that Sibiya used a paint medium on The Sun Man (1995) that dried faster than other paint mediums such as oil paint.

According to the Constitutional Court Art Collection, Sibiya is recognised as a pioneering South African artist that joined traditional practices with modernist abstraction through his use of materials and practices. The Constitutional Court Art Collection further states that Sibiya is held in high regard due to the cultural symbolism and spiritual resonance that are present within his works. Today, his works are held in private, corporate and museum collections in South Africa and abroad. A 1984 article described the Umabatha series as one of his best-known works, noting his dynamic and fluid use of the woodcut and his setting of a Western subject, Shakespeare's Macbeth, in an African context. According to the Constitutional Court Art Collection, his legacy continues to endure in both his innovative and spiritually-driven works.
