= Charles Keeping =

English illustrator, children's book author and lithographer (1924– 1988)

- Charles Keeping
- Born: 22 September 1924; Lambeth, London, England
- Died: 16 May 1988 (aged 63); London, England
- Occupations: Illustrator, writer, lithographer
- Spouse: Renate Meyer
- Writing career
- Period: 1952–1988
- Genre: Children's literature
- Notable works: As illustrator: The God Beneath the Sea; The Highwayman; Beowulf
- Notable awards: Kate Greenaway Medal; 1967, 1981

Charles William James Keeping (22 September 1924 – 16 May 1988) was an English illustrator, children's book author and lithographer. He made the illustrations for Rosemary Sutcliff's historical novels for children, and he created more than twenty picture books. He also illustrated the complete works of Charles Dickens for the Folio Society.

Keeping won two Kate Greenaway Medals from the Library Association for the best children's book illustration of the year, for his own story Charley, Charlotte and the Golden Canary (1967) and for a new edition (1981) of Alfred Noyes's poem "The Highwayman". For the 50th anniversary of the Medal (1955–2005), a panel named his edition of The Highwayman one of the top ten winning works, which composed the ballot for a public election of the nation's favourite. He also illustrated The God Beneath the Sea, by Leon Garfield and Edward Blishen, which won the 1970 Carnegie Medal for children's literature. For his contribution as a children's illustrator Keeping was a runner-up for the Hans Christian Andersen Award in 1974.

Charles Keeping (1967) Charley, Charlotte and the Golden Canary

His lithographs have been exhibited in London, Italy, Austria and the U.S., including at the 1958 Fifth International Biennial of Contemporary Color Lithography in Cincinnati. He has prints in many collections, including at the Victoria and Albert Museum.

== Early life ==
Charles Keeping was born and grew up in Lambeth, London, in a terraced house that housed three generations. He lived in an inner city environment of street markets and working horses that would inform his work his entire life. Charles and his elder sister, Grace, drew and made up stories from an early age, on surplus newsstand placards brought home by their father, Charles Keeping senior, who distributed newspapers to shops and newsstands in the area and boxed under the name Charlie Clarke. He later described his upbringing as "comfortable working class".

He attended the Frank Bryant School for Boys in Kennington, south London, leaving at the minimum age of 14, after which two of his aunts paid for him to take a correspondence course in art. He took a job with the book printing company William Clowes & Sons, and after the outbreak of the Second World War joined Durrants, an engineering company producing munitions. He also spent some time working as a gasman. In 1942, when he turned 18, he joined the Royal Navy as a wireless operator, serving four years.

He returned to civilian life in 1946 with a profound depression and a belief that a head wound he had sustained had disfigured him on the inside as well as (temporarily) on the outside, and would cause him to turn evil like Dr Jekyll becoming Mr Hyde. He received treatment, was institutionalised for a time, and made a full recovery, but perhaps his sympathetic visual treatment of Grendel, the monster from Beowulf, owes something to this period of his life.

He applied for a grant to study art at the Regent Street Polytechnic, but was initially turned down, so he read meters for a gas company during the day and took art classes in the evening. He finally got his grant and studied full-time from 1949 to 1952, completing the two-year Intermediate Examination in six months before specialising in illustration and lithography. His teachers included illustrators Stuart Tresilian and Nigel Lambourne, and lithographer Henry Trivick. In 1957 his lithograph Clerks and Ponies was included as one of the 'Young Artists of Promise' in Jack Beddington's book. He also worked as a life model, and on one such occasion in 1949 his demonstration of the functions of the muscles of the back attracted the eye of Renate Meyer, a fellow student who had left Germany with her family in 1933. They married in 1952 and four children.

== Career ==
=== Early work ===
Keeping went freelance after graduation, and spent four years drawing a comic strip for the Daily Herald, but did not enjoy the editorial restrictions he had to work under. He also drew cartoons for the Jewish Chronicle, the Middle Eastern Review, and, later, Punch, and his first book commission was a series of cartoon illustrations for a humorous health-promotion book called Why Die of Heart Disease? in 1953. He also did some work in advertising, and illustrated some educational textbooks.

=== Children's books ===
Rosemary Sutcliff (1976), Blood Feud, book jacket by Keeping

In 1956 he began to work through the artist's agent B. L. Kearley Ltd, whose rep Patsy Lambe referred him to Mabel George, editor of children's books at Oxford University Press. George commissioned him to illustrate Rosemary Sutcliff's historical children's novel The Silver Branch. He was unenthused by the ancient Roman subject matter, but experimented with double page spreads and drawings in the margins, and was quickly assigned more books by Sutcliff and others, including Henry Treece. This began a professional relationship with Oxford University Press, for whom he illustrated more books than for any other publisher. Keeping, along with Victor Ambrus, established a new, exuberant style of illustration for children's historical fiction, refusing to shy away from the violence of warfare.

Leon Garfield and Edward Blishen's retelling of Greek myths, The God Beneath the Sea, which Keeping illustrated in 1970, won the Carnegie Medal for that year.

From the later 1960s Keeping, alongside illustrators like Brian Wildsmith and John Burningham, took advantage of advances in printing technology to move from black and white work to adventurous colour techniques. In 1966 he created his first full-colour picture books, Black Dolly and Sean and the Carthorse, both about mistreated working horses. He followed these with Charley, Charlotte and the Golden Canary, a modern fairy tale about two children who grow up in the same street, are separated when one family moves to a new tower block, and are reunited thanks to a pet canary, which depicts the gradual disappearance of the London of Keeping's childhood, a theme he would persistently revisit. The full-colour illustrations are messy and spontaneous, using intense colour, sponge texturing and wax resist, and won Keeping his first Greenaway Medal. Kirkus Reviews concluded a very short review, "Intense colors in striking combinations overwhelm the minimal story."

Keeping created 15 full-colour picture books for Oxford University Press, and several for other publishers. Joseph's Yard (1969) and Through the Window (1970), two of his finest, were also produced as short films for the BBC's "Storyline" programme. Through the Window in particular showcases many of Keeping's techniques and themes. Told through the eyes of a small boy watching events in the street outside from his bedroom window, the illustrations are full of intense evening light and colour, movement, and even, when a horse-drawn dray rattles across a double-page spread, virtual sound. Other picture books include Richard (1973), about a day in the life of a police horse; Wasteground Circus (1975), on the transient but magical effect on two young boys of the circus coming to town; and Willie's Fire Engine (1980), a romantic, dreamlike tale of a young Edinburgh boy's dream of being a firefighter.

In the 1980s Oxford University Press created a new format for Keeping - the black and white picture book for older children. Keeping created four books in this format: The Highwayman (1981), illustrating the 1906 poem by Alfred Noyes in gruesome detail, for which he won his second Greenaway Medal; Beowulf (1982), adapted from the Anglo-Saxon epic by Kevin Crossley-Holland, in which the illustrations subverted the text with a certain sympathy for the monster; The Wedding Ghost (1985), an original story by Leon Garfield; and The Lady of Shalott (1986), illustrating the 1833/1842 Arthurian poem by Alfred, Lord Tennyson. All were illustrated in evocative line and wash. The influence of Swedish illustrator John Bauer can most clearly be seen on Beowulf.

Keeping continued to produce colour picture books from time to time, including Railway Passage, which was Highly Commended for the 1974 Greenaway Medal; (Note: Today there are usually eight books on the Greenaway shortlist. According to CCSU, some runners up through 2002 were Commended (from 1959) or Highly Commended (from 1974). There were 31 high commendations in 29 years including Keeping alone in 1974. There were 99 commendations of both kinds in 44 years including two for 1969, three 1970, and two 1974. • No one has won three Greenaway Medals. Among the fourteen illustrators with two Medals, Keeping is one of seven with one book named to the Anniversary Top Ten (1955–2005); one of seven with at least one Highly Commended runner up (1974–2002); one of six with at least three commendations (1959–2002).) Sammy Streetsinger (1984), about a subway busker's rise to fame as a pop star and subsequent return to happy obscurity; and his final book, Adam and Paradise Island, another story of the changing landscape of London, which was published posthumously in 1989.

=== Classic fiction ===
In 1964 Keeping illustrated his first book for the Folio Society, an edition of Emily Brontë's Wuthering Heights. He disliked the book, finding the characters unconvincing, and so illustrated them in two-colour lithographs in an expressionist style, paying little attention to the faces. He had been contracted for twelve illustrations, but delivered twenty-two, and asked the publisher to choose the twelve best. He followed this with Erich Maria Remarque's All Quiet on the Western Front (1966) in a similar style. For the same publisher he illustrated Ghost Stories of M. R. James (1973), Horace Walpole's The Castle of Otranto (1976) and Victor Hugo's Les Misérables (2 volumes, 1976) in two-colour lithographs, and Fyodor Dostoyevsky's The Idiot (1971) in line drawings.

Beginning in 1978 with The Pickwick Papers, Keeping took on the mammoth task of illustrating the complete works of Charles Dickens for the Folio Society. His knowledge of the vanishing world of industrial London made him the perfect man for the job. The books were originally to be produced by letterpress printing, meaning the illustrations must be pure line drawings with no tones or washes. When they came to be published more modern printing techniques were used which would have allowed Keeping a full range of tones, but he had started with line drawings, so he used the same technique for the entire series, illustrating two books a year until he completed the task with Martin Chuzzlewit in 1988.

He also worked for another publisher of classic fiction, the Geneva-based Heron Books, for whom he illustrated works by Wilkie Collins, Joseph Conrad, Aldous Huxley, W. Somerset Maugham, Nevil Shute, Robert Louis Stevenson and H. G. Wells.

=== Other book illustration ===
In 1975 Keeping produced perhaps his most personal work, Cockney Ding Dong, a lavish 190-page volume collecting and illustrating the traditional songs of the family singalongs of his childhood. A record of some the songs was also released, featuring the voices of members of Keeping's family. Charles himself sings "They're Moving Father's Grave to Build a Sewer!"

=== Teaching ===
At the invitation of Henry Trivick, Keeping continued to use the printing presses at Regent Street Polytechnic after his graduation, and from 1956 to 1963 he lectured there one day a week. From 1963 he was a visiting lecturer at Croydon College of Art, initially in illustration, and after 1979 in lithography. His students included Fiona French.

== Personal life ==
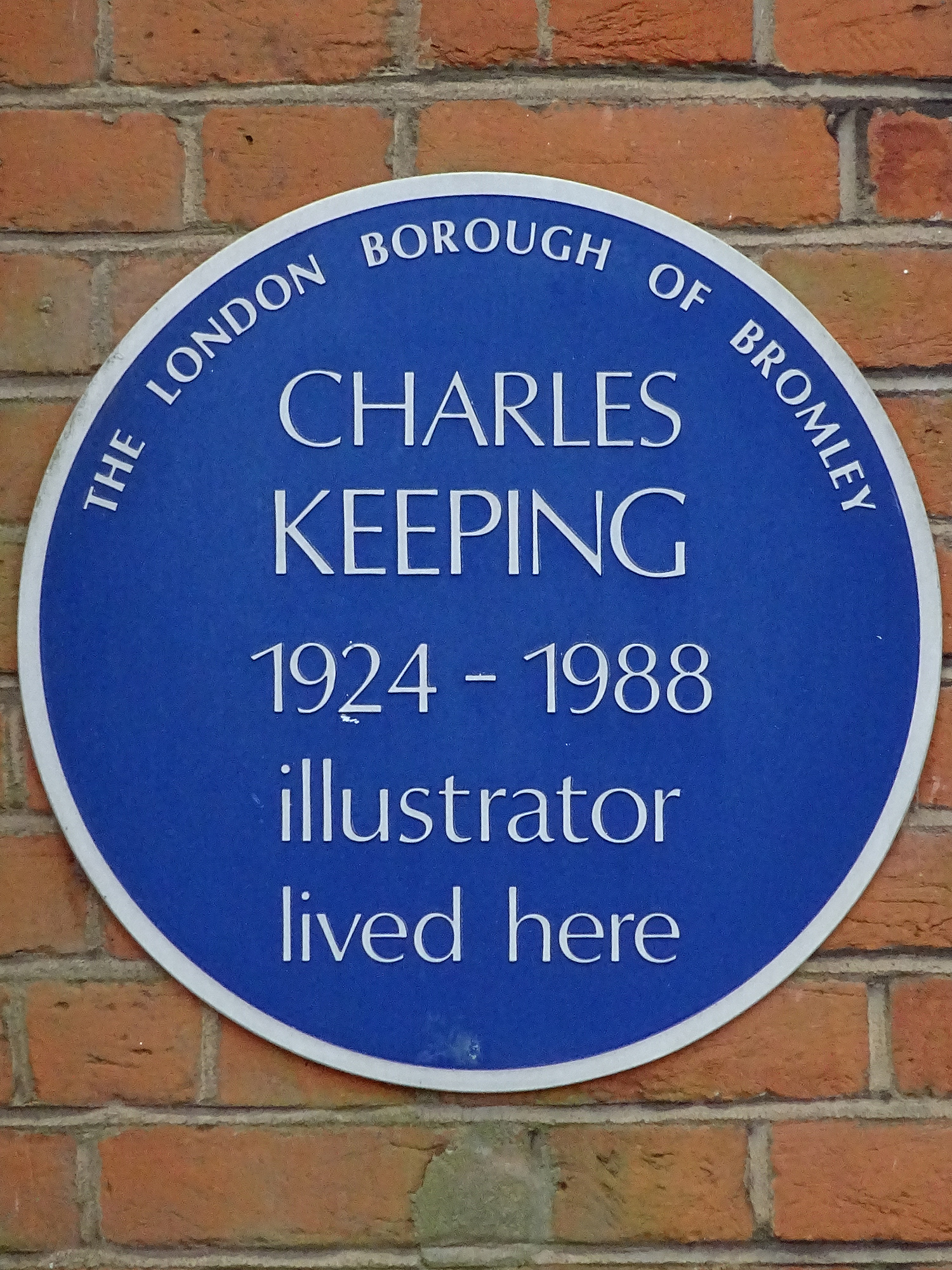
Blue plaque at 16 Church Road, Shortlands, Bromley BR2 0HP

Charles Keeping died of a brain tumour on 16 May 1988. His widow, Renate, ran the Keeping Gallery, displaying his and her own work for many years. She died in 2014.

== Reception ==
Keeping's work was controversial in some quarters. Some felt his work too flashy, and illustrator Edward Ardizzone is said to have referred to him as "that vulgar artist". Others felt that the frankness and violence of his work, and his taste for the morbid and macabre, were unsuitable for children. His biographer has commented,

His formidable originality within the picture-book convention may not have been altogether apparent to Keeping himself, which is both a strength and a weakness: the strength that he could communicate with unrivalled emotional intensity - but possibly only with one child in twenty; the concomitant weakness is that there was not a lot he could do to broaden this minority appeal and ensure that his books remained in print over longer periods.

— Douglas Martin (1993), Charles Keeping: an illustrator's life

Keeping's former editor Mabel George said of him, "I have always had a strong feeling that Charles was a true genius... it is my belief that he came to maturity very slowly (not in terms of technique, at which he was a master from his earliest days) but from the point of view of his self-confidence as an artist. ... he was all the time growing and developing as a man whose whole life, heart and mind, was dedicated to exploring the human situation in a universe that he found both beautiful and terrifying." His former teacher and fellow illustrator Nigel Lambourne has described him as "one of the few great illustrators we've got. A superb draughtsman, and he had – for all his marvellously brash, outgoing manner – an ability to tear up purposively anything that didn't work."

== Awards ==
The biennial Hans Christian Andersen Award conferred by the International Board on Books for Young People is the highest recognition available to a writer or illustrator of children's books. Keeping was one of three runners-up for the illustration award in 1974 and was the British nominee again in 1978. He won a Golden Apple award at the Biennial of Illustration Bratislava in 1975.

He won several awards for particular books.

- 1967 Kate Greenaway Medal, Charley, Charlotte and the Golden Canary, written by Keeping
- 1972 Francis Williams Award for Illustration, Tinker Tailor: Folk Song Tales (New York: World), tunes "arranged for voice and piano by K. Neil Slater" (WorldCat)
- 1977 Francis Williams Award for Illustration, The Wildman, written by Kevin Crossley-Holland
- 1981 Kate Greenaway Medal, The Highwayman, written by Alfred Noyes (1906)
- 1987 Kurt Maschler Award, or the Emil, Jack the Treacle Eater (Macmillan), with writer Charles Causley for integrated of writing and illustration in a British children's book
- 1988 W H Smith Illustration Award, Charles Keeping's Classic Tales of the Macabre, written by various authors

Keeping was also a runner-up for at least three Greenaway Medals, which then recognised the year's best children's book illustration by a British subject:

- 1969, Joseph's Yard, written by himself
- 1970, The God Beneath the Sea, written by Edward Blishen and Leon Garfield (who jointly won the annual British Carnegie Medal)
- 1974, Railway Passage (Oxford), written by himself

Railway Passage was the first runner up "Highly Commended" for the Medal. Both distinctions were abandoned after 2002.
