= Južni Vetar =

Južni Vetar (Serbian for "South Wind") may refer to:

- Južni Vetar (band), Serbian music band
- Južni Vetar (film), 2018 Serbian film
- Južni Vetar (TV series), 2020 Serbian TV series
- Južni Vetar 2: Ubrzanje, 2021 Serbian film
- Južni Vetar 2: Ubrzanje (TV series), 2022 Serbian TV series
- Južni Vetar: Na Granici, 2023 Serbian TV series

== See also ==
- South Wind (disambiguation)
