= Drums for Rancas =

1970 novel by Manuel Scorza

- First edition (Spanish)
- Author: Manuel Scorza
- Original title: Redoble por Rancas
- Translator: Edith Grossman
- Language: Spanish
- Genre: Magic realism, indigenist novel
- Publisher: Planeta (Spain); Harper & Row (US)
- Publication date: 1970
- Publication place: Peru
- English publication date: 1st edition (1977)
- ISBN: 978-0060138141
- LC Class: PZ4.S422 Dr3, PQ8497.S36 Dr3
- Preceded by: Poesía incompleta
- Followed by: Garabombo, the Invisible

Drums for Rancas (Spanish: Redoble por Rancas) is a 1970 novel by Peruvian author Manuel Scorza that represents the historical struggles of the inhabitants of the Department of Cerro de Pasco as they fight to recuperate control and ownership of their communal lands from the Peruvian government and multinational mining interests. Drums for Rancas is the first installment in Scorza’s five-part cycle "La Guerra silenciosa".

== Plot ==
In magical realist style, Drums for Rancas tells, in essence, two stories. Each story is told in alternate chapters, in what has best been described as a narrative double helix. The first story, told in the odd numbered chapters, is that of the impending, and finally frustrated, confrontation between Héctor Chacón “el Nictálope” and Judge Montenegro. The second, told in the even-numbered chapters, is that of the parallel confrontation between the comuneros of the subsistence agricultural community of Rancas and the multinational Cerro de Pasco Corporation; the latter’s presence manifested through the corporation’s goons and the anthropomorphized fence they install in the cover of darkness. This novel conforms with the rest of the Spanish-American indigenist novels in theme, but not so in style. The love that Scorza feels for his tattered Indians is conveyed by means of a tenderness coupled to a soft irony. His ragged, dirty heroes are the only characters in the novel endowed with a sense of dignity. There is in the plot an ever present atmosphere of impending doom, with "the Company" always in the background as a faceless, sinister force.

The villagers of Rancas are forced to wage a desperate and fruitless war against the colossal Pasto Corporation, which in the 1950s set out to build an immense empire in the Andes by fencing Quechua communities out of their grazing lands. The outcome is inevitable and typical of most Spanish- American novels of social protest: the oppressed serfs are massacred by the national army, always at the service of foreign interests. The novel ends with the souls of the dead Indians in their graves, talking about the fate they always have to suffer when facing the rich and the powerful.

== Characters ==
- The Fence

What is worth rescuing from Rancas is the arrival of the Fence. In the novel, the Fence itself becomes a character; indeed, it becomes the principle antagonist of the second narrative thread, parallel to Judge Montenegro — the greedy and corrupt subofficial — in the first thread. Scorza presents the Fence as an invading organism that rips a tear through the fabric of communal Andean life, yet what is more interesting is that the novel details the Fence’s arrival in the community.

The Fence first appears in an inchoate state, transported via that other hallmark of modernity’s late arrival to a savage frontier: the railroad. The train “vomits” forth a group of unknown men, men who we will later learn work for the Cerro de Pasco Corporation, a multinational mining company. The men unload rolls of wire; after a brief lunch, they begin digging post holes. At first, the ranqueños watch, amused, at the Fence (from this point on in the story, always capitalized as a proper noun) wraps its way around Huiska, one of the barren peaks in the region:

“Huiska is a barren peak. It hides no minerals. It has no water. It refuses to even grow the most miserable grass. Why enclose it? With its barbed-wire necklace Huiska looked like a cow shoved into a corral. The comuneros almost died laughing” _{(Drums 24)}.

Soon, however, the comuneros’ laughter dies down, as the Fence grows kilometers daily and devours everything in its path. It becomes a voracious worm that gobbles up lakes, peaks, and even towns. Locals must now walk kilometers along the length of the fence simply to traverse their villages: “Now the land, all the land, was growing old as a spinster behind a fence that no man’s feet could follow. The closest villages were days away” _{(Drums 181)}.
