= Edward Blishen =

English author and broadcaster (1920–1996)

- Born: 29 April 1920; Barnet, Hertfordshire, England
- Died: 13 December 1996 (aged 76); Hadley Wood, Hertfordshire, England
- Education: Queen Elizabeth's Grammar School, Barnet
- Occupations: Author and broadcaster
- Spouse(s): Nancy Smith, m. 1948
- Children: 2
- Awards: 1970 Carnegie Medal

Edward Blishen (29 April 1920 – 13 December 1996) was an English author and broadcaster. He may be known best for the first of two children's novels based on Greek mythology, written with Leon Garfield, illustrated by Charles Keeping, and published by Longman in 1970. For The God Beneath the Sea, Blishen and Garfield won the 1970 Carnegie Medal from the Library Association, recognising the year's best children's book by a British subject.

There is also his series of autobiographical books, including A Cack-Handed War (1972), a story describing his experiences as a conscientious objector, set against the backdrop of the Second World War, and Roaring Boys (1955), an honest account of teaching in a London secondary modern school in the 1950s, a book still valuable to understand teaching in a "rough" part of a city. Its sequel, This Right Soft Lot, was published in 1969. He finished the concluding volume of his autobiographical sequence, Mind How You Go, in 1996, just before his death; it was published posthumously by Constable in 1997.

== Biography ==
Edward Blishen was born in Barnet, Hertfordshire, England. He attended Queen Elizabeth's Grammar School, Barnet, and after failing his exams at the age of 17 he left school to work on a local newspaper.

When the Second World War was declared, he became a conscientious objector.

Later, he taught for three years teaching in a Hampstead prep school, before going on to a secondary modern school in Holloway Road, north London, where he wrote his best-selling first book, Roaring Boys, in 1955. Following its success, he gave up teaching in 1959 – although he did some part-time teaching at York University between 1963 and 1965 – in order to devote more time to writing and then to developing a career in broadcasting. Fans of Roaring Boys and its sequel, This Right Soft Lot, ranged from the novelist Kingsley Amis to former Labour Party leader Neil Kinnock.

For more than 33 years, from its inception in 1961 until, at least, 1994, Blishen was the editor of the Junior Pears Encyclopaedia, published by Pelham Books.

Blishen had a regular column in Young Elizabethan.

As a broadcaster, Blishen did some notable work with the BBC's African Service and later was a presenter of the BBC Radio 4 programme A Good Read and a regular contributor to Stop the Week.

He also compiled a number of collections in the Kingfisher Treasury of Stories series and Children's Classics to Read Aloud.

In June 1995, Blishen was awarded an honorary degree from the Open University as Doctor of the University.

He died in Hadley Wood, Hertfordshire, in 1996, at the age of 76. He had two sons and was married to Nancy Smith.

== Selected works ==
- Mind How You Go (Constable, 1997)
- The Penny World (Sinclair-Stevenson, 1990)
- The Disturbance Fee (Hamish Hamilton, 1988)
- The Outside Contributor (Hamish Hamilton, 1986)
- A Second Skin (Hamish Hamilton, 1984)
- Donkey Work (Hamish Hamilton, 1983)
- Lizzie Pye (Hamish Hamilton, 1982)
- Shaky Relations: An autobiography (Hamish Hamilton, 1981)
- A Nest of Teachers (Hamish Hamilton, 1980; Allison & Busby, 1985)
- Sorry, Dad (Hamish Hamilton, 1978; Allison & Busby, 1984)
- Uncommon Entrance (Thames & Hudson, 1974; Trafalgar Square Publishing, 1983)
- The Golden Shadow (Longman, 1973) ‡
- A Cack-Handed War (Thames & Hudson, 1972)
- The God Beneath the Sea (Longman, 1970) ‡
- This Right Soft Lot (Thames & Hudson, 1969; Panther, 1971)
- Roaring Boys: A Schoolmaster's Agony (Thames & Hudson, 1955; Panther, 1966)

‡ by Blishen and Leon Garfield, illustrated by Charles Keeping
