= Magdalena Mouján =

Mathematician and author

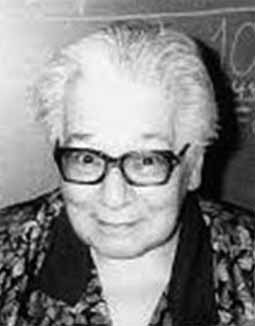
Magdalena Mouján

Magdalena Araceli Mouján Otaño (1926–2005) was an Argentine mathematician of Basque descent, a pioneer of Argentine computer science, operations research, and nuclear physics, and an award-winning science fiction author.

== Life ==
Mouján was born on March 26, 1926, in Pehuajó (Buenos Aires Province), the granddaughter of Basque writer Pedro Mari Otaño. After studying mathematics at the National University of La Plata, she completed a doctorate in 1950.

She went on to hold teaching positions at the Catholic University of La Plata, the National University of Córdoba, the National University of Comahue and the National University of Luján, with a temporary hiatus beginning in 1966 because of the Argentine Revolution.

She died on July 17, 2005, in Mar del Plata.

== Research ==
In 1957, Mouján became one of four founding members of an operations research group funded by the Argentine Army and led by mathematician Agustín Durañona y Vedia. In the 1960s, she joined the National Atomic Energy Commission and began using the Clementina computer, the first scientific computer in Argentina, at the University of Buenos Aires. Her calculations were used to help build the RA-1 Enrico Fermi nuclear reactor.

== Writing ==
Mouján began writing science fiction in the early 1960s under a pseudonym, "Inge Matquim". A science fiction story by Mouján, "Los Huáqueros", won joint first prize at Mardelcon, the 1968 Argentine science fiction convention.

Another of her stories, "Gu ta Gutarrak" (Basque for "we and ours"), was written in homage to her grandfather's 1899 poem of the same title, and as "a satire of the Basque nationalist myth of the antiquity and purity of the Basque race". It describes the adventures of a time-traveling Basque family who return to their homeland in the time of their ancestors. The story was accepted for a 1970 issue of the Spanish science fiction magazine Nueva Dimensión, but its publication was blocked by the Franco regime as being contrary to the ideals of Spanish unity. The story was translated into multiple languages, and finally republished by Nueva Dimensión in 1979, after Franco's death.
