= Jasper Ridley (historian) =

British writer, historian, and politician

Jasper Godwin Ridley, FRSL (25 May 1920 – 1 July 2004) was a British writer, known for historical biographies. He received the 1970 James Tait Black Memorial Prize for his biography of Lord Palmerston.

Born in West Hoathly, Sussex, he was educated at Felcourt School, Magdalen College, Oxford, and the Sorbonne. He trained and practised as a barrister, having been called to the bar by the Inner Temple in 1945, before starting to write. During the Second World War, he served with an air defence unit and manned an anti-aircraft battery at Portsmouth, where the man next to him was killed by shrapnel.

He served on St Pancras Borough Council from 1945 to 1949, and stood, unsuccessfully, as Labour Party candidate for Winchester in 1955 general election.

He married, in 1949, Vera Pollak, who died in 2002 and with whom he had two sons and a daughter.

== Works ==
- The Tate Gallery's Wartime Acquisitions (1942)
- The Law of the Carriage of Goods by Land, Sea and Air (1957)
- Nicholas Ridley (1957)
- Thomas Cranmer (1962)
- John Knox (1968)
- Lord Palmerston (1970)
- The Life and Times of Mary Tudor (1973)
- Garibaldi (1974)
- The Roundheads (1976)
- Napoleon III and Eugénie (1979)
- The History of England (1981)
- The Statesman and the Fanatic: Thomas Wolsey and Thomas More (1982); US title: Statesman and Saint: Cardinal Wolsey, Sir Thomas More, and the Politics of Henry VIII (1983)
- Henry VIII (1984); US title: Henry VIII: The Politics of Tyranny (1985)
- Elizabeth I (1987); US title: Elizabeth I: the Shrewdness of Virtue (1988)
- The Tudor Age (1988)
- The Love Letters of Henry VIII (1988) editor
- Maximilian and Juarez (1992)
- Tito (1994)
- A History of the Carpenters' Company (1995)
- Mussolini (1997)
- The Freemasons: A History of the World's Most Powerful Secret Society (1999)
- The Houses of Hanover and Saxe-Coburg-Gotha: A Royal History of England (2000) with John Clarke
- Bloody Mary's Martyrs: The Story of England’s Terror (2001)
- A Brief History of The Tudor Age (2002)
