= World Theatre Season =

Defunct festival in London, England

The World Theatre Season was a festival of foreign plays held annually at the Royal Shakespeare Company's Aldwych Theatre in London from 1964 to 1973, with a final season in 1975. It originated as a one-off celebration in 1964 organised by Peter Daubeny and the Royal Shakespeare Company as part of the celebrations for William Shakespeare's quatercentenary. In the 1950s, Peter Daubeny had presented foreign theatre companies, which gave him a knowledge of foreign theatre and served as a prelude to the World Theatre Seasons. Seven companies appeared at this initial World Theatre Season: Comédie Française; Schiller-Theater; Peppino de Filippo's Italian Theatre; Abbey Theatre; Polish Contemporary Theatre; Greek Art Theatre; and Moscow Art Theatre.

The season's success led to it becoming an annual event, with more than forty theatre companies appearing in total. Nevertheless, the seasons continued to be organised by Peter Daubeny without support from the Arts Council or any other official body. Theatrical companies visited from Europe, Asia and the Middle East, including evenings dedicated to Japanese nō and kabuki. Appearances at the World Theatre Season sometimes led to little-known plays achieving international acclaim, as was notably the case with Welcome Msomi's Umubatha, a Zulu version of Shakespeare's Macbeth, which was presented in 1972. Peter Daubeny's involvement in the World Theatre Seasons led to him winning the Evening Standard special award in 1972.
