= UMabatha =

1970 South African play by Welcome Msomi

uMabatha is a 1970 play written by South African playwright Welcome Msomi. It is an adaptation of Shakespeare's Macbeth set in the Zulu Kingdom during the early 19th century, and details how Mabatha overthrows Dangane.

Described as Msomi's "most famous" work, uMabatha was written when Msomi was a student at the University of Natal; it was first performed at the University's open-air theater in 1971. In 1972, it was performed at the Royal Shakespeare Company's Aldwych Theatre as part of that year's World Theatre Season, and has subsequently been performed in Italy, Scotland, Zimbabwe, and throughout America, including a "very successful off-Broadway season in 1978".

== In visual art ==
In 1975 the South African artist Lucky Sibiya made a portfolio of fifteen woodcuts based on the play, published by Gallery 21 in an edition of 225.

== Reception ==
Peter Ustinov said that, before seeing uMabatha, he did not truly understand Macbeth, while Gregory Doran stated that the 1995 Johannesburg production of uMabatha was "the best production of [Macbeth]" he had ever seen.

In response to the 1995 Johannesburg production, Nelson Mandela told Msomi that "(t)he similarities between Shakespeare's Macbeth and our own Shaka become a glaring reminder that the world is, philosophically, a very small place."
