= Manuel Scorza =

Peruvian novelist, poet, and political activist (1928-83)

- Novelist and Poet Manuel Scorza
- Born: September 9, 1928; Lima, Peru
- Died: November 27, 1983 (aged 55); Mejorada del Campo, Madrid, Spain
- Occupations: Novelist, Poet, Political activist
- Writing career
- Language: Spanish
- Period: 1955–1983

Manuel Scorza (September 9, 1928 – November 27, 1983) was a Peruvian novelist, poet, and political activist, exiled under the regime of Manuel Odría. He was born in Lima.

== Life and career ==
Scorza was a member of a student group affiliated with the American Popular Revolutionary Alliance (APRA) called The Poets of the People (Spanish: Los Poetas Del Pueblo).

He is best known for the series of five novels, known collectively as "The Silent War," that began with Redoble por Rancas (1970). All five have been translated into more than forty languages, including English.

He died when his plane, Avianca Flight 011, crashed on approach to Madrid's Barajas Airport after striking a series of hilltops. The crash killed 181 passengers, including Mexican novelist and playwright Jorge Ibargüengoitia, Uruguayan writer, academic, and literary critic Ángel Rama, and Argentinian art critic Marta Traba.

== Publications ==
- Las Imprecaciones (1955)
- Los adioses (1959)
- Desengaños del mago (1961)
- Poesía amorosa (1963)
- El vals de los reptiles (1970)
- Poesía incompleta (1970)
- "The Silent War" novels:
  Redoble por Rancas (1970) (Drums for Rancas, translated by Edith Grossman, 1977)
  Historia de Garabombo el Invisible (1972) (Garabombo, the Invisible, translated by Anna-Marie Aldaz, 1994)
  El Jinete Insomne (1977) (The Sleepless Rider, translated by Anna-Marie Aldaz, 1996)
  Cantar de Agapito Robles (1977) (The Ballad of Agapito Robles, translated by Anna-Marie Aldaz, 1999)
  La Tumba del Relámpago (1979) (Requiem for a Lightning Bolt, translated by Anna-Marie Aldaz, 2000)
- La danza inmóvil (1983)

== See also ==
- Peruvian literature
- List of Peruvian writers
- Guillermo Carnero Hoke, another member of Los Poetas Del Pueblo
