= Leon Garfield =

English writer (1921–1996)

- Born: 14 July 1921; Brighton, Sussex, England
- Died: 2 June 1996 (aged 74); Islington, London, England
- Occupation: Writer
- Writing career
- Period: 1964–1996
- Genres: Children's historical novels, literary adaptation of classical myth and legend
- Notable work: The God Beneath the Sea
- Notable awards: Guardian Prize; 1967; Carnegie Medal; 1970

Leon Garfield FRSL (14 July 1921 – 2 June 1996) was a British author. He is best known for children's historical novels, though he also wrote for adults. He wrote more than thirty books and scripted Shakespeare: The Animated Tales for television. His retellings of Shakespeare for young readers were published as Shakespeare Stories. Garfield won the inaugural Guardian Prize for Devil-in-the-Fog, the Carnegie Medal for The God Beneath the Sea, a retelling of Greek mythology cowritten with Edward Blishen and the Whitbread Award for John Diamond. He wrote an ending for The Mystery of Edwin Drood, left unfinished at the death of Charles Dickens.

== Life ==
Garfield attended Brighton Grammar School (1932–1938) and went on to study art at Regent Street Polytechnic, but his studies were interrupted first by lack of funds for fees, then by the outbreak of World War II. He married Lena Leah Davies in April, 1941, at Golders Green Synagogue but they separated after only a few months. For his service in the war he joined the Royal Army Medical Corps. While posted in Belgium he met Vivien Alcock, then an ambulance driver, who became his second wife (in 1948) and a well-known children's author. She also greatly influenced Garfield's writing, giving him suggestions, including the original idea for Smith.

After the war Garfield worked as a biochemical laboratory technician at the Whittington Hospital in Islington, writing in his spare time until the 1960s, when he was successful enough to write full-time.

In 1964 the Garfields adopted a baby girl whom they called Jane after Jane Austen, a favourite writer of both parents.

Garfield wrote his first book, the pirate novel Jack Holborn, for adult readers, but an editor at Constable & Co. saw its potential as a children's novel and persuaded Garfield to adapt it for younger readers. In that form it was published by Constable in 1964. His second book, Devil-in-the-Fog (1966), won the inaugural Guardian Prize and was serialised for television, as were several of his later works (below). Devil was the first of several historical adventure novels, typically set late in the eighteenth century and featuring a character of humble origins (in this case a boy from a family of travelling actors) pushed into the midst of a threatening intrigue. Another is Smith (1967), in which the eponymous hero, a young pickpocket, is accepted into a wealthy household; it won the Phoenix Award in 1987. Yet another is Black Jack (1968), in which a young apprentice is forced by accident and his conscience to accompany a murderous criminal.

Garfield started to move in new directions with The God Beneath the Sea (1970), a re-telling of numerous Greek myths in one narrative, co-authored with Edward Blishen and illustrated by Charles Keeping. It won the annual Carnegie Medal for best British children's book. Garfield, Blishen, and Keeping collaborated again on a sequel, The Golden Shadow (1973). The Drummer Boy (1970) was another adventure story, but concerned more with a central moral problem, and apparently aimed at somewhat older readers, a trend continued in The Prisoners of September (1975), republished in 1989 by Lions Tracks under the title Revolution!, The Pleasure Garden (1976) and The Confidence Man (1978). The Strange Affair of Adelaide Harris (1972) is a black comedy in which two boys decide to test the plausibility of the tale of Romulus and Remus, using the baby sister of one of the boys. Most notable at the time was a series of linked long short stories about apprentices, published separately between 1976 and 1978, and then as a collection, The Apprentices. The more adult-themed books of the mid-1970s met with a mixed reception and Garfield returned to the model of his earlier books with John Diamond, which won a Whitbread Award in 1980, and The December Rose (1986). In 1980 he also wrote an ending for The Mystery of Edwin Drood, unfinished at Dickens's death in 1870.

Garfield was elected a fellow of the Royal Society of Literature in 1985. On 2 June 1996 he died of cancer at the Whittington Hospital, where he had once worked.

== Style, themes and influences ==
Garfield's novels for children all have historical settings. The early novels are mostly set in the late eighteenth century, but from John Diamond on they tend to be set in the nineteenth century. They are not novels about major historical events, which are rarely depicted, or social conditions, which provide only starting points for the personal stories of the characters. In the few novels in which Garfield handles actual events he writes of them from the limited and subjective viewpoints of his characters.

The novels owe much to Charles Dickens and to Robert Louis Stevenson. The latter's Treasure Island clearly provided a model for Jack Holborn, with its shifting alliances of manipulative characters in pursuit of a treasure. Garfield also acknowledged the brothers in Stevenson's The Master of Ballantrae as inspiration for the book. Beyond these specific debts, Garfield shares Stevenson's fondness for binding a relatively conservative hero to a more forceful personality outside the bounds of conventional morality. (Note: For example, in the pirate stories Jack Holborn and Black Jack on Garfield's part. Consider Stevenson's supporting characters Alan Breck Stewart in Kidnapped and Long John Silver in Treasure Island.) Another recurring plot line, most evident in Smith and The December Rose, in which an outcast is integrated into a supporting household, owes more to Dickens. Garfield also shares with Dickens a preference for urban settings, generally in London.

Garfield's father broke off contact with him when he divorced his Jewish wife. Roni Natov argues that this may have had an influence on Garfield's work, giving particular significance to fathers and father figures.

== Film and television ==
Many of Garfield's books have been adapted for film or television: Devil-in-the-Fog was televised in 1968; Smith in 1970; The Strange Affair of Adelaide Harris was made into a 6-part BBC serial in 1979; Black Jack was made into a feature film by Ken Loach in the same year; John Diamond was made into a BBC television series in 1981; Jack Holborn was made into the German Christmas mini-series Jack Holborn by ZDF in 1982; The Ghost Downstairs was televised in 1982; the following year, "The Restless Ghost" was included in the Dramarama:Spooky series; "Mr Corbett's Ghost" was made into a television film with Paul Scofield and John Huston in 1987. In addition Garfield himself wrote the script for the 1986 television serial, The December Rose, afterwards adapting it as a novel, and for Shakespeare: The Animated Tales (1992 and 1994), a well regarded Russian animation of Shakespeare, commissioned by the Welsh Channel Four, S4C; for this he was awarded the 1995 Sam Wanamaker Award.

== Awards ==
Devil-in-the-Fog (1966) won the inaugural Guardian Children's Fiction Prize in 1967. The newspaper-sponsored Prize is judged by a panel of children's writers and it annually recognises one new British children's novel by an author who has not won it.

The God Beneath the Sea (1970) won the annual Carnegie Medal from the Library Association, recognising the year's best children's book by a British subject that has not previously won the prize. (Note: The Carnegie Medal had been established as a once-in-a-lifetime award in 1936 and the restriction was retained for a few decades before it became a true "year's best" award for British children's books. The Carnegie Medal for 1966 publications was "withheld as no book considered suitable"; a new distinction, Highly Commended books, was introduced and conferred upon The Bayeux Tapestry: The Story of the Norman Conquest, 1066 by Norman Denny and Josephine Filmer-Sankey.^{CCSU} As nonfiction that work was ineligible for the Guardian Prize, the new once-in-a-lifetime award that Garfield won.) From 1967 to 1970 Garfield was also a Commended runner up for the Carnegie Medal three times, for Smith, Black Jack, and Drummer Boy, the latter in competition with his Medal-winning work. (Note: Today there are usually eight books on the Carnegie shortlist. According to CCSU, there were about 160 commendations of two kinds in 49 years from 1954 to 2002, including four for 1967 (one highly commended), three 1968, and three 1970.)

John Diamond (1980) won the annual Whitbread Literary Award, Children's Novel, a year's best award that considers enjoyable reading for a wide audience, as well as literary merit.

Smith won the 1987 Phoenix Award (from the mythical phoenix, which is reborn from its ashes) from the Children's Literature Association as the best English-language children's book that did not win a major award when originally published.

Francis Spufford named The God Beneath the Sea in his canon of children's literature, calling it "visceral, overpowering, defiantly undomesticated", adding, "Read this as a child, and ever after you understand why Prometheus and Pandora are down there at the roots of the West's imagination."

In the May Hill Arbuthnot Honor Lecture, Philip Pullman praised Garfield as "someone who put the best of his imagination into everything he wrote", particularly praising The Pleasure Garden.

== Selected works ==
- Jack Holborn (1964)
- Devil-in-the-Fog (1966)
- Smith (1967)
- Black Jack (1968)
- Mister Corbett's Ghost and Other Stories (1969)
- The Drummer Boy (1970)
- The God Beneath the Sea (Longman, 1970) ‡
- The Strange Affair of Adelaide Harris (1971)
- The Ghost Downstairs (1972)
- The Golden Shadow (Longman, 1973) ‡
- The Sound of Coaches (1974), illus. John Lawrence
- The Prisoners of September (1975)
- The Pleasure Garden (1976)
- The Confidence Man (1978)
- The Apprentices (1978)
- Bostock and Harris (1979); US title, The Night of the Comet
- John Diamond (Kestrel, 1980); US title, Footsteps
- The Mystery of Edwin Drood (Deutsch, 1980), by Charles Dickens and Garfield
- Fair's Fair (1981), illus. Margaret Chamberlain, picture book
- The House of Cards (1982)
- Shakespeare Stories (1985), illus. Michael Foreman
- The Wedding Ghost (1985)
- The December Rose (1986)
- The Empty Sleeve (1988)
- Blewcoat Boy (1988)
- Shakespeare Stories II (1994), illus. Michael Foreman

‡ The God Beneath the Sea (1970) and The Golden Shadow (1973) were written by Garfield and Edward Blishen, illustrated by Charles Keeping, and published by Longman.
