= Peter Daubeny =

Sir Peter Lauderdale Daubeny, CBE (16 April 1921, Wiesbaden, Germany – 6 August 1975, London) was a British theatre impresario.

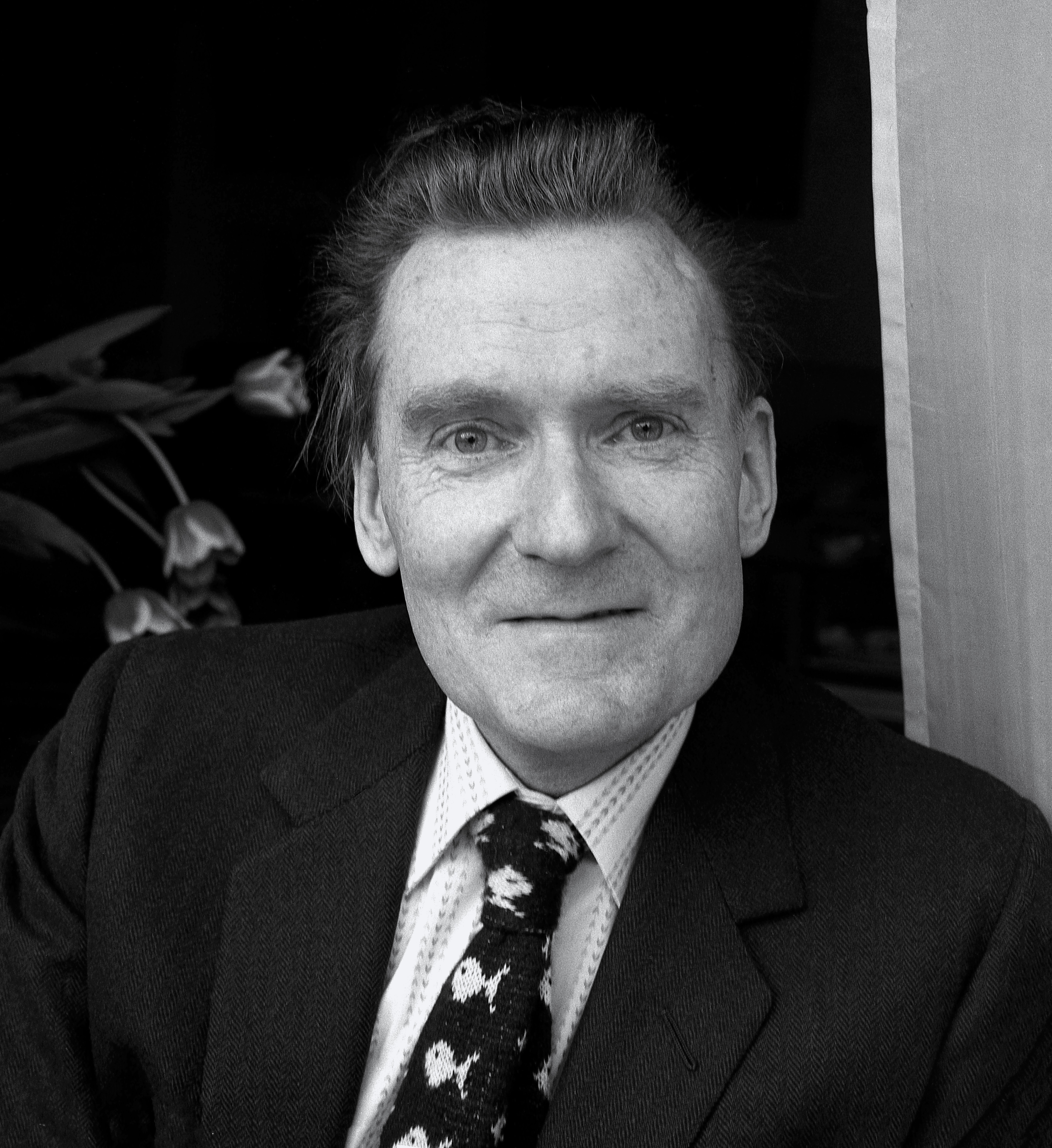
Image of Sir Peter Daubeny

Daubeny trained with Michel Saint-Denis and began his career under the director William Armstrong at the Liverpool Playhouse. Losing his left-arm at Salerno in 1943 led to him abandoning an acting career and staging his own productions including Franz Werfel's Jacobowsky and the Colonel in 1945. The London visits of the Berliner Ensemble in 1956 and the Moscow Art Theatre were organised by Daubeny.

Henry Kendall (actor), in Chapter 23 of his autobiography, 'I Remember Romano's', 'An Alligator and Mr. Chaplin', (Macdonald, London, 1960), wrote that Daubney asked him in 1955 to " ...keep an eye on his (Daubney's) revival at the Palace", (Palace Theatre, London), of The Merry Widow, starring Jan Kiepura and Marta Eggerth, while he was on business in Paris.

He is best remembered for his organisation of the World Theatre Season, which brought foreign theatre companies to London between 1964 and 1975. Amongst other honours, including an OBE in the 1961 Birthday Honours and a CBE in the 1967 New Year Honours, he was knighted in the 1973 Birthday Honours.
