= Welcome Msomi =

South African playwright, actor, and writer (1943–2020)

- Born: 1943; Durban
- Died: July 2020 (aged 76–77)
- Occupations: playwright, actor, and writer
- Notable work: uMabatha

Welcome Msomi (1943 in Durban - July 2020) was a South African playwright, actor, and writer best known for the play uMabatha, which was an adaptation of Shakespeare's Macbeth into Zulu culture.

== Early life ==
Msomi wrote his first book at age 15.

== Legal problems ==
In 2019 Msomi was arrested regarding theft and embezzlement of 8 million rands, and pleaded guilty on all 61 charges. His lawyer subsequently argued that he was too ill to serve a prison sentence, noting that Msomi had suffered a stroke and spent time in a diabetic coma.

== Death ==
In 2020, Msomi died as a result of illness.

== Works ==
=== Play ===
- uMabatha (1970)
