= Abdelhamid ben Hadouga =

Algerian writer

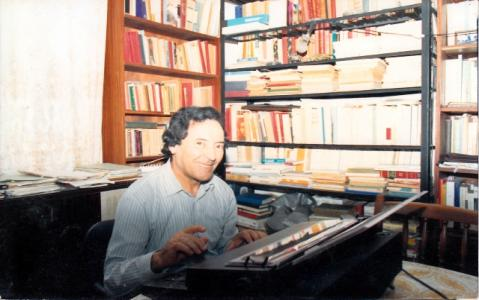
- Born: January 9, 1925; Mansourah, Algeria
- Died: October 26, 1996 (aged 71); Algiers, Algeria
- Other name: Abdelhamid Benhedouga

Abdelhamid ben Hadouga or Abdelhamid Benhedouga (in Arabic عبد الحميد بن هدوقة) was an Algerian writer, born on 9 January 1925 in Mansourah near Bordj Bou Arréridj to an Arab Algerian father and a Berber mother. He wrote more than fifteen novels in Arabic as well as short stories and plays. He has been described as one of the most important Algerian writers in Arabic of his time. He also worked for cultural programming in a number of radio stations in Paris, Tunisia and Algeria. Between 1957 and 1974, he wrote tens of theatrical pieces and sketches for the BBC Arabic Service, Tunisian radio and TéléDiffusion d'Algérie. His novel Vent du Sud was adapted to a feature film. many of his books were translated to French. Ben Hadouga died on 26 October 1996.

== Books ==
- 1958: Al Djazair Bayn elamsi wal yawmi (Algeria between yesterday and today), series of articles
- 1960: Dhilalun Djazaïria (Algerian shades), Beirut
- 1962: Al‑Ashiaa As‑Sabâa (The seven rays), 10 stories, Tunis
- 1967: Al‑Arwah Ash‑Shaghira (The vacant spirits), poems, Algiers, Sned editions
- 1971: Rih al Djanoub (Le Vent du Sud / The wind of the South), novel, Algiers, Sned editions
- 1974: Al Kateb wa Qissas Okhra (The writer and other stories), Algiers, Sned editions
- 1974: Nihayatou al Ams (The end of yesterday), novel, Algiers, Sned editions
- 1981: Banae As‑Soubh (La mise à nu), novel, Algiers, Sned editions
- 1992: Wa Ghadan Yaoum Djadid (And tomorrow is a new day), novel, Al Andalous editions
