= The South Wind (novel) =

1970 novel by Abdelhamid ben Hadouga

The South Wind (Arabic: ريح الجنوب; lit. 'The Wind of the South') is an Arabic-language Algerian novel written by Abdelhamid ben Hadouga. It was ranked the 53rd in the list of the 105 best Arabic novels issued by the Arab Writers Union, and made into a film in 1976.

== Themes ==
The plot focuses on a young woman named Nafisa, who comes home for the summer holidays from university to find that her father Abed bin al-Qadi wants her to marry one of the men of the village, though she does not wish to.

In this work, the author demonstrates his commitment to the Arab identity as well as generational conflicts and the problems faced by women. One of the characters in the novel exclaims, "The armed revolution delivered us from colonization, but it didn't succeed in freeing us from our prejudices. We need another revolution. But who will make it happen?"

== Plot ==
The events of the novel begin on Friday morning - market day. Abed bin Al-Qadi is preparing to go to the market with his son Abdul Qadir when he forms the idea of marrying his daughter Nafisa to Malik, the Sheikh of the municipality. A few days later, the village celebrates the inauguration of a cemetery for the sons of the martyrs who fell during the war of liberation. Abed bin Al-Qadi invites the people of the village into his house, seeking to impress Malik, though Malik is not keen on the idea of the engagement.

Days pass, and the father remains determined to marry off his daughter to Malik, so Nafisa decides to escape. The next market day, while the women go to the cemetery, she goes out in disguise wearing her father's cape and heads for the station on a path through a forest. On her way, she is bitten by a snake and faints but is found by Rabeh, a local shepherd who recognizes her and takes her back to his house to live in secret with his mute mother. Nevertheless, news spreads in the village, and Nafisa’s father knows that she is with Rabeh, so he goes to Rabeh’s house and tries to kill him. Rabeh’s mother rushes at Abed bin Al-Qadi with an axe and strikes him on the head. After that, she pushes Nafisa out of the house, and Nafisa returns to her father's house after her failed attempt to escape.

== Translations and adaptation ==
First published in Arabic by al-Mu’assasah al-Watanīyah lil-Kitāb in 1970. First published in French as Le Vent du Sud by Société Nationale d’Edition et de Diffusion in 1970 (trans. Marcel Bois); first published in Spanish as El Viento del Sur by Instituto Hispano-Arabe de Cultura in 1981 (trans. Marcelino Villegas). The novel has since been translated into around twenty languages.

The 1976 film adaptation of the novel by Mohamed Slim Riad altered the ending of the story, in which Nafisa reaches the station and her father does not manage to catch up with her in time to stop her. The film ends with a shot of father and daughter smiling at each other.
