= The Trojan Brothers =

The Trojan Brothers may refer to:

- The Trojan Brothers (novel), a 1944 comedy novel by Pamela Hansford Johnson
- The Trojan Brothers (film), a 1946 British comedy film based on the novel
