= Geoff Peterson =

Animatronic human skeleton

- The Late Late Show with Craig Ferguson character
- First appearance: April 5, 2010, on The Late Late Show with Craig Ferguson
- Last appearance: December 19, 2014, on The Late Late Show with Craig Ferguson
- Voiced by: Josh Robert Thompson
- Designed and built by: Grant Imahara

In-universe information
- Species: Animatronic human skeleton
- Occupation: Talk show sidekick

Geoff Peterson is an animatronic human skeleton that served as the sidekick on the late-night talk show The Late Late Show with Craig Ferguson. He was voiced and operated by Josh Robert Thompson and first appeared on The Late Late Show on April 5, 2010. Often referred to as a "robot skeleton", Peterson is a radio-controlled animatronic robot puppet designed and built by Grant Imahara of MythBusters.

Geoff has glowing blue eyes, a metal mohawk (which is sometimes covered by a Santa Claus hat in December) and wears an oversized suit with his name scrawled on a contestant's name tag from The Price Is Right on his jacket, as well as Mardi Gras beads and a Super Bowl XLVII press pass around his neck. He serves as a co-host of sorts and Ferguson refers to him as "my gay robot pal". He was most visible during the first half of the show (the cold openings, monologues, and Tweets and Emails segments) and the final segment, "What Did We Learn on the Show Tonight, Craig?".

According to a tweet from Imahara dated on December 23, 2016, Ferguson took the robot home as a souvenir after his run on The Late Late Show ended.

== Creation ==
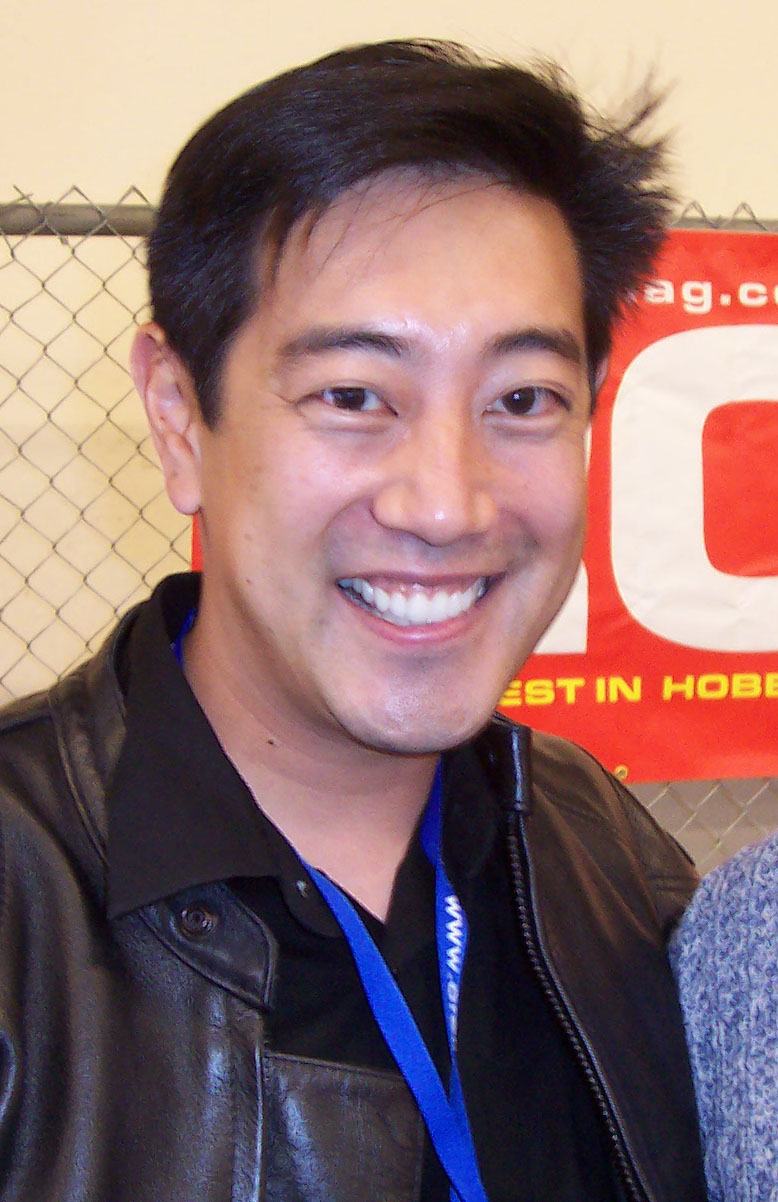
Grant Imahara designed and built Geoff Peterson.

The idea came from Craig Ferguson's repeated tongue-in-cheek on-air complaints that his show suffered due to its lack of a house band or sidekick, and he expressed desire to have his own "Robot Skeleton Army". Robot Skeleton Army is Ferguson's name for his Twitter followers, a reference to the cybernetic creatures from the Terminator franchise. Part of the inspiration for Geoff also came from Nicolas Cage's character in the 2007 film Ghost Rider, of which Craig was a fan. MythBusters' Grant Imahara volunteered to create the robot if Ferguson could get him 100,000 Twitter followers, which he achieved within 24 hours. On the idea and development of Geoff:

Initially, I wanted something which represented some kind of deconstructionist contempt for the late-night genre and the idea of a sidekick, but [Josh Thompson] became so good at it, he just became a sidekick.

— Craig Ferguson, April 2012

According to Imahara, he worked on it on weekends and in his spare time, creating a "plastic skeleton with aluminum bones and torso" that "shares a lot with R2-D2 and the Energizer Bunny" (both of which Imahara had previously worked on). Ferguson was directly involved and "very into the design of it"; he and the show's writers "think they may want to send Geoff out into the world, interview people—things like that". Imahara says the name "Geoff Peterson" was chosen by Ferguson:

There was sort of a Twitter online poll as to what the name for the robot would be. And some people were saying "Roboskelly," some people were "Fergbot," there was probably about half a dozen names that people were talking about. And Craig just said, "No, the name is Geoff Peterson."

— Grant Imahara, April 2010

Initially, the robot was able to say seven prerecorded phrases, triggered by buttons under Craig's desk. This was later upgraded to wireless control by one of the show's writers offstage using an iPad. Peterson was upgraded again in July 2010, allowing him to shake his head, keep his jaw open, and move his right hand up and down. Ferguson noted that this is because his "wise ass" chip was activated. On September 2, 2013, new upgrades were debuted; the right arm was given an elbow, and the previously motionless left arm was given full movement (although his left hand fell off during that night's episode). He could turn his eye lights off and on to simulate closing and opening his eyes. Thompson noted the difficulty in controlling Geoff, since he had to time his talking with pressing the button that moved Geoff's jaw.

== Role ==
Peterson made occasional comments and one-liners throughout the show and helped with the Twitter and email segment of the show. His comments were broad and often said as a segue to another joke or to make fun of something else, including Peterson himself, or as humorous non sequiturs. Thompson said that his banter as Peterson with Ferguson was heavily improvised, which occasionally led to both Ferguson and Thompson/Peterson breaking into laughter. Peterson is also sent as the show's red carpet correspondent for film premieres.

He was featured in numerous videos of "Tweets and E-mails" jingles. The first three were a parody of a Bollywood Filmi musical performance, a parody of an 80's glam metal performance, and a Rick James parody. Terminator-esque robot skeletons, which pre-date Peterson, appeared in jingles that parody the musical performances of artists such as Kraftwerk, David Bowie, Bob Dylan, Gary Glitter, and Johnny Cash. Peterson did not interact with the guests unless "they want to play around with him."

For Peterson's first anniversary, The Late Late Show filmed a sketch in Las Vegas that aired on the April 14, 2011, show. The segment depicted Ferguson, Peterson, and T.J. the Leprechaun partaking in "hallucinogenic frozen custard" with comedian Carrot Top and their subsequent gallivanting around Vegas. The sketch also featured appearances by Grant Imahara, Donny Osmond, Secretariat (the show's pantomime horse, voiced by Josh Thompson impersonating Morgan Freeman), and Wavy and Sid (Ferguson's alligator and rabbit puppets), which culminated in Ferguson and Peterson marrying one another at a typical Vegas chapel. For the episode, Peterson's voice was performed live for the first time by Thompson.

Peterson's backstory was depicted during an episode which originally aired on January 3, 2012, opening with a skit purporting to be from Ferguson's first episode.

== Personality ==
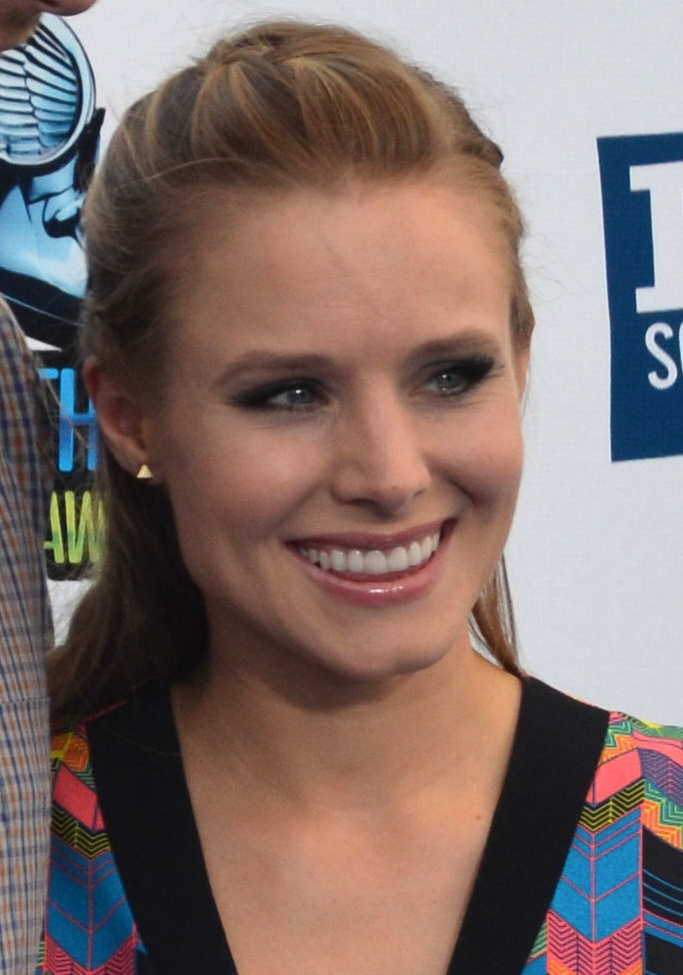
Peterson had a years-long recurring "feud" with actress Kristen Bell.

Thompson referred to Peterson as a homosexual skeleton robot during a live stand-up routine while opening for Craig Ferguson in Hershey, PA on October 9, 2012. Peterson is generally amicable and friendly, usually providing humorous banter with Ferguson and the guests. However, he could be incredibly sarcastic to them and share juvenile jokes, with a recurring one-liner being, "....in your pants!" He could be defensive and easily angered if provoked by Ferguson or a guest, usually exclaiming "What the Hell, man?!" if he was called out for his behavior or comments. A running gag on the show involved Ferguson making fun of how Peterson can only move one arm, and is unable to walk away from his lectern, although he is somehow able to play an invisible harmonica. Peterson was later upgraded so that he could move both arms. On numerous occasions, Ferguson taunted Peterson's requests, questions, and comments with his various mobility problems, with Peterson usually exclaiming "How dare you?" in response.

As he is considered "dead" resulting in his status as a skeleton, Peterson's cause of death varies from a skydiving accident, a bar fight with Wilford Brimley, being massively overweight, choking on a bird's foot, and a methamphetamine overdose. He is extremely rich, acquiring his fortune from a successful chain of laundromats, and owns houses all over the world.

Peterson had a mock feud with frequent guest Kristen Bell, who claimed that she had wanted to be Ferguson's sidekick and was upset when Peterson was selected. Peterson typically gave her a lukewarm, sometimes nasty greeting, and she would express feeling very uncomfortable around him and would often antagonize and insult him during her interviews with Ferguson. As of August 2011, Peterson and Bell had supposedly reconciled while in Paris shooting Le Late Late Show avec Craig Ferguson à Paris, although they continued to occasionally insult and dismiss one another.

== Voice ==
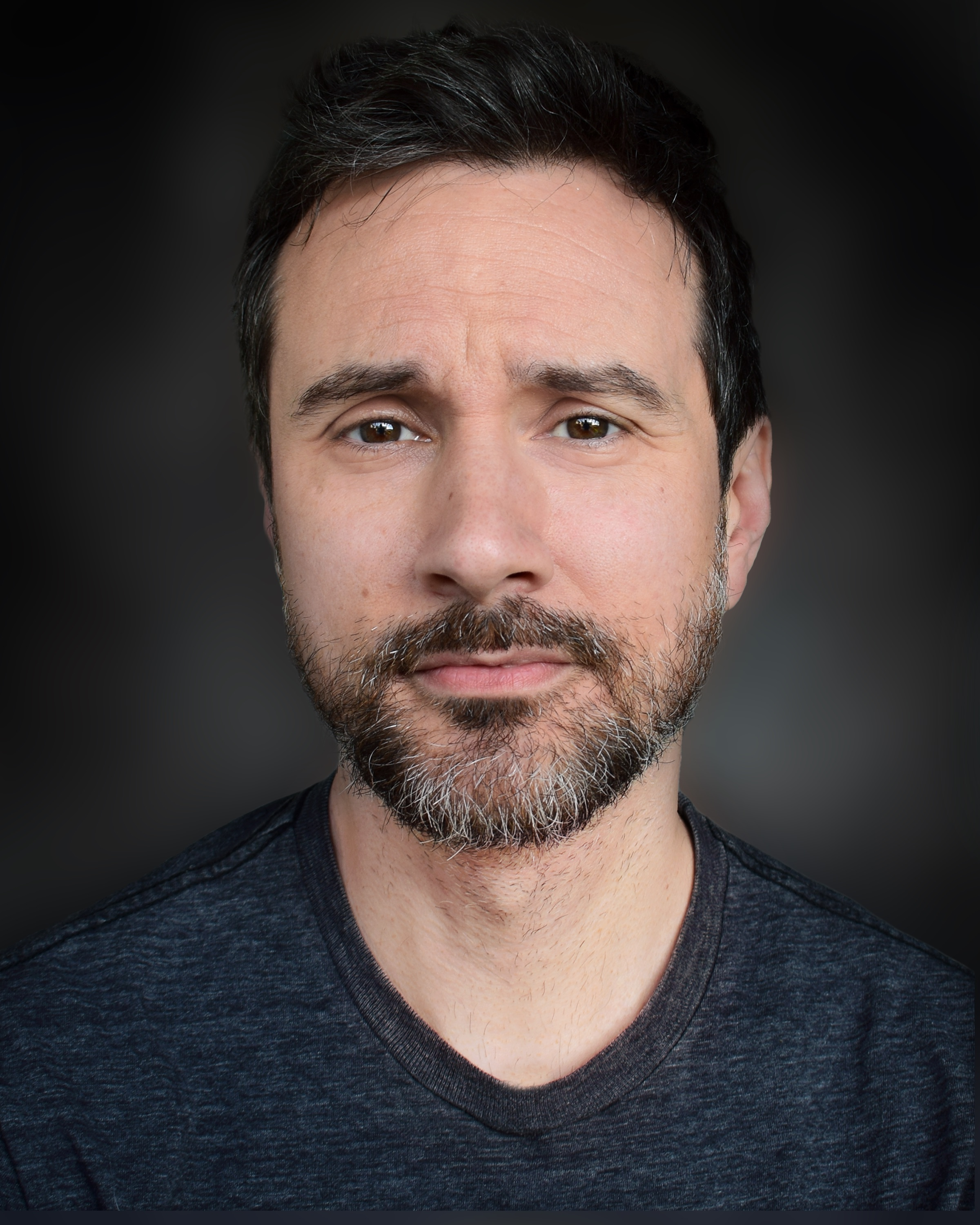
Josh Robert Thompson performed the voice of Geoff Peterson.

Peterson's voice was originally performed by Ferguson in a loud, monotone, English accent; but this was soon changed. Starting on April 20, 2010, Josh Robert Thompson voiced Geoff Peterson using prerecorded clips of a vaguely George Takei–sounding voice. From April 14, 2011, on, Thompson began to occasionally voice and perform Peterson live in-studio, and on May 16, 2011, in a possible backdoor audition, Thompson performed Peterson in an actual guest spot. From June 29, 2011, onward, Thompson voiced and performed Peterson in-person for virtually every episode, including those filmed in France and Scotland. In April 2012, shortly after the news that Ferguson would continue his show until at least 2014, Ferguson told one interviewer that as far as he was concerned, Thompson "has a home" portraying Peterson for "as long as he wants to do it".

Thompson described Peterson's voice as "one part Snagglepuss, one part Vincent Price, two parts George Takei". Thompson says his live segments are "100% unscripted and improvised". Since Thompson began voicing Geoff Peterson live, he has incorporated several of his own impressions into the character's repertoire. He also performed his Morgan Freeman impression for Freeman himself on June 10, 2011, asking the amazed actor "Would you like to hear my Morgan Freeman voice?" and "What would you like to say to yourself?". Freeman called the impression "outstanding".

When Thompson was unavailable for two weeks starting with the November 7, 2011 show, Peterson was voiced by several celebrities: Alfred Molina, Dominic Monaghan, Thomas Lennon, Larry King, Louie Anderson, Lauren Graham, Paula Poundstone, Angela Kinsey, Jason Schwartzman, and Shadoe Stevens each for a single episode. During Thompson's absence in November 2011 and on December 19 for Christmas week, Thomas Lennon again provided the voice of Peterson, in an alternate persona for Peterson known as Khloe Banderas.

== Reception ==
Dorsey Shaw of New York magazine's Vulture blog described Peterson as "the de facto animatronic 'King of the One-Liners' for this generation". Jaime Weinman of Maclean's said: "I think my favorite part of that is just the decision to give this mohawked skeleton robot a name as prosaically normal as Geoff Peterson." Tom Jicha of Sun-Sentinel said that "some nights he's ridiculous, verbally jousting with the robot he [Ferguson] created and named, Geoff Peterson". Linda Holmes of NPR's Monkey See blog listed Peterson on her list of "50 Wonderful Things From 2010", writing: "Ferguson continues to be wonderful at what he does, and this was a marvelous marriage of the sensibility of his show with the sensibility of Mythbusters." TV Guide ranked Peterson as one of their favorite robots in film and television. Josh Kurp of Uproxx named his "happy video" as a clip from The Late Late Show uploaded to YouTube by Thompson which featured Peterson making Ferguson cry from laughter, calling it a "genuinely silly, a spontaneous connection between two comedians amusing not only the audience, but also themselves."

Guests have often praised the chemistry between Ferguson and Peterson during their interviews on The Late Late Show. Regis Philbin said "Y'know the robot? I've actually fell [sic] in love. I wasn't sure of the robot but he's grown on me. I think it's a great combination. You [Ferguson] say something funny, you turn around and look at him, and he [Peterson] says something funnier!"

== See also ==
- Gay Robot
