= The Trojan Brothers (film) =

1946 British film by Maclean Rogers

- Directed by: Maclean Rogers
- Written by: Irwin Reiner; Maclean Rogers
- Based on: The Trojan Brothers by Pamela Hansford Johnson
- Produced by: Louis H. Jackson
- Starring: Patricia Burke; David Farrar; Bobby Howes
- Cinematography: Moray Grant; Ernest Palmer
- Edited by: Paul Capon
- Music by: Hans May
- Production company: British National Films
- Distributed by: Anglo-American Film Corporation
- Release date: 4 February 1946
- Running time: 85 minutes
- Country: United Kingdom
- Language: English

The Trojan Brothers (also known as Murder in the Footlights) is a 1946 British comedy film directed by Maclean Rogers and starring Patricia Burke, David Farrar and Bobby Howes. It was written by Irwin Reiner and Rogers adapted from the 1944 novel of the same title by Pamela Hansford Johnson.

== Synopsis ==
The two halves of a London music hall act performing together as a pantomime horse have a sharp falling out when one of them begins a relationship with an attractive society woman.

== Cast ==
- Patricia Burke as Betty Todd
- David Farrar as Sid Nichols
- Bobby Howes as Benny Castelli
- Barbara Mullen as Margie Castelli
- Lesley Brook as Ann Devon
- David Hutcheson as Cyril Todd
- Finlay Currie as W.H. Maxwell
- Wylie Watson as stage manager
- Joan Hickson as Ada
- Gus McNaughton as Frank
- George Robey as Old Sam
- Bransby Williams as Tom Hockaby
- Annette D. Simmonds as Charlie
- Roma Milne as Lorna
- Hugh Dempster as Tommy
- Grace Arnold as Mrs. Johnson
- Joyce Blair as Beryl Johnson
- Shirley Renton as Connie Johnson
- Carol Lawton as Sandra
- H. F. Maltby as Colonel Robbins
- Vincent Holman as P.C. Graves
- Vi Kaley as Mrs. Hopkins
- Doorn Van Steyn as Mrs. Hopkins' sister #1
- Joy Frankau as Mrs. Hopkins' sister #2
- Patricia Fox as autograph hunter #1
- Olive Kirby as autograph hunter #2
- Anders Timberg as Arnold Dench

== Reception ==
The Monthly Film Bulletin wrote: "This is an interesting film, particularly in so much as it offers a welcome if slight variation on the hackneyed theme of love and jealousy behind the scenes. Some artistic sets and skilful direction of the major scenes place it on a level at which it can compare favourably with any film of a similar standard produced in Hollywood. The cast includes a number of leading lights of stage and screen, but whilst the performance of each is adequate, one feels that the roles could have been undertaken with equal success by players of a lesser eminence, since no opportunity is offered the stars in question to demonstrate the particular gift for which he or she has gained well-deserved popularity. In any case, no one has a chance to shine in the presence of Patricia Burke (Betty) whose beauty, poise and polished acting dominate the film."

Kine Weekly wrote: "Highly coloured melodrama of show business, telling how a vaudeville star's infatuation for a worthless society woman nearly wrecks his own life and his comedy horse act. The tale has tremendous possibilities, but, unhappily, David Farrar, who plays the lead, is not entirely equal to its wide emotional demands. Stilted, not to say banal, dialogue also lets it down. Fortunately, its shortcomings do not wholly impair its feminine appeal. A potential woman's picture, it should register on the average double bill."

Variety wrote: "The most unfortunate aspect of this unpretentious adaptation of Pamela Hansford Johnson's novel so far as British audiences are concerned is the complete overshadowing of Bobby Howes, top notch West End stage star, by David Farrar, little known to theatregoers. With due allowance made for the inferiority of the south end of a horse going north it seems a pity to have cast a comedian of Howe's calibre in a role offering nothing but the worst. ...Production values, considerably above average for this type of picture, bring kudos to Louis Jackson. Maclean Rogers' direction for the most part is adequate, but irritating pauses in cross talk between Howes and Farrar need tightening up by better cutting."
