= The Unspeakable Skipton =

1959 comic novel by Pamela Hansford Johnson

- First edition
- Author: Pamela Hansford Johnson
- Language: English
- Genre: Black comedy
- Publisher: Macmillan Publishers
- Publication date: 1959
- Publication place: United Kingdom

The Unspeakable Skipton is a comic novel by the British author Pamela Hansford Johnson, written in 1959.

Johnson first mentioned the idea for the novel in her diary on the last day of 1957. "I wish I could finish my book this year, but have about 2 days' worth to do. Have an idea for another, based on a Corvo-like paranoiac, called 'The Sunken Palace'". In the preface to the novel, Johnson said that anyone familiar with the life of Frederick Rolfe would 'detect' some of her sources. Rolfe was an English writer and eccentric of the late 19th century who also styled himself 'Baron Corvo'. Johnson acknowledged A.J.A. Symons's biography, The Quest for Corvo (1934), as a source for the novel.

Johnson completed the manuscript for the novel in just three weeks. She had decided to change the name to 'Living for Art', before settling on the final title. Johnson's biographer Dierdre David describes the novel as "narrated almost entirely from Skipton's lacerating perspective in a matchless construction of free-indirect-discourse."

== Plot ==
Daniel Skipton is a paranoid novelist living in Bruges who attempts to supplement his measley income by preying on gullible English tourists, taking them to comically bad sex shows, giving them directions to brothels, and trying to sell them dubious Flemish paintings. Meanwhile, Skipton works obsessively on the manuscript for a new novel, which he completed a year before but continues to tinker with using different coloured pens to mark grammatical errors, stylistic changes and marginal comments. He tells himself that "it was not only a great book, it was the greatest novel in the English language, it would make his reputation all over the world and keep him in comfort, more than comfort, for the rest of his life."

Skipton ingratiates himself with a group of British tourists: Cosmo Hines, a London bookseller mostly concerned with visiting a brothel, his wife Dorothy Merlin, a pretentious writer of bad plays, Duncan Moss, a friendly drunk, and Matthew Pryar, a well-dressed gentleman with upper-class connections. Skipton attempts to con the group into paying for his meals while regaling them with his love of Bruges, a love which Hansford Johnson shared.

== Reception ==
Hansford Johnson's publisher, Macmillan, was worried that the character of Dorothy Merlin was based on the eccentric poet Edith Sitwell. Johnson met Sitwell a few weeks later and reported to her publisher that she was nothing like the Dorothy Merlin character. The incident began a friendship between Johnson and Sitwell, who wrote to her about Skipton that "If this is not a great book, then I don't know what greatness is".

The book was reviewed positively, with The Times Literary Supplement, New Statesman and The Spectator praising Johnson's comic craftsmanship. John Metcalf, writing for the Sunday Times, said Johnson's "usual amiable correctness" had been "charged with a new malicious warmth". American reviewers were less enthusiastic, with The New Yorker calling the book "only a highly skilled imitation of a conventional novel".

Time's review stated that "Johnson parodies Rolfe to perfection in all his attributes save one; the mad genius that cut Hadrian the Seventh into one of the diamonds of modern fiction. But she tells her tale waspishly and well, and transports to the canals of Bruges much of the sacred luster and glory that Frederick Rolfe adored in Venice."

Patrick Cruttwell in The Hudson Review called the novel "an exercise in the picaresque" and "a great success" and said that "the whole book, which is kept, as it should be, on the level of caricature and farce, reads as if its author has enjoyed herself making it."

Reviewing David's biography of Johnson, TLS called Skipton "a maliciously witty account of literary skulduggery and lofty pretensions".

Johnson's biography in Britannica notes that "In her novels, starting with The Unspeakable Skipton (1959), she mined a rich vein of satire."

Recommending the book in 2021, Tatler called the novel "An extremely funny story of a rotter at large in Bruges." Philip Hensher, writing on the republication of Johnson's novels in 2018, had a more adverse reaction, calling the book "desultory and repetitious; no inventiveness of language, incident or character sustains forward momentum. A disaster."

Writing in Happily Ever After, Women's Fiction in Post-War Britain, 1945-1960, Niamh Baker commented on the novel that "It isn't surprising that in The Unspeakable Skipton, Pamela Hansford Johnson not only created a successful ugly woman in Dorothy Merlin, but also wrote perceptively about the terror women may feel at the loss of beauty in old age."

Following the publication of the book, Hansford Johnson toured American universities as a lecturer with her husband C.P. Snow, who had become well known in the U.S. for the publication of his Strangers and Brothers series about English academic life, and for his 'Two Cultures' lecture in May 1959.
