= Gordon Neil Stewart =

Australian writer

- Born: 25 June 1912; Melbourne, Australia
- Died: 15 February 1999 (aged 86); Bathurst, New South Wales, Australia
- Occupation: Writer
- Spouses: Pamela Hansford Johnson (m. 1936; div. 1949) Doreen Ellen Coulling (m. 1950)
- Children: 3
- Relatives: Eric Lubbock, 4th Baron Avebury (son-in-law)
- Writing career
- Genres: History, biography, fiction

Gordon Neil Stewart (25 June 1912 – 15 February 1999) was an Australian writer.

== Early life ==
Stewart was born in Melbourne into a wealthy Australian family with pastoral interests in the Bathurst district of New South Wales. He was a great-grandson of Major General William Stewart (1769–1854) Lieutenant Governor of New South Wales from 1825 to 1827. Stewart received a spasmodic education at The Scots College, Sydney due to his parents' frequent travels, but developed a love of reading from long holidays spent in the library of his uncle's house (Abercrombie House) in Bathurst. The family moved to Paris when Stewart was in his late teens, where he attended an English language school and then studied art.

== Career ==
With other members of his family now based in England, Stewart settled in London where he worked from time to time as a journalist and became involved in radical politics. He mixed in literary circles and met Pamela Hansford Johnson and Dylan Thomas. He is said to have been banished from the poetry circle of Victor Neuburg, a former associate of occultist Aleister Crowley, for making jokes about 'yogis and bogeys'.

In 1936, he married Pamela Hansford Johnson (1s 1941, 1d 1944), with whom he collaborated on two thrillers under the name Nap Lombard. When the Second World War broke out he joined the British army and served as an officer in the artillery in India and Burma. After his divorce from Pamela Hansford Johnson, Stewart married Doreen Ellen Coulling in 1950 (1d 1952).

In 1953, he published The Cloak and Dollar War, the first book to be written about the Central Intelligence Agency, described by intelligence scholar Richard J. Aldrich as a revelatory text.

== Later years ==
Stewart returned to Australia in 1955 and worked in Sydney as a journalist for the mining and construction industry. He retired to Bathurst in 1983, where he died on 15 February 1999.

== Bibliography ==
=== Fiction ===
- Tidy Death (1940, Cassell and Co.) as Nap Lombard with Pamela Hansford Johnson
- Murder's a Swine (1943, Hutchinson) as Nap Lombard with Pamela Hansford Johnson
- House of Bondage (1975, Australasian Book Society) ISBN 978-0-909916-67-1
- The Place of Gold (2020, Harry Stewart, Canberra) ISBN 9780648492832 The place of gold.

=== Biography ===
- Blanqui (1939, Victor Gollancz)
- Convict rebel: Ralph Entwistle in "Rebels and Radicals" Edited by Eric Fry (1983, George Allen and Unwin, Sydney) ISBN 978-0-86861-285-0.
- The Claimant: a story of Australia, Scotland and England (2019, Harry Stewart, Canberra) ISBN 9780648492818 The Claimant: a story of Australia, Scotland and England.

=== History ===
- The Fight for the Charter (1937, Chapman and Hall)
- The Cloak and Dollar War (1953, Lawrence and Wishart)

=== Politics ===
- Background to new Hungary (1950, Fore publications, London) as Neil Stewart
- Journey to Hungary (1950, Hungarian news and Information Service, London) as Neil Stewart

=== Edited book ===
- Australian Stories of Horror and Suspense from the Early Days (1978, Australasian Book Society) ISBN 978-0-909916-86-2.
