= The Late Late Show with Craig Ferguson =

American television series

- Title card (2009–2014)
- Also known as: The Late Late Show; Le Late Late Show avec Craig Ferguson à Paris; The Late Late Show with Craig Ferguson in Scotland
- Genre: Late-night talk show; Variety show; Sketch comedy
- Created by: David Letterman; Peter Lassally; Craig Ferguson
- Written by: Jonathan Morano; Ted Mulkerin; Lynn Ferguson; Philip McGrade; Joe O'Brien; Bob Oschack; John Reynolds; Ben Stout; Tom Straw; Joe Strazzulo; Craig Ferguson
- Directed by: Tim Mancinelli; Brian McAloon (2005–2012)
- Presented by: Craig Ferguson; Geoff Peterson (sidekick, voiced by Josh Robert Thompson)
- Announcer: Shadoe Stevens
- Country of origin: United States
- Original language: English
- No. of seasons: 10
- No. of episodes: 2,058 (list of episodes)

Production
- Executive producers: David Letterman; Peter Lassally
- Producer: Michael Naidus
- Production locations: CBS Television City, Los Angeles, California (Note: Seven episodes were filmed in Scotland)
- Camera setup: Multi-camera
- Running time: 39 minutes
- Production companies: Worldwide Pants Incorporated; CBS Television Studios (Note: Credited as CBS Productions (2005–2006) and CBS Paramount Network Television (2006–2009).)

Original release
- Network: CBS
- Release: January 3, 2005 – December 19, 2014

Related
- The Late Late Show with Craig Kilborn; The Late Late Show with James Corden

The Late Late Show with Craig Ferguson is an American late-night talk show hosted by Scottish actor and comedian Craig Ferguson. This was the third iteration of the Late Late Show franchise, airing from January 3, 2005, to December 19, 2014. It followed the Late Show with David Letterman in the CBS late-night lineup, airing weekdays in the United States at 12:37 a.m. Taped in front of a live studio audience from Monday to Thursday (with two episodes taped on Thursdays) at CBS Television City in Los Angeles, California, directly above the Bob Barker Studio (Studio 33), it was produced by David Letterman's production company Worldwide Pants Incorporated and CBS Television Studios.

The Late Late Show franchise had previously aired as The Late Late Show with Tom Snyder, then as The Late Late Show with Craig Kilborn. During the late 2004 transition of guest hosts following Craig Kilborn's departure, Craig Ferguson hosted a series of shows in October and November 2004, culminating in being announced on December 7, 2004, as the pick for new host. After launching The Late Late Show with Craig Ferguson on January 3, 2005, Craig Ferguson achieved the highest ratings since the show's inception in 1995. While quirky comedy was emphasized in the majority of the episodes, Ferguson also addressed difficult subject matters, such as the deaths of his parents, his struggles with alcoholism, and commenting on national tragedies such as the September 11 attacks. Ferguson undertook serious interviews, such as one with Archbishop Desmond Tutu, which earned the show a 2009 Peabody Award.

Ferguson did not have a sidekick until comedian and voice actor Josh Robert Thompson joined the show on April 5, 2010, and voiced Craig's sidekick Geoff Peterson, a robotic human skeleton. Often Geoff is referred to as a "robot skeleton", "gay skeleton robot" or "gay robot skeleton". Geoff is a radio-controlled animatronic robotic puppet skeleton with a metallic Mohawk hairstyle; he was designed and built by Grant Imahara of the TV show MythBusters. Geoff stayed as Craig's sidekick until the show's finale, after which Craig took Geoff home. Once Thompson began voicing Geoff Peterson, the format of the Late Late Show shifted from a more traditional formula (albeit with Ferguson's subversive humor) to a more loose, stripped-down and semi-improvisational comedy style in which Ferguson and Peterson would riff on various topics, often discarding prepared material and going over time limits.

On April 28, 2014, Ferguson announced that he would step down as host at the end of the year. The last episode aired on December 19, 2014. Afterwards, Late Late Show began a series of episodes with guest hosts; then the new permanent host James Corden began his iteration of the franchise on March 23, 2015.

== Show format ==
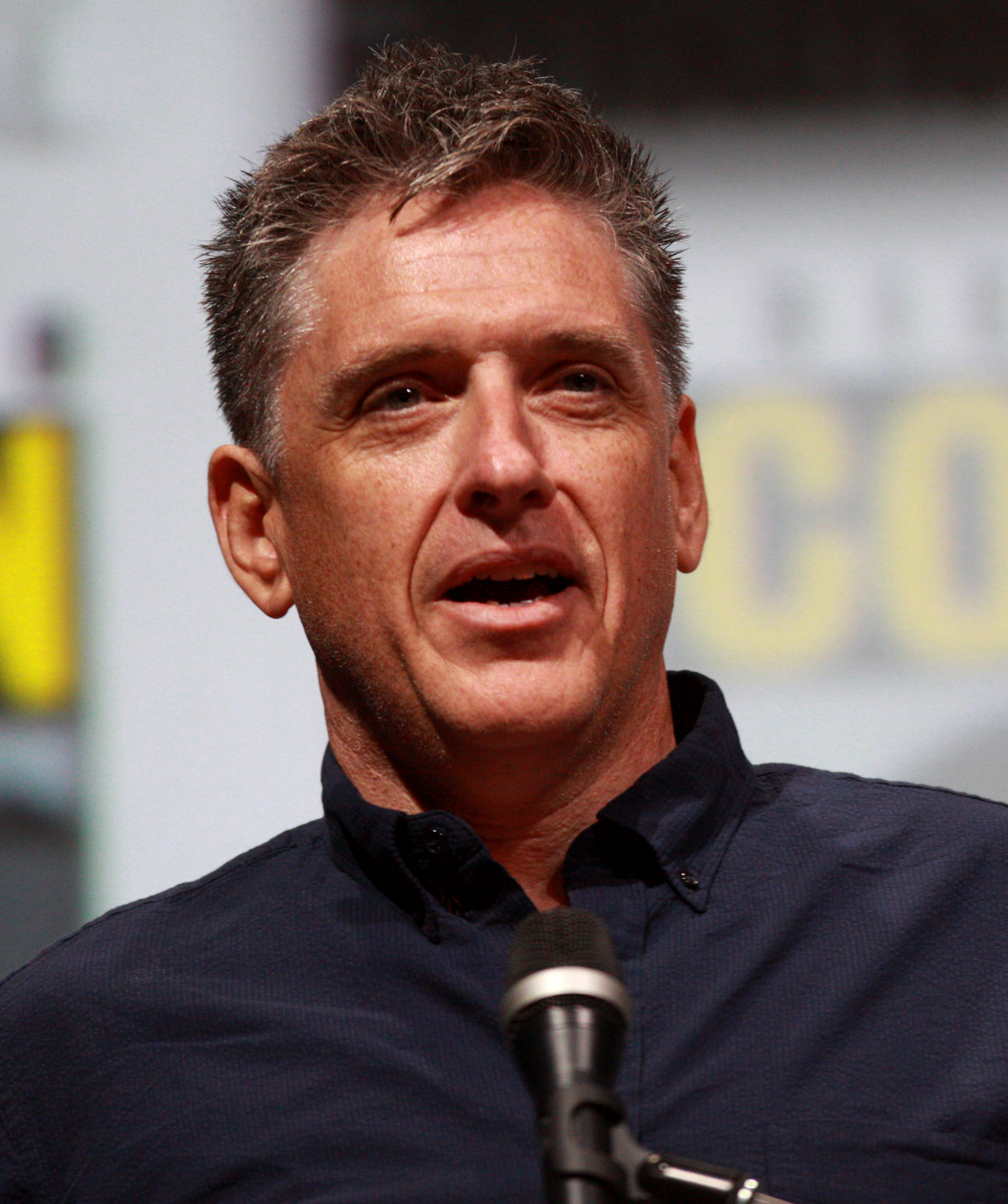
Ferguson in 2013

The show often started with a cold opening that consisted of a short improvised monologue or commentary by Ferguson either as himself or involving his various puppets including Sid the Rabbit. Later openings of the show featured Ferguson talking or fighting with his "Gay Robot Skeleton" sidekick Geoff Peterson (voiced by Josh Robert Thompson), interacting with pantomime horse Secretariat, interrogating members of the studio audience, or presenting a musical number or a pre-taped sketch. The cold open was followed by the opening credits and a commercial break.

Following the break and his introduction by announcer Shadoe Stevens, Ferguson began with "Welcome to Los Angeles, California, welcome to the Late Late Show. I am your host, TV's Craig Ferguson. It's a great day for America, everybody!" as he threw pieces of candy to the audience and hit the side of the camera repeatedly. He then went into a free-form, largely ad-libbed monologue. After another commercial break, Ferguson was often seated behind his desk, where he'd ask Geoff "WHAT TIME IS IT GEOFF PETERSON!?" Mail theme songs then played, usually with the phrase "Ass Mode" in them as well as robots. Then Craig read and responded to viewer emails and (starting in February 2010) tweets from his proclaimed "robot skeleton army".

Generally, one or two celebrities were interviewed. Starting in 2008, Ferguson began each by dramatically ripping up note cards written for the interview, "signalling to the audience, and to the guest, that this conversation need not be rigidly managed". Sometimes, a stand-up comedian, cooking segment, or a musical guest performs, the latter of which was typically pre-taped.

Ferguson had many running gags. These included themed weeks such as "Crab Week", "Magic Week", and "Shark Week"; and the long running "photo of Paul McCartney" joke, wherein Ferguson called for a photo of McCartney that was actually a photo of actress Angela Lansbury and vice versa. The show occasionally used variations of the latter gag featuring other pairs of look-alike celebrities, such as Cher being shown as Marilyn Manson. The show also used short skits such as "Dear Aquaman" (in which Ferguson dressed as the superhero and gave advice), "Michael Caine in Space", and various absurdist Sean Connery impersonations, a not realistic Prince Charles coming in and out of commercial breaks, and longer sketches used more infrequently as the show progressed. Ferguson would often disregard censorship rules and swear, much to the chagrin of producer Michael Naidus; in response, Ferguson would jokingly call Naidus a racist. Profanities from Ferguson and his guests would be bleeped out by world flags and foreign terms.

The show ended with "What Did We Learn on the Show Tonight, Craig?", a segment that started with an animation of an adorable kitten that sometimes got into silly situations, then meowed. Ferguson then removed his tie, put his feet on his desk (or, later on in the series, talked to Geoff or anyone else that showed up). He then summarized the preceding hour of TV. This was first used along with the 2008 set in and was last used in 2014. Later in the series, the show would end with "GP and The Fergs: Epilogue." The kitten then showed up in the bottom-left corner of the screen with a gun in its paws.

== Production milestones ==
Intertitle from the show's original opening credits from 2005 to 2009

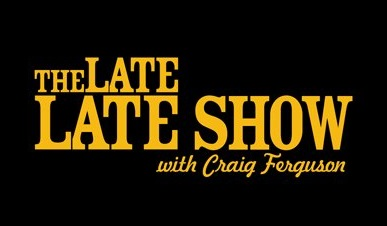
Intertitle used from 2009 until 2014

Ferguson's first show as host was on January 3, 2005. For approximately the first two months, he continued his predecessor's monologue format, reading 5–10 jokes from cue cards. He would ad-lib between the jokes, and soon noticed that the "stuff in-between" got the most reaction from his audience; after that realization, he decided he and his writers would stop writing jokes. By May 2006, Studio 58, the CBS Television City venue from which the show was taped, had been updated with a digital broadcast Solid State Logic mixing console, needed for 5.1 Channel Surround.

A new set debuted on the July 24, 2006, episode. It included a miniature CBS airship that floated along over the backdrop depicting Los Angeles. In the week of March 17, 2008, The Late Late Show debuted a new set featuring a desk interview area on a raised platform; the backdrop was also changed to a detailed representation of Los Angeles. When the 2007–08 Writers Guild of America strike began, the show went into reruns. It resumed production on January 2, 2008, after Worldwide Pants and the WGA came to an agreement.

In 2008, Worldwide Pants Incorporated signed a product placement deal with Ford to promote the Ford Flex during The Late Late Show. Eight episodes ("with one repeat") of the show included custom-written skits in which Ferguson played the leader of a Scottish rap band called The Highlanderz (consisting of Angus "Big Ginger" Ferguson, Philip "The Howler" McGrade, and Shannon "Bubbles" McGee), riding in a Flex as they traveled from Los Angeles International Airport to the CBS Studio. The skits were shown on successive Thursdays starting on September 4.

I think my show is probably closer to Pee-wee's Playhouse than anything else I've seen, and that is an aspiration.

— Craig Ferguson (August 2009)

On August 31, 2009, the show began broadcasting in high definition, featuring a refitted studio and production facilities, along with a new show logo, new lights, an opening title sequence that "features Ferguson in iconic Los Angeles locations", and a new arrangement of the show's theme song. Ferguson's initial contract as host was for six years, until the end of 2010; as of August 2007 he was telling television critics he might not be interested in a contract renewal, though by February 2008, he was publicly professing his loyalty to David Letterman, saying: "I will sit behind Dave as long as he sits there." December 15, 2009, marked his 1,000th episode as host. For the occasion, puppets took over the show; Ferguson conducted the entire show as his puppet Wavy Ranchero, and recurring sketches also featured puppet replacements. Guests, which were not puppets, included Kristen Bell, Maria Bello, and Jason Schwartzman. Jason Segel also made an appearance as his muppet Dracula, performing a musical number with band The Broken West.

On March 31, 2010, the Grady College of Journalism and Mass Communication of the University of Georgia announced that the Late Late Show had won the Peabody Award for Excellence in Television for its "Evening with Archbishop Desmond Tutu" episode. According to the Peabody Board, "the Scottish-born Ferguson has made late-night television safe again for ideas". On April 3, 2012, CBS announced Ferguson agreed to a contract extension through 2014. As part of the deal, CBS would co-produce the show with Worldwide Pants and CBS Television Studios and the show would move to a bigger studio. Although financial terms were not disclosed, the extension likely included a raise beyond what Variety reported had been his US$13 million salary. A new set debuted on August 27, 2012. This was similar to the 2008 set, but the detailed representation of Los Angeles remained the same.

=== Final seasons and departure ===
Geoff Peterson: That's our show—redundant and timely.
Craig Ferguson: I'm redundant, [Geoff's] timely... well, in a way he is. I mean, I represent the redundant form of the late-night stand-up comedian, and he represents impending death [...] you see, there's an allegorical subtext to what we're doing here.

— "What Did We Learn on the Show Tonight Craig?," Late Late Show with Craig Ferguson, 7 February 2012.

Following the departure of Jay Leno from The Tonight Show and the late-night shake-up at NBC, both Late Show and The Late Late Show struggled in the ratings against Jimmy Fallon and his successor at 12:30 a.m. ET/PT, Late Night with Seth Meyers. In April 2014, Letterman announced his plans to retire. CBS passed over Ferguson to choose Stephen Colbert as the new host of Late Show beginning sometime in 2015, reportedly viewing Ferguson as too much of a niche performer to succeed Letterman. Ferguson's contract, which expired in June 2014, stipulated that he was Letterman's successor at 11:30 and that if he was not given the position, he would be paid compensation of as much as US$10,000,000. Letterman's contract included the right to control the time slot that follows his and produce the Late Late Show, and it was his production company (Worldwide Pants) that selected Ferguson as host and with whom his contracts were negotiated. With Letterman's departure, CBS would become the sole producer of the show and it is the network that determines what is done with the time slot and with which any contract is negotiated. CBS had been ambiguous in regard to Ferguson's future as host of The Late Late Show. CBS chief executive Les Moonves said in an interview: "12:30 is up in the air [...] Obviously, we’re considering all sorts of candidates and women are among them. A woman would be great in late night." However, CBS Entertainment chairman Nina Tassler said that the CBS management are "big fans of Craig" and that "Craig is here and doing his show at 12.30am, and we love having him there".

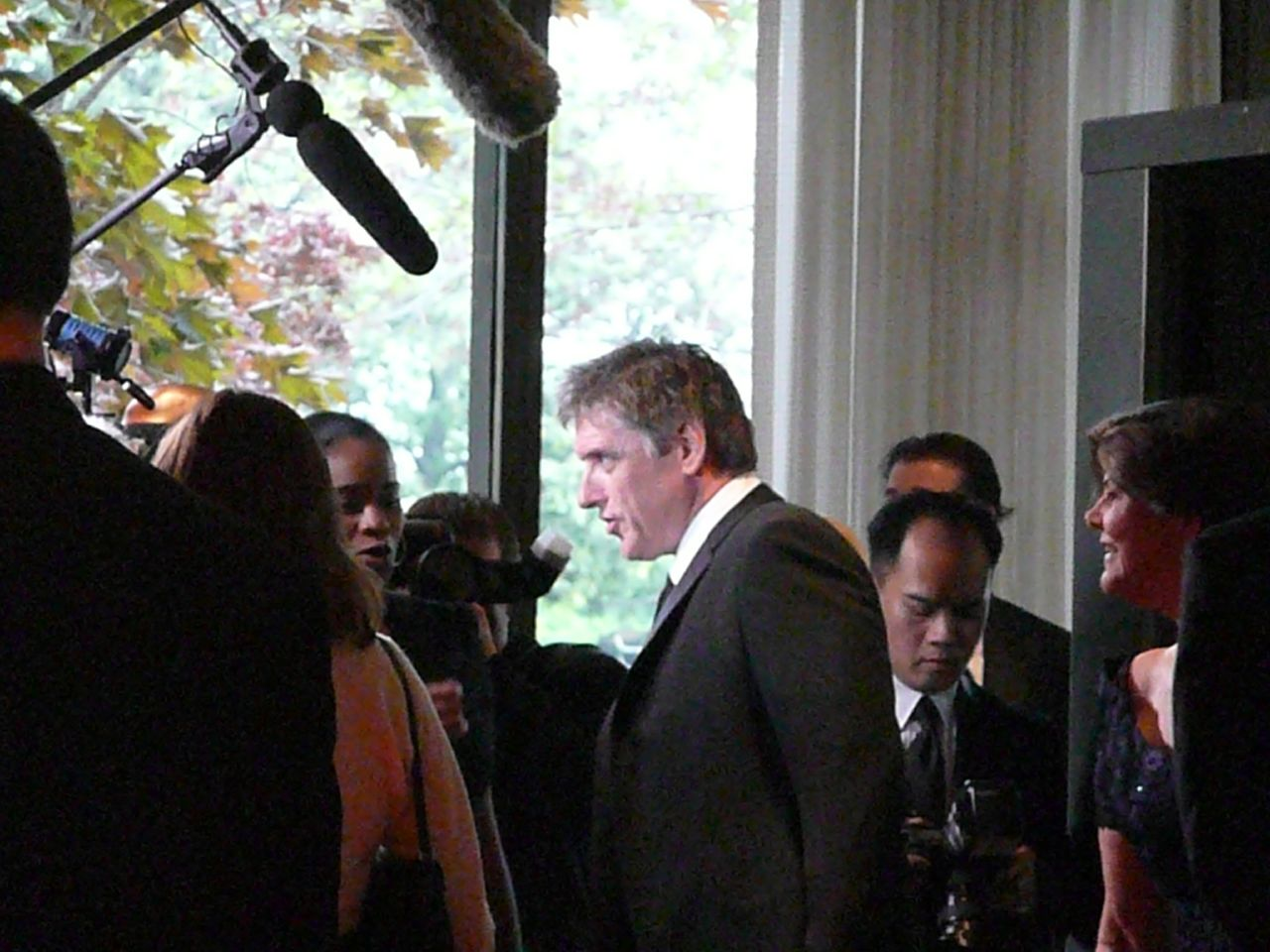
Craig Ferguson at the 94th Annual White House Correspondents' Dinner

Chelsea Handler had reportedly begun negotiations to take over hosting of The Late Late Show when Ferguson's contract expired; however, both Handler and CBS later denied this, saying she was in fact in negotiations with CBS' syndication arm for a daytime show. John Oliver was also reportedly approached by CBS as a possible Late Late Show host prior to his signing a contract with HBO, as were Neil Patrick Harris and James Corden.

On April 28, 2014, Ferguson announced he would leave the show in December 2014. He had made the decision prior to Letterman's announcement but agreed to delay making his own decision public until the reaction to Letterman's decision had died down. (Note: Ferguson in his cold open for the April 28 broadcast noted that it was "my decision to go. This is not Jay [Leno] and Conan [O'Brien] at NBC, this is not Jay and Dave [Letterman] all these years ago, it's not that." Several unofficial uploads of the video are available at YouTube.) He had also originally intended to leave in the summer of 2014 but agreed to stay until the end of the year to give CBS more time to find a successor. In a statement following his announcement, Tassler said that in his decade as host, Ferguson had "infused the broadcast with tremendous energy, unique comedy, insightful interviews, and some of the most heartfelt monologues seen on television". In an interview with Larry King, Ferguson stated that the final episode of The Late Late Show with him as host would air December 19, 2014.

In September 2014, comedian James Corden was announced as host of The Late Late Show with James Corden, beginning in 2015. In November 2014, CBS announced Jay Leno would be Ferguson's guest on his final show; during December "notable friends of the show" scheduled for appearances in December included Kristen Bell, Steve Carell, Jon Hamm, Rashida Jones, Mila Kunis, Thomas Lennon, Tim Meadows (whose 41 appearances set the show's record), Jim Parsons, Michael Sheen, Ariel Tweto, Betty White, and Henry Winkler. Meanwhile, several of Ferguson's final episodes dealt with his distaste for abstract expressionism—Mark Rothko in particular—and public reactions to that stance.

=== Final episode ===
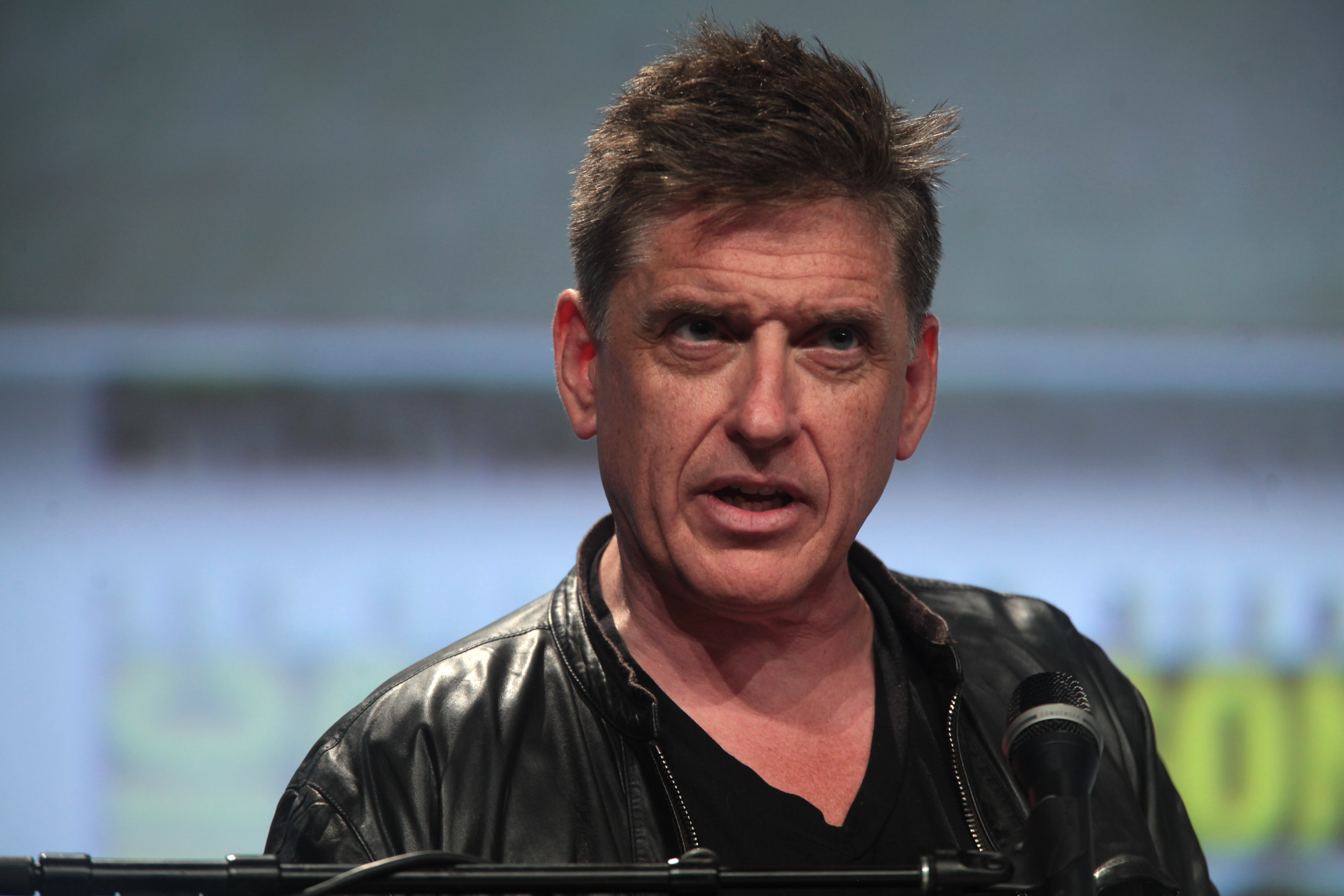
Ferguson at the 2014 San Diego Comic-Con in July, five months prior to his departure from the show

Ferguson's final episode started with the usual cold open, but this time showing a montage of friends from the show while they performed Dead Man Fall's song "Bang Your Drum".

Cameos included: Kevin Bacon, Kristen Bell, Jack Black, Pierce Brosnan, Steve Carell, Don Cheadle, Kristin Chenoweth, Marion Cotillard, Tenacious D, Jeff Daniels, Ted Danson, Kat Dennings, Julia Louis-Dreyfus, Carl Edwards, Cedric the Entertainer, Tony Hale, Jon Hamm, Sean Hayes, Samuel L. Jackson, Rashida Jones, Toby Keith, Jimmy Kimmel, Larry King, Angela Kinsey, Lisa Kudrow, Mila Kunis, Thomas Lennon, Justin Long, Jane Lynch, James Marsden, Matthew McConaughey, Mary McCormack, Joel McHale, Tim Meadows, Metallica, Kunal Nayyar, Geoff Peterson, Regis Philbin, Ray Romano, Bob Saget, Kyra Sedgwick (plus dog Lily), William Shatner, Michael Sheen, Dax Shepard, Quentin Tarantino, Josh Robert Thompson, Archbishop Desmond Tutu, Betty White, Henry Winkler, Shailene Woodley, "Weird Al" Yankovic, and various friends. The pre-taped montage segued to the studio with Ferguson continuing the song backed by the occasional semi-house band Bone Patrol, Sex Pistols guitarist Steve Jones, a full choir, various celebrities, musicians, and friends of the show.

The monologue began with a short time lapse of Craig coming out to start the show through the last 10 years, starting on his first day (January 3, 2005) to his last. Craig thanked his comedic partner Josh Robert Thompson, the viewers, the crew, and explained:

Over the years, going with this show out and around, or going and doing stand-up with Josh, I've come into contact with a lot of people who are viewers of this show, and although I said my goodbyes to the crew, the people who made this show are you. You came to a show that, let's be honest, was a bit of a fixer-upper. It kind of stayed that way, but what I hope we've done [...] maybe art is a very grand word, but I think what we managed to do here is make something that wasn't here before. So in that sense maybe it is a piece of art, it didn't exist and now it does. What we've done here, it doesn't go away because I stopped doing it, we stop doing this and we start doing something else [...] maybe [...] later, or maybe I go away and this is it! But I think what was more overwhelming than anything else in the experience of doing this show was making a connection with a country that I became a part of, which is astonishing to me. Even in the course of this show I became an American, officially and particularly for my friends at the IRS, I am now a fully-fledged American. However, what I can't be is a member of a club, which I didn't really ask to join, I wanted to do this show [...] and now we've done this show, and if you will indulge me in whatever I'm doing now and come to whatever I do next I'd be very grateful, because my kids are still young.

After reading his last Tweets & emails and doing his final interview with guest Jay Leno, the show ended with his final segment: What Did We Learn on the Show Over the Last 10 Years, Craig? Craig tells Geoff he wants to finally find out who the real identity of Secretariat is. Asked to lift up his mask, it's revealed to be Bob Newhart. Craig asks, "Bob Newhart?! What are you doing here?" to which Newhart replies, "Hey, guy, it's your dream." Craig wakes up next to Drew Carey as Nigel Wick and proceeds to spoof the finales of Newhart (the show was all a dream), St. Elsewhere (he imagined it all from a snowglobe), and The Sopranos (cut to black with Journey's "Don't Stop Believin'").

== Show elements ==
=== Cold open ===
Most nights, he introduces himself as "TV's Craig Ferguson" and pronounces it a "great day for America." After that, no one knows what might come next, not even the host himself.

— TV Critic Eric Deggans of the St Petersburg Times

Ferguson starts with a cold open, which is a two-minute segment before the first commercials, theme song, and actual show. Originally, it was a miniature monologue and to talk about the guests on the show. Over time, this segment expanded to include short skits and musical sessions often involving puppets, and occasional interaction with members of the studio audience. In actual practice, the cold open was the second segment presented when the show was recorded at the CBS studios. The open was actually recorded after the monologue but aired before it, something Ferguson originally thinly disguised, but later openly mocked.

On November 22, 2010, Ferguson opened the show with evidence that a French talk show called Ce Soir Avec Arthur had stolen his show's opening sequence, as well as some of his puppet and song-and-dance concepts. On November 29, 2010, Ferguson introduced Arthur in the cold opening of the show; they joked back and forth for about two minutes, and then Arthur returned to help Ferguson answer viewer emails and again at the end of the show.

=== Theme song ===
When he was hired as the full-time replacement for Craig Kilborn, Ferguson co-wrote and recorded a theme song. The theme tune was re-recorded for the show's switch to HD, premiering on August 31, 2009, and produced by Andy "Stoker" Growcott. Except for when the show traveled (i.e. Paris, Scotland, New Orleans), the lyrics to this theme were the same during the entire 10-year run.

=== Sidekicks ===
==== Geoff Peterson ====
Geoff Peterson (left) and Sandra the Rhino (centre) as they appeared on the show, with Ferguson (right)

On April 5, 2010, Ferguson began featuring a robot skeleton sidekick, Geoff Peterson, voiced by Josh Robert Thompson. The robot was created by former MythBuster Grant Imahara. According to a web article by Jeremy Kaplan, when Imahara became aware of Ferguson's idea to have a robot sidekick, he responded with a March 1, 2010, tweet:

@CraigyFerg I hear you are looking for a robot sidekick. I think I can help... for a price: get me 100,000 [Twitter followers]. If you can.

Ferguson subsequently came through with the followers and Imahara came through with the robot.

While Geoff began with pre-recorded phrases, Thompson voiced him live in studio for almost every episode since late June 2011, including those filmed in Paris and Scotland. Three people are often given screen credit at the end of the show as being responsible for Geoff: Imahara, writer Tom Straw (and later Bob Oschack), and voice actor Thompson.

Ferguson has said that the robot is "my metaphor for deconstructing the dead art form of the late night talk show", and that he selected the name because of its commonness. Ferguson has jokingly referred to Geoff as an "appliance" who is being used because the show's small budget does not permit a typical (and living) sidekick or band. But as the years progressed, mainly due to Thompson's performance, even Ferguson would admit that Geoff Peterson came to fully embody the very sidekick cliché that they intended to mock.

Geoff has a running "feud" with recurring guest Kristen Bell, who claims that she had wanted to be Craig's sidekick and was upset when Geoff was selected.

==== Secretariat ====
Secretariat first featured on The Late Late Show in October 2010, and continued to feature until the final episode in December 2014

Secretariat is a pantomime horse which first appeared on October 11, 2010, as a joke reference to the Disney film Secretariat which was based on the life of the 1973 triple-crown winning racehorse, Secretariat. The people playing Secretariat were Joseph Bolter and Ryan McGowan. The two were interns at the show, and the costume was originally rented. Ferguson said that the idea for Secretariat came from Christmastime British pantomime theater performances, and it was used because the show had a limited budget.

Secretariat's appearances on the show would begin through a doorbell ring, which Ferguson would press at random moments in the show, even in the middle of an interview. Ferguson would ask, "Who's that at the door?," prompting Secretariat to enter and dance around the stage accompanied by techno music, with Ferguson, the guest, and the audience standing up to dance with him. Secretariat would initially leave through where he entered, but later episodes would show him proceeding to his "stall" at the right-hand side of the stage. By December 2010, he had become a regular on the show, and Secretariat would often appear even if unprompted, such as the cold opens or when talked to from his stall. Sometimes, Secretariat would be provoked by Ferguson or a Tweets & Email submission, causing him to angrily kick his stall open; Geoff would jokingly aggravate the situation by saying, "Kick his ass, man!," though he varies in rooting for either Ferguson or Secretariat.

Secretariat has appeared in some sketches, including one on January 7, 2011, when a clip was shown of Secretariat traveling to New York City to deliver a Christmas present to Jimmy Fallon, who competed against Ferguson in the same time slot on NBC. In the clip, Secretariat makes appearances on other New York-based CBS programs such as Live with Regis and Kelly, The View, CBS News (where Katie Couric did the Secretariat Dance), and Late Show with David Letterman. When Ferguson hosted the show from Paris during the week of August 1, 2011, Secretariat played a role in several locations. He again accompanied the show during its week of programs taped in Scotland, airing in the summer of 2012. Secretariat also appeared in several background shots of ESPN remote shows during the show's visit to New Orleans for Super Bowl XLVII in 2013.

A following has been built around the false horse, with multiple fan pages existing on Facebook, and several websites selling Team Secretariat T-shirts. As part of the finale's last sketch, Secretariat unmasks himself and reveals himself to be Bob Newhart.

==== Sandra the Rhino ====
Voiced by Dana DeLorenzo, Sandra is a rhino head mounted above the studio's faux fireplace.

==== Beth the CBS Executive ====
Throughout 2012, DeLorenzo played a television executive monitoring the show.

==== Alfredo Sauce and the Shy Fellas ====
Over the course of his run as host, Ferguson wished to have a house band. As a substitute, Alfredo Sauce and the Shy Fellas were created, billed as "the Shyest Band in Late Night." Said to be hiding behind the curtain covering the studio bandstand, in reality Alfredo Sauce and the other band members were voiced by Thompson and their musical cues were stock recordings. Though the characters' faces were never shown, Alfredo Sauce's hand (an oversized prop) made an appearance in one episode when it reached out from behind the curtain.

=== Impersonations and characters ===
Impersonations and sketch characters frequently done by Ferguson on the show include Prince Charles (usually hosting "The Rather Late Programme"), Wilford Brimley, Sean Connery, Bill Clinton, Queen Elizabeth II, Andy Rooney, Aquaman, Michael Caine, David Bowie, Elton John, Bono, and Mitt Romney. He claims that he developed his imitation of Caine after an eight-hour-long plane ride on which he sat behind Caine, who "gabbed" with his wife the entire trip.

Less frequent impersonations include Dr. Phil, Simon Cowell, Kim Jong-il, Mick Jagger, Morgan Freeman, Regis Philbin, Angela Lansbury (as "Jessica Fletcher" on Murder, She Wrote), Jay Leno, Jimmy Fallon, Larry King ("of the Jungle"), Arnold Schwarzenegger, and J. K. Rowling.

=== Puppets ===
Beginning in 2008, the show began incorporating puppets in the cold open; many were given to Ferguson by Folkmanis Puppets. Ferguson stated in an interview with Playboy magazine that the impetus behind starting to do the puppets is hearing an episode of Jonesy's Jukebox during his drive in to work where "The Lonely Goatherd" was played. Upon arriving he decided to lip synch the song on air that night using some hand puppets that were already on hand. The cloth puppets were phased out of the series after its move to a new studio in the fall of 2012, and were not featured in the show's opening that premiered in September 2013, but marionettes of Drew Carey and Morgan Freeman were used frequently in cold opens during the fall of 2013.

Puppets used on air:

- Sandra Biggerstaff: An adorable male giraffe that is a representative for BP.
- Sid: A cute, yet vulgar white rabbit, with a North London accent.
- Wavy Rancheros: A crocodile with a Cajun accent prone to waving his left hand at the audience (hence his name), Wavy "hosted" the show's 1,000th episode.
- The Pig/Gustave Flaubert: Used during the initial outbreak of swine flu, a pig with sideburns and a tuft of hair who has a "contempt for the bourgeoisie".
- Kronos: A monkey who wears a bellhop's uniform and claims to be from another planet.
- Brian: A shark with a wonderful singing voice.
- Punxsutawney Phil: A groundhog that speaks in a German accent.
- Sebastian Trousers: A wolf objecting to the portrayals of wolves in the movies.
- George: A slow talking French snail.
- Craig Ferguson: A highly satirized version of the host, with a giant Liza Minnelli cut-out for the head. Voiced by Josh Robert Thompson in scenes with Craig portraying Tiny Drew Carey
- Evangeline: A female ferret with a deep, male voice who is on steroids in preparation for the Olympics.
- Sandra Peterson, a remote-controlled rhino head that hangs over the fireplace; originally voiced by Dana DeLorenzo (who also portrayed "Beth", a bespectacled "CBS executive"), Sandra "returned" in 2014, voiced and operated by Josh Robert Thompson (Note: The character's return occurred during a Tweets and E-mails segment in January. Unofficial videos have been uploaded to YouTube.)
- Tiny Drew Carey: A small marionette of Drew Carey (though the body and head reflect Carey before his weight loss in 2010). A miniature desk is sometimes featured for Tiny Drew Carey to "sit" behind.
- Morgan Freeman: A large Morgan Freeman marionette who usually interacts with Tiny Drew Carey; voiced by Josh Robert Thompson.
- In one episode, Lauren Graham operated Nadine, a cat puppet, which appeared to have a romantic relationship with Wavy.

=== Musical performances ===
The Late Late Show taped musical performances separately from the rest of the show. For example, the noise rock band No Age was videotaped on October 2, 2008, for an appearance scheduled to air October 27. That performance was also the subject of an equal-time rule controversy in which guitarist Randy Randall was not allowed to wear a pro-Barack Obama T-shirt. Randall, not wanting to cancel the appearance, chose instead to turn the T-shirt inside out.

=== Interview ending activities ===
Starting in 2010, Ferguson began ending interviews by variously offering the guest a choice between two or three activities. These have included:

- Mouth Organ: Ferguson and the guest play the mouth organ (harmonica) briefly. Guests that can play the instrument properly are awarded the Golden Mouth Organ.‡
- Awkward Pause: Ferguson and the guest act out an awkward pause together. Occasionally Ferguson and the guest would agree on a particular subtext for the awkward pause, for instance 'sexual tension awkward pause' or 'smell my finger awkward pause'.
- Big Cash Prize: Ferguson will offer the guest $7.50 in nickels for either answering a question (which always start with factoids about Iceland's capital city), or guessing 'What's in My Box?', an imaginary box that only Geoff knows the contents of. Prior to August 27, 2012, the prize was $50 in $1 bills or in quarters. Ferguson explained that the reduced prize was necessary to help pay for the new studio. During episodes taped in Scotland, the prize was awarded in pounds sterling.
- Fruit: Ferguson asks the guest if they would like a piece of fruit, selected from a basket on the desk containing tropical fruit such as mangoes, cherimoyas, and other exotic offerings. When a coconut is chosen, Ferguson proceeds to smash it open on his desk and drink the coconut milk with the guest.
- Throw Frisbees at the Horse: Ferguson and the guest attempt to hit Secretariat with frisbees.
- Guess What Her Majesty The Queen Is Thinking: A variation of the Big Cash Prize, Ferguson states that they have imagined a scenario where her majesty the queen has been wrongly imprisoned, and the guest must guess what she is thinking. He then proceeds to impersonate the queen and tell whether or not they were correct.
- True or Not True?: Another variation of the Big Cash Prize, where Ferguson utters a short story (of any matter) and the guest has to decide if it's true or not true. As with "What's in My Box", the real answer is only known to Geoff Peterson.
- Touch My Glittery Ball: The guest is encouraged to touch a small, spinning disco ball on Ferguson's desk. By mid-October 2011 Ferguson had only occasionally offered this option.
- Haggis in a TARDIS/Touch My Haggis: the guest is offered the option to touch a vegetarian haggis, supplied by Neil Gaiman, which has been stuffed into the model TARDIS which sits on Craig's desk.
- Freeze-frame High Five: Craig and guest high-five and keep pose. Only used a few times before being phased out.

Golden Mouth Organ winners	Date	Reference
Billy Connolly	December 17, 2010	
David Pogue	February 3, 2011	
Jennifer Ouellette	February 11, 2011	
Hugh Laurie	March 2, 2011	
Neil Patrick Harris	March 3, 2011	
Larry Scotsman Johnson (Audience member)	March 31, 2011	
Kevin Bacon	June 10, 2011	
Zooey Deschanel	July 14, 2011	
Jim Cummings	July 14, 2011	
John Goodman	July 22, 2011	
Jayma Mays	July 22, 2011	
William H. Macy	July 26, 2011	
Ewan McGregor	November 15, 2011	
Wilford Brimley	November 23, 2011	
Eric Idle	February 27, 2012	
Dr. Mehmet Oz	February 28, 2012	
Phil Plait	February 29, 2012	
Steven Tyler	May 9, 2012	
Andy García	June 13, 2012	
David Robinson (Audience member)	August 1, 2012	
Adam Savage	August 1, 2012	
Tom Hanks	November 30, 2012	

== Ratings ==
In 2006, clips of The Late Late Show began appearing on the video sharing website YouTube. Subsequently, Ferguson's ratings "grew seven percent (or by 100,000 viewers)."

During the week ending March 31, 2006, The Late Late Show attracted an average of 1.9 million total viewers, a number that increased to 2.0 million a year later.

During the week ending April 4, 2008, The Late Late Show attracted an average of 1.88 million total viewers; that week, for the first time since Ferguson began hosting, the show's "five-night week of original head-to-head broadcasts", which was later discovered to actually be four nights due to a difference in title, drew a larger audience than Late Night with Conan O'Brien. Reuters noted that "Ferguson's bigger accomplishment seems to be that he has merely lost fewer viewers this season, with his total audience slipping 12% from a year ago, compared with a 24% drop for O'Brien"; the year-to-year decline in viewership was attributed to the 2007–2008 Writers Guild of America strike.

The Late Late Show with Craig Ferguson encountered new competition in March 2009, the first night of Late Night with Jimmy Fallon. During Fallon's first week, the new show averaged 2.4 million viewers, a half million more viewers than Ferguson's show. Fallon maintained his lead over Ferguson during the show's second week, but by March 16, The Late Late Show had attracted a larger audience. In July 2009, Ferguson led Late Night in total viewers by a 25% margin. On September 22, 2009, the night Ferguson followed the Letterman interview of President Obama, his audience reached 3.24 million, the show's biggest ever; Ferguson attracted two million viewers more than Jimmy Fallon and almost a million more than Conan O'Brien attracted an hour earlier. By the end of 2009, The Late Late Show topped Late Night with Jimmy Fallon in the ratings with a 1.8 rating/6 share and 1.6 rating/6 share, respectively.

By May 2010, Late Late Show and Late Night were roughly tied in the ratings, with Ferguson leading in total viewers (1.7 million compared to 1.6 million for Fallon) and Fallon having a narrow edge in ratings.

During November sweeps in 2011, The Late Late Show was third in late-late night broadcasting; its 1.7 million views were well ahead of Last Call with Carson Daly but behind the 2 million viewers of Jimmy Kimmel Live! and the 1.8 million viewers of Late Night with Jimmy Fallon.

The 2012 November sweeps saw Jimmy Kimmel Live! edge ahead of Late Night with Jimmy Fallon and The Late Late Show with 2.1 million total viewers, compared to Fallon's 1.75 million and Ferguson's 1.6 million.

== Notable episodes ==
Ferguson interviews Archbishop Desmond Tutu in 2009. The broadcast subsequently saw Ferguson awarded a Peabody Award

On January 3, 2005, Ferguson hosted his first episode, with first guests David Duchovny, and Nicole Sullivan, and on January 30, 2006, Ferguson eulogized his father, who had died the day before. He was nominated for his first Emmy Award for the episode. On February 19, 2007, Ferguson announced he would do "no Britney Spears jokes", saying "comedy should have a certain amount of joy in it" and that it shouldn't include "attacking the vulnerable." He referenced his 15 years of sobriety and the struggle he had with addiction, almost ending in suicide. Despite Ferguson's initial trepidation over how the monologue would be received, it earned widespread support from both industry peers and viewers, and it has resurfaced on the internet several times since its broadcast in relation to Britney Spears' subsequent media attention. On September 10, 2008, he described his excitement about voting in his first U.S. Presidential election and ranted against American voter fatigue, stating, "If you don't vote, you're a moron!"

On March 4, 2009, he dedicated the entire show to his guest, Archbishop Desmond Tutu. The cold open and monologue featured a brief history of South Africa and apartheid. The show was during a week of change in late night, with the premiere of Late Night with Jimmy Fallon, a show competing with The Late Late Show, occurring two days earlier. The interview received critical praise from NPR's TV critic, David Bianculli, who called the episode's monologue "nothing less than an entertaining, understandable, shockingly thorough history of South African politics and colonization" and its interview "inspirational [...] almost beyond measure." This show was given a Peabody Award March 31, 2010, for broadcasting excellence in news and entertainment. On October 27, 2009, during an interview with Alicia Silverstone, CBS lost power due to abnormally high gusts of wind in the area, with Ferguson joking that "We've gone to radio, everybody!" before going to a commercial break. The power "returned" before the interview with Salman Rushdie (the interview was pretaped), only to "go out" again during the "What did we learn on the show tonight, Craig?" segment. The next night, he commented in the cold opening that Wolf Blitzer reported on CNN that the lights went out on the show, "but how can that be news?"

The episode on December 15, 2009, was the 1,000th of Ferguson's tenure as host, and to mark the occasion, the entire show was done with puppets. "Wavy Ranchero" "filled in" as host, delivering a brief monologue and interviewing the celebrity guests, the shark puppet was used for the "Dear Aquaman" skits, and "Connery the Bull" appeared in the "A Sean Connery Holiday Memory" skits. Jason Segel appeared with a Dracula puppet, performing the song "Dracula's Lament" from his film Forgetting Sarah Marshall, accompanied by The Broken West. The only time Ferguson himself appeared on camera (aside from the opening title sequence and the "Dear Aquaman" intro) was during the closing segment in which he was on stage in his Prince Charles costume, along with many of his puppets and crew members, while Wavy "performed" to James Taylor's recording of Carole King's "You've Got a Friend". Ferguson was also seen during the closing credits which showed various captioned shots of behind-the-scenes action that took place during the episode's production. On January 14, 2010, Ferguson said in the cold open that he would not talk about "the trouble at late night" at NBC, because there was an actual news story about the earthquake in Haiti. Commenting on Rush Limbaugh's statement "We already donated to Haiti, it's called U.S. Income Tax", he said "Rush Limbaugh has to fill a lot of air time with saying things and occasionally saying garbage, and God knows I do that every night here." He told Limbaugh that the way to take the sting out of his statement was to donate a million dollars of his money to the Red Cross "and we'll say no more about it."

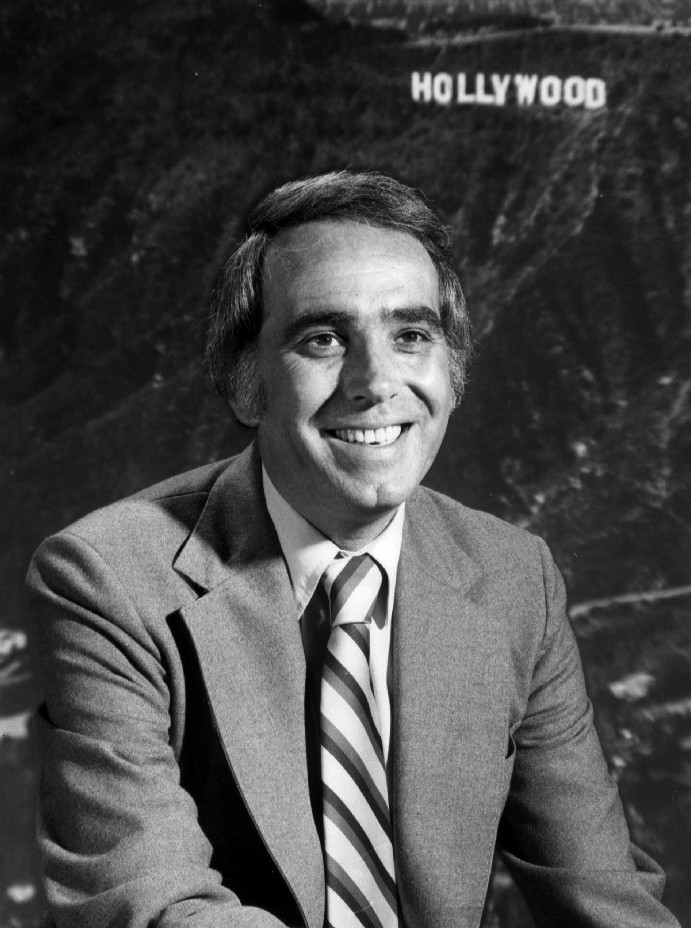
On 23 February 2010, Ferguson conducted an "experiment" by carrying out only one interview (with Stephen Fry) and with no studio audience, a format which had been used by the inaugural host of The Late Late Show Tom Snyder (pictured)

On February 23, 2010, Ferguson did a show with a single guest (Stephen Fry) and without a studio audience, a format in part inspired by Tom Snyder, who had hosted Tomorrow and the first five years of The Late Late Show in such a format. According to Ferguson, the Tonight Show host and time slot conflict got him to reflect on the "late-night traditions started by Steve Allen, Jack Paar, Johnny Carson, and 'lovingly deconstructed' by David Letterman" and prompted him to try such an experiment. Ferguson's guest for the hour was Stephen Fry. On April 5, 2010, the show introduced Geoff Peterson, Craig's robot skeleton sidekick. Previously, Craig had professed his desire to have his own "Robot Skeleton Army". To that end, MythBusters' Grant Imahara volunteered to build Craig a robot skeleton sidekick if Craig got him 100,000 followers on Twitter. Originally, Craig provided the voice of Geoff, using a harsh, metallic voice in several short, pre-recorded phrases. Later that month, Josh Robert Thompson began providing Geoff's voice full-time. By mid 2011, Thompson would perform Geoff live in the studio. On November 16, 2010, Ferguson dedicated an entire episode to the British science fiction program Doctor Who, complete with a Dalek and guest Matt Smith. The cold open was marred when a rehearsed dance number was forced to be scrapped due to CBS not receiving legal clearance to play the Doctor Who theme song five minutes before air, much to the anger of Ferguson. The dance number later leaked on YouTube on December 1. Ferguson announced on January 3, 2011, that the dance number had finally been cleared to be shown and that it would air on the upcoming show which Alex Kingston (who plays "River Song" on Doctor Who) would guest on.

On February 1, 2011, the show was dedicated to an examination of African-American history and culture in honor of February being Black History Month in the United States. Ferguson stated at the top of the show that as a recent immigrant to the country he was not very knowledgeable about the topic and would use that night's episode to educate himself. He also declared at the top of the show that there would be "no skeleton" and "no horse" during that night's taping (in reference to Geoff Peterson and Secretariat). His guests that night were Cornel West and George Clinton, who also performed "One Nation Under a Groove" with his band Parliament-Funkadelic. In June 2011, Ferguson filmed an entire week of shows in Paris, France, featuring Kristen Bell as co-host. The episodes aired during the week of August 1. Ferguson joked, "It's the first time in the history of this show that we've been allowed outside." For this week of shows, the program was temporarily re-titled Le Late Late Show avec Craig Ferguson à Paris, and Ferguson sang the show's theme song on-camera with help from two Parisian musicians: one playing a piano, the other a double bass. On August 23, 2011, Ferguson received a white substance in the mail that was feared to be anthrax. Many people were held in isolation after being exposed to the substance, but they were released after the police discovered that the powdery substance was benign. Ferguson joked about the incident on his show, explaining, "Today someone sent an envelope packed with white powder to the show. I offered to taste it, but they said 'no'".

International locations The Late Late Show broadcast from

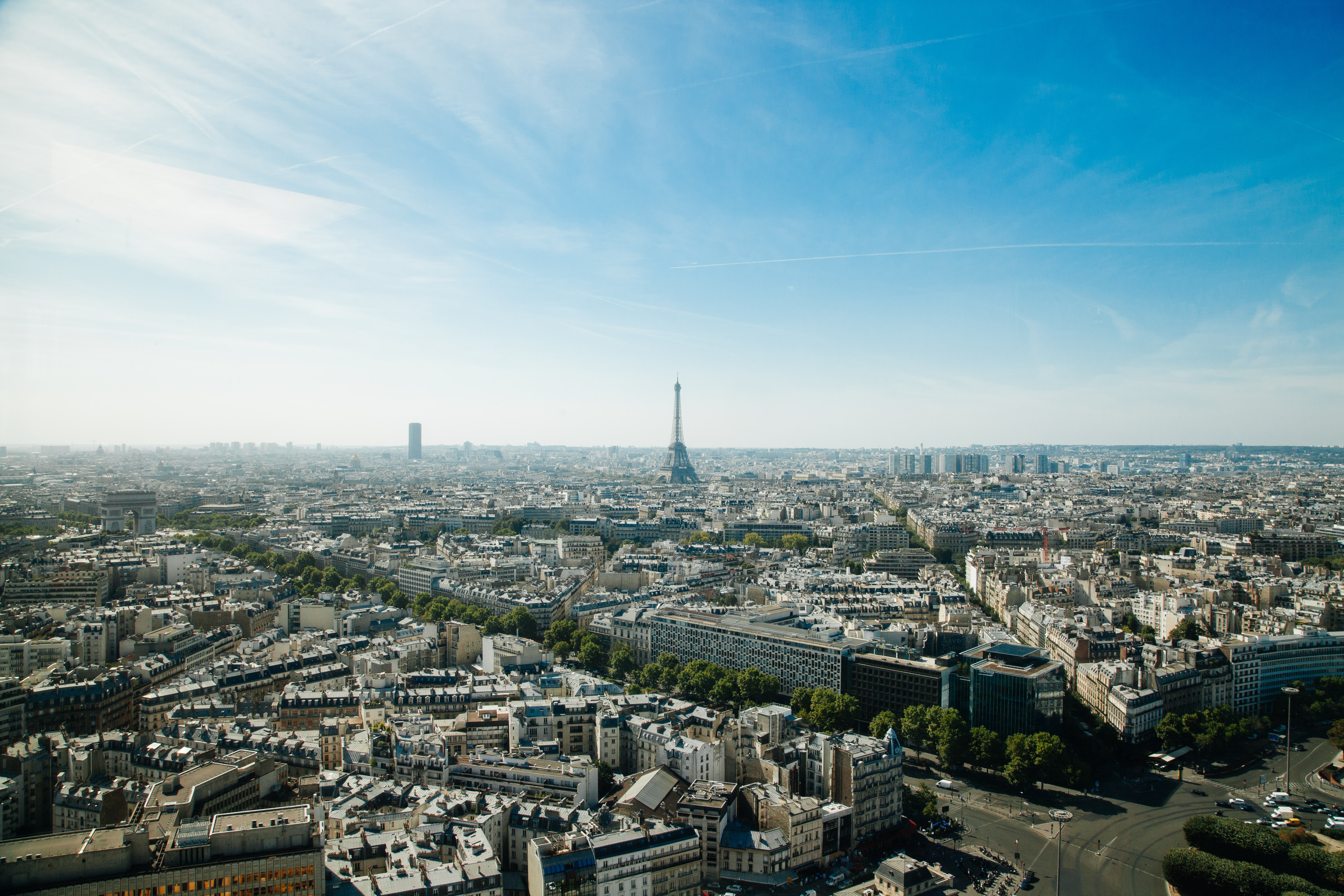
Paris, the capital of France (2011)

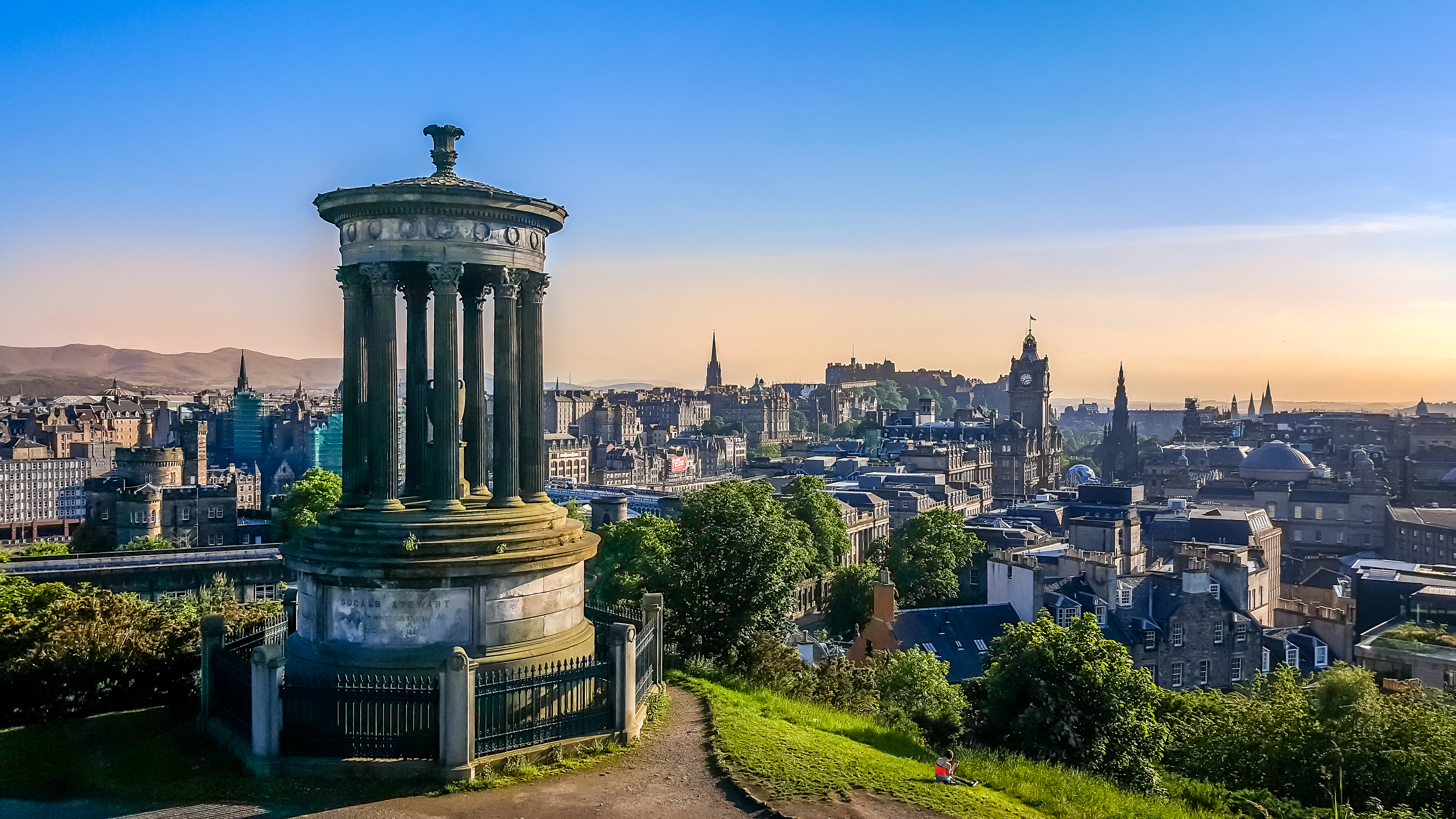
Edinburgh, the capital of Scotland (2012)

During the week of May 14 2012, Ferguson travelled to his native Scotland to film the show and filmed in locations including his hometown Cumbernauld, as well as Arbroath, Edinburgh and Glasgow. During the week the show was broadcast from Scotland, it was renamed The Late Late Show with Craig Ferguson in Scotland. On June 28, 2012, the show's lights lost power after a transformer blew, shorting out the light grid above the stage. This forced the crew to carry on with the show with the dimly-lit set. On April 15, 2013, the show following the Boston Marathon bombing began with Ferguson, seated at his desk, talking to the audience about the bombing, his feelings about them, his personal relationship with the city of Boston, and the lack of a proper open and monologue for the show, stating that it would be "insensitive, at best" to open the show with "It's a great day for America." He also explained the bombing might come up again during the show, saying, "This is on my mind; I can't pretend it's not there." Along with the monologue, the show omitted the opening sequence, the usual "Tweets & Email" segment (going straight into the first interview following the first commercial), and the usual "What Did We Learn on the Show Tonight, Craig?" segment at the end of the show. Geoff Peterson and Secretariat were also absent. During the show, Ferguson talked briefly about the bombing to his guests, Rob Lowe and Larry King. To end the show, Ferguson addressed his audience in Boston, saying, "Our thoughts are with you, and we'll see how it goes. Good luck to you." Time magazine later placed Ferguson's monologue at number one on its list of the Top 10 Late Night Moments of 2013. On April Fools' Day in 2014, The Late Late Show with Craig Ferguson featured a swap of cast between the show and The Price Is Right; Craig, Shadoe, and the cast did that day's episode of Price, while Drew Carey hosted The Late Late Show with George Gray working as announcer. On September 19, 2014, The Late Late Show with Craig Ferguson aired its 2,000th episode.

On December 19, 2014, The Late Late Show with Craig Ferguson aired its final episode, with Jay Leno as the featured guest. In the cold open, Ferguson performed Dead Man Fall's song "Bang Your Drum" accompanied by Kevin Bacon, Kyra Sedgwick (plus dog Lily), Jack Black, Kristen Bell, Pierce Brosnan, Steve Carell, Don Cheadle, Kristin Chenoweth, Marion Cotillard, Tenacious D, Jeff Daniels, Ted Danson, Kat Dennings, Julia Louis-Dreyfus, Carl Edwards, Cedric the Entertainer, Tony Hale, Jon Hamm, Sean Hayes, Samuel L. Jackson, Rashida Jones, Toby Keith, Jimmy Kimmel, Mila Kunis, Lisa Kudrow, Jane Lynch, Justin Long, James Marsden, Matthew McConaughey, Mary McCormack, Joel McHale, Tim Meadows, Metallica, Kunal Nayyar, Geoff Peterson, Regis Philbin, Ray Romano, Bob Saget, William Shatner, Michael Sheen, Quentin Tarantino, Josh Robert Thompson, Archbishop Desmond Tutu, Henry Winkler, Shailene Woodley, "Weird Al" Yankovic, Larry King, Angela Kinsey, Betty White, Thomas Lennon, Secretariat, and Ferguson's bunny and alligator puppets in a pre-taped montage which segued to the song continuing live in studio with Ferguson singing backed by occasional semi-house band Bone Patrol, Sex Pistols guitarist Steve Jones and a choir and various celebrities, musicians and friends of the show accompanying on stage. The What Did We Learn segment at the end of the show revealed Secretariat, the pantomime horse, to be Bob Newhart, at which point the segment became a parody of the Newhart series finale with Ferguson as Mr. Wick from The Drew Carey Show waking up from a bad dream, in bed with Drew Carey revealing the 10 years of The Late Late Show with Craig Ferguson to have been a dream. References to the series finales of St. Elsewhere and The Sopranos were also made.

== International broadcast ==
The Late Late Show with Craig Ferguson aired in Australia on Eleven, first premiering on January 11, 2011.

In Canada, the series aired on CHCH, Global, and Omni Television.

== See also ==
- Late Show with David Letterman
- The Late Late Show with James Corden
- Celebrity Name Game
- Join or Die with Craig Ferguson
- The Craig Ferguson Show
- List of late-night network TV programs
