= Josh Robert Thompson =

American actor (born 1975)

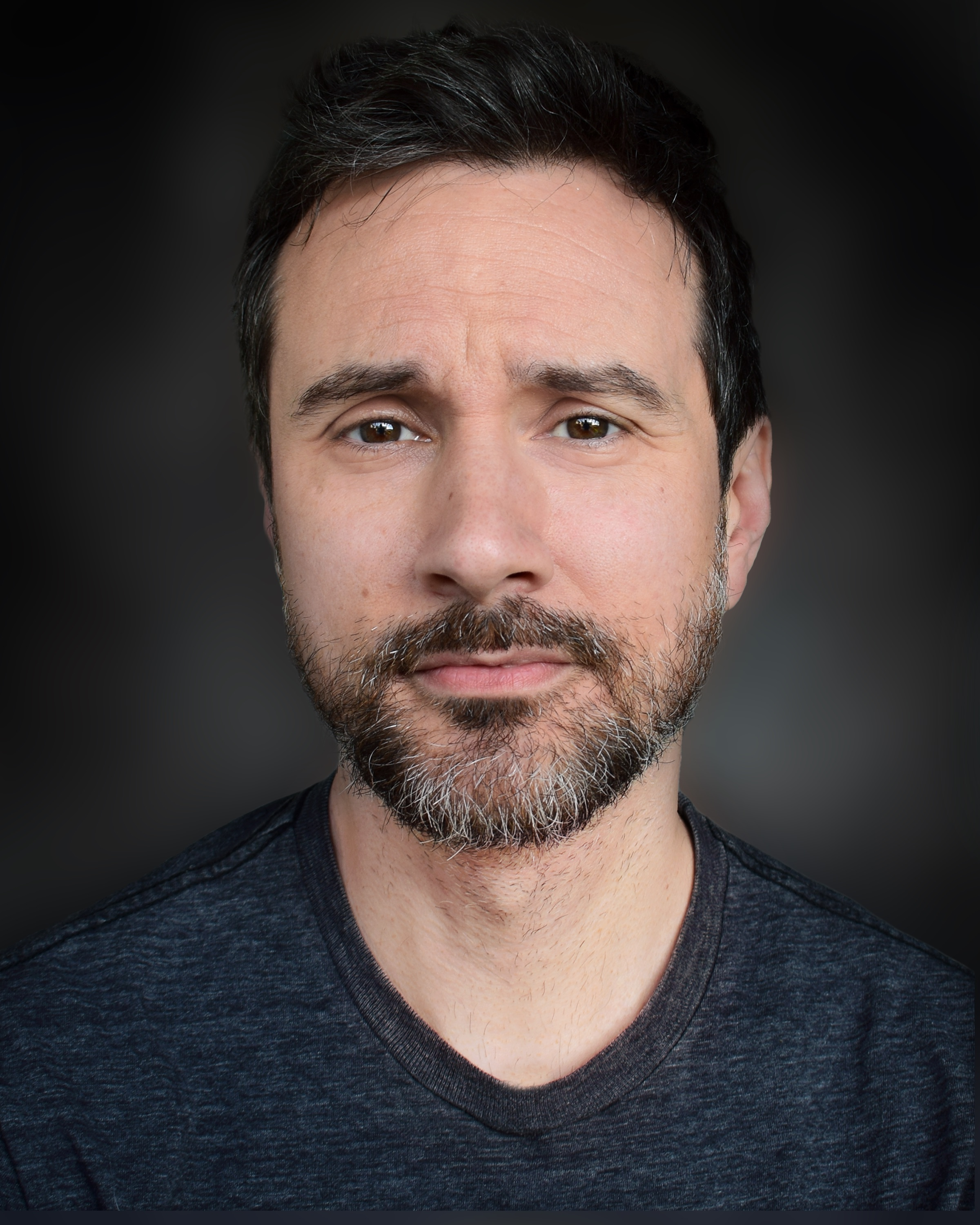
- Thompson in 2021
- Born: March 11, 1975 (age 51)
- Occupations: Actor; comedian
- Years active: 2000–present
- Known for: The Late Late Show with Craig Ferguson; The Howard Stern Show
- Website: www.thejrtshow.com

Josh Robert Thompson (born March 11, 1975) is an American actor. He is best known for his work on The Late Late Show with Craig Ferguson, providing the voice of robot skeleton and Craig Ferguson's sidekick Geoff Peterson along with numerous characters and impersonations, as well as his celebrity impersonations on Family Guy, The Howard Stern Show and Red Letter Media's Best of the Worst.

Thompson performs voice impressions of Morgan Freeman, Robert De Niro, Arnold Schwarzenegger, Matthew McConaughey, George Lucas, and Donald Trump. In The Kelly Clarkson Show, he currently serves as game announcer "God", using his Morgan Freeman impression. He has also performed as a stand-up comedian, often touring alongside Ferguson. His live-action projects include a lead role in the romantic comedy Nowhere Girl (2014), as well as a crowdfunded pilot episode called The Josh Robert Thompson Show.

== Early life ==
Thompson was born on March 11, 1975. He grew up in Cleveland, Ohio, "raised by classic television". He would watch as actors became different characters and began to mimic them. At age eight, his grandmother bought him a Fisher-Price tape recorder that he used to create radio-style "shows", voicing the host and the guests. The following year, he performed on stage in Peter Pan at the Cleveland Play House.

During his junior year at Padua Franciscan High School, Thompson delivered one line for the school's production of Oklahoma! and walked off to laughter and applause: "Then someone backstage said, 'They're clapping for you. They love you.' After that, I was hooked." Thompson and some of his classmates got a video camera and began making feature-length and short films, and television-style shows. He graduated from Padua in 1993.

Thompson moved to Los Angeles a few years later and performed on local television and as a stand-up comic while working toward his degree in TV, Radio, and Film Production at California State University, Fullerton. He uses his middle name professionally because a "Josh Thompson" was already registered with the Screen Actors Guild.

== Career ==
=== Radio appearances ===
Thompson's Arnold Schwarzenegger impression first gained national attention during the 2003 California gubernatorial recall election. Posing as Schwarzenegger, Thompson phoned in to Fox News Channel's morning program, Fox & Friends, fooling the hosts into believing (at least for a short while) that he was, in fact, Schwarzenegger.

Thompson's Fox News prank caught the attention of The Howard Stern Show, and the impression—dubbed "Fake Arnold" by the show's producers—soon became a mainstay on the program. At around the same time, Thompson also made a number of appearances on the Conway and Steckler and Conway and Whitman radio shows in Los Angeles (KLSX), and 96fm's Breakfast show in Perth, Western Australia, where he voiced a number of characters, including Fake Arnold, Robert De Niro, Sylvester Stallone, Michael Jackson, and Bill Cosby.

==== The Howard Stern Show ====
In April 2005, Thompson's "Fake Arnold" character proposed a fictitious plan to "blow up the moon". Fake Arnold's phony agenda managed to dupe MSNBC's Joe Scarborough, who appeared soon after on his television program, publicly lambasting the Governor for his alleged plan. Ten days later, after learning that the entire moon destruction scenario was a hoax, Scarborough apologized on-air for his erroneous comments.

On January 10, 2006, one day after Stern's show debuted on Sirius Satellite Radio, Thompson fooled Star Trek actor George Takei into believing he was actually speaking with Governor Schwarzenegger. Several minutes after the phone call with Fake Arnold ended, Takei was finally let in on the joke. One year later, the Takei prank was ranked sixth out of the Top 10 best moments from the show in 2006; it was also named as a top moment in the ten-year satellite tenure of the program.

Thompson has made several uncredited appearances in the show doing voice impressions like "Fake Arnold". He has done the show on and off again, with his most recent appearance being on the January 13, 2025, show where Howard credited him by name for doing Arnold Schwarzenegger and Pat Sajak.

=== Television work ===
==== The Late Late Show with Craig Ferguson ====
In February 2007, Thompson made his first on-camera television appearance as Governor Schwarzenegger on The Late Late Show with Craig Ferguson on CBS. He became a regular performer on the show, making appearances as Robert De Niro, "Frat Guy", Brian Deese, and Levi Johnston, as well as the voice of Morgan Freeman.

Starting on April 20, 2010, Thompson voiced Ferguson's robot skeleton sidekick Geoff Peterson, originally using pre-recorded clips of various reactions to the host's cues. Thompson tweeted his "recipe" for Geoff's voice in September: "1 part Snagglepuss. 1 part Vincent Price. 2 parts George Takei." On May 16, 2011, Thompson performed Geoff as a show guest; in a later skit spoofing the show's opening broadcast, Thompson portrayed Peterson as a living sidekick who suggested that Ferguson could reanimate his skeleton should something befall him while skydiving. Beginning June 29, 2011, Thompson voiced and performed Geoff live for nearly every episode, both in-studio and in such locations as Paris, France.

Once Thompson began voicing Geoff Peterson live, he incorporated several of his own impressions into the character's repertoire. He has performed his Morgan Freeman impression for Freeman during the actor's appearances. In June 2011, Geoff asked Freeman: "Would you like to hear my Morgan Freeman voice?" and: "What would you like to say to yourself?" Freeman gave the impression a thumbs-up and called it "outstanding".

In 2014, Thompson took over as the voice and operator of Sandra Peterson, the remote-controlled rhinoceros head that hangs over the fireplace. The character was originated by actress Dana DeLorenzo.

Craig Ferguson told Larry King Now in 2014 that he and Thompson would continue to work together after leaving The Late Late Show in December. In the interview, Ferguson called Thompson a "comedic genius".

Following the end of the program in 2014, Thompson returned to the show a year later, in March 2015, where he made his television stand-up debut, in the episode where fellow Ohio native Drew Carey served as guest host.

=== The Josh Robert Thompson Show ===
Using his online presence in August 2015, Thompson created an Indiegogo campaign that would help fund the post production costs of his pilot episode. In three days, Thompson's online following helped successfully fund the post production costs raising $51,613 (US) passing its original $25,000 goal.

During post production, the audio mixing was completed at Skywalker Ranch, where Ben Burtt overlooked some of the process and found Thompson's George Lucas sketch funny. Ben Burtt later complimented Thompson saying that Lucas himself would love his show and his characters.

On April 9, 2018, Thompson uploaded his pilot to various social media platforms to help gain traction, including Twitter, Instagram, and Periscope.

=== Voice acting ===
Since 2011, Thompson has voiced various characters on Family Guy, American Dad!, and Skylanders Academy. While voicing a few sketches on Jimmy Kimmel Live!, Thompson also appeared on The Cleveland Show from 2011 until its cancellation in 2013. He has been the announcer of the Writers Guild of America Awards since 2017.

Since 2019, Thompson has been voicing "God" with his Morgan Freeman impression on The Kelly Clarkson Show during the program's game segments.

==== On-screen projects ====
Thompson began working on his first television series while still on The Late Late Show. The first installment, dubbed WJRT Television, starred Thompson alongside Dana DeLorenzo in a television news show parody. While some episodes were uploaded to Funny or Die, the series was not sold to a network.

In 2014, Thompson announced plans for an upcoming variety show, The Josh Robert Thompson Show. Its pilot episode was completed in 2015 through a crowdfunding campaign via Indiegogo.

==== Podcast ====
Thompson has also embarked on various podcasts throughout his career including Darren Carter's "Pocket Party", and Brody Stevens' "Festival of Friendship". The most recent installment of his Joshin' Around podcast was picked up by iTunes in 2016, consisting of Thompson alone improvising all material.

=== Film ===
Thompson has starred as narrator in Yogi Bear (2010) and Scary Movie 5 (2013), with on-camera appearances as lead character in the film Nowhere Girl (2014), and a supporting role as a priest in the film Revelator (2017). He was also featured in The Angry Birds Movie (2016), voicing two characters, and voiced a Construction Foreman in the film The Nut Job 2: Nutty by Nature (2017).

=== Other work ===
In 2010, Thompson appeared in advertisements for More Than insurance, doing his Morgan Freeman impression. In the advertisement, Thompson's character is named More Than Freeman.

=== Web series ===
In 2018, Thompson starred in a new web series called "F#cking 40", a series about becoming middle aged. Thompson stars alongside writer and director Bill Caco, Jeff Pride, and Justin Johnson. F#cking 40 won "Best Web Series" at the FirstGlance Film Festival in Philadelphia.

In 2025, Thompson made guest appearances on Red Letter Media’s Best of the Worst and re:View series.

== Original characters ==
Thompson's original creations include: televangelist the Rev. Apostle BG; gay cabaret singer Robin Sooper; Gary the Ogre; and Snorky Lopez, a Mexican raccoon.

== Filmography ==
=== Television ===
Year	Title	Role	Notes
2000	The Tonight Show with Jay Leno	Himself	1 episode
2003–11	The Howard Stern Show / Howard TV	"Fake" Arnold Schwarzenegger (voice)	
2005	The Princes of Malibu	Himself/Arnold Schwarzenegger (voice)	1 episode
2006	The Emperor's New School	Friendly Joe (voice)	Episode: "The Good, the Bad and the Kronk/Mud"
2007	Let's Paint TV	Robert De Niro	Episode: "Let's Exercise, Cook Pasta, and Paint Robert De Niro!"
2007–14	The Late Late Show with Craig Ferguson	Geoff Peterson, additional characters; himself	478 episodes
2009	True Beauty	Clothing Store Clerk	Episode: "Million Dollar Look"
2009	Jimmy Kimmel Live!	Alex Trebek (voice)	1 episode
2010	Glenn Martin, DDS	LeBron James, Tom Brady, Arnold Schwarzenegger (voice)	2 episodes
2011–13	The Cleveland Show	David Schwimmer (voice)	Episode: "Hot Cocoa Bang Bang"
2011–present	American Dad!	Wayne Gretzky, Jerry Seinfeld, Gilbert Gottfried, Robert Stack, Daniel Stern, Paul Rudd, Morgan Freeman, Elijah Wood, Various (voice)	Recurring role
2011–present	Family Guy	Himself, Doggie Daddy, Thomas Edison, Stanley Tucci, Kevin James, Tim Robbins, Morgan Freeman, Joe Biden, Aziz Ansari, Scott Baio, Ted Williams' Head, Christoph Waltz, Mark Ruffalo, Craig Kilborn, Donald Trump, Justin Trudeau, Alan Thicke, Dennis Franz, John Mayer, Danny McBride, Joey Lawrence, Michael McDonald, Willie Nelson, Don Imus, Patrick Swayze, Dennis Quaid, Tommy Lee Jones, Sean Hannity, James Taylor, Andrew Cuomo, Aaron Sorkin, Tom Selleck, John Davidson, Garrison Keillor, Samuel Alito, Tom Brady, Various (voice)	Recurring role
2013	WJRT Television	Himself; various	
2013	The Birthday Boys	Morgman Freemont	Episode: "All Your Favorites Are Back"
2015	Robot Chicken	Arthur "Fonzie" Fonzarelli, Cisco Ramon (voices)	Episode: "Ants on a Hamburger"
2016	Man Seeking Woman	Condom (voice)	Episode: "Feather"
2016	Angel from Hell	Morgan Freeman Impersonator	Episode: "The Flask"
2016–18	Skylanders Academy	Skull, Various (voice)	Recurring role
2018	Motown Magic	Various (voice)	Netflix Original Series
2019–26	The Kelly Clarkson Show	God (voice)	
2020–21	Robot Chicken	Steve Harrington (voice)	Episode: "Gracie Purgatory in: That's How You Get Hemorrhoids"
2020–21	Robot Chicken	Larry David, Jeff Greene (voices)	Episode: "May Cause Light Cannibalism"
2021–22	Inside Job	Al Gore, Bradley Cooper, Canadian Scarface, Gil, JFK, JFK Clones, Jeff Bezos, Jimmy Fallon, Ken Burns, MI6 Agent, Matt, Politician, Rafe Masters, Squoo, Steve, The Pope, Tobey Maguire, Various (voice)	Recurring role
2022	The Final Straw	Fred (voice)	Recurring role

=== Film ===
Year	Title	Role	Notes
2008	Bigger, Stronger, Faster*	Himself/Arnold Schwarzenegger	
2010	Yogi Bear	Narrator (voice)	
2013	Scary Movie 5	Morgan Freeman (voice)	
2014	The Bag Man	Various (voice)	
2014	Nowhere Girl	Tyler	
2016	The Angry Birds Movie	Brad Bird, Dane the Saxophone Bird (voice)	
2016	Revelator	Father Levi	
2017	The Nut Job 2: Nutty by Nature	Construction Foreman, Additional Voices (voice)	
2021	Barb and Star Go to Vista Del Mar	Morgan Freemond	
2021	Paw Patrol: The Movie	Technician (voice)	
2023	Once Upon a Studio	Grumpy (voice)	Short film
2025	Captain America: Brave New World	Announcer (voice; uncredited)	

=== Video games ===
Year	Title	Role	Notes
2006	Disney's Chicken Little: Ace in Action	Sleazel Weazel (voice)	
2006	Rise and Fall: Civilizations at War	Alexander the Great, Emperor Octavian (voice)	
2008	Elements of Destruction	Dr. Edgar Herbert (voice)	
2008	Call of Duty: World at War	U.S. Soldier (voice)	
2008	WALL-E	Human Male (voice)	
2008	Bolt	(voice)	
2009	Free Realms	Goblin, Yeti, Dog, Additional characters (voice)	
2009	Up	Various dogs (voice)	
2009	Brütal Legend	Healer, Additional characters (voice)	
2009	James Cameron's Avatar: The Game	Various characters (voice)	
2009	G.I. Joe: The Rise of Cobra	General Hawk (voice)	
2010	Dead to Rights: Retribution	Operator, Medic, Union, Security Guards (voice)	
2010	Final Fantasy XIII	Rygdea (voice)	
2010	Kingdom Hearts Birth by Sleep	Prince Phillip (voice)	
2011	NCIS: The Video Game	Leroy Jethro Gibbs (voice)	
2013	Lego City Undercover	Blue Whittaker, Albert Spindlerouter (voice)	
2014	The Lego Movie Videogame	Vitruvius (voice)	Replacing Morgan Freeman
2017	Lego Dimensions	Albert Spindlerouter (voice)	
2020	Fallout 76: Wastelanders	Batter, Frankie Beckett, Sage, Raiders, Settlers, Flight Recorder (voice)	

=== Music ===
- Austrian Death Machine - Arnold Schwarzenegger (voice) on 2009 album Double Brutal

=== Web ===
- Movie Fights - Himself (Episode 108 - What Iconic Horror Villains Should Face Off in Their Own Movie?)
- Best of the Worst - Himself (Wheel of the Worst #29, #31 and #32; Terror Squad, Back from Hell, and Traxx; Junka #5)

== Bibliography ==
- VoyageLA; Thompson, Josh Robert (April 4, 2022). "Check Out Josh Robert Thompson's Story". Voyage LA Magazine. Archived from the original on April 4, 2022.
