= The Honours Board =

Book by Pamela Hansford Johnson

- First edition cover
- Author: Pamela Hansford Johnson
- Publisher: Macmillan
- Publication date: 1970

The Honours Board is a 1970 novel by English writer Pamela Hansford Johnson. Set in the South of England at Downs Park, a small fictional preparatory school for boys, it follows the lives of the members of the staff over a couple of years. The teachers see themselves as a close-knit community; however, time and again antipathies, rivalries, personal problems, tragedy and death affect the peaceful and harmonious life at the school.

The title of the novel refers to the commemorative plaque which lists all the pupils who have won scholarships to public schools[UK independent schools]. Downs Park's academic record is not impressive, so throughout the novel the headmaster tries to attract gifted boys for his school.

== Plot summary ==
Cyril Annick and his wife Grace have been running Downs Park for many years. Both are universally respected and loved by staff and pupils alike. Unforeseen problems for the school arise when the idiosyncrasies and compulsions of individual members of the staff threaten to upset life at the school. There is Rupert Massinger, the second master, whose womanizing makes victims of both the school secretary and the headmaster's grown-up daughter. Also, with money he has inherited Massinger is planning to take over the school and gently force the Annicks into early retirement. To everyone's surprise, as a strategic move, Massinger and his wife, who also teaches at the school, decide to resign, to reculer pour mieux sauter.

Elspeth Murray, the middle-aged French mistress, has been feeling extremely lonely since her husband's death and has only taken up teaching recently to find some sort of distraction. At first, her irrational sexual attraction to Betty Cope, a pretty young lesbian who assists Grace Annick in her capacity as Matron, causes some eye-rolling. Later, when a series of petty thefts occurs everyone suspects a pupil to be stealing his schoolmates' things. However, Murray turns out to be a kleptomaniac, and when she is caught in the act she thinks she cannot cope any longer and commits suicide in the school swimming pool.

Leo Canning, the young science master whose humble social background and troubled childhood make it difficult for him to adapt to the thoroughly bourgeois atmosphere of the school, falls in love with Penelope Saxton, the headmaster's young widowed daughter, and in the end they get married. However, it takes Penelope a long time until she makes up her mind to spend the rest of her life with Canning. In the meantime, she is courted by the father of the youngest staff member, a baronet called Sir James Pettifer whose aristocratic ways she finds quite alluring.

More trouble appears with the arrival of Norman and Delia Poole, who have come to replace Massinger and his wife. It does not take the staff long to discover that Delia is a hopeless alcoholic whose pathetic attempts at rationalizing her addiction are embarrassing to everyone who happens to witness them. She has to give up her art classes quite soon again and over the following months mainly stays at their home on the school grounds. Finally, although he is a popular teacher, Norman Poole hands in his notice to be able to care for his wife full-time.

Cyril Annick has no intention to retire, let alone hand over to Massinger. However, when his wife suffers a mild stroke he sees it as the last straw and willy-nilly sells out to him. The Annicks move to a flat in nearby Eastbourne, where shortly afterwards Grace has another stroke and dies. Not yet 60, Cyril Annick moves to London to be near his daughter and son-in-law.

== Quote ==
- "A man who never learns enough to change a principle is a silly clot." [Chapter 28]
