= The Trojan Brothers (novel) =

1944 novel

- First edition
- Author: Pamela Hansford Johnson
- Language: English
- Genre: Comedy
- Publisher: Michael Joseph
- Publication date: 1944
- Publication place: United Kingdom
- Media type: Print

The Trojan Brothers is a 1944 comedy novel by the British writer Pamela Hansford Johnson. In 1920s London two music hall performers, whose act involves them dressing as the respective ends of a pantomime horse have a falling out when one of them falls for an attractive society lady.

== Adaptation ==
In 1946 it was made into a British film of the same title directed by Maclean Rogers and starring Patricia Burke, David Farrar and Bobby Howes.

== Bibliography ==
- David, Dierdre. Pamela Hansford Johnson: A Writing Life. Oxford University Press, 2017.
- Goble, Alan. The Complete Index to Literary Sources in Film. Walter de Gruyter, 1999.
