= More Than =

- Company type: Subsidiary
- Industry: Finance
- Founded: 2001
- Founders: Royal & Sun Alliance Insurance Group
- Headquarters: United Kingdom
- Services: Insurance
- Parent: RSA Insurance Group
- Divisions: More Than Business
- Website: MoreThan.com

More Than (styled as MORE TH>N) is an insurance company based in the United Kingdom. Having previously provided car, home and travel insurance before exiting those markets in 2024, More Than currently only offers pet insurance. Its business arm More Than BUSINESS offered business insurance. The company is a subsidiary of the RSA Insurance Group.

The brand launched in 2001, under the slogan of "Don't Accept Less Than More Than". More Than is known in the United Kingdom for its television advertising, including features such as More Than Freeman (a parody of Morgan Freeman), Lucky The Dog and the Personal Project Manager ad.

== History ==
More Than was launched as a subsidiary of Royal & Sun Alliance in 2001. Royal & Sun Alliance formed in 1996, following the merger of Royal Insurance and Sun Alliance.

The insurance group set aside £20 million in order to create the new More Than brand. Since its inception, the company has focused on developing small service teams to care for customers in a more personal way. The company also changed the way their call centres functioned by removing scripts, thus enabling claims handlers to actually talk to customers, and encouraged call centre staff to recommend suppliers from the More Than network in order to resolve a problem.

In February 2008, it was announced that their parent company, Royal & Sun Alliance Insurance Group, would be rebranding to RSA Insurance Group. This however had no effect on any of their subsidiaries, including More Than. In 2013, More Than updated their brand promise to 'Where You Mean More' and became an official partner of the RSPCA.

By March 2015, the insurance company had donated over £260,000 to help unwanted or neglected animals in England and Wales as well as offering six weeks’ free insurance to those who re home a pet from the RSPCA. The company launched SM>RT WHEELS in 2014, a telematics insurance. The product focused on the young drivers market, allowing them to make savings, by rewarding safe driving throughout the year and at their time of renewal.

In March 2023, it was announced by RSA owners Intact Financial that RSA would stop offering insurance under the More Than brand. Renewal rights for car insurance policies were transferred to Swinton Insurance, while Admiral purchased the company's home and pet insurance business for £115 million in December 2023.

== Advertising ==
The brand launched in 2001, with a campaign featuring Lucky the Dog. Lucky went on to star in more than twenty adverts. The campaign, produced by Ogilvy & Mather, called Where's Lucky? The ads looked like an appeal for information about a lost dog, with the aim of directing people to the website, WheresLucky.com. The advertising campaign, at drawing interest to the newly formed More Than brand.

The success of early adverts, one of the first featuring "Lucky" driving his owner’s car home without crashing it, led the brand to continue using Lucky for another five years. During this five year period, the company used the slogan, More Than Lucky.

In March 2002, More Than announced their new ad agency would be Camp Chipperfield Hill Murray (CCHM). In March 2006, More Than aired their first television advert without Lucky, and the new slogan More Than – We Do More. In February 2011, the insurance company launched a television advert starring Josh Robert Thompson replicating the voice and speaking style of actor Morgan Freeman. The term "More Than Freeman" was used throughout the advert.

In the years that have followed, the television adverts have focused on how More Than assists clients with a more personal touch. These have included the burglary advert More Than Help, in 2013, which was followed up with adverts called Name Your Price and Personal Project Manager, which aired in February 2015.

== Recognition ==
- 2010 – the company won Best Pet Insurance Provider at the Personal Finance Awards
- 2011 – the company won Best Pet Insurance Provider at the Personal Finance Awards
- 2012 – the company won Best Pet Insurance Provider at the Personal Finance Awards
- 2013 – the company won Best Pet Insurance Provider at the Your Money awards and the Best Home Emergency Cover Provider at the What Mortgage awards.
- 2014 – the company won What Mortgage’s ‘Best Overall Insurer', Consumer Intelligence’s ‘Intelligent Choice’ gold award for motor insurance and Personal Finance’s ‘Best Pet Insurance’ award
