= Pamela Hansford Johnson =

English writer (1912–1981)

The Right Honourable The Lady Snow CBE FRSL
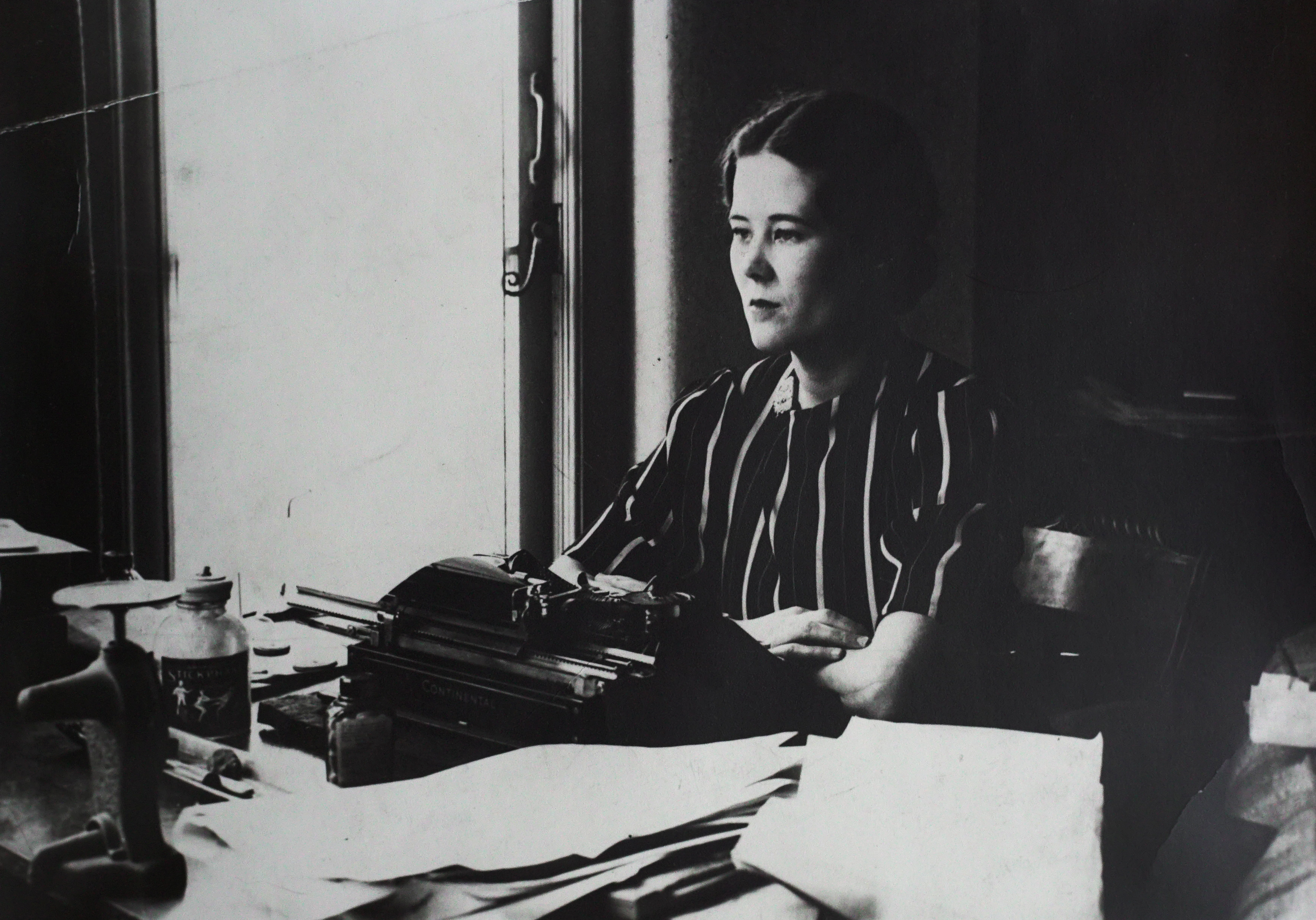
- Pamela Hansford Johnson at her typewriter in the 1930s or 1940s
- Born: 29 May 1912; London, England
- Died: 18 June 1981 (aged 69); London, England
- Occupation: Writer
- Spouses: Gordon Neil Stewart (m. 1939; div. 1949) Charles Percy Snow (m. 1950; died 1980)
- Children: 3
- Relatives: Eric Lubbock, 4th Baron Avebury (son-in-law)
- Writing career
- Period: 1935–1980
- Genres: Fiction, literary and social criticism

Pamela Hansford Johnson, Baroness Snow (29 May 1912 – 18 June 1981) was an English novelist, playwright, poet, literary and social critic.

== Life ==
Johnson was born in London. Her mother, Amy Clotilda Howson, was a singer and actress, from a theatrical family. Her mother's father, C E Howson, worked for the London Lyceum Company, as Sir Henry Irving's Treasurer. Her father, Reginald Kenneth Johnson, was a colonial civil servant who spent much of his life working in Nigeria. Her father died when she was 11 years old, leaving debts. Her mother earned a living as a typist. Until Pamela was 22, the family lived at 53 Battersea Rise, Clapham, South London.

Johnson attended Clapham County Girls Grammar School, where she excelled at English, art history, and drama. After leaving school at the age of 16, she took a secretarial course and later worked for several years at the Central Hanover Bank and Trust Company. She began her literary career by writing poems, which were published by Victor Neuburg in the Sunday Referee. In 1933, Johnson wrote to Dylan Thomas, who had also been published in the same paper, and a friendship developed. Marriage was considered, but the idea was ultimately abandoned.

In 1936 she married an Australian journalist, Gordon Neil Stewart. Their son Andrew was born in 1941, and a daughter Lindsay, Baroness Avebury (born 1944). Johnson and her first husband Neil were divorced in 1949. In 1950, she married her second husband, the novelist C. P. Snow (later Baron Snow). Their son Philip was born in 1952.

She was a Fellow of the Royal Society of Literature and received a CBE in 1975. She was awarded the honorary degrees of Hon. DLitt (Temple University, Philadelphia 1963; York University, Toronto; Widener University, Chester, Pennsylvania) and Hon. DHL (Louisville, Kentucky). She was a Fellow of the Center for Advanced Studies at Wesleyan University, of Timothy Dwight College, Yale University and of Founders College, York University, Toronto and held visiting academic positions at other North American universities including Harvard, Berkeley, Haverford and Cornell. She suffered from migraine for much of her career and wrote about the condition in her autobiographical memoirs Important to Me and her novel The Humbler Creation. She was the first president of the Migraine Association and a founding trustee of the Migraine Trust.

C. P. Snow died in July 1980. Less than a year later, Pamela Hansford Johnson died in London. Her ashes were scattered on the river Avon, at Stratford upon Avon.

== Works ==
Johnson wrote 27 novels. Her first novel, This Bed Thy Centre, was published in 1935. Her last novel, A Bonfire, was published in the year of her death, 1981. Her themes centred on the moral responsibility of the individual in their personal and social relations.

Her first novel, This Bed Thy Centre, caused some controversy on its release. Irish novelist Sean Ó Faoláin, writing in The Spectator, said "Miss Johnson... has circumscribed herself so much by insisting on the reality of sex that her 'bed' might be thought less a centre than a circumference". However, the book was positively reviewed by Ralph Straus in The Sunday Times, Compton Mackenzie in the Daily Mail, and Cyril Connolly in the New Statesman.

Wendy Pollard, writing in her 2014 biography of Johnson, suggests that Dylan Thomas, who suggested the title of This Bed Thy Centre, was influenced by the opening chapter when he came to write Under Milk Wood, as both works describe the different characters of their setting as the day begins.

The 1959 novel The Unspeakable Skipton was another high point of Johnson's critical appraisal. The critic Walter Allen described her as "as good as any novelist writing in this country today", and that her writing was in the realist tradition of George Eliot. The Times Literary Supplement said Johnson "has become known to the reading public as a novelist of great craftsmanship and distinction". In her introduction to a 2002 reprint of the novel, Ruth Rendell wrote that Johnson was "undeservedly forgotten today just as, in her lifetime, she was undeservedly overshadowed by her husband C. P. Snow... Revival for his work is unlikely while her's is overdue. She possessed the imagination and the ability he lacked to write lyrical but never "purple" prose, and there is no finer example in her canon than The Unspeakable Skipton."

The fictional genres she used ranged from romantic comedy (Night and Silence Who is Here?) and high comedy (The Unspeakable Skipton) to tragedy (The Holiday Friend) and the psychological study of cruelty (An Error of Judgement). She also wrote two detective novels, jointly with her first husband Neil Stewart, under the joint pseudonym Nap Lombard. She wrote seven short plays, six of them in collaboration with C. P. Snow. She published a number of critical works, short stories, verse, sociological studies, and a collection of autobiographical essays. She reviewed extensively for magazines and newspapers and broadcast on the BBC radio programme The Critics.

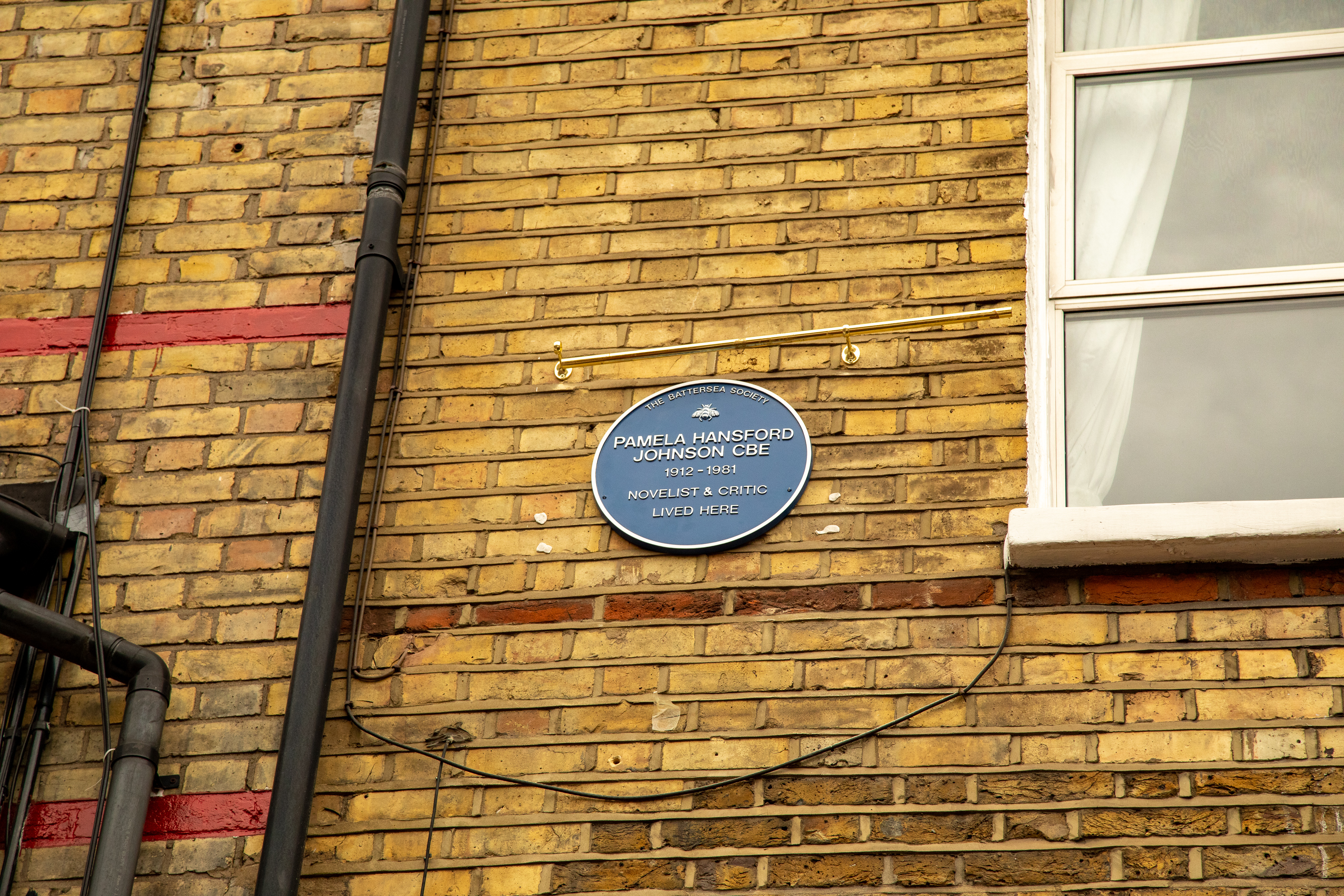
A plaque unveiled in May 2019 to Johnson above the house she lived in at 53 Battersea Rise, Clapham

In the 2010s, some of Johnson's novels were republished by Hodder & Stoughton and Macmillan in their Bello imprint. Reviewing five novels published by Hodder, Philip Hensher noted that "Johnson was an effective reporter from a particular streak of suburban London, and explored, almost without knowing, the mores and conventions of a forgotten way of living."

Johnson's biographer Deirdre David concluded that "Working in the moral tradition of George Eliot, with the commitment to social justice found in Charles Dickens, and with an unwavering belief that an important task of the English novel was the depiction of everyday life to be discovered from Jane Austen to Anthony Trollope, she was sometimes dismissed as a 'middlebrow' novelist who happily catered to her undemanding readers."

David Holloway, writing Johnson's obituary in the Daily Telegraph, asserted that "never for a moment did she admit in public, something that was evident to everyone who had read their books, that she was an infinitely better novelist than C.P. Snow".

=== Novels ===
- This Bed Thy Centre (1935)
- Blessed Above Women (1936)
- Here Today (1937)
- World's End (1937)
- The Monument (1938)
- Girdle of Venus (1939)
- Too Dear for My Possessing (1940)
- The Family Pattern (1942)
- Winter Quarters (1943)
- The Trojan Brothers (1944)
- An Avenue of Stone (1947)
- A Summer to Decide (1948)
- The Philistines (1949)
- Catherine Carter (1952)
- An Impossible Marriage (1954)
- The Last Resort (1956)
- The Unspeakable Skipton (1959)
- The Humbler Creation (1959)
- An Error of Judgement (1962)
- Night and Silence Who is Here? (1963)
- Cork Street, Next to the Hatters (1965)
- The Survival of the Fittest (1968)
- The Honours Board (1970)
- The Holiday Friend (1972)
- The Good Listener (1975)
- The Good Husband (1978)
- A Bonfire (1981)
- Tidy Death (with Neil Stewart) as Nap Lombard (1940)
- The Grinning Pig (with Neil Stewart) as Nap Lombard (1943)

=== Critical works ===
- Thomas Wolfe: A Critical Study (1947)
- Ivy Compton-Burnett (Writers and their Work Series) (1951)
- Marcel Proust's Letters to his Mother, ed. George D. Painter (includes essay)
- The Novels of Marcel Proust (1956)

=== Drama ===
- Corinth House (1950)
- Family Party (with C. P. Snow) (1951)
- Her Best Foot Forward (with C. P. Snow) (1951)
- The Pigeon with the Silver Foot (with C. P. Snow) (1951)
- Spare the Rod (with C. P. Snow) (1951)
- The Supper Dance (with C. P. Snow) (1951)
- To Murder Mrs Mortimer (with C. P. Snow) (1951)
- Six Proust Reconstructions (1957)

=== Sociology ===
- On Iniquity: some personal reflections arising out of the Moors Murders trial (1967), Macmillan, ISBN 978-0684129846

=== Poetry ===
- Symphony for Full Orchestra (1934)

=== Translation ===
- The Rehearsal, by Jean Anouilh, with Kitty Black (1961)

=== Memoir ===
- Important To Me (1974)
