= Pantomime horse =

Theatrical representation of a horse

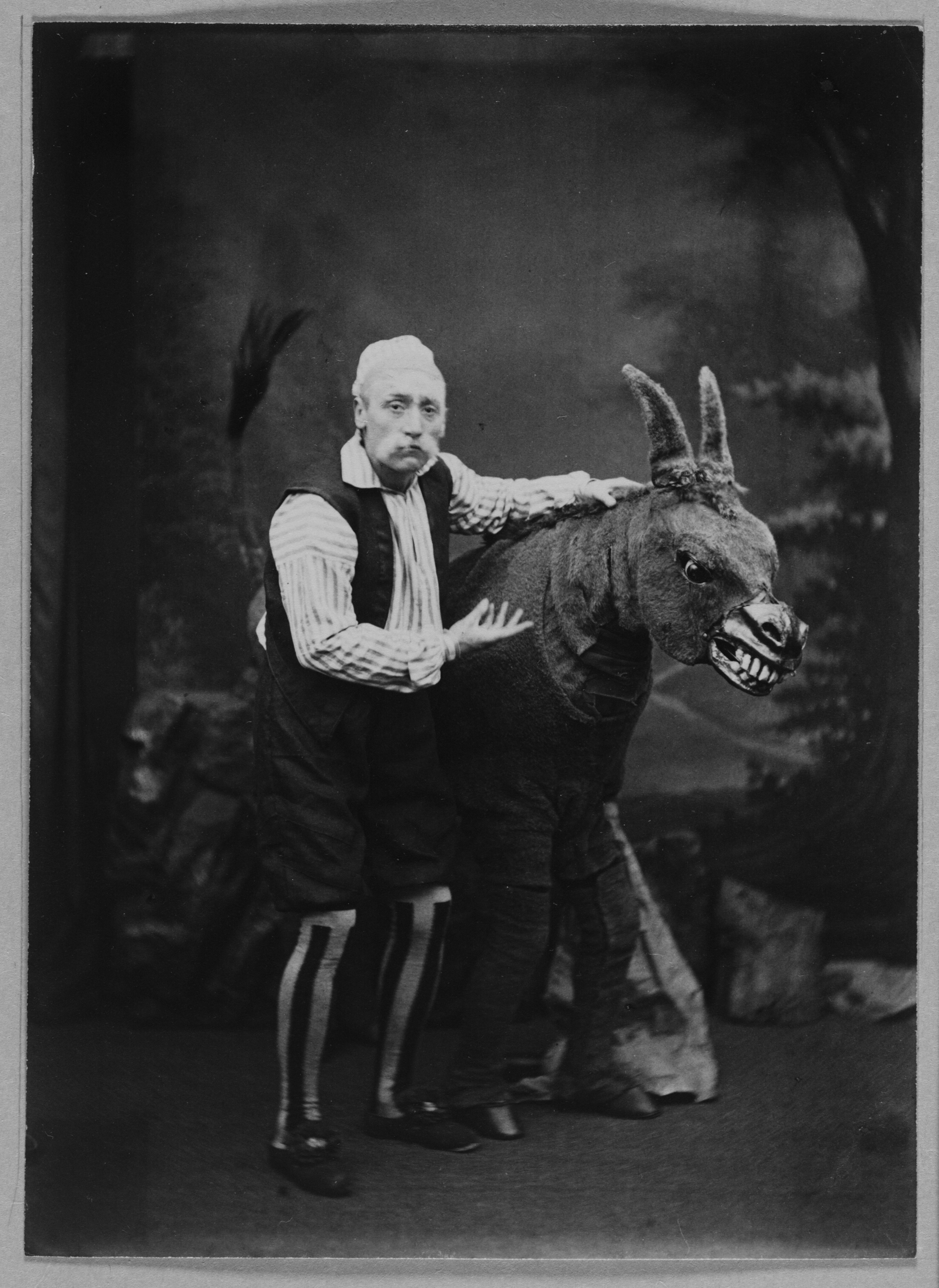
Actor with pantomime horse from 1869 or 1870

A pantomime horse is a theatrical representation of a horse or other quadruped by two actors in a single costume who cooperate and synchronize their movements. One actor plays the front end, including the horse's head and its front legs, in a more-or-less upright posture and with a reasonable field of view afforded by eye holes in the horse's head. The other actor, playing the rear end of the animal, must bend at the waist so that their torso is horizontal like that of a horse and put his arms around the waist of the first actor. They can see little, although there are normally eye holes in the bottom part of the horse's torso to enable them to see where they are putting their feet and to enable them to breathe.

Pantomime horses and cows feature in Christmas pantomimes, mainly in the United Kingdom.

== History ==
The progenitors of the pantomime horse costume were the centaur and the ass, costumes used in ancient Greek and Roman revels, which carried on to commedia dell'arte shows. However, the two-person comic variant of the horse or donkey costume was introduced in the late 19th century. It remained popular throughout the mid-20th century, becoming an "icon of comedy" that entered into the British imagination and the English language.

The "grandfather" of the modern pantomime horse was the Blondin Donkey, introduced at the Royal Holborn theatre in 1885 by the acrobatic Griffiths brothers, Fred and Joe, and named after the tightrope walker who was famous for crossing Niagara Falls. A different horse known as Pogo the Performing Horse and worn by a father-and-son team became a popular panto feature and appeared at the London Coliseum in 1923.

British character actor, Colin Gordon began his stage career as the back end of a pantomime horse in a 1934 production of "Toad of Toad Hall".

== Types ==
Panto horse costumes range from low-cost, "ready-to-wear" fabric versions to more complex puppet suits that have moving features operated with special wires from within. The most basic costumes have a sheet-like body that is draped over the wearers, while professional costumes have a closed body that often contains a padded frame to conform it to a certain shape. These costumes usually separate into two halves with a sealable seam down the middle of the body.

Other types of similar costumes include pantomime cows, zebras, and camels. Many modern-day pantomime horses are used in charity "horse" races, such as the London Pantomime Horse Race in Greenwich, London, an annual world-famous race-day event.

== In pop culture ==
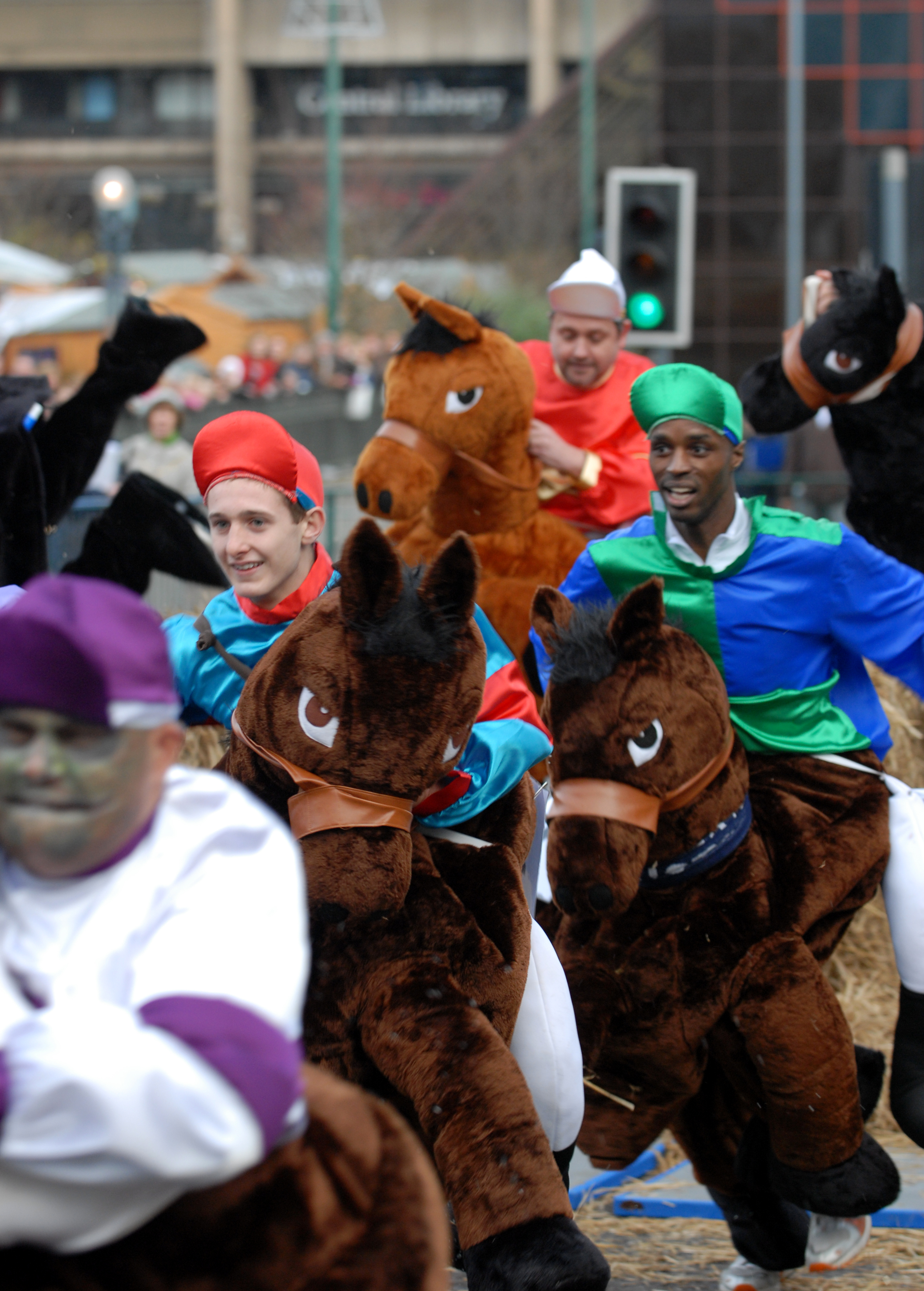
Runners at the 2009 Pantomime Horse Grand National in Birmingham, England. The costumes here are designed for only a single person.

Pantomime horses and pantomime cows feature in Christmas pantomimes, mainly in the United Kingdom. A skilled pair of performers can dance as a pantomime horse. Pantomime horses feature prominently in an episode of Monty Python's Flying Circus titled "Blood, Devastation, Death, War and Horror". In the "Merchant Banker" sketch, two pantomime horses are forced to fight to the death for their job. Another sketch features a pantomime horse as a James Bond-esque secret agent, chasing its enemy around the world in cars, rickshaws, and even riding actual horses. The episode also features a pantomime goose and a pantomime dame Princess Margaret, which later appeared in the video for the George Harrison song "Crackerbox Palace".

A song on British pop group Suede's eponymous debut album is called "Pantomime Horse".

The American late-night talk-show host Craig Ferguson has a recurring sketch with a pantomime horse named after Secretariat that originally appeared every time a doorbell rang, accompanied by a frenzied dance performed by onlookers who rapidly and repeatedly extend their arms. The horse first appeared on October 11, 2010. When the program moved to a new studio, an on-set stable was built for Secretariat. This pantomime Secretariat has begun to appear on other CBS programs.

== See also ==
- Hobby horse
- Mari Lwyd
- Lion dance
