= Warrior Scarlet =

1958 historical adventure novel for children by Rosemary Sutcliff

- First edition cover
- Author: Rosemary Sutcliff
- Illustrator: Charles Keeping
- Language: English
- Genre: Historical novel
- Publisher: Oxford University Press
- Publication date: 1958
- Publication place: United Kingdom
- Media type: Print
- Pages: 207 pp
- ISBN: 0-19-271133-4
- Preceded by: The Silver Branch
- Followed by: The Lantern Bearers

Warrior Scarlet is an historical adventure novel for children by Rosemary Sutcliff, illustrated by Charles Keeping and first published in 1958. It is set in Bronze Age Britain, approximately 900 BCE, and takes place in and around the South Downs in England.

== Plot summary ==
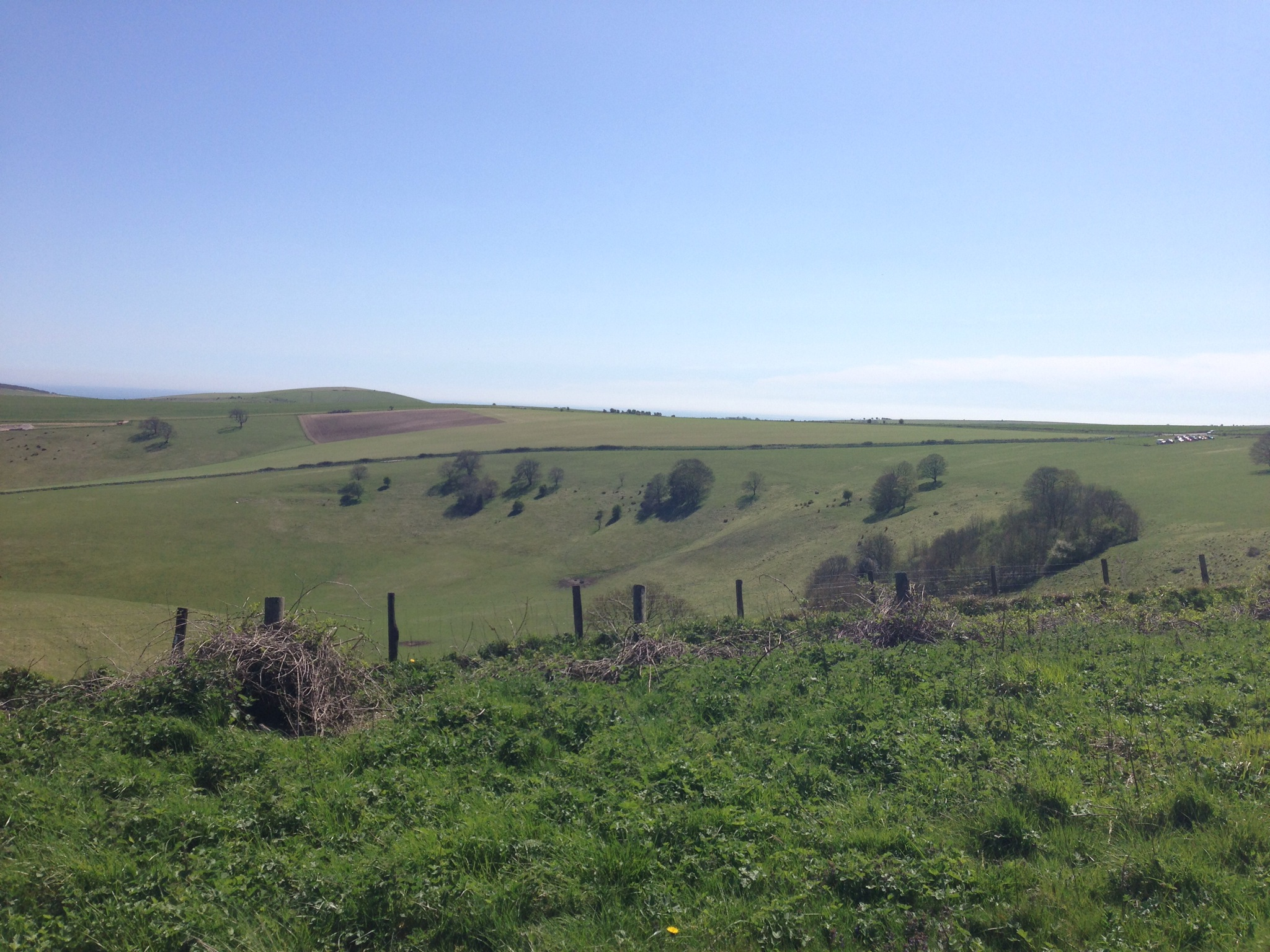
The South Downs near Bramber in Sussex; the landscape where Drem grows up

The story centres on Drem, a young boy who dreams of becoming a warrior and earning the right to wear a kilt of 'Warrior Scarlet' but fears his crippled right arm will prevent this. To pass the test of manhood, he must kill a wolf on his own; those who fail are expelled from the tribe and sent to the 'Half People' who herd sheep on the South Downs.

Drem lives with his elder brother Drustic, grandfather, mother and a girl named Blai, abandoned years before by a travelling bronzesmith. He teaches himself to compensate for his disability and at the age of 12 goes to the 'Boys House' to learn how to be a warrior; while there, the Chieftain's son Vortrix becomes his friend and blood brother. At 15, the boys undertake their 'Wolf Slaying' but when it is Drem's turn, he slips and is nearly killed, surviving only when Vortrix wounds the wolf, which escapes.

As a result, he is sent to the Half People, only meeting his former friends when they provide the Wolf Guard to protect the sheep. One evening towards the end of winter, Drem sets out to rescue an old shepherd named Doli, who went searching for a lost sheep; he finds him but is attacked by three wolves, including the same one he failed to kill during his Wolf Slaying. This time he succeeds, although badly wounded, and is saved only by the arrival of the Wolf Guard. When Drem recovers, he learns that since it was the same wolf and wounded him in the same place, his previous failure has been wiped clean; he has succeeded and later undergoes the initiation ceremony whereby boys become warriors.

Drem is shown to have grown emotionally as well; his failure forced him to face his own fear of being an outcast and see others with greater compassion and understanding. The final chapter centres on the Celtic festival of Beltane, which occurs around 1 May and signalled the beginning of the new year; during this festival, couples who wish to be married leap through the flames of a large bonfire. Drem realises he and Blai are both outcasts and belong together; the book ends with them running up the hill to the bonfire.

== Historical background and themes ==
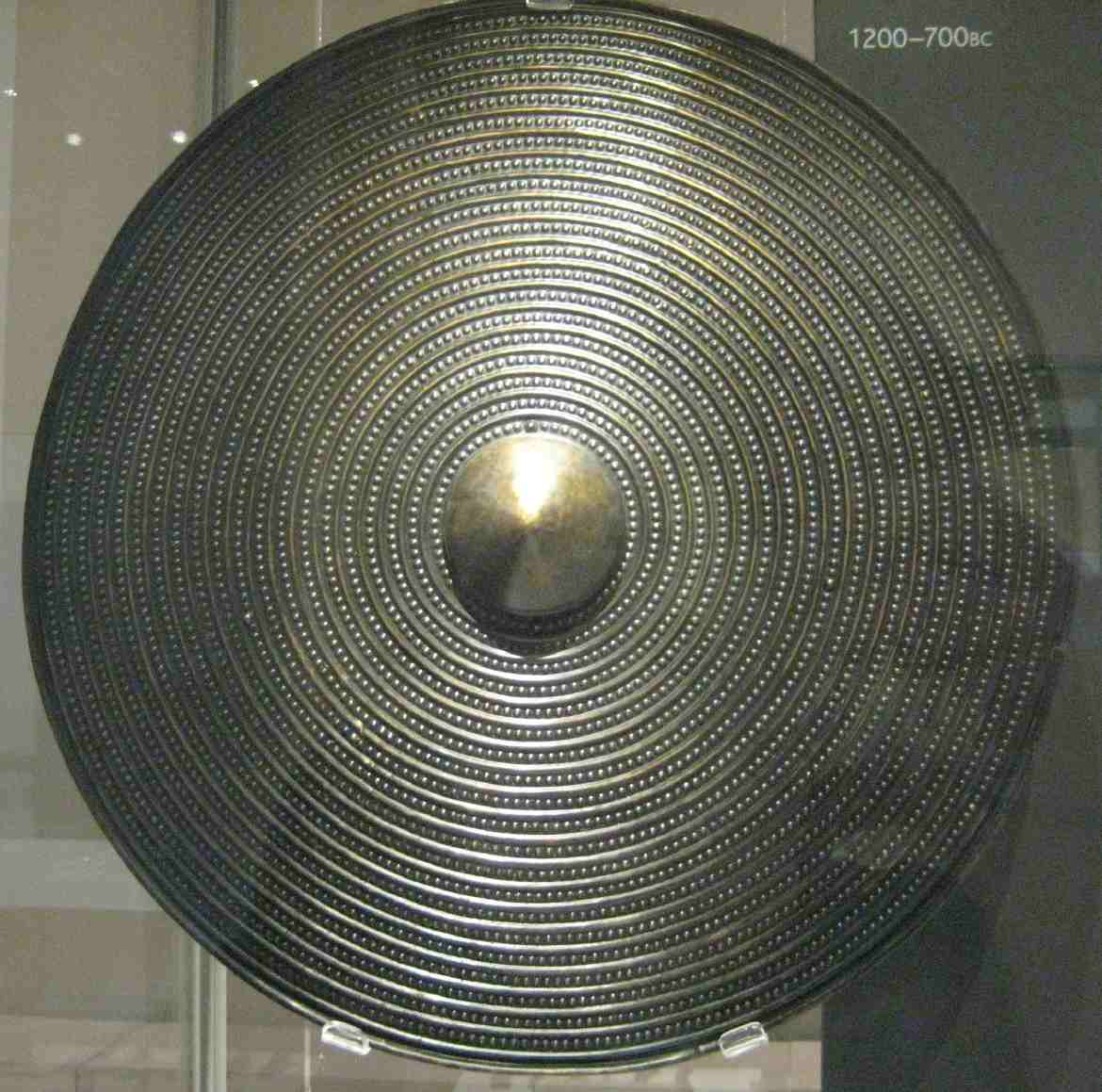
A Bronze Age shield, dated to 1200–700 BCE; Drem inherits a similar shield used by his grandfather

Warrior Scarlet was published between The Silver Branch and The Lantern Bearers, books two and three in the trilogy that begins with The Eagle of the Ninth. Those excepted, it has been described as 'perhaps (Sutcliff's) finest novel and certainly the most akin to fantasy...as powerful as possible a picture of a putative shamanistic society.'

For many years, Sutcliff lived in the village of Walberton, next to the South Downs that feature in her writing; Warrior Scarlet and her 1960 novel Knight's Fee take place in the same geographical location near Bramber in Sussex, while the central character in Eagle of the Ninth also receives a land grant on the Downs. There are several explicit connections made between the two books; in Knight's Fee, the hero Randall also helps guard sheep on the Downs and is shown an axe head made for someone 'left-handed or one-handed'.

Warrior Scarlet is the earliest of Sutcliff's 'Celtic' novels and the theme of sacrifice that appears elsewhere is here touched on only briefly. However, it does contain another common theme, that of different peoples occupying the same land and joining together over time. Drem's tribe are the 'Golden People', who took the land and subjugated its original owners or 'Little Dark People', but the shepherd Doli tells him his people were previously conquered by another tribe of 'red-gold giants', before ultimately becoming one. In the book, a travelling peddler shows his hosts an iron dagger, presaging the end of the Bronze Age and beginning of the Iron Age; like their predecessors, the dominance of Drem's own people will pass.

When she was two years old, Sutcliff contracted Still's disease, a form of juvenile rheumatoid arthritis, which left her paralysed and requiring the use of a wheelchair for much of her life. Many of her books portray a sense of being separate; its attribution to a physical handicap appears in Warrior Scarlet, as well as her later works The Witches Brat and The Flowers of Adonis.

Rudyard Kipling, who lived on the other side of the Downs near Burwash in East Sussex, was a major influence on Sutcliff, as she herself acknowledged. In Warrior Scarlet, the Little Dark People are also referred to as the 'Flint People', linking it to two stories in Kipling's 1910 collection Rewards and Fairies; these are "The Knife and the Naked Chalk" and "Song of the Men's Side."

Warrior Scarlet was runner-up for the 1958 Carnegie Medal, an award Sutcliff finally won in 1959 for The Lantern Bearers.
