= Knight's Fee (novel) =

1960 children's novel by Rosemary Sutcliff

- First edition
- Author: Rosemary Sutcliff
- Illustrator: Charles Keeping
- Cover artist: Robert Micklewright
- Language: English
- Genre: Historical novel
- Publisher: Oxford University Press
- Publication date: 1960
- Publication place: United Kingdom
- Media type: Print (Hardback)
- Pages: 237
- Preceded by: The Lantern Bearers
- Followed by: Bridge Builders

Knight's Fee is a children's historical novel written by Rosemary Sutcliff, first published in 1960. It is set in and around the South Downs in England, near the towns of Steyning and Arundel in West Sussex and covers the period 1094–1106, some 30–40 years after the Norman conquest of England in 1066.

== Plot summary ==
The title comes from 'knight's fee', a feudal system term used for a manor or land holding held by a knight, in return for providing military support to an overlord. The novel is set in the same general location near Bramber in Sussex, as Sutcliff's Warrior Scarlet (1958). The Knights Fee plot contains several references to the earlier Warrior Scarlet. As with many of Sutcliff's books, it was illustrated by Charles Keeping.

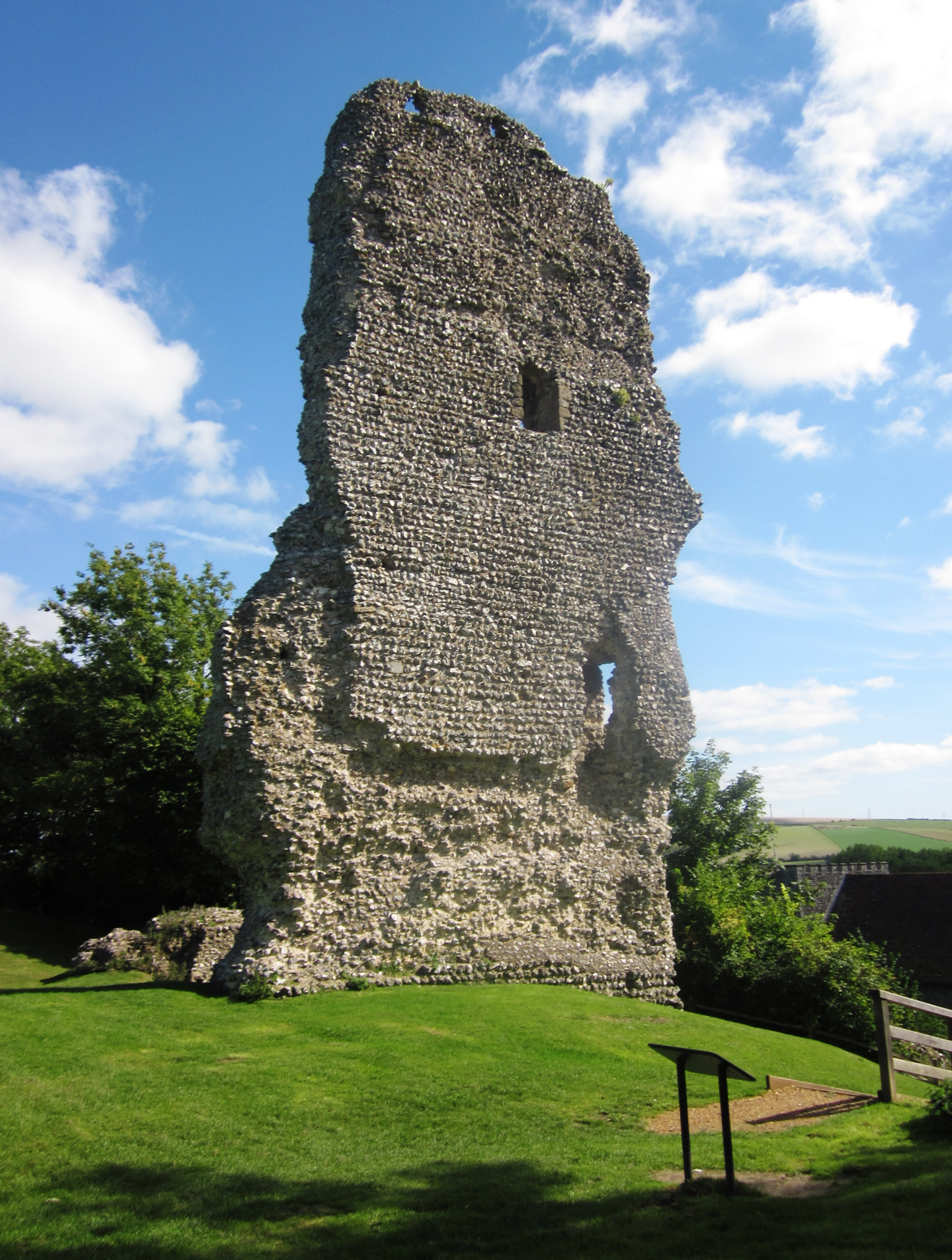
Remains of Bramber Castle, which appears in the novel

The central figure is Randall, orphan son of a Breton soldier and Saxon mother who works as a dog-boy in Arundel Castle. He is taken home by Sir Everard d'Aguillon, who holds the manor of West Dean from his feudal overlord de Braose, and is brought up with Sir Everard's grandson Bevis. The book follows the two as they grow up; when Sir Everard dies, Bevis becomes a knight and inherits the manor, with Randall as his squire. Bevis and Randall are part of the army led by Henry I against his older brother Robert Curthose in a campaign that culminates in the 1106 Battle of Tinchebray in Normandy.

The battle ends in victory for Henry's combined Norman-Saxon army, but Bevis is killed and Randall is granted the manor of Dean in return for his service. These events are hinted at earlier in the book by Bevis's foster mother Ancret, a descendant of the original inhabitants; the theme of continuation is common in Sutcliff's work. Another which appears here is the idea of emotional ties that sit alongside legal duties, such as the feudal obligations of knighthood; these bonds are often more powerful and important, since they apply to any time period, whether Bronze Age Britain or the Normans in the 11th century.

Apart from the location, explicit links between Knight's Fee and Warrior Scarlet include Randall holding a stone axehead made for someone who was left handed or 'one handed' (a reference to Drem), as well as similarities in the warrior initiation ceremony in Warrior Scarlet and Bevis becoming a knight.

Knight's Fee also depicts the response of the English people to the death of King William II of England in a hunting accident.

== Reception ==
The book was positively reviewed, critics commenting on its 'craftsmanship and perceptiveness' as well as the 'illumination of a difficult topic, Norman land tenure and the obligations of knightly service.'

== Historical background ==
As with Sutcliff's other novels, the underlying plot and major figures are historically accurate while reflecting a theme common in her writing, the continuity of the links between the land and those who live on it. In the series relating to Roman Britain and its aftermath that begins with The Eagle of the Ninth, the linking device is an emerald ring passed down through generations of the same family. Here, there are several explicit connections between Knight's Fee and Warrior Scarlet; Aquila, the central character in Eagle of the Ninth, also takes up a land grant to farm in the same area of the Downs.

Many of her books are set in the early Middle Ages, roughly 400 CE to 1000 CE; Knight's Fee and two other novels, The Shield Ring and The Witch's Brat occur at the beginning of the high mediaeval period. Sutcliff claimed in a 1974 interview she found it hard to write about later mediaeval times 'because of the terrific hold the Church had in every facet of life.' The one exception is The Chronicles of Robin Hood, which is set in the early 13th century; however, this is dictated by the period generally ascribed to the legend, while Robin is ultimately betrayed by the Church.

The Celtic idea of rulers sacrificing themselves is another recurring theme; Randall is linked to Dean by blood and ancestry but earns the right to hold it by being willing to sacrifice himself to protect it. He is accepted by the land or 'granted seisin,' a concept that also appears in her 1952 novel Brother Dusty-Feet.

The novel was influenced by Sutcliff's reading of the essay "The Arrow and the Sword" (1947) by Hugh Ross Williamson, which argued that William Rufus was covertly an adherent of a pre-Christian religion.

One of Sutcliff's major literary influences was Rudyard Kipling, whose home near Burwash in East Sussex was the setting for Puck of Pook's Hill which features Sir Richard Dalyngridge, a similar figure to Sir Everard, living in the same period. The critic Hilary Wright claims that while the plots are very different, Knight's Fee is the work most obviously influenced by him.
