= The Lantern Bearers =

The Lantern Bearers may refer to:

- The Lantern Bearers (Stevenson essay), an 1888 essay by Robert Louis Stevenson
- The Lantern Bearers (Sutcliff novel), a 1959 historical adventure novel for children by Rosemary Sutcliff
- The Lantern Bearers (Frame novel), a 2001 novel by Ronald Frame inspired by the Stevenson essay
