= The Silver Branch =

The Silver Branch may refer to:

- Silver Branch, a symbol found in Irish mythology and literature
- The Silver Branch (Sutcliff novel), a 1957 historical adventure novel for children by Rosemary Sutcliff
- The Silver Branch (Kennealy novel), a 1988 fantasy novel by Patricia Kennealy
