= The Eagle (2011 film) =

2011 film by Kevin Macdonald

- Theatrical release poster
- Directed by: Kevin Macdonald
- Screenplay by: Jeremy Brock
- Based on: The Eagle of the Ninth by Rosemary Sutcliff
- Produced by: Duncan Kenworthy
- Starring: Channing Tatum; Jamie Bell; Donald Sutherland; Mark Strong
- Cinematography: Anthony Dod Mantle
- Edited by: Justine Wright
- Music by: Atli Örvarsson
- Production companies: Toledo Productions; Film4; DMG Entertainment
- Distributed by: Focus Features (United States); Universal Pictures (International)
- Release dates: 11 February 2011 (United States); 25 March 2011 (United Kingdom)
- Running time: 114 minutes
- Countries: United States; United Kingdom
- Languages: English; Gaelic
- Budget: $25 million
- Box office: $39 million

The Eagle is a 2011 epic historical drama film set in Roman Britain directed by Kevin Macdonald, and starring Channing Tatum, Jamie Bell and Donald Sutherland. Adapted by Jeremy Brock from Rosemary Sutcliff's historical adventure novel The Eagle of the Ninth (1954), the film tells the story of a young Roman officer attempting to recover the lost Roman eagle standard of his father's legion in Caledonia. The story is based on the Ninth Spanish Legion's supposed disappearance in Britain. Historically, the purported disappearance of the Ninth Legion in Northern Britain is a subject of debate.

The film was a UK–US co-production. It was released in the United States on 11 February 2011 and in the United Kingdom on 25 March 2011. The film received mixed reviews from critics and grossed $39 million against its $25 million budget.

== Plot ==
In the year 140 AD, twenty years after the Ninth Legion of the Roman army disappeared in the north of Britain, Marcus Flavius Aquila, a young Roman centurion, arrives in Roman Britain to serve at his first post as a garrison commander. Marcus's father, who was the Senior Centurion of the ninth, disappeared with the eagle standard of the ill-fated legion, and Marcus hopes to redeem his family's honour by bravely serving in Britain. Shortly afterwards, only Marcus's alertness and decisiveness save the garrison from being overrun by Celtic tribesmen in a local insurrection. He is decorated for his bravery but honourably discharged due to a severe leg injury.

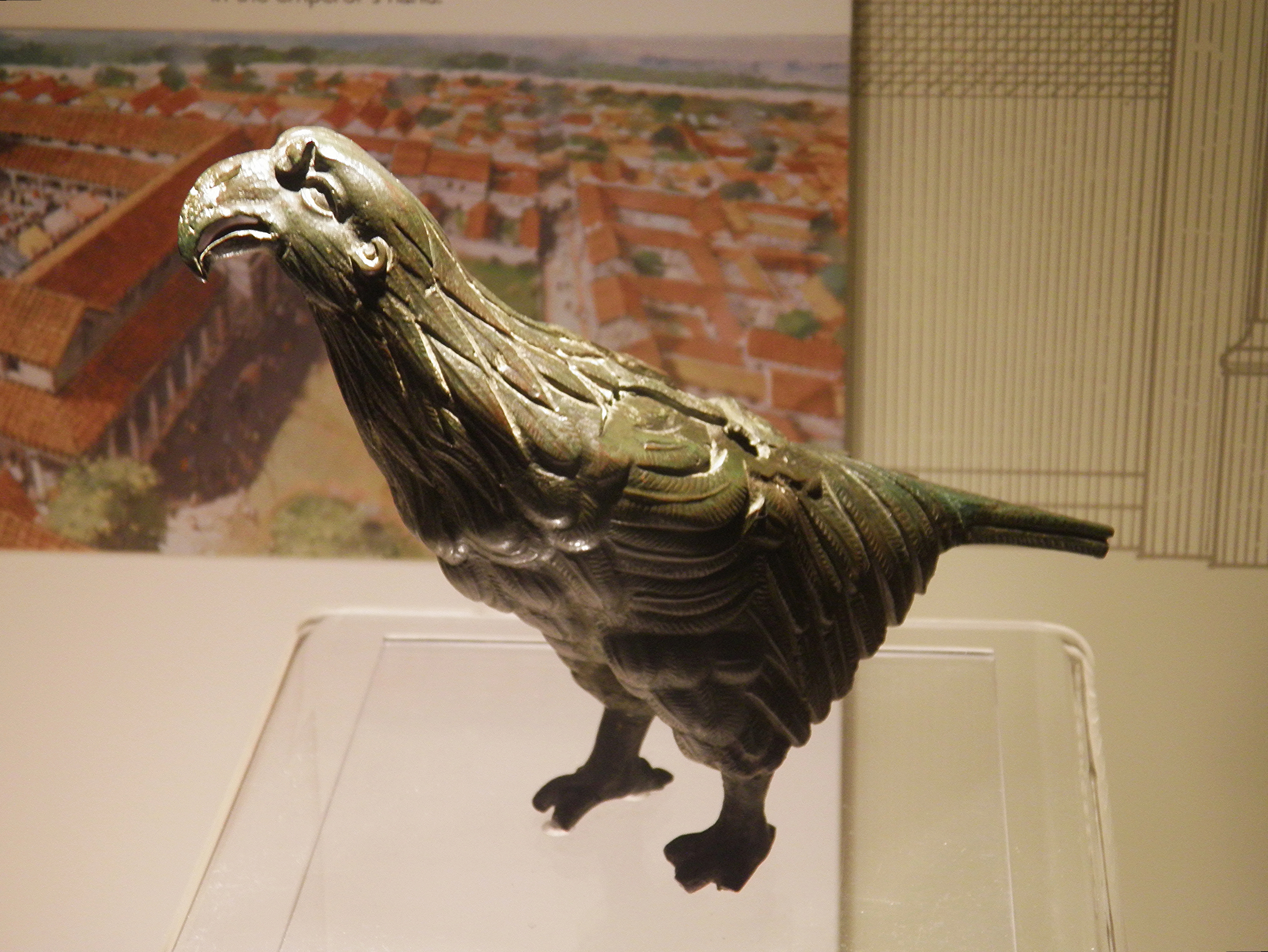
The Silchester eagle, found in the Roman ruins at Silchester in Hampshire, inspired the original The Eagle of the Ninth novel

Living at his uncle's estate near Calleva (modern Silchester) in southern Britain, Marcus has to cope with his military career having been cut short and his father's name still being held in disrepute. Hearing rumours that the eagle standard has been seen in the north of Britain, Marcus decides to recover it. Despite the warnings of his uncle and his fellow Romans, who believe that no Roman can survive north of Hadrian's Wall, he travels north into the territory of the Picts, accompanied only by his slave, Esca. The son of a deceased chieftain of the Brigantes, Esca detests Rome and what it stands for, but considers himself bound to Marcus, who saved his life during an amphitheatre show.

After several weeks of travelling through the northern wilderness, Esca and Marcus encounter Guern, a Roman-born Lucius Caius Metellus, one of the survivors of the Ninth Legion, who attributes his survival to the hospitality of the Selgovae tribe. Guern recalls that all but a small number of deserters were killed in an ambush by the northern tribes – including Esca's Brigantes – and that the eagle standard was taken away by the Seal People, the most vicious of the tribes. The two travel further north until they are found by the Seal People. Identifying himself as a chieftain's son fleeing Roman rule and claiming Marcus as his slave, Esca is welcomed by the tribe. After allowing the Seal People to mistreat Marcus, Esca eventually reveals that his actions were a ploy and helps his master to find the eagle. As they retrieve it, they are ambushed by several warriors, including the chief of the tribe. Marcus and Esca manage to kill them. Prior to dying, the chief reveals that he killed Marcus's father, who apparently begged for his life. Furthermore, the chief is revealed to be wearing Marcus's father's ring. Marcus does not understand Celtic and asks Esca to translate, but Esca never reveals the fate of Marcus's father. With the aid of the chief's young grandson, they escape from the village.

The two flee south in an effort to reach Hadrian's Wall, with the chief's son, the Seal Prince, in pursuit. Marcus, slowed by his old battle wound, orders Esca to take the eagle back to Roman territory and even grants the reluctant slave his freedom. Freed, Esca still refuses to abandon his friend and instead heads out to look for help. He returns with the survivors of the Ninth Legion just as the Seal People catch up with them. Guern reveals to Marcus that he saw Marcus's father die. He assures Marcus that his father was not a coward and fought to the end. The legionaries, wishing to redeem themselves, accept Aquila as their commander and prepare to defend the eagle standard. As an example to those who would betray their people, the Seal prince kills his own son in front of Esca, Marcus, and the legionaries. He then orders his warriors to attack. A battle ensues, in which all the Seal warriors are killed, along with most of the Ninth Legion soldiers, including Guern. Marcus kills the Seal prince by drowning him in the river. With the enemy defeated, the bodies of both Britons and Romans are laid out by the victors. As Marcus commends their valour, he lights a funeral pyre for Guern. As Guern is cremated, Marcus, Esca and the few survivors of the Ninth return to Roman territory, where Aquila delivers the eagle to the astonished governor in Londinium. There is some talk of the Ninth Legion being reformed with Marcus as its commander. But when Marcus and Esca wonder what they will do next, Marcus leaves the decision to Esca.

=== Alternative ending ===
An alternative ending is featured in the home media release. Marcus decides to burn the eagle standard on the altar where the final battle occurred, instead of delivering it to the Roman governor. He tells Esca that he does this because the eagle belongs to the men who fought for it. Marcus and Esca are then shown approaching Hadrian's Wall on foot and talking about their plans for the future.

== Main cast ==
- Channing Tatum as Marcus Flavius Aquila
- Jamie Bell as Esca
- Donald Sutherland as Marcus's Uncle Aquila
- Mark Strong as Guern / Lucius Caius Metellus
- Tahar Rahim as Prince of the Seal People
- Denis O'Hare as Centurion Lutorius
- Douglas Henshall as Cradoc
- Paul Ritter as Galba
- Dakin Matthews as Legate Claudius
- Pip Carter as Tribune Placidus
- Ned Dennehy as Chief of the Seal People
- Thomas Henry as the Seal Prince's son

== Production ==
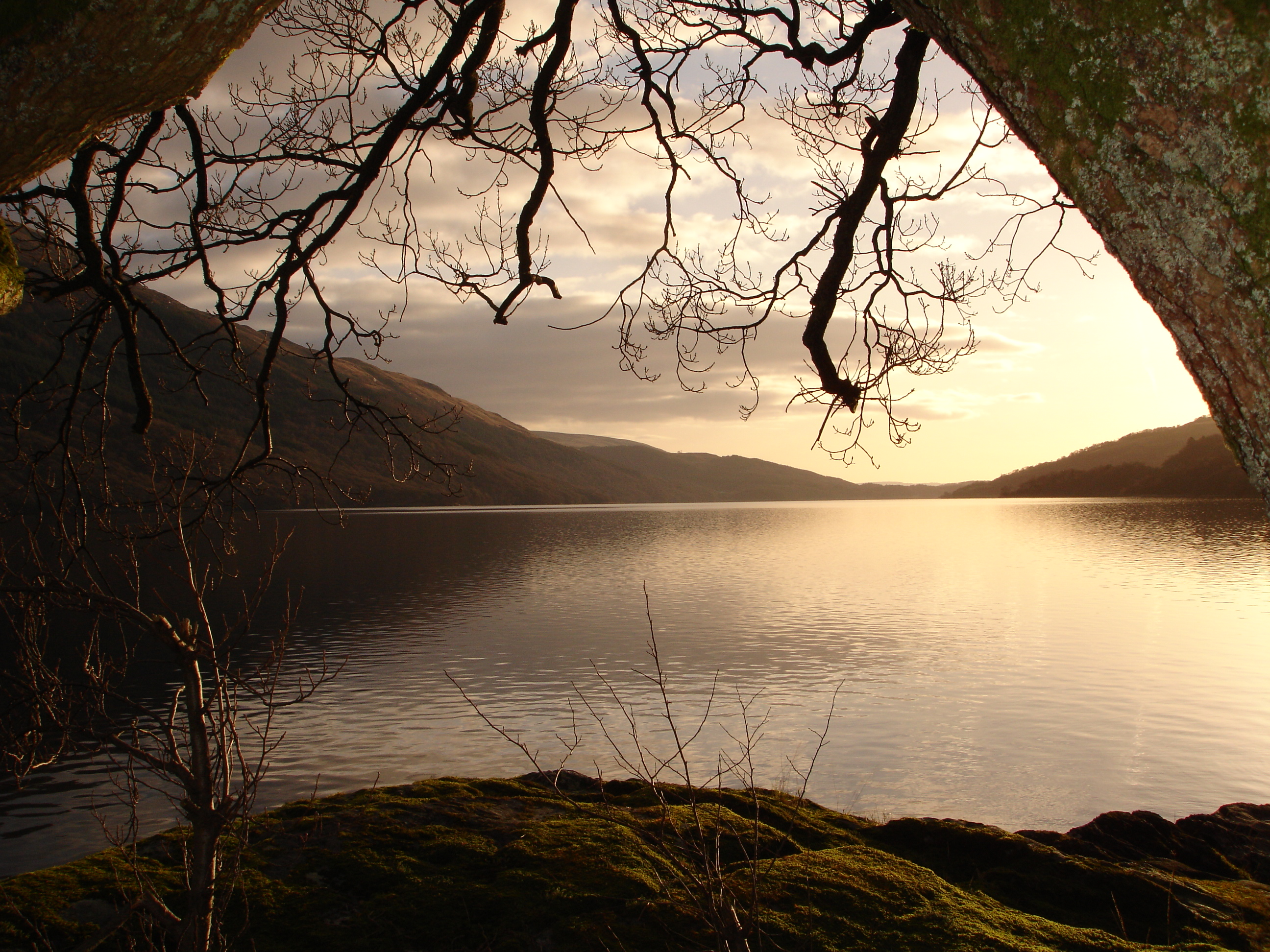
Filming took place at Loch Lomond, among other locations.

Principal photography began on 24 August 2009 in Hungary, which doubles for what was later to become England. In October, production moved to Scotland, where filming took place in Wester Ross and at Loch Lomond, among other locations. The film was made for around £15 million by producer Duncan Kenworthy's Toledo Productions for co-financiers Focus Features and Film4. Kevin Macdonald directed from a script by Jeremy Brock, who adapted the 1954 historical adventure novel of the same name by Rosemary Sutcliff. The director of photography was Anthony Dod Mantle, production design was by Michael Carlin, the costume design was by Michael O'Connor, and Justine Wright edited the film—her fifth for Macdonald. At the 62nd Cannes Film Festival in May 2009, The Eagle of the Ninth secured distribution deals "for every global market".

Macdonald intended the film to be historically authentic, but as little is certain about the tribes that the Romans encountered—they were generally Celtic peoples, though some may have been Picts—he made concessions. For example, the tribespeople spoke Gaelic, even though the language probably did not enter widespread use in the region until the 5th century AD; Pictish is the more likely language to have been spoken at the time. "It's the best we can do," Macdonald said. "All you can do is build on a few clues and trust your own instincts. That way, no one can tell you you were wrong." Only 1% of Scots speak Gaelic, limiting the talent pool to just 60,000 people. By August 2009, several Gaelic-speaking boys had auditioned for the role of a boy of the Seal people, aged nine to twelve, but without success, so Macdonald held open auditions in Glasgow for the role. It was eventually given to nine-year-old Thomas Henry from New Barnsley, Belfast, who had been educated in Irish Gaelic.

Macdonald described his view of the Seal people:

They were a more indigenous folk than the Celts, who were from farther south ... They were probably small and dark, like the Inouit [sic], living off seals and dressed in sealskins. We are going to create a culture about which no one knows much, but which we will make as convincing as possible. We are basing it on clues gained from places like Skara Brae and the Tomb of the Eagles in Orkney, so that we will have them worshipping pagan symbols, like the seal and the eagle. The reason they have seized the emblem of the Roman eagle from the legion is because to them it [was] a sacred symbol.

Achiltibuie, a village in northwest Scotland, was used as a filming location for the "Seal People". Filming started in Achiltibuie on 7 October 2009 and finished on 15 October 2009. The main location was Fox Point, Old Dornie. The Pictish village which was constructed at Fox Point was used on most days of the filming. Other sites included Achnahaird beach, where a horse chase was filmed, and Loch Lurgainn. Macdonald intended to use locals as extras. This was a success with many locals appearing as extras after going to castings in nearby Ullapool. Their roles included "Seal Warriors", "Seal Princesses" and "Elders".

In a reversal of the convention in historical films in which Roman characters are typically portrayed with British or upper-class English accents, director Kevin Macdonald stated that the Romans were largely played by American actors, while Rome’s enemies were portrayed by British actors. British actors Paul Ritter, Mark Strong and Pip Carter adopted American accents for their Roman roles, while Jamie Bell used an English accent. Macdonald stated that the use of American-accented Romans was intended to create a degree of contemporary symbolism linked to the Iraq War.

According to Channing Tatum, the actors trained 4–5 hours a day for each role.

Although the film mostly stuck to the plot of Sutcliff's novel, there were a few modifications and condensations, e.g. it introduced a few violent scenes into what had been a novel written for younger children.

== Release ==
=== Critical reception ===
On review aggregator Rotten Tomatoes the film holds approval rating of 39% based on 160 reviews, with an average rating of 5.30/10. The website's critics consensus reads: "The Eagle has a pleasantly traditional action-adventure appeal, but it's drowned out by Kevin Macdonald's stolid direction and Channing Tatum's uninspired work in the central role." Metacritic gave the film a weighted average score of 55 out of 100, based on 35 critics, indicating "mixed or average reviews". Audiences polled by CinemaScore gave the film an average grade of "C+" on an A+ to F scale.

Roger Ebert gave The Eagle three stars out of four, saying that "it evokes the energy of traditional sword-and-shield movies" and praising its realistic battle scenes and limited use of CGI.

=== Box office ===
The Eagle grossed $19.5 million in the United States and Canada as well as in other territories, for a worldwide total of $39 million, against a production budget of $25 million.

In the United States, The Eagle was released on 11 February 2011, in 2,296 theatres. It grossed $8,684,464 during its opening weekend, ranking fourth behind Gnomeo & Juliet, Justin Bieber: Never Say Never and Just Go With It.

=== Home media ===
The Eagle was released on DVD and Blu-ray Disc on 21 June 2011.

== See also ==
- The Eagle of the Ninth
- Centurion, a 2010 film with similar themes.
- Legio IX Hispana
- 2011 in film
- Survival film
