= Knights fee =

Knights fee may refer to:

- Knight's fee, a unit measure of land deemed sufficient to support a knight in feudal England
- Knight's Fee (novel), a 1960 children's historical novel by Rosemary Sutcliff
