= Silchester eagle =

Roman eagle statue

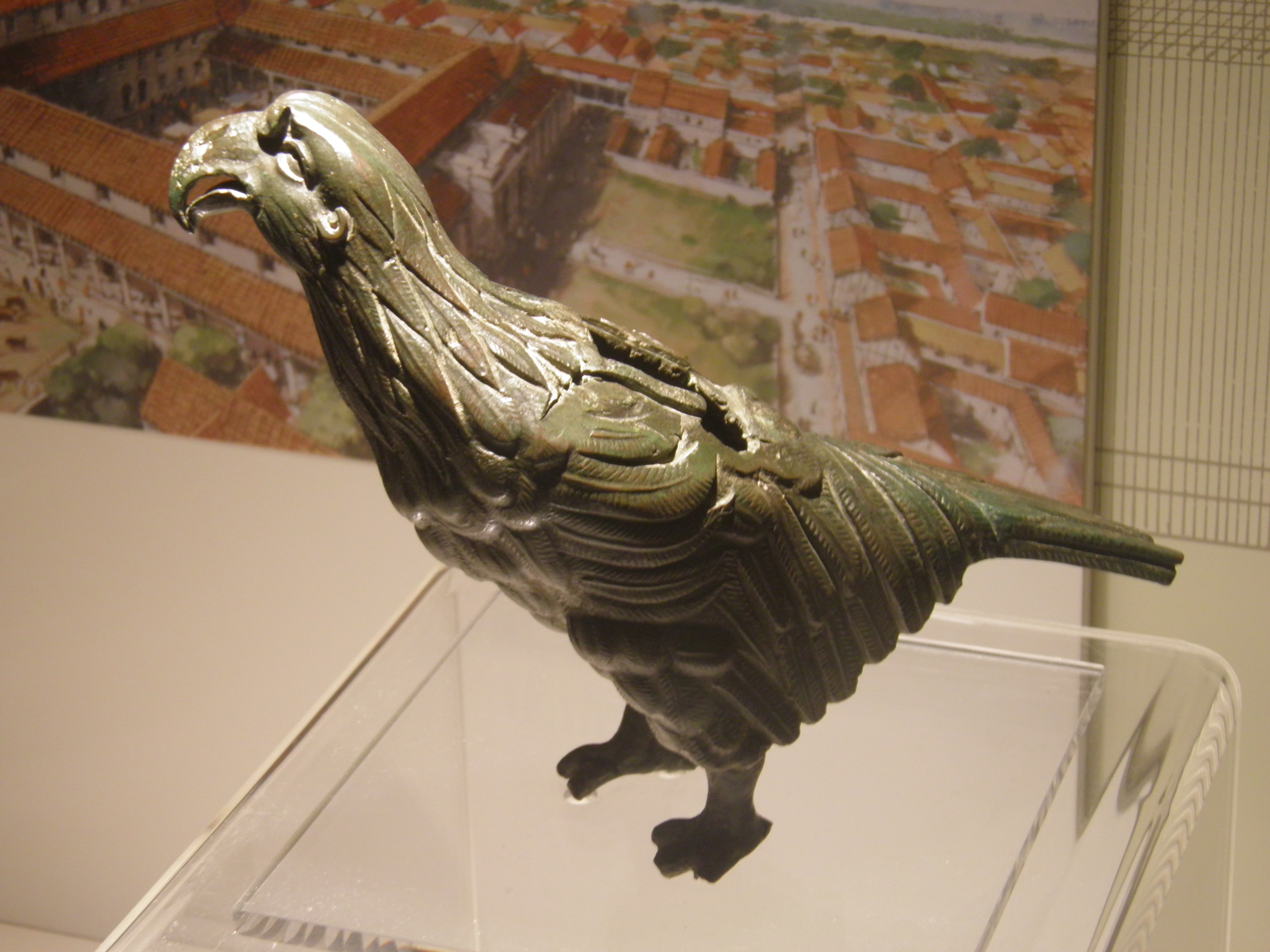
- The Silchester eagle
- Material: Bronze
- Size: 6 inches (15 cm) high
- Created: 1st or 2nd century CE
- Period/culture: Roman
- Discovered: 9 October 1866; Calleva Atrebatum
- Discovered by: James Gerald Joyce
- Present location: Reading Museum
- Identification: REDMG : 1995.4.1

The Silchester eagle is a Roman bronze casting dating from the first or second century CE, uncovered in 1866 at Calleva Atrebatum in Silchester, Hampshire, England. It was purchased in 1980 by Reading Museum in Berkshire where it remains on display as of 2024.

== History ==
The Silchester eagle was discovered, wingless and damaged, on 9 October 1866 by the Reverend J. G. Joyce during the excavation of a Roman basilica where it was likely part of a larger statue. It stands approximately 6 inches (15 cm) high and has a hollow space inside which was accessed through a (now missing) square lid located on the top of the back of the bird. The curve of the feet suggests that the eagle's talons had grasped a globe that was probably held in the hand of a statue, possibly of Jupiter.

It was found buried in a layer of charred wood, leading the discoverer to believe that it might have been the sacred eagle of a Roman legion and had been hidden for safekeeping in the rafters of the aerarium (treasury). However, more recent archaeologists have suggested that the piece may have been intended as nothing more than scrap metal by the Romans at the time that it was lost, and was awaiting being recycled when the aerarium burnt down.

== Legacy ==
Rosemary Sutcliffe's historical novel The Eagle of the Ninth was inspired in part by the Silchester eagle.

A plaster copy of the Silchester eagle was 3D scanned in 2022. It is accessible on Sketchfab.

== See also ==
- The Eagle of the Ninth, the 1954 novel by Rosemary Sutcliff that was inspired by the Silchester eagle
- The Eagle, the 2011 film based on the novel
