= Achnahaird =

Settlement in Ross and Cromarty, Scotland

Coordinates: 58°3′57″N 5°22′43″W

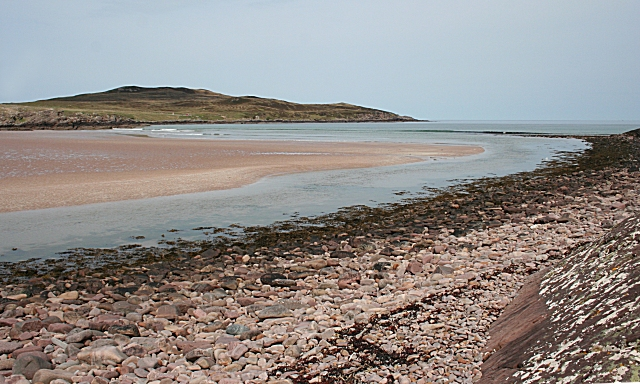
Achnahaird Bay, looking across the bay where Allt Loch Raa enters the sea. The low hill on the other side of the bay is the imaginatively named Cnoc Mòr ('big lump')

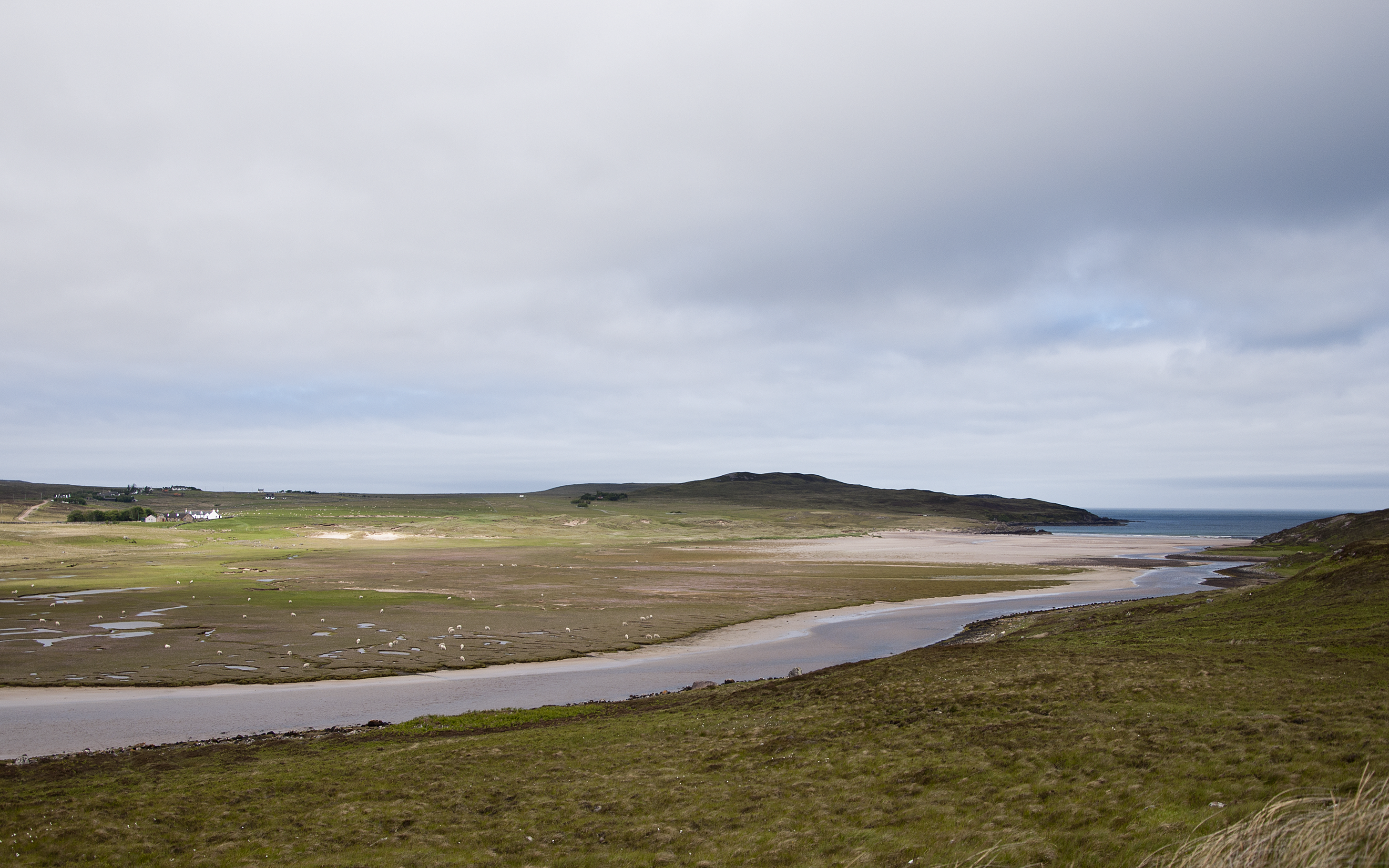
Achnahaird Bay

Achnahaird (Scottish Gaelic: Achadh na h-Àirde) is a small settlement on Achnahaird Bay in Ross and Cromarty, in the Scottish council area of Highland.

The beach at Achnahaird Bay was used in the filming of 'The Eagle' (directed by Kevin Macdonald).
