= The Shield Ring =

1956 children's historical novel by Rosemary Sutcliff

- First edition
- Author: Rosemary Sutcliff
- Illustrator: C. Walter Hodges
- Language: English
- Genre: Historical novel
- Publisher: OUP
- Publication date: 1956
- Publication place: United Kingdom
- Media type: Print (Hardback)
- Pages: 213
- Preceded by: Sword Song

The Shield Ring is a 1956 historical novel for children written by Rosemary Sutcliff. It is the last in a sequence of novels, chronologically started with The Eagle of the Ninth, loosely tracing a family of the Roman Empire, then Britain, and finally Norse-Britain, who inherit an emerald seal ring bearing the insignia of a dolphin.

It takes place during the Norman Rule of Britain, and tells the story of resistance against the Norman Conquest in the Lake District and North West England. Like many Sutcliff novels, the story of the characters unfold against a background of multi-cultural conflict and change.

== Plot summary ==
The story revolves around Frytha and Bjorn, a girl and a boy who have both been orphaned by the Norman conquest, and have sought refuge and been taken in by Jarl Buthar in his hidden Lakeland settlement by Buthar's Mere. The group is portrayed as Northmen settlers who have long established themselves in the area, and are resisting Norman advances into their country. They describe themselves as forming their shield ring up in the fells of Lakeland, as a form of Last Stand against the Norman invasion. The theme of this Shield Ring is developed throughout the story and ultimately portrayed as an ethic of loyalty to one's group, even unto death.

Bjorn is fostered to a Harp player, an old man who originally fought the Normans at Hastings, who refers to being part of that Shield Wall resisting William the Conqueror. The instrument becomes a key feature of the narrative, being a symbolic link to the indigenous Welsh and British peoples with whom the Norse of Lakeland have intermingled. Bjorn is seen as having the musical gift from his maternal Celtic forebears, and learns to play as he grows up. This links him back to the family of the emerald seal ring with the dolphin insignia, which he is given when he comes of age.

Frytha is shown as being very close to Bjorn, as she adapts from her original Saxon upbringing to be part of the Norse settlement. The story develops with a paralleling to the epic of Beowulf, with Frytha making connections between events in their life and in the epic. The Northmen successfully fend off a series of Norman attempts to overrun Lakeland, but the story comes to its crux when Ranulf le Meschin leads the largest and seemingly final attack, coming down from Cockermouth. Bjorn is sent as a spy, under the guise of a traveling harper, to reconnoiter the enemy camp, and Frytha sneaks off to accompany him, referencing how even Beowulf had Wiglaf come to his aid when Beowulf faced his doom.

They succeed in infiltrating the enemy camp, and gather much information, but are ultimately discovered when the emerald seal ring is recognized by a Norman knight who had previously had a life-and-death struggle with Bjorn. Bjorn is subjected to torture by fire, paralleling Beowulf's downfall to a firedrake, and successfully resists. The whole concept of the Shield Wall being a spirit of resistance and unity within the band is brought into direct focus during his ordeal. Bjorn and Frytha soon escape, and return to bring the needed news to their people. With this information, the Northmen mislead the Norman host into an annihilating ambush in Rannerdale.

Although being her own inimitable take on the story of Jarl Buthar's guerilla campaign and a final battle at Rannerdale between the Normans and the Anglo-Scandinavian Cumbrians led by the Jarl, Sutcliff's novel was clearly inspired by the dramatized history written by Lakeland historian Nicholas Size, called "The Secret Valley: The Real Romance of Unconquered Lakeland" (pub. 1930)

Being the second novel written in the series of eight novels about the evolution of a British bloodline throughout the ages, it is the last in chronological order. It closes with the characters facing a world of change and persevering in their loyalty to their culture and to each other.
