= Rannerdale Knotts =

Hill in the Lake District, Cumbria of the United Kingdom

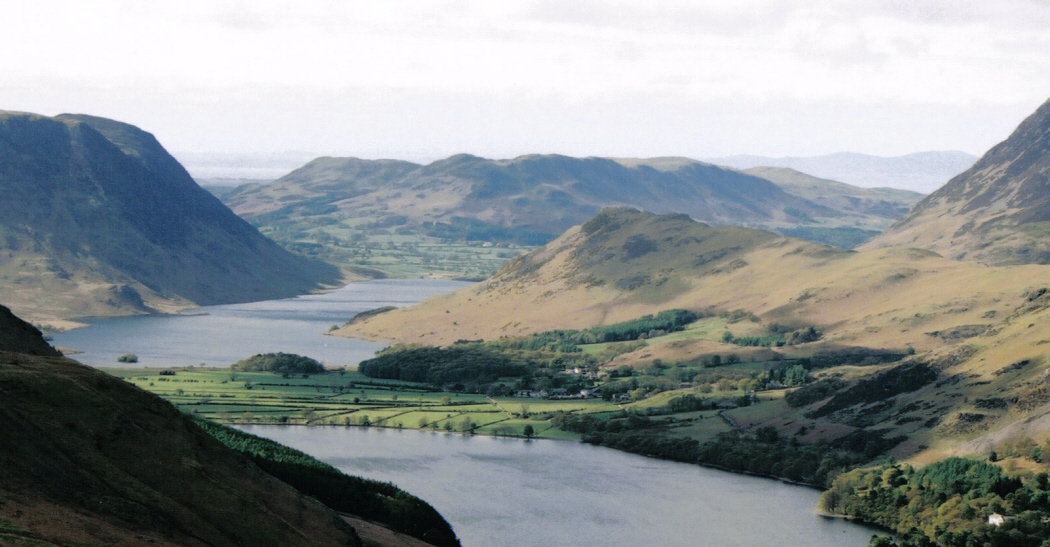
- Rannerdale Knotts (centre right) from Haystacks

Highest point
- Elevation: 355 m (1,165 ft)
- Prominence: c. 70 m
- Parent peak: Crag Hill
- Listing: Wainwright
- Coordinates: 54°33′08″N 3°17′22″W

Geography
- Location within the Lake District
- Location: Cumbria, England
- Parent range: Lake District, North Western Fells
- OS grid: NY167182
- Topo map: OS Landranger 89, Explorer OL4

Rannerdale Knotts is a fell in the Lake District of Cumbria, England. Rising from the Buttermere valley, it is one of the smaller Cumbrian hills and is overlooked by a number of surrounding fells, such as Grasmoor, Whiteless Pike and, across Crummock Water, Mellbreak and the High Stile ridge. In modern legend Rannerdale Knotts is said to be the site of a battle between the native Cumbrians and Norsemen and the invading Normans in the late 11th or early 12th century.

== Topography ==
The North Western Fells occupy the area between the rivers Derwent and Cocker, a broadly oval swathe of hilly country, elongated on a north-south axis. Two roads cross from east to west, dividing the fells into three convenient groups. The central sector, rising between Whinlatter Pass and Newlands Pass, includes Whiteless Pike.

The highest ground in the North Western Fells is an east-west ridge in this central sector, beginning with Grasmoor above Crummock Water and then gradually descending eastwards over Crag Hill, Sail, Scar Crags and Causey Pike. Grasmoor has the greatest elevation, but Crag Hill stands at the hub of the range. It sends out a subsidiary ridge to the south west, stepping down over Wandope and Whiteless Pike toward Buttermere village. Just above the village this ridge then turns sharply north west and rises to the summit of Rannerdale Knotts.

The sharp angle in the ridge is marked by a depression at 950 ft (290 m), beyond which the ground climbs slowly for around a mile toward the top. This section of the fell is named Low Bank on Ordnance Survey maps and is clad primarily in bracken. The final section bears a series of rocky knolls, still rising slowly north westward. A tumbling descent of crag and scree then follows as the end of the ridge drops steeply to the valley floor, halfway along the shore of Crummock Water. Rannerdale farm lies below this terminal face.

The south western side of Rannerdale Knotts is bounded first by Mill Beck, running through Buttermere village, and then by Crummock Water. The north eastern flank falls to Squat Beck, a feeder of Rannerdale Beck. High Rannerdale lies within the angle of the ridge between Whiteless Pike and Rannerdale Knotts, Rannerdale proper being a triangular patch of pasture constrained by Rannerdale Knotts, Grasmoor and Crummock Water.

== Geology ==
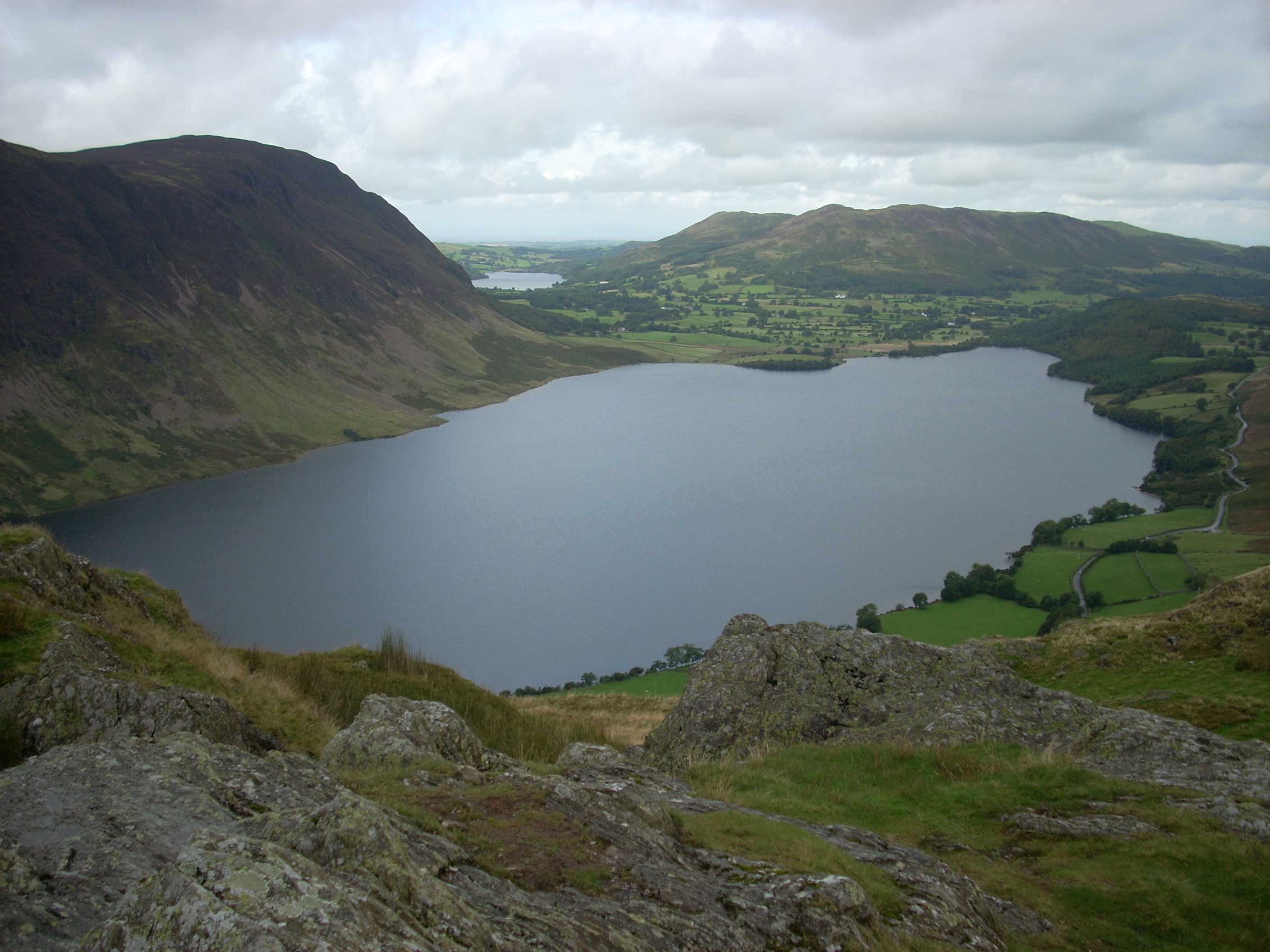
View of Crummock Water

The summit area shows outcropping of the Kirkstile Formation. These Ordovician rocks, typical of the Skiddaw massif, are composed of laminated mudstone and siltstone. Low Bank lies across the Causey Pike Fault and is part of the Buttermere Formation, an olistostrome of disrupted sheared and folded mudstone, siltstone and sandstone. There are also two minor intrusions of basalt running across the ridgeline.

There is a trial level in the northern crags, above Hause Point on the Crummock Water road. The opening is about 5 ft (1.5 m) square but the level extends only a little way into the fell-side. The object appears to have been lead-bearing galena of which some traces remain.

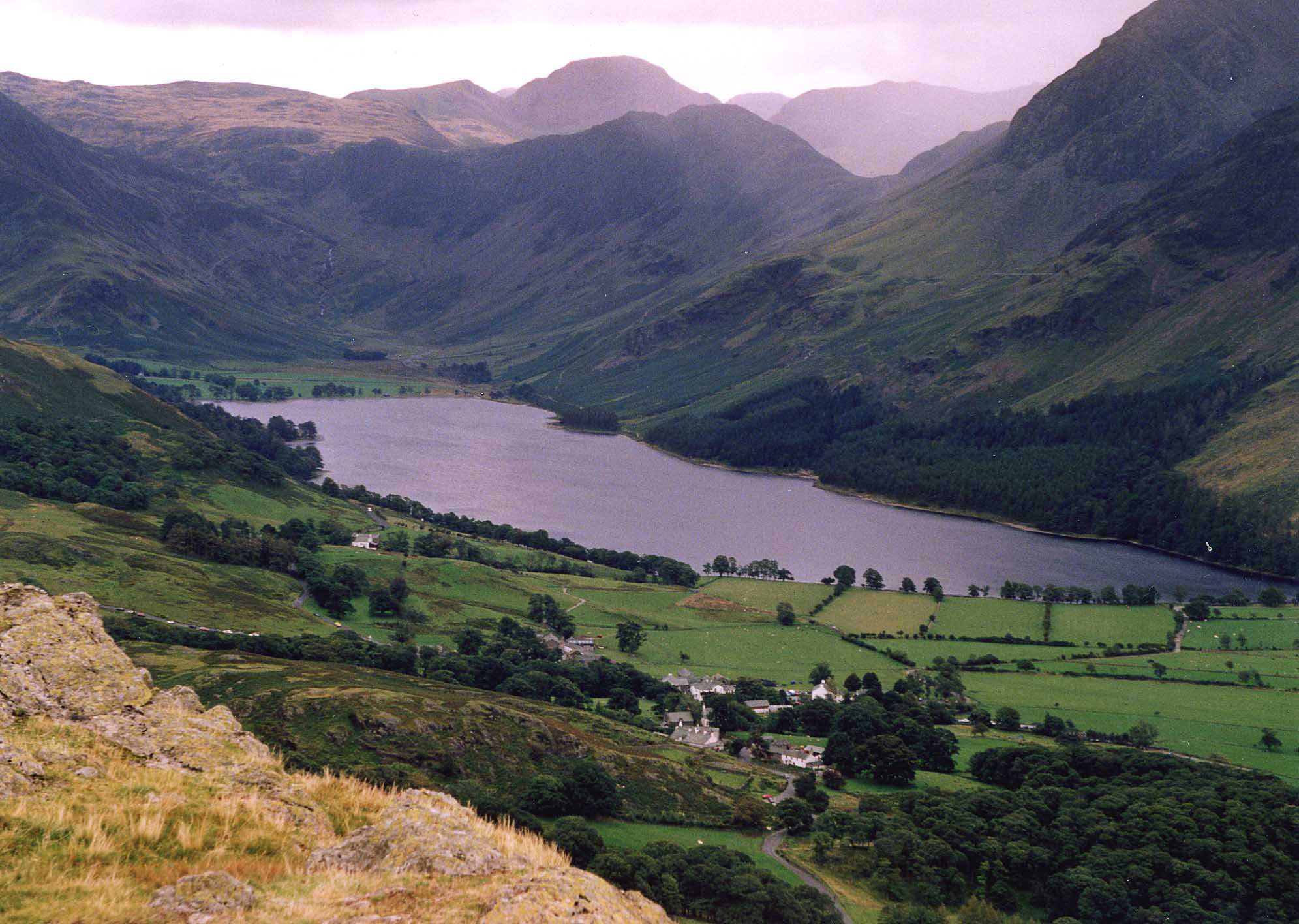
View from the summit of Rannerdale Knotts with Buttermere village and lake in the foreground with the fells of Haystacks and Great Gable behind

== Summit ==
The small tidy summit on the highest rock knoll bears a cairn. The view is limited by the circle of higher fells, but the vista of Buttermere backed by Great Gable is excellent. Crummock Water can also be brought into view by taking a few paces westward.

== Ascents ==
Rannerdale Knotts is often ascended from Buttermere, making use of the good path going up Whiteless Pike, before turning west north-west along Low Bank at the col at 950 ft (290 m). There is a more direct ascent up the west face of the fell from Hause Point at Rannerdale, accessed from the B5289 road on the eastern shore of Crummock Water. A larger circuit of Rannerdale can also be made, taking in Grasmoor, Crag Hill, Wandope, Whiteless Pike and Rannerdale Knotts.

== Norse settlement and Norman conquest ==
The Buttermere area does not appear in the Domesday Book, which indicates that this part of Cumbria was not under Norman control in 1086. The central area of the Lake District is known to have been populated by the earlier Norse invaders in the early 10th century, and dale is etymologically Norse. Cumbria was ostensibly part of Scotland, until seized by the forces of William Rufus in 1092, following a dispute with Scottish king Malcolm III, himself killed a year later at the Battle of Alnwick.

William Rufus gave Norman nobleman Ranulph les Meschines lands in Cumbria following this conquest of the area. When Ranulph les Meschines became Earl of Chester, his Cumbrian estates were returned to the Crown. Around 1120, Henry I of England gave the Barony of Copeland to Ranulph's brother William les Meschines, who settled at Egremont on Cumbria's western coast, then initiated the construction of the castle there.

=== In fiction ===
Local historian and publican Nicholas Size published a historical novel in 1930 called The Secret Valley, which tells the story of how this area resisted the Norman invaders in the 50 years after the 1066 Norman invasion. According to this novel, the Norman army was ambushed and defeated by the native Britons and Norsemen at the Battle of Rannerdale. Rosemary Sutcliff re-treated Size's ideas in The Shield Ring. Size's and Sutcliff's versions of the story are fictional, a romanticised tale of the last stand of the natives against the invading force. Size imagines a Norman army under the command of Ranulf Meschin, Earl of Carlisle, advanced south from Cockermouth. The local warriors were commanded by the Earl Boethar, who succeeded in drawing the Normans into the side valley of Rannerdale, then routed them with a surprise attack from above and behind. In Size's version, Ranulf Meschin escaped and lived in disgrace until he succeeded a relative as Earl of Chester in 1120. (In fact, he continued as lord of Cumberland until 1120, when he was promoted to become the Earl of Chester.)

The battle is imagined to have taken place in the side valley of Rannerdale, which runs east of the summit of the fell, west of Whiteless Pike and south of Grasmoor. Bluebells grow in profusion in this valley in April and May. According to local folklore, the bluebells are said to have sprung from the spilt blood of the slain Norman warriors.

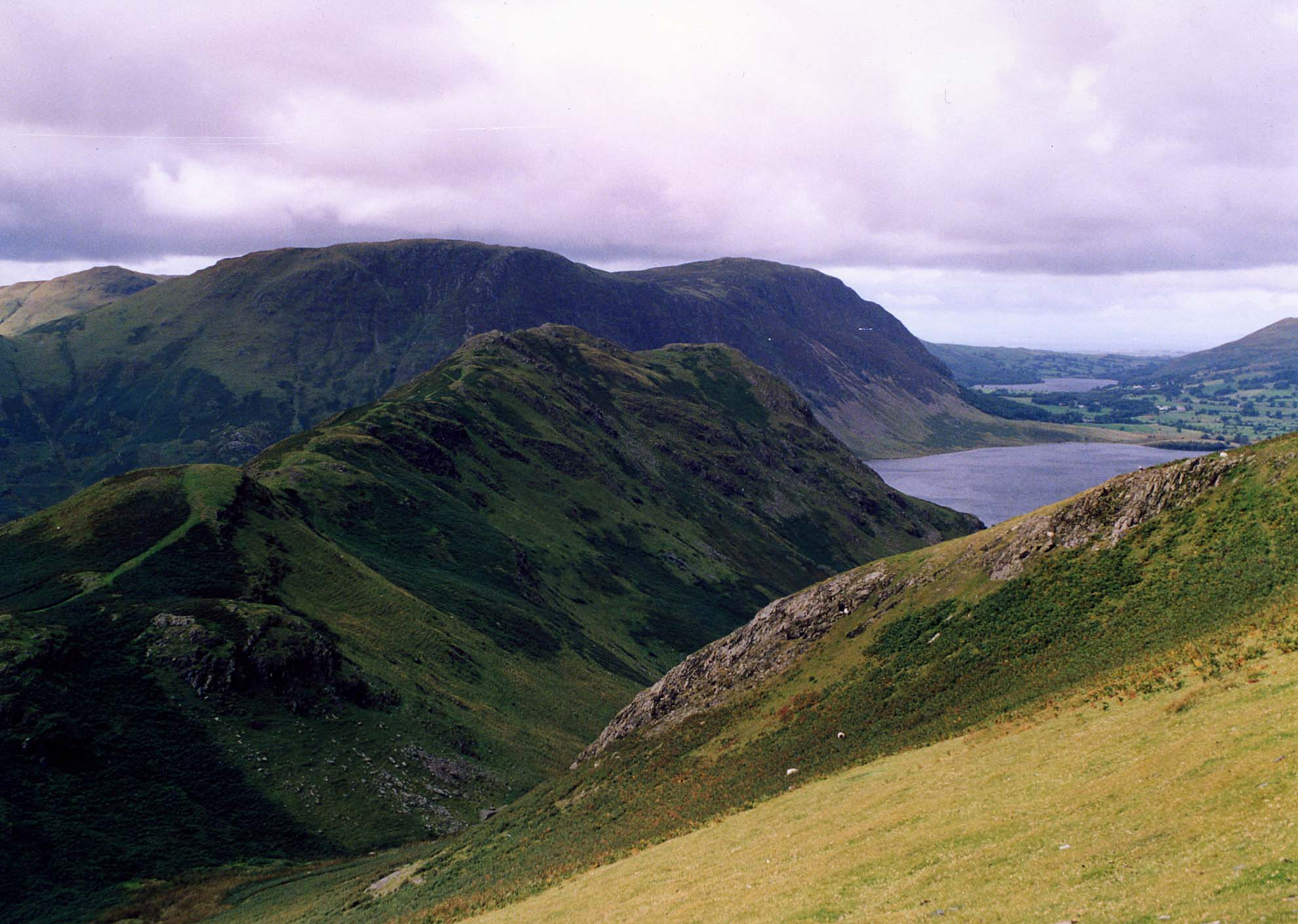
Rannerdale Knotts seen across Rannerdale from the slopes of Whiteless Pike with the fell of Mellbreak in the background.

Size himself died aged 86, having negotiated fiercely with the local district council to be buried on the fells. His grave overlooks Rannerdale. His epitaph reads:

No tombstone virtues will ornament my grave
No over-confidence about salvation,
Write me down one that loved his fellow men
And was a credit to his generation.

== See also ==
- History of Cumbria
- Etymology of Cumbrian Place Names
