= Aquila (Roman) =

Roman military standard

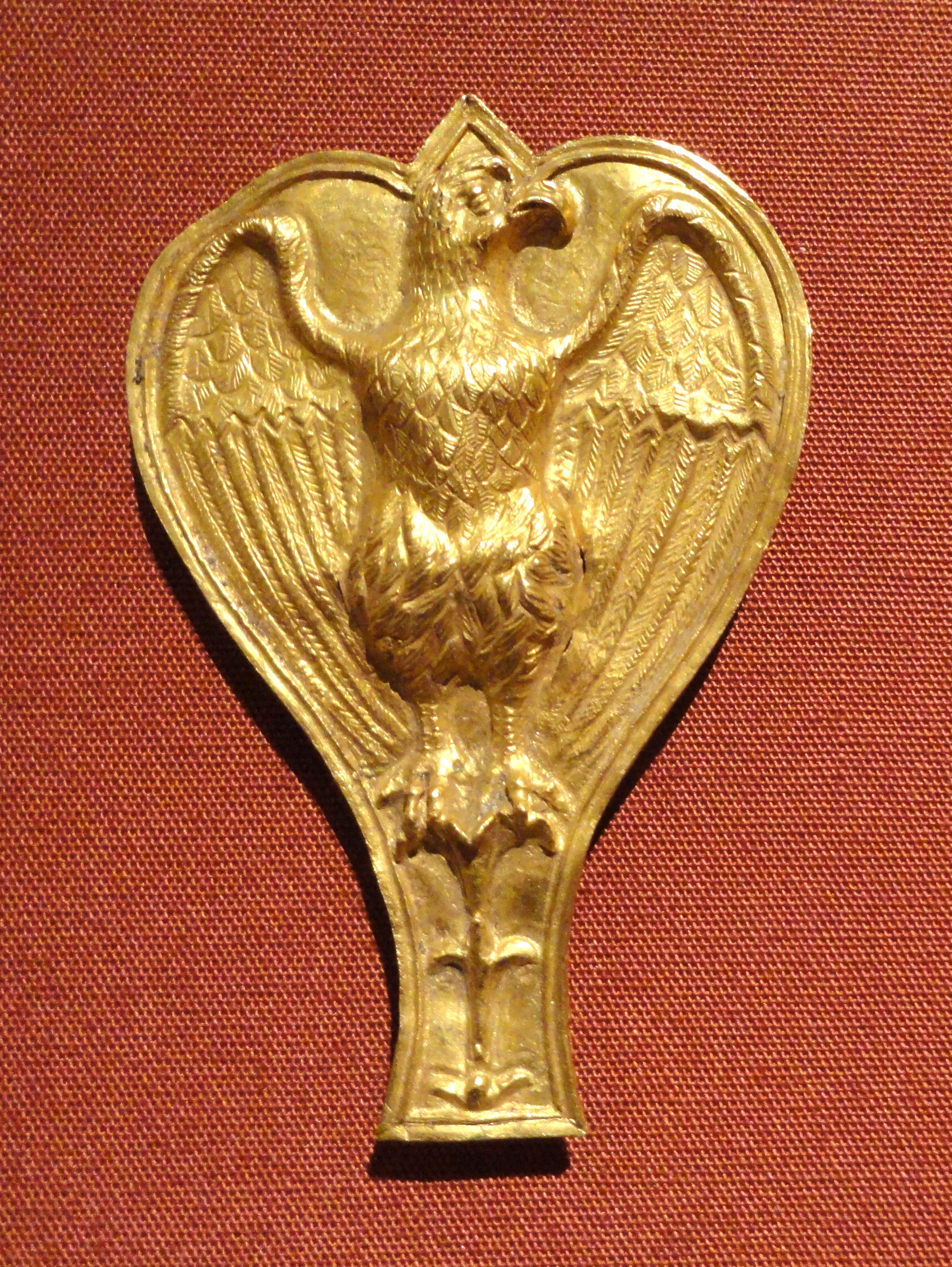
Roman ornament with an aquila (100–200 AD) from the Cleveland Museum of Art

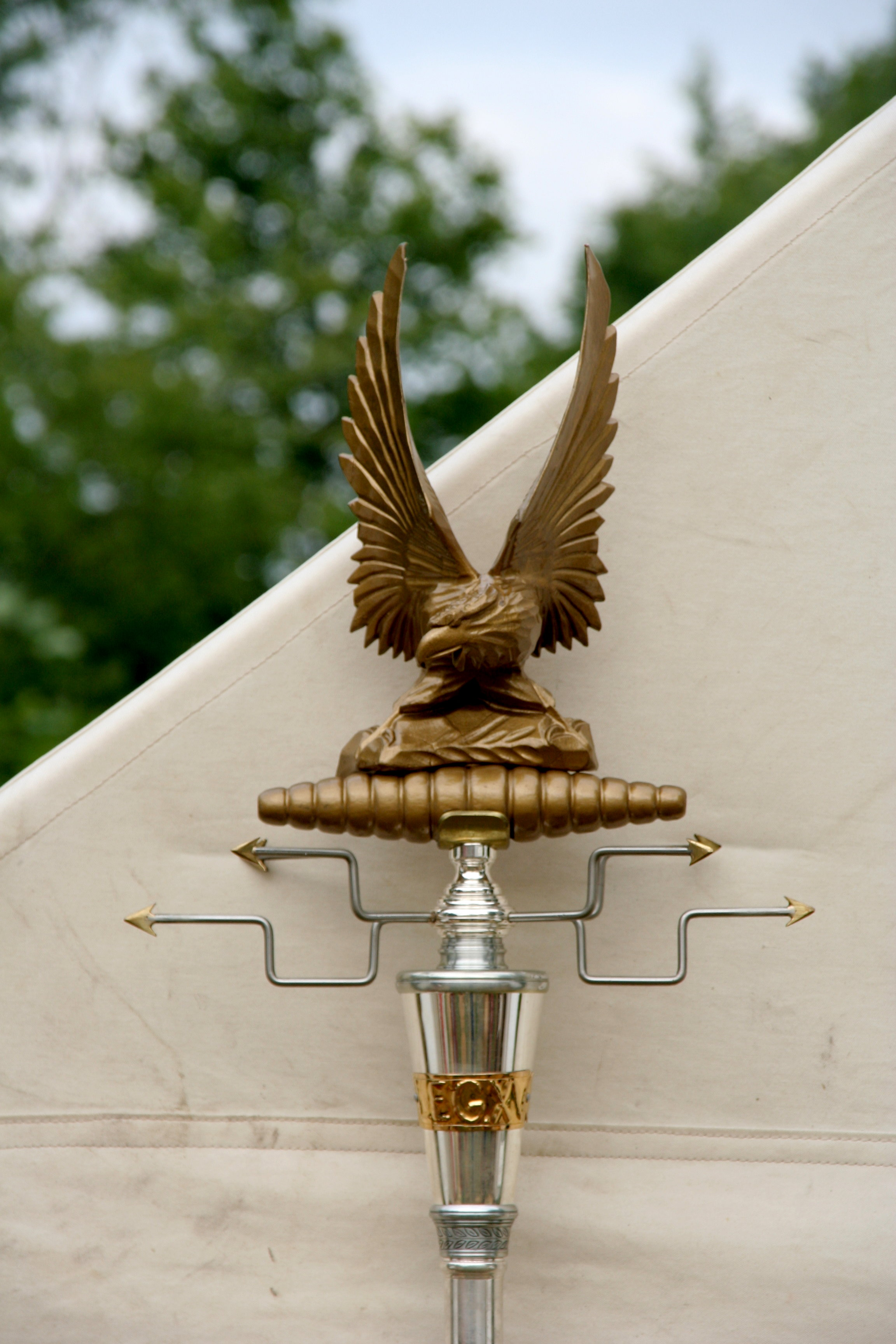
A modern reconstruction of an aquila

An aquila (Classical Latin: [ˈakᶣɪla]; lit. 'eagle') was a prominent symbol used in ancient Rome, especially as the standard of a Roman legion. A legionary known as an aquilifer, the "eagle-bearer", carried this standard. Each legion carried one eagle. It represents the Eagle of Jove (Aëtos), being Jove the "Father of the Roman state".

The eagle had quasi-religious importance to the Roman soldier, far beyond being merely a symbol of his legion. To lose a standard was seen as extremely grave, shameful and dishonorable, and the Roman military went to great lengths both to protect a standard and to recover one if it were to be lost. For example, after the annihilation of three legions in the Teutoburg Forest, the Romans spent decades retaliating for the defeat while also attempting to recover the three lost eagles.

No legionary eagle standards are known to have survived. However, other Roman eagles, either symbolizing imperial rule or used as funerary emblems, have been discovered.

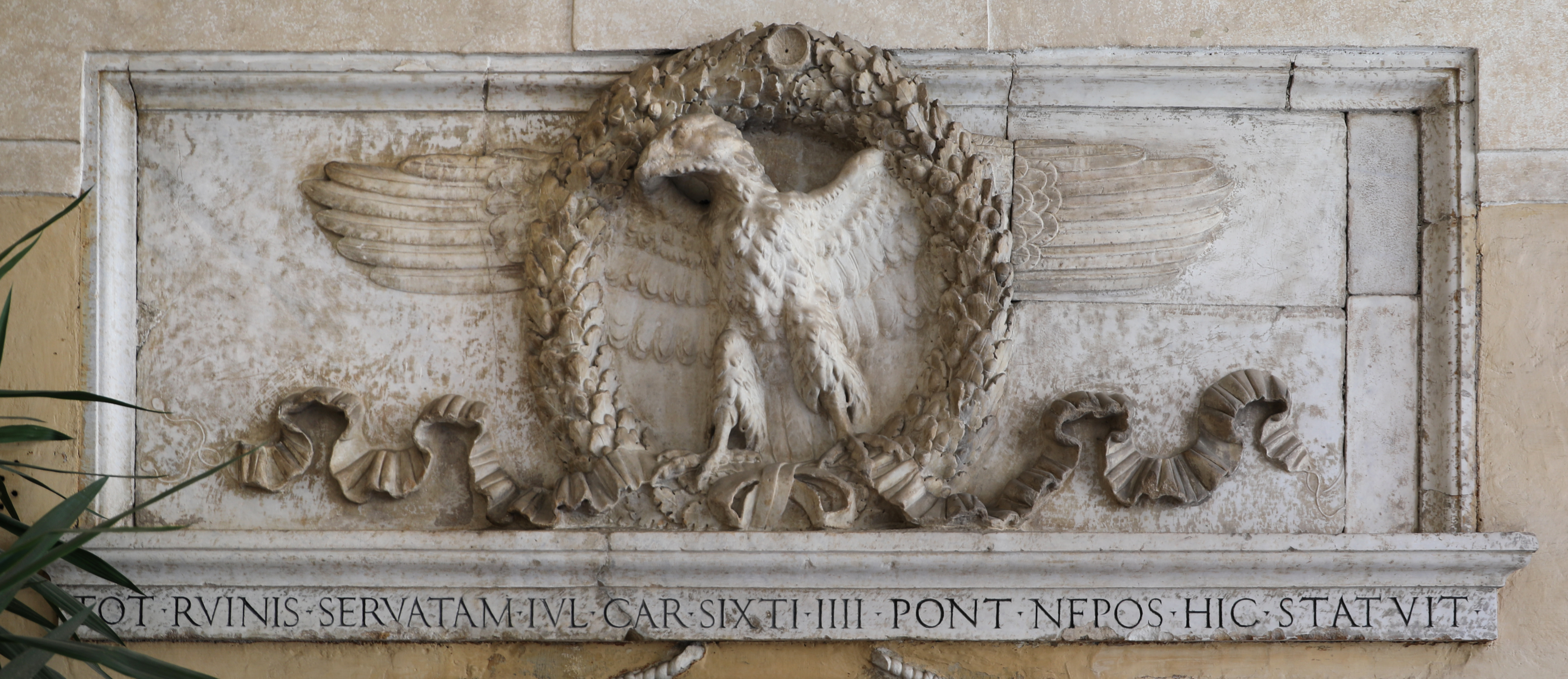
Roman imperial eagle from the 2nd century AD, possibly from Trajan's Forum, in the outer portico of the Basilica of the Holy Apostles in Rome

== History ==
The signa militaria were the Roman military ensigns or standards. The most ancient standard employed by the Romans is said to have been a handful (manipulus) of straw fixed to the top of a spear or pole. Hence the company of soldiers belonging to it was called a maniple. The bundle of hay or fern was soon succeeded by the figures of animals, of which Pliny the Elder (H.N. x.16) enumerates five: the eagle, the wolf, the ox with the man's head, the horse, and the boar. Pliny attributes to the consul Gaius Marius the setting aside of the four quadrupeds as standards and the retention of the eagle (Aquila) alone after the devastating Roman defeat at the Battle of Arausio against the Cimbri and Teutons in 104 BC. It was made of silver, or bronze, with upwards stretched wings, but was probably of relatively small size, since a standard-bearer (signifer) under Augustus is said in circumstances of danger (the Teutoburgerwald battle) to have wrenched the eagle from its staff and concealed it in the folds of his tunic above his girdle. Pliny's claim is refuted by sources showing late republican and early imperial legions with other animal symbols such as bulls and wolves.

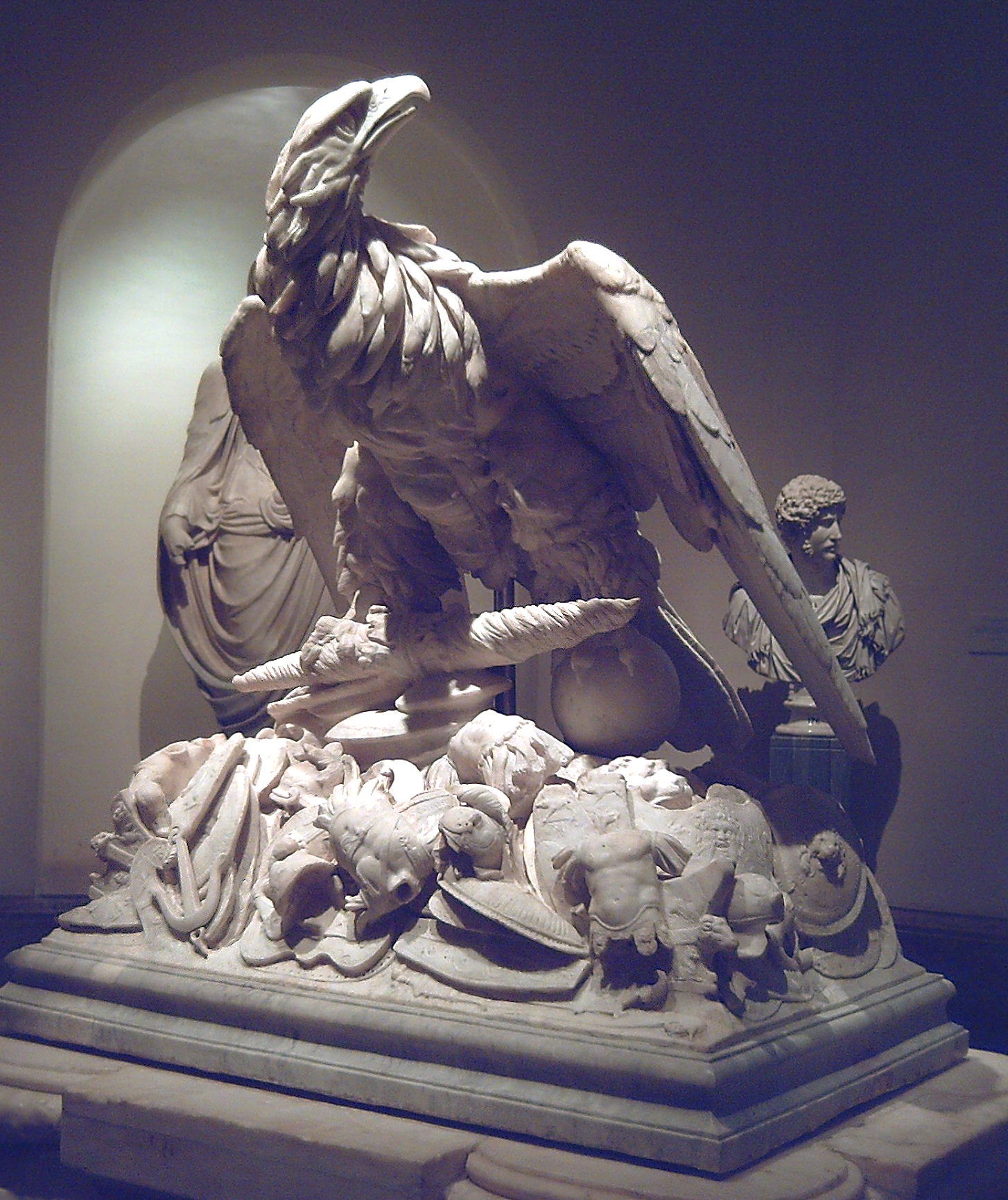
Eagle and weapons from an Augustan-era funerary monument, probably that of Messalla (Prado, Madrid)

Even after the adoption of Christianity as the Roman Empire's religion; the eagle continued to be used as a symbol by the Holy Roman Empire and the early Byzantine Empire although far more rarely and with a different meaning. In particular the double-headed eagle, despite strongly linking back to a Pagan symbol, became very popular among Christians.

== Lost aquilae ==
- Battles where the aquilae were lost, units that lost the aquilae and the fate of the aquilae:
  - 73–71 BC – five aquilae were lost over the course of the Third Servile War, recovered upon the defeat of Spartacus in 71 BC.
  - 53 BC – the defeat of Marcus Licinius Crassus at the Battle of Carrhae by the Parthians. Several legions (returned in 20 BC).
  - 49–45 BC – loss of aquilae from legions of Aulus Gabinius and Publius Vatinius to the Dalmatians during Caesar's Civil War. (returned in 23 BC).
  - 45 BC – loss of aquilae in Spain during Caesar's Civil War. (returned in about 25 BC during the Cantabrian Wars).
  - 40 BC – defeat of Decidius Saxa by a combined Roman–Parthian force under Quintus Labienus near Antioch. Several legions (at least one aquila was returned in 20 BC).
  - 36 BC – the defeat of Oppius Statianus by the Parthians during Antony's Parthian War. Two legions (returned in 20 BC).
  - (19 BC – degradation of a legion during the Cantabrian Wars by removal of the name "Augustan legion". The actual reason is unknown)
  - 17 BC – defeat of Marcus Lollius by Germanic tribes in Gallia in the Clades Lolliana. Legio V Macedonica (returned in 16 BC)
  - 9 – Battle of the Teutoburg Forest in Germania. Legio XVII, Legio XVIII, and Legio XIX (two recaptured by Germanicus in 15 and 16, the last recaptured by Publius Gabinius Secundus in 41).
  - 66 – First Jewish–Roman War. Legio XII Fulminata (fate uncertain).
  - 70 – destruction of Legio XV Primigenia during the Revolt of the Batavi near Xanten. (fate unknown)
  - 86 – defeat of Cornelius Fuscus in the First Battle of Tapae during Domitian's Dacian War. Legio V Alaudae or Praetorian Guard (recaptured during Trajan's Dacian Wars in 101 or 102).
  - (132 – disputed loss of Legio XXII Deiotariana or Legio IX Hispana in the Bar Kochva Revolt)
  - 161 – defeat of Marcus Sedatius Severianus by the Parthians at Elegeia in Armenia. Possibly the Legio IX Hispana or Legio XXII Deiotariana.

== Present ==
In 1804, Napoleon Bonaparte would revive the eagle as a symbol of his house and emblem of the Grande Armée.

The House of Bernadotte also has the eagle as its emblem.

The Great Seal of the United States and several federal agencies (CIA, NSA, Department of Defense etc.) also depict the Eagle of Jove but as a bald eagle.

== Ancient imagery ==
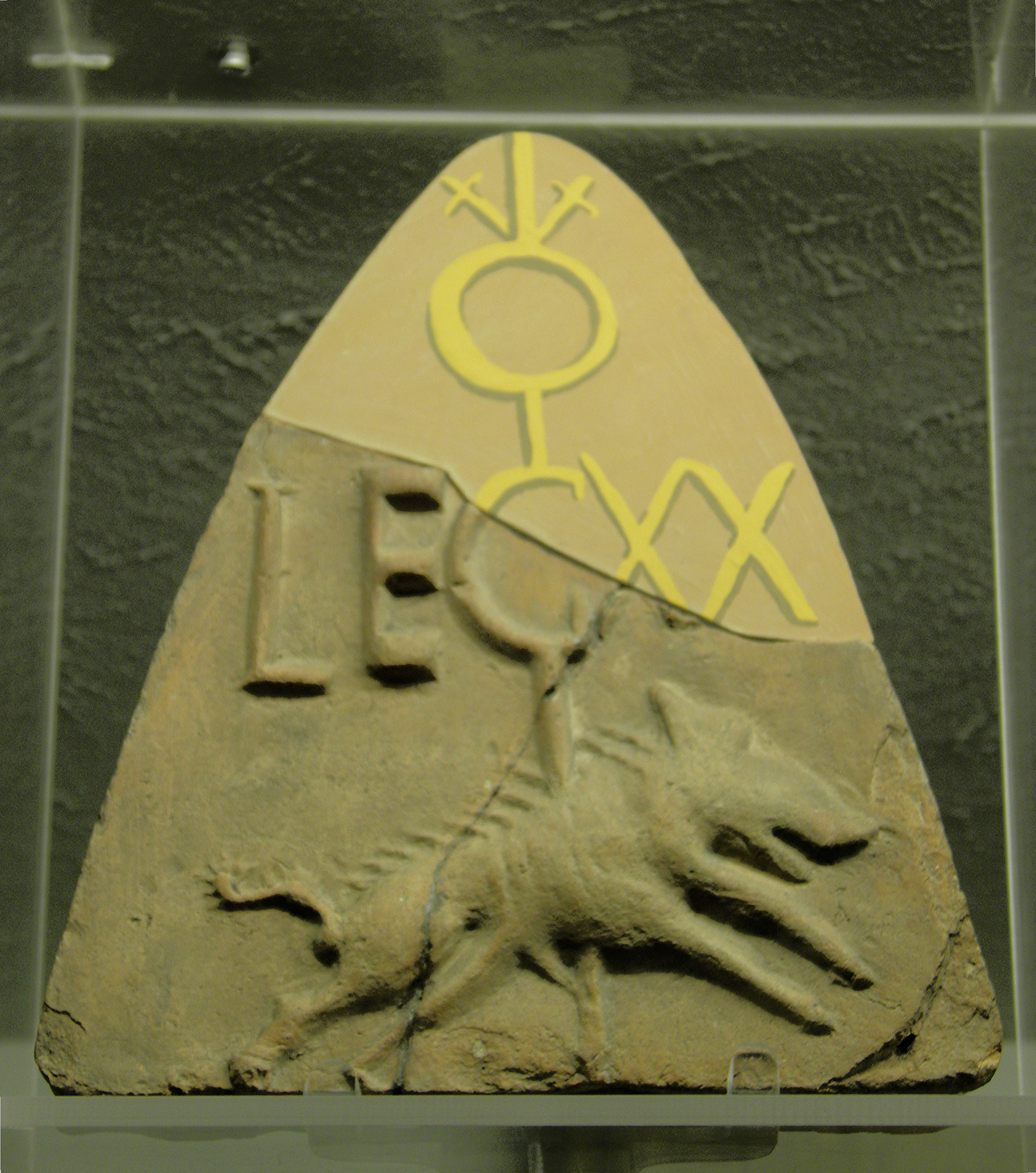
Emblem of the 20th Legion on a roof tile

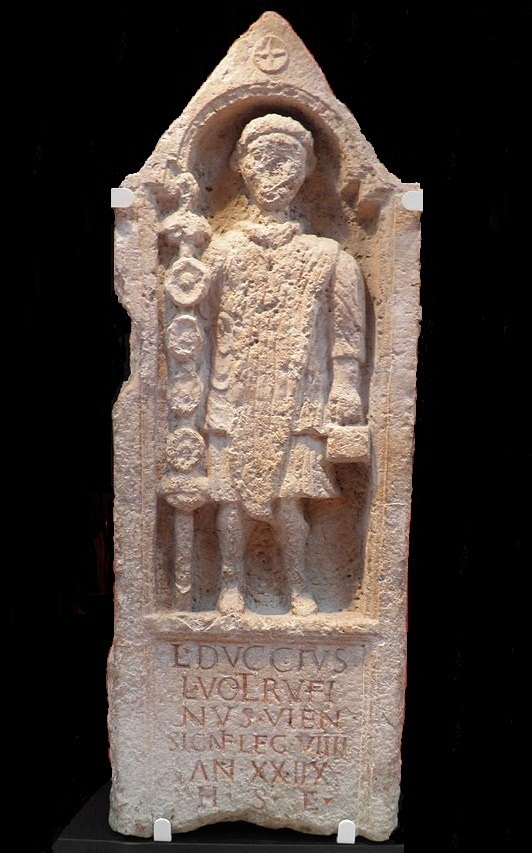
Memorial to Lucius Duccius Rufinus, a standard-bearer of the Ninth Legion, Yorkshire Museum, York

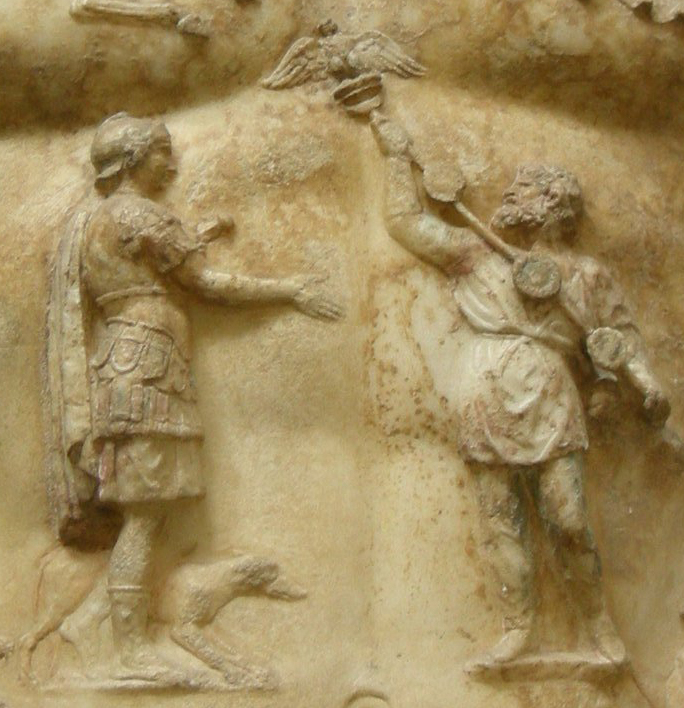
Detail of the central breastplate relief on the statue of Augustus of Prima Porta shows the return of the Aquilae lost to the Parthians. The return of the eagles was one of Augustus's notable diplomatic achievements.

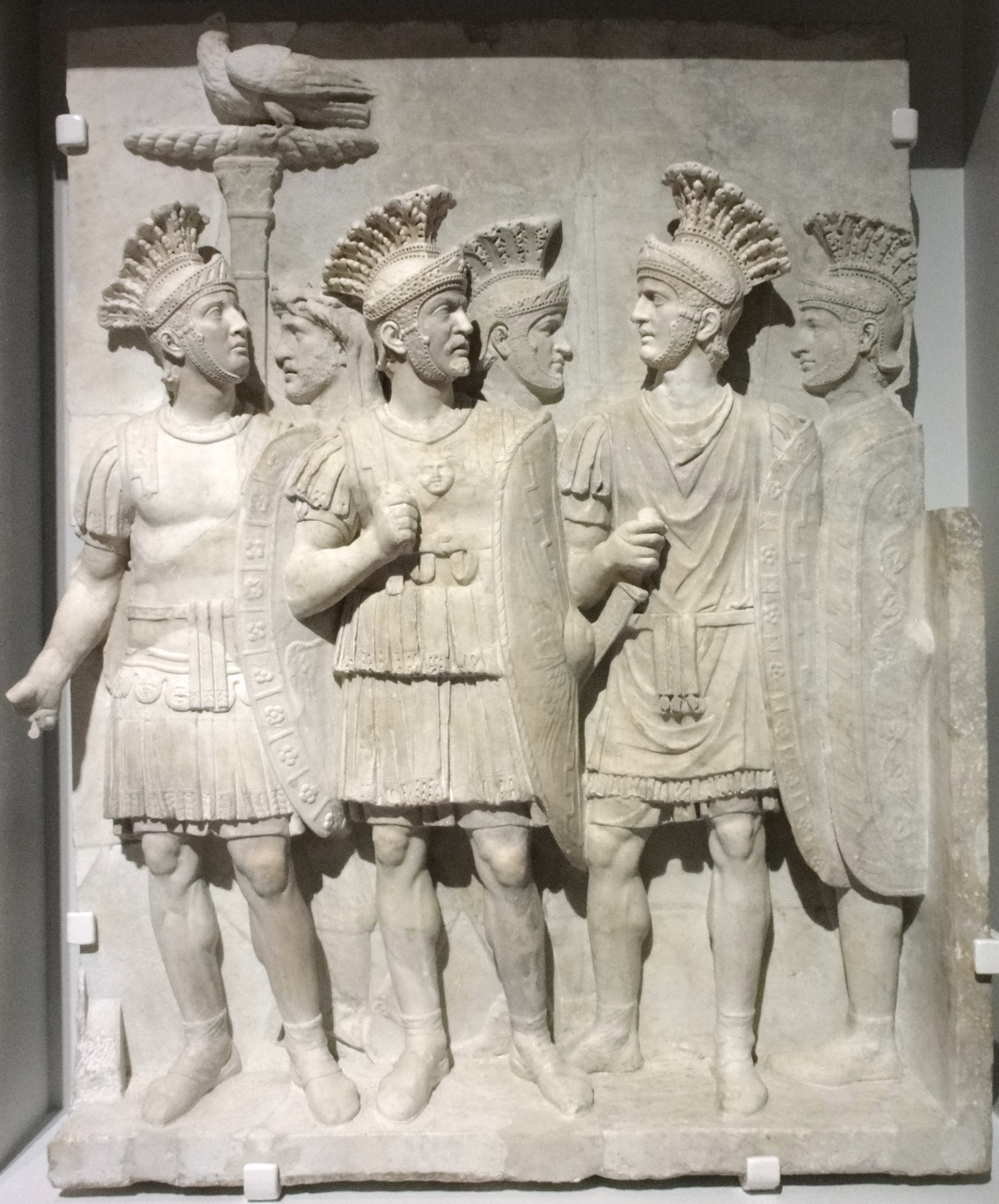
The Praetorians Relief showing an aquila from the destroyed Arch of Claudius in Rome.

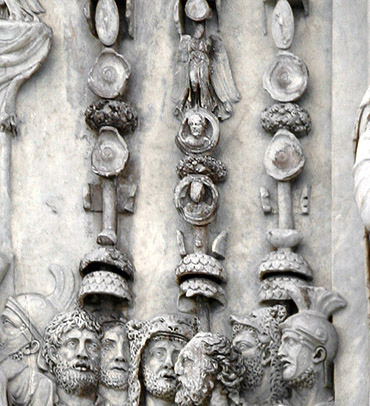
Detail from the Arch of Constantine in Rome

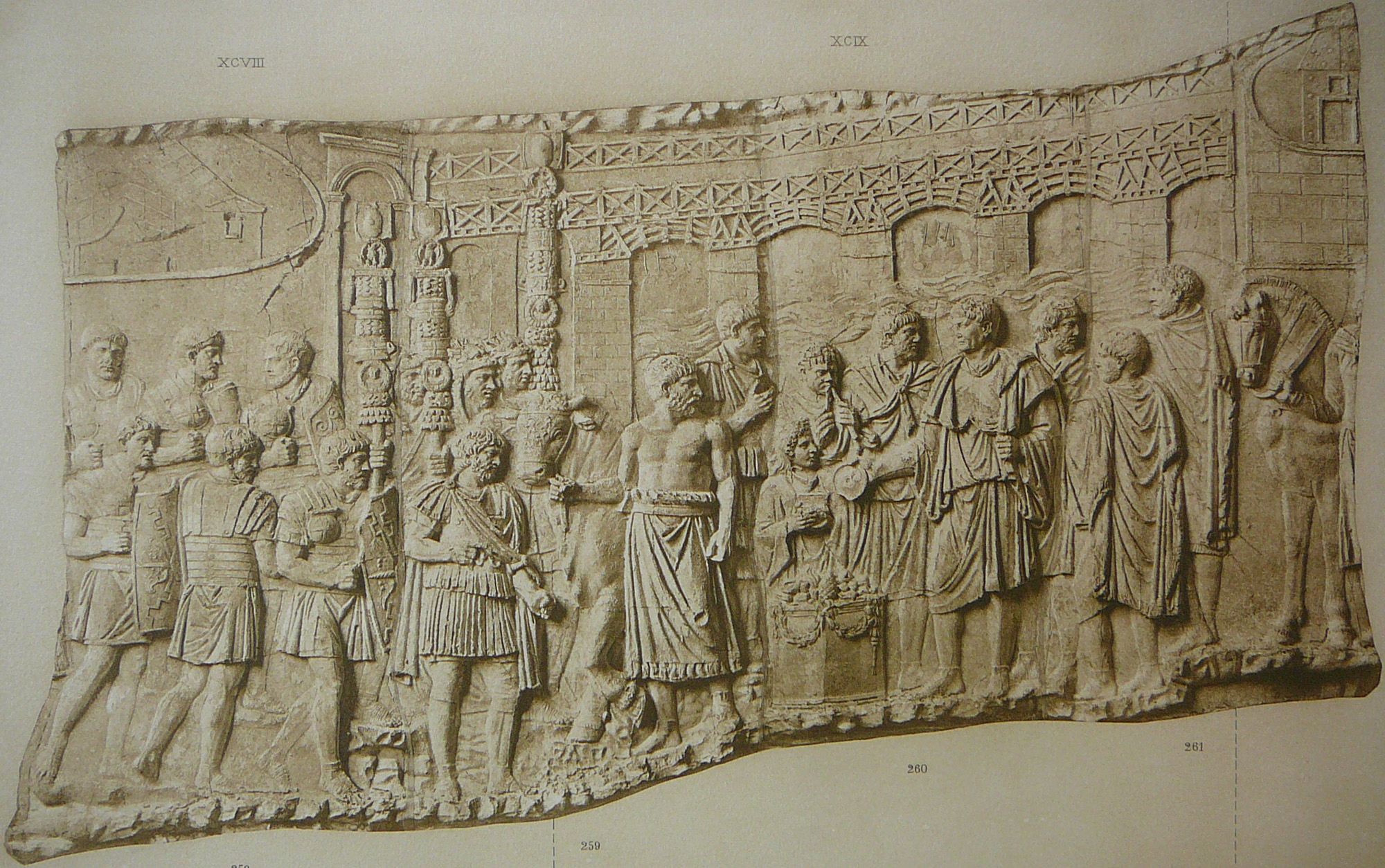
"The Reliefs of Trajan's Column by Conrad Cichorius. Plate number LXXII: Arrival of Roman troops (Scene XCVIII); The emperor sacrifices by the Danube (Scene XCIX); Trajan receives foreign embassies" (aquila at the upper left)

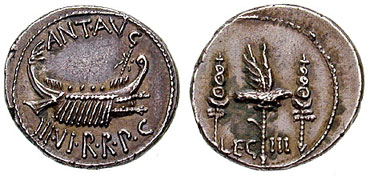
Denarius minted by Mark Antony to pay his legions. On the reverse, the aquila of his Third Legion.

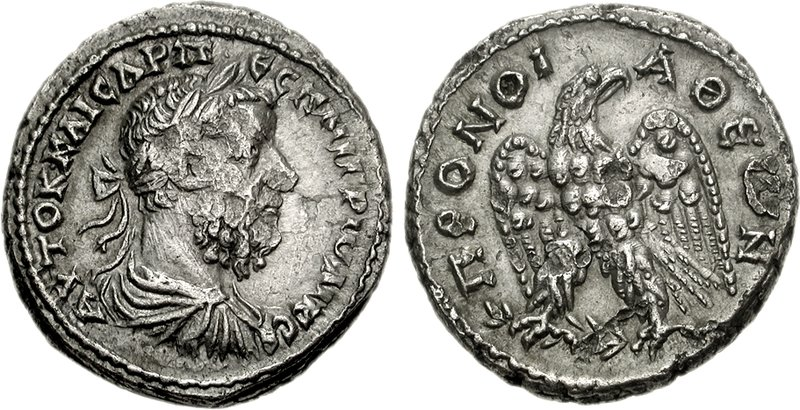
Tetradrachm minted in 193 by Pescennius Niger with an aquila on the reverse

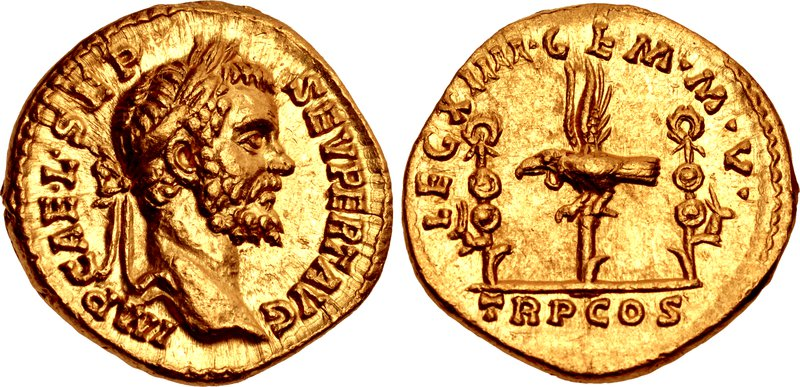
Aureus minted in 193 by Septimius Severus, to celebrate XIIII Gemina Martia Victrix, the legion that proclaimed him emperor

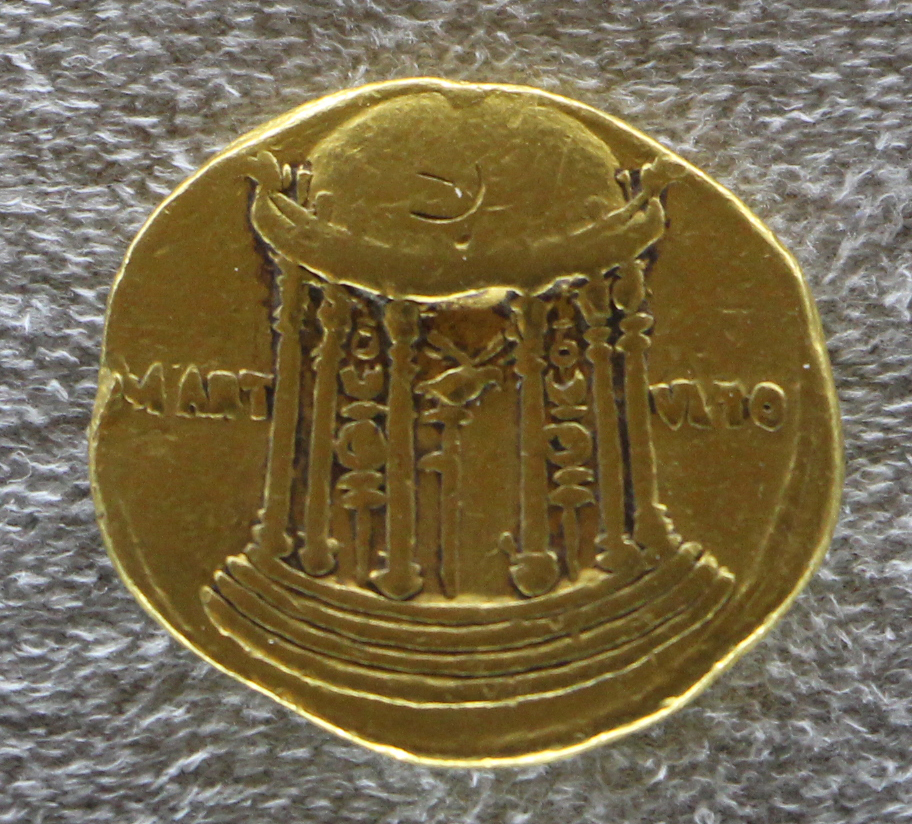
Roman Coin showing the aquila in the Temple of Mars the Avenger in Rome

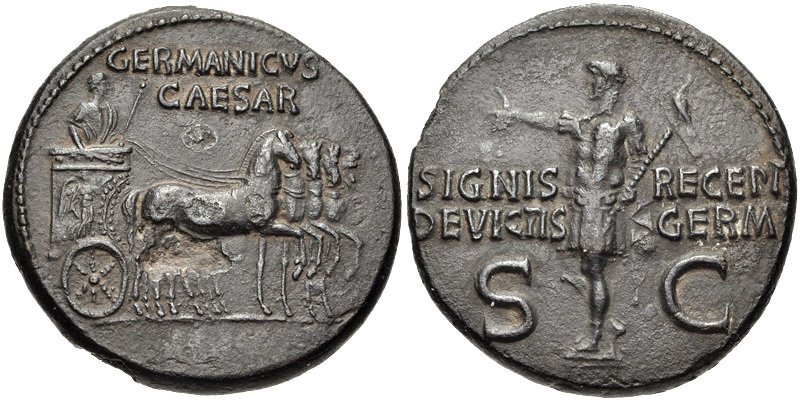
Coin showing Germanicus holding an aquila

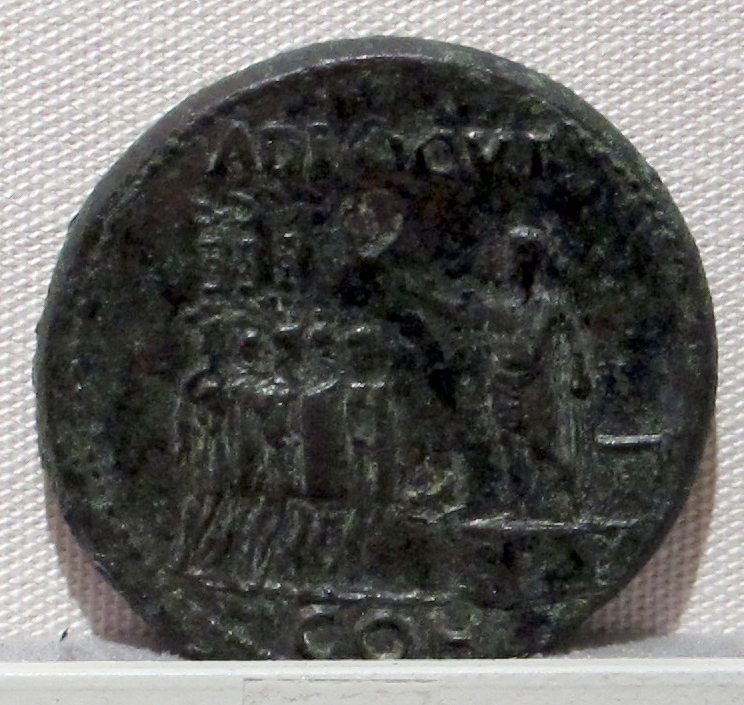
Coin of Emperor Caligula showing several aquilae at the left.

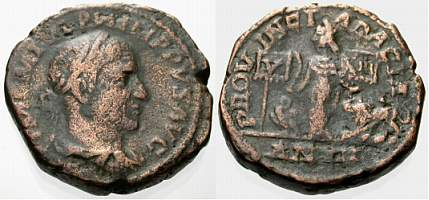
Sestertius minted in 248 by Philip the Arab to celebrate the province of Dacia and its legions, V Macedonica and XIII Gemina. Note the eagle and lion, symbols on the reverse, respectively of Legio V and Legio XIII.

== See also ==
- Reichsadler, the symbol of the Holy Roman Empire
- Silchester eagle
- French Imperial Eagle, a revival of Roman practice in the Napoleonic army
