= Nicholas Size =

British writer and hotelier

- Born: 1866; Liverpool, England
- Died: 14 April 1953 (aged 86–87); Whitehaven, Cumberland, England
- Occupations: Writer, hotelier and railway administrator
- Writing career
- Genres: Fiction, history
- Notable work: The Secret Valley

John Nicholas Size (autumn 1866 – 14 April 1953) was a British hotelier and tourism promoter, and also known for his novels about Norse settlers in the English Lake District.

== Background ==
Size was born in Liverpool, Lancashire in the last quarter of 1866. For many years he was goods manager at Exchange Station in Bradford, Yorkshire. Around 1920, he reopened the abandoned Victoria Hotel, now trading as The Bridge Hotel in Buttermere, Cumberland. Initially he pursued his plan of investing in the hotel in tandem with his railway career, but about 1927 he moved in.

== Books ==
Interested in the heritage of the area, Nicholas joined the Cumberland and Westmorland Antiquarian and Archaeological Society in 1927. Intrigued by the possible connection between Buttermere and the Norse landowner Bueth, mentioned in official documents relating to Cumberland at the time of the Norman conquest in the early 12th century, he produced a booklet, The Epic of Buttermere portraying the secluded valley as a stronghold of resistance to the invaders, and site of a supposed Battle of Rannerdale Knotts. This was so successful that in 1929 he wrote an expanded and illustrated novella version, The Secret Valley. This too was a great success, and in 1930 Frederick Warne, publisher of the Beatrix Potter books produced a new edition.

Encouraged by Sir Hugh Walpole, whose own Lakeland historical novels were very popular at the time, in 1932 Size wrote another local Norse story, the supposed origin of the elegant cross at Gosforth. This had first appeared in the novella The Story of Shelagh, Olaf Cuaran's Daughter, by local historian C.A. Parker, but Size's book Shelagh of Eskdale expanded on what Parker had written, to produce a short novel uniform with the second edition of Secret Valley, again published by Warne. Finally, about a year later, Warne published Ola the Russian, a longer novel in which the setting was broadened to include the whole Norse world, fictionalising the life of Olaf Trygvesson.

Size also wrote a short booklet, The Haunted Moor, which recounted the legendary stories of the various strange features on Ilkley Moor near Bradford. This was only available in the local area (but it contained an advertisement for the Victoria Hotel).

== Burial ==
Nicholas was buried in a blasted-out hole in stone. His two Lakeland novels, reprinted numerous times by Warnes, continued to be available for years after his death. In 1977 they were reissued together by local bookseller and publisher Michael Moon. That edition sold out, and in 1996 a paperback edition of The Secret Valley was published that also sold out. The Victoria Hotel (rechristened the Bridge Hotel) remains in business in 2019.

== Sources ==
- Sheila Richardson, Tales of a Lakeland Valley: Buttermere, Workington, Mill Field Publishing (1995) ISBN 0-9526665-0-2
- Obituary in the Cumberland News (18 Apr 1953)

== Works ==
- Cup and Ring Stones. Shipley Times & Express, 25 April 1924
- The Epic of Buttermere. Historical picture of the great events in Lakeland during Norman times. Buttermere, Size (1927). First published, National Review, June 1927
- The Secret Valley. A picture of the great events which took place in unconquered Lakeland during Norman times. Kendal, Titus Wilson, 1929
- The Secret Valley: the Real Romance of Unconquered Lakeland. London, Warne (1930)
- The Wareham Witches. London, Warne (1931)
- Shelagh of Eskdale, or The Stone of Shame. London, Warne (1932)
- Ola the Russian. London, Warne (circa 1933)
- The Haunted Moor. Otley, William Walker (1934)
- Click Mill at Buttermere. Published in Transactions of the Cumberland and Westmorland Antiquarian and Archaeological Society, second series vol. 36 (1936) doi:10.5284/1063074
