= Arches of Claudius =

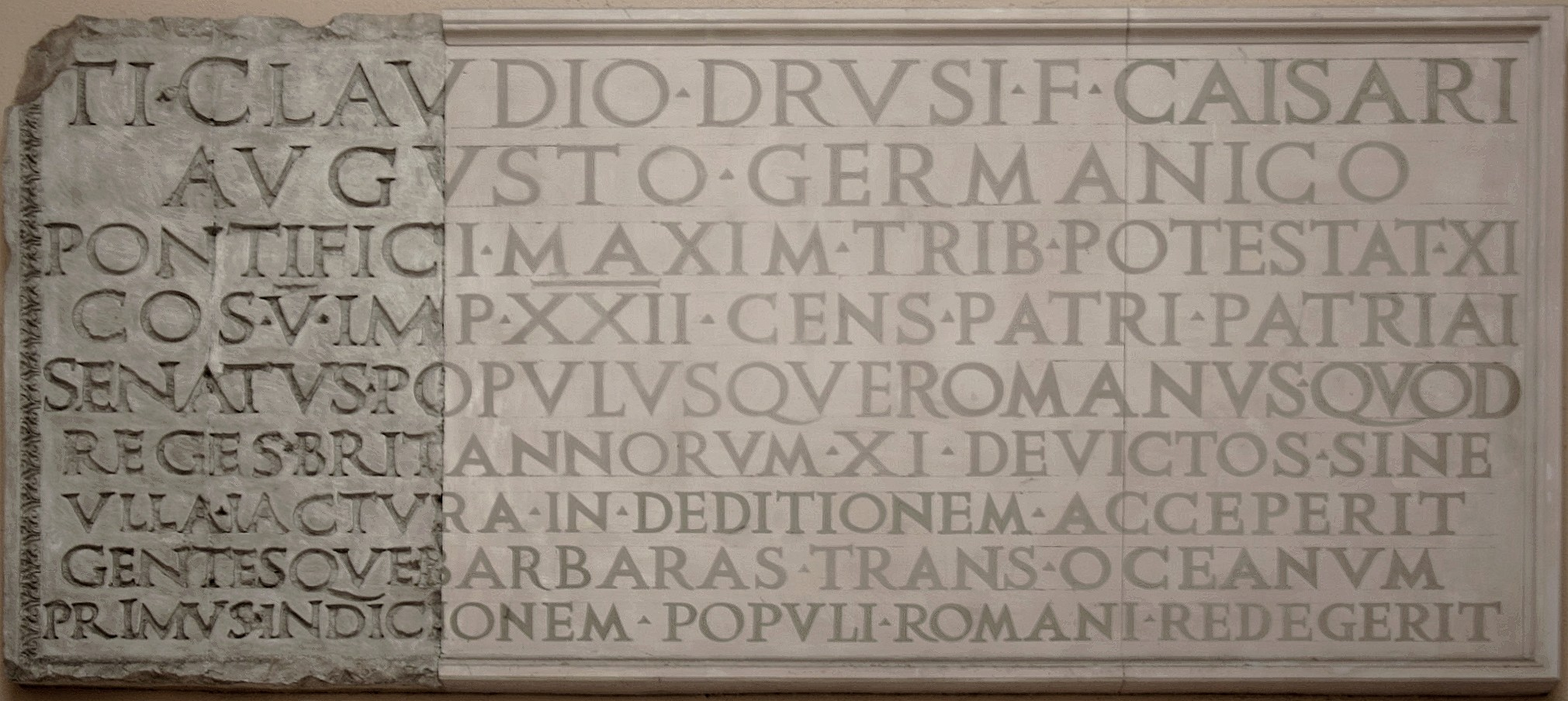
Latin ruler list

A list of arches dedicated to or by the Roman emperor Claudius.

== Rome ==
=== Aqua Virgo ===
One of the arches of the Aqua Virgo, which spanned an ancient street, and was restored in monumental form by Claudius (CIL VI.1252). This arch is still standing, in the court of No. 14 Via del Nazareno (Jord. I.1.472; HJ 457), and is probably referred to by Martial IV.18. as date is 46 A.D.

=== German victories ===
An arch intended to be erected in honour of Claudius' victories in Germany (Dio LX.8 for victories by his generals over the Cauchi and the Chatti in 41 A.D.) is shown in several of his coins of 41 A.D. (and following years) (Cohen, Nero Drusus 1‑6; Claud. 25‑29, 48; BM Imp. Claud. 2, 36, 95‑103, 121‑123, 187‑191). Whether it was actually erected, and if so, where, is uncertain (BM Imp. p. clii).

== Empire ==
- Rutupiae
- Boulogne-sur-Mer
- Cyzicus

== See also ==
- List of Roman triumphal arches
- List of ancient monuments in Rome

This article contains text from Platner and Ashby's A Topographical Dictionary of Ancient Rome, a text now in the public domain.
