= The Eagle of the Ninth =

1954 children's novel by Rosemary Sutcliff

- First edition
- Author: Rosemary Sutcliff
- Illustrator: C. Walter Hodges
- Language: English
- Genre: Historical novel
- Publisher: Oxford University Press
- Publication date: 1954
- Publication place: United Kingdom
- Media type: Print (hardback)
- Pages: 255
- Followed by: The Silver Branch

The Eagle of the Ninth is a historical adventure novel for children written by Rosemary Sutcliff and published in 1954. The story is set in Roman Britain in the 2nd century AD, after the building of Wall of Hadrian and follows a young centurion who lost his father when the Ninth Legion disappeared north of the wall. Sutcliff was inspired by a bronze eagle uncovered at Silchester and displayed in Reading Museum.

== Plot ==
Discharged because of a battle wound that has left him lame in one leg, young Roman officer Marcus Flavius Aquila tries to discover the truth about the disappearance of his father's legion in northern Britain. Disguised as a Greek oculist and travelling beyond Hadrian's Wall with his freed ex-slave, the British native hunter Esca, Marcus finds that a demoralized and mutinous Ninth Legion was annihilated by a great rising of the northern tribes. In part, this disgrace was redeemed through a heroic last stand by a small remnant (including Marcus' father) around the legion's eagle standard. Marcus' hope of seeing the lost legion re-established is dashed, but he is able to bring back the gilded bronze eagle so that it can no longer serve as a symbol of Roman defeat – and thus will no longer be a danger to the frontier's security. Rewarded by Rome for his services, he decides to settle as a landowner and farmer in Britain with his British wife, Cottia, and his freed friend, Esca.

== Development ==
The Eagle of the Ninth is one of Sutcliff's earlier books, but may be her best-known title. It is the first in a sequence of novels, followed by The Silver Branch, Frontier Wolf, The Lantern Bearers (which won a Carnegie Medal), Sword at Sunset, Dawn Wind, Sword Song, and The Shield Ring. The sequence loosely traces a family, of the Roman Empire and then of Britain, who inherit an emerald seal ring bearing the insignia of a dolphin. The book has also been published as The Eagle. It has been adapted a few times, most notably as the 2011 film The Eagle.

=== Historical basis ===
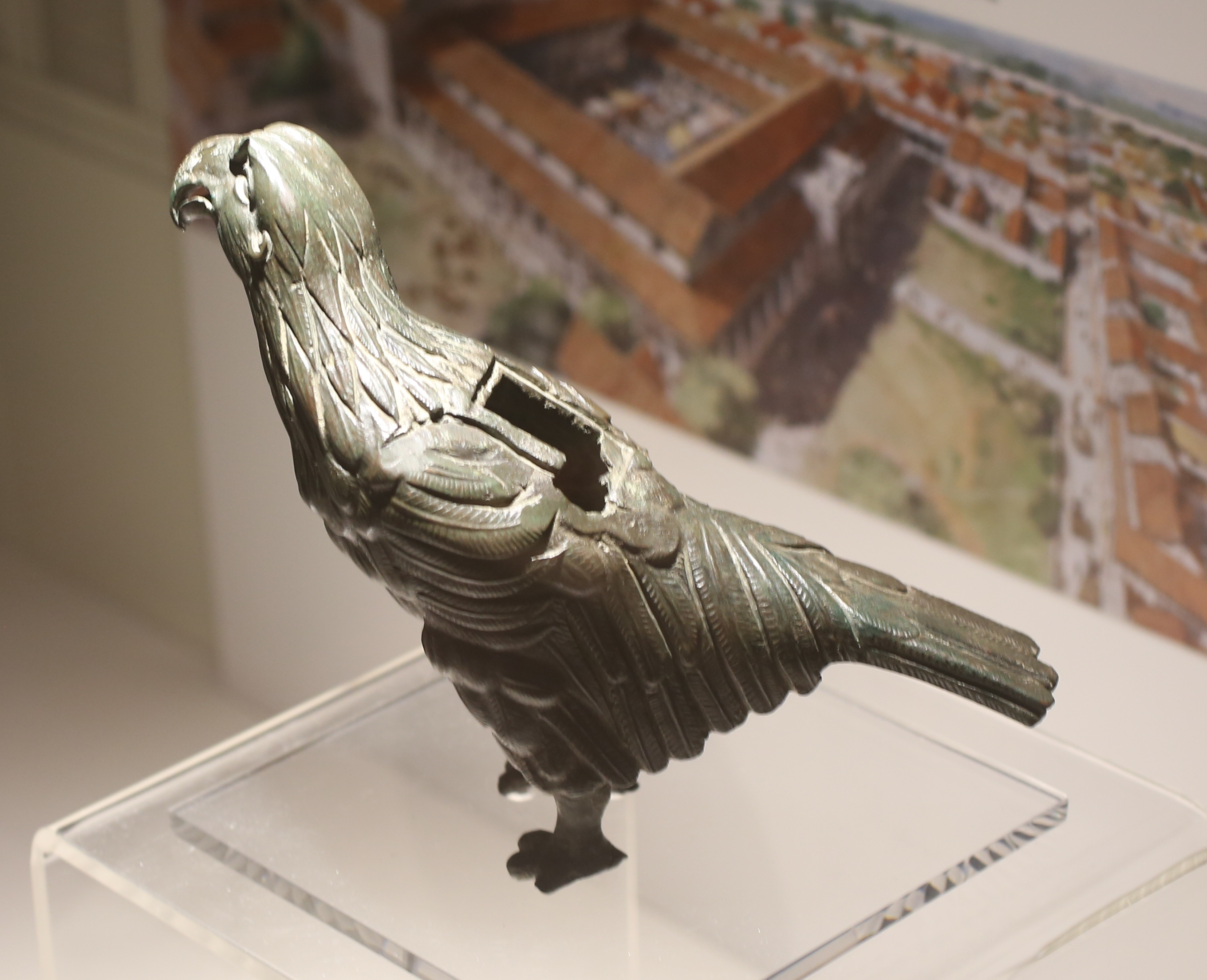
The Silchester eagle

Sutcliff wrote in a foreword that she created the story from two elements: the disappearance of the Legio IX Hispana (Ninth Legion) from the historical record following an expedition north to deal with Caledonian tribes in 117; and the discovery of a wingless Roman eagle in excavations at Calleva Atrebatum (Silchester). The Museum of Reading, which now houses the Silchester eagle, states that it "is not a legionary eagle but has been immortalized as such by Rosemary Sutcliff". It may originally have formed part of a Jupiter statue in the forum of the Roman town. Sutcliff also assumed that the legion's title of "Hispana" meant that it was raised in Hispania (now Spain and Portugal), but it was probably awarded this title for victories there.

At the time Sutcliff wrote, it was a plausible theory that the unit had been wiped out in Britain during a period of unrest early in the reign of the Emperor Hadrian (AD 117–138). Scholarly opinion now disputes this, for there are extant records that have been interpreted as indicating that detachments of the Ninth Legion were serving on the Rhine frontier later than the year 117, and it has been suggested that it was probably annihilated in the east of the Roman Empire. This in turn is disputed by other historians, who assert that it was indeed destroyed in northern Britain. Sheppard Frere, a Romano-British historian, has concluded that "further evidence is needed before more can be said".

== In other media ==
=== Radio ===
- The BBC Home Service produced a radio dramatisation which was first broadcast in six parts in Children's Hour between 27 February and 3 April 1957, repeated between 7 September and 12 October 1958, and later re-edited into a 90-minute radio play version broadcast in June 1963. The adaptation was by Felix Felton who also played the part of Guern the hunter; Marius Goring played Marcus and Martin Starkie Esca. An extract from the fourth movement of Ottorino Respighi's symphonic poem The Pines of Rome was used as the theme music.
- It was adapted again by the BBC in a full-cast radio drama in 1996 starring Tom Smith.

=== Television ===
- A BBC television series was made of the book in 1977, scripted by Bill Craig, Donald Bull and Arden Winch, and with Anthony Higgins as Marcus Aquila.

=== Film ===
- A film adaptation titled The Eagle was released in 2011, directed by Kevin Macdonald and with Channing Tatum as Marcus Aquila and Jamie Bell as Esca.
