= The Silver Branch (Sutcliff novel) =

1957 children's novel by Rosemary Sutcliff

- First edition
- Author: Rosemary Sutcliff
- Illustrator: Charles Keeping
- Language: English
- Genre: Children's, Historical novel
- Publisher: Oxford University Press
- Publication date: December 1957
- Publication place: United Kingdom
- Media type: Print (Hardback & Paperback)
- Pages: 223
- ISBN: 0-374-46648-3
- OCLC: 27934892
- LC Class: PZ7.S966 Shl 1993
- Preceded by: The Eagle of the Ninth
- Followed by: The Lantern Bearers

The Silver Branch is a historical adventure novel for children written by Rosemary Sutcliff and published in 1957, with illustrations by Charles Keeping. Set in Britain in the last decade of the 3rd century, it is the story of Justin and Flavius, two cousins in the Roman legions who find themselves in the intrigue and battle surrounding the struggles between Carausius, a self-proclaimed emperor in Britain, Allectus, Carausius's treasurer, and Constantius, emperor in Rome.

The silver branch of the title is an article in the possession of Carausius's slave Cullen, his eccentric fool who calls himself Carausius's hound and who wears a dog's tail as part of his motley. Subtle allusions to the silver branch recur in other novels in the Eagle of the Ninth series, and it presumably refers to the otherworldly musical instrument mentioned in the medieval Irish narrative The Voyage of Bran. The Silver Branch was also a symbol of authority and a temporary "pass card" used by the Celts, consisting of a sprig of mistletoe or an apple branch.

The Silver Branch is second in Sutcliff's Roman Britain Series, following The Eagle of the Ninth (1954) and preceding Frontier Wolf (1980), The Lantern Bearers (1959), and Sword at Sunset (1963).

== Summary ==
The story is set in 3rd-century Roman Britain, when Marcus Aurelius Carausius (Curoi), the military commander, has rebelled against Rome and named himself the emperor of Britain and northern Gaul. After a series of naval victories, he is temporarily recognized by Rome's ruler Maximian.

Justin (Tiberius Lucius Justinianus), a shy young army surgeon who had just completed his apprenticeship in Beersheba, is posted to Britain for the first time, although his family has been connected with the island for years. On arriving at Rutupiae, he meets a young centurion called Flavius (Marcelus Flavius Aquila), who turns out to be a distant cousin, and they become fast friends. Upon overhearing a plot against Carausius by his finance minister Allectus, they try to warn the emperor but, due to their perceived disloyalty, are instead reposted to Magnis on the Northern Wall in seeming disgrace, but confusingly combined with a moderate promotion. There, Justin and Flavius meet an exiled Dalriad hunter, Evicatos of the Spear, who tells them that Allectus promised to help the Picts against the Dalriads if they would help him overthrow Carausius. To save his own people from that danger, Evicatos urges the two Romans to write a warning letter to Carausius. On hearing that the letter was intercepted by Allectus's men, the two cousins know that they are in mortal danger, go into hiding and race south to warn Carausius. On their way they get the news that Allectus's Saxon allies already killed Carausius and that Allectus is the new emperor.

They now plan to go to Gaul, where the junior western emperor, Constantius, is gathering forces to overthrow Allectus. While vainly looking for a transport, they are found by Paulinus, the leader of a resistance group, who urges them to stay in Britain and help him with his work. When Paulinus is betrayed, the two young men must take over the banner of rebellion and continue his work of protecting and smuggling away people who are disenchanted with Allectus.

Finally, Constantius and his aide, the Praetorian prefect Asclepiodotus, sail to Britain to put an end to Allectus's misrule. Flavius and Justin assemble a ragtag group of people prepared to fight on their behalf. When they are hiding at their great-aunt Honoria's place in Calleva, they discover the lost eagle standard that was buried by their ancestor, Aquila, around which their small group rallies. Despite their looks, the new 'legion' helps the main Roman force find their way and defends the helpless inhabitants of Calleva from the fighting. In recognition of their help, the cousins are honoured by Constantius.

The motifs of the lost eagle standard and dolphin signet ring reoccur in this book.

== Background ==
The book is based around the 3rd century events of the Carausian Revolt, the subsequent life and death of Carausius and the defeat of the traitor Allectus.
