= The Lantern Bearers (Sutcliff novel) =

1959 novel by Rosemary Sutcliff

- First edition
- Author: Rosemary Sutcliff
- Illustrator: Charles Keeping
- Language: English
- Series: Roman Britain; Marcus
- Genre: Historical novel, children's adventure novel
- Publisher: Oxford University Press
- Publication date: December 1959
- Publication place: United Kingdom
- Media type: Print (hardback and paperback)
- Pages: 252 pp (first edition)
- OCLC: 9405024
- LC Class: PZ7.S966 Lan
- Preceded by: The Silver Branch
- Followed by: Sword at Sunset

The Lantern Bearers is a historical novel for children by Rosemary Sutcliff, first published by Oxford in 1959 with illustrations by Charles Keeping. Set in Roman Britain during the 5th century, it is the story of a British Roman's life after the final withdrawal of Roman troops (around 410). Sutcliff won the annual Carnegie Medal from the Library Association, recognising the year's best children's book by a British subject.

Lantern Bearers is the third of four books sometimes catalogued as the Marcus series (1954 to 1963), inaugurated by The Eagle of the Ninth. At the same time it is the fourth of eight books sometimes called the Eagle of the Ninth series (1954 to 1997). Its themes are more complex than in the first two Marcus books. Issues of loss, estrangement, and loyalty are more complicated, pulling main characters in conflicting directions. Reviewers tend to regard it as appropriate for a slightly older readership than its predecessors. On the other hand, it is "officially a children's book" while its sequel Sword at Sunset is "officially an adult book". According to Sutcliff, "my books are for children of all ages, from nine to ninety." Within the loosely connected Eagle of the Ninth series, The Lantern Bearers is first of the specifically "Arthurian" works. In the sequel, beginning three days later, the viewpoint shifts from Aquila to Arthur.

== Title ==
The title is from a remark by one of the characters, Eugenus the Physician, "We are the lantern bearers, my friend; for us to keep something burning, to carry what light we can forward into the darkness and the wind." The effort to maintain what the protagonists see as the light of civilisation against Saxon barbarians is central to the plot of the book.

== Summary ==
The story is set during the turbulent years following the withdrawal of the Romans from Britain. The land is reeling under the onslaught of Saxon raiders, the Pict War and a slave revolt. Vortigern, the British-Celtic chieftain, has invited Hengest the Saxon and his tribe to fight the Picts, and relies on Roman soldiers to hold the Saxons in check. Rome is increasingly under threat from the barbarian hordes surrounding it on all sides and cannot afford to deal with the problems of a distant province.

18-year-old Aquila, descendant of Marcus Flavius Aquila, is a decurion of Roman cavalry, serving in the Auxiliary legion at Rutupiae. The story begins when Aquila is home on leave at the family farm in the Downs, with his blind father Flavian, younger sister Flavia and trusted servants who have served his family for years. The few remaining Romans, including Aquila's father Flavian, look upon Ambrosius Aurelianus, the descendant of a Welsh princess and a Roman soldier, as the last hope of Britain. Aquila is hastily recalled to Rutupiae where he is informed that all Roman troops will be withdrawing from Britain in three days on orders from Rome. Caught by surprise, Aquila struggles between loyalty to his duty and attachment with his homeland. At the last minute, he decides that he belongs to Britain and not Rome and so deserts the army. As the last of the legions sail away, he lights the beacon at Rutupiae for the last time.

He returns home, only to have the farm attacked by a raiding party of Saxons two days later. In the skirmish, Aquila kills the leader of the band but is soon overpowered by the many assailants. He is forced to watch while a blond giant carries away Flavia forcibly. The raiders kill everyone else on the farm and burn down everything. Aquila is left tied to a tree for the wolves as revenge for killing the Saxon.

The Saxons are followed by a band of Jutish raiders, who find Aquila and take him to Jutland. Aquila spends nearly three years as a slave, during which time he learns that the Saxons who murdered his family and destroyed his home were no chance band of raiders but sent there by Hengest as revenge on Flavian and others who had dared to write to Consul Aetius in Rome pleading for help against Vortigern and the Saxons. Flavian had been betrayed by a bird-catcher who used to carry messages between the Roman plotters. Often tormented by visions of his sister screaming for help, Aquila bides his time for the day he can return, find his sister and take revenge on the bird-catcher.

Bad harvests force the Jutes to accept Hengest's invitation to settle in Britain. Aquila sails with them and returns to Britain only to find Rutupiae forsaken and devastated. With the Romans gone and Vortigern too powerless to resist, Hengest has free run of the land. Aquila is plotting his escape from the Saxon camp when he chances upon Flavia, who is now married to the man who abducted her and has a year-old child by him. She helps him escape but refuses to come with him, telling him that she cannot leave her husband and child. Devastated by her apparent betrayal, Aquila leaves alone and bitter.

He stumbles upon a cheerful bee-keeping monk, Brother Ninnias, who lives by himself in a forest, the lone survivor of a Saxon raid upon his abbey. Brother Ninnias cuts away the thrall-ring around Aquila's neck and gives him food and shelter. During his stay with the monk, Aquila learns that the bird-catcher had betrayed his father only after being tortured by the Saxons and had died soon after. Denied his revenge as well as his sister, Aquila realises he no longer has a purpose in life. Brother Ninnias advises him to take up his father Flavian's cause and offer his service to the Prince of Britain, Ambrosius Aurelianius.

Aquila travels to Dynas Ffaraon, Ambrosius's stronghold in the Welsh mountains and is soon accepted into the prince's Inner Companions. But past hurt and bitterness makes him wary of people and he soon begins to be called 'Lone Wolf'. Ambrosius tries to unite the people of Britain – Celts and Romans alike – to fight the Saxons. He tells Aquila to marry one of the two daughters of Cradoc, a Celtic chieftain whose life Ambrosius had once saved during battle, as an alliance to unite the two peoples and Aquila chooses younger spirited Ness over the beautiful elder sister, Rhyanidd. At first Aquila is quite indifferent to Ness and she resents him for taking her away from her home and her people. As years pass by, Aquila learns to let go of his hurt and open up to others, especially after the birth of his son who he names Flavian in his father's memory.

In the years of skirmishes, uneasy truce and battles that follow, Ambrosius finally scores a decisive victory over the Saxons with the help of Artos (Arthur), his nephew, and Aquila. During the fight, Aquila sees a young dark-haired boy resembling his sister. He tries to dismiss it as his imagination but comes upon the boy lying unconscious on the road and realises that it is indeed Flavia's son. With Brother Ninnias' help, he tends to the boy's injuries, hides him from British soldiers and sends him back to his mother with a message for her. Later Aquila publicly confesses his deed to Ambrosius on the night of the banquet celebrating Ambrosius' ascension as the High King of Britain. Ambrosius listens to the whole story and forgives him. Aquila finally feels free and content even though he knows that the respite he and his people have found is only temporary and they cannot hold off the invaders from Britain forever.

== Background ==
The novel is set in Britain at the beginning of the Early Middle Ages when the once-dominant Roman empire was declining and tribes from the east began migrating into West Europe. The author uses this time period for a realistic retelling of the mythical tale of King Arthur. The next book in the series, Sword at Sunset, continues the same story.

Arthur's supposed uncle, Ambrosius Aurelianus is seen as a remnant of the old Roman ways trying to defend his homeland against what seems to be an unstoppable invasion of foreign barbarians. The book presents several other historical-mythical figures such as Hengist and Horsa, the Saxon chiefs who invade England and Vortigern, king of Britons. Brother Ninnias could be a version of the monk Nennius, who is traditionally considered to have authored Historia Brittonum.

Several aspects of the time period are treated sympathetically. The story juxtaposes several opposing points of view such as the resentment of the Romano-Britannic people who are being invaded by what they see as personifications of evil and darkness, and the desperate need of the continental tribes who face poor harvests and starvation in their own lands.

== See also ==
- Sub-Roman Britain
- Anglo-Saxon settlement of Britain

Awards
Preceded by Tom's Midnight Garden	Carnegie Medal recipient 1959	Succeeded by The Making of Man
