= Tectonic weapon =

Hypothetical device to cause seismic events

A tectonic weapon is a hypothetical device or system which could trigger earthquakes, volcanic eruptions, or other seismic events in specified locations by interfering with the Earth's natural geological processes. It was defined in 1992 by Aleksey Vsevolodovich Nikolayev, corresponding member of the Russian Academy of Sciences: "A tectonic or seismic weapon would be the use of the accumulated tectonic energy of the Earth's deeper layers to induce a destructive earthquake". He added "to set oneself the objective of inducing an earthquake is extremely doubtful." Though no such device is known to have been built, tectonic weapons have occasionally appeared as plot devices in works of fiction.

== Concept ==
Theoretically, a tectonic weapon functions by creating a powerful charge of elastic energy in the form of deformed volume of the Earth's crust in a region of tectonic activity. This then becomes an earthquake once triggered by a nuclear explosion in the epicenter or a vast electric pulse.

While a nuclear explosion can trigger an earthquake within a few tens of kilometers, earthquakes induced by explosions have been much smaller than the explosion. A study on possible correlation between large nuclear tests at the Nevada Test Site and earthquakes hundreds of kilometers away in California found no peaks in seismicity at the times of the explosions.

The 1968 one-megaton underground nuclear test Faultless caused clearly visible surface slip up to 40 km away. The United States Geological Survey stated that it produced fresh fault rupture some 1,200 meters long. It has been suggested that a 1998 earthquake in Afghanistan was triggered by thermonuclear tests that had been conducted at test sites in India and Pakistan two to twenty days before; however, the USGS concluded from the data that "there is no evidence of a causal connection between the nuclear testing and the large earthquake in Afghanistan and it is pure coincidence that they occurred near in time and location".

== Reports ==
Roger Clark, lecturer in geophysics at Leeds University said in the journal Nature in 1996, responding to a newspaper report that there had been two secret Soviet programs, "Mercury" and "Volcano", aimed at developing a "tectonic weapon" that could set off earthquakes from great distance by manipulating electromagnetism, "We don't think it is impossible, or wrong, but past experience suggests it is very unlikely". According to Nature these programs had been "unofficially known to Western geophysicists for several years". According to the story the Mercury program began in 1987, three tests were conducted in Kyrgyzstan, and Volcano's last test occurred in 1992.

Such weapons, whether or not they exist or are feasible, are a source of concern in official circles. For example, US Secretary of Defense William S. Cohen said on 28 April 1997 at the Conference on Terrorism, Weapons of Mass Destruction, and U.S. Strategy at the University of Georgia, while discussing the dangers of false threats, "Others are engaging even in an eco-type of terrorism whereby they can alter the climate, set off earthquakes, volcanoes remotely through the use of electromagnetic waves."

New Zealand's unsuccessful Project Seal programme during World War II attempted to create a tsunami bomb, generating tsunami waves as a weapon. It was reported in 1999 that such a weapon might be viable.

Nikola Tesla claimed a small (something "you could put in your overcoat pocket") steam-powered mechanical oscillator he was experimenting with in 1898 produced earthquake-like effects, but this has never been replicated. The television show MythBusters in 2006 Episode 60 – "Earthquake Machine" made a small machine using a specially designed computer-controlled electromagnetic linear actuator instead of steam; it produced vibrations in a large structure detectable hundreds of feet away, but no significant shaking. Their judgement was that the test with their version of the oscillator busted the myth.

== International treaties ==
The 1978 Convention on the Prohibition of Military or Any Other Hostile Use of Environmental Modification Techniques is an international treaty ratified by 75 states, and signed by a further 17, that prohibits use of environmental modification techniques to cause earthquakes and tsunamis, amongst other phenomena.

== Conspiracy theories ==
After natural tectonic phenomena such as the 2010 Haiti earthquake, conspiracy theories, usually relating to the armed forces of the United States and formerly the Soviet Union (USSR), often arise, though no evidence is advanced. After the Haiti earthquake it was widely reported that president Hugo Chávez of Venezuela made unsupported allegations that it had been caused by testing of a US tectonic weapon. The newspaper Komsomolskaya Pravda of Moscow reported on page 1 on 30 May 1992 that "a geophysical or tectonic weapon was actually developed in the USSR despite the UN Convention", but that Chief Seismologist Major-General V Bochrov of the USSR Ministry of Defence categorically rejected any hints on the existence of tectonic weapons. On 8 February 2023, Romanian Senator Diana Iovanovici Șoșoacă accused the United States of having caused the 2023 Turkey–Syria earthquakes using a seismic weapon. Following the 2026 Venezuela earthquakes, posts on social media (most notably, X and Instagram) began blaming the US HAARP project, which has been the target of numerous conspiracy theories for years and is falsely credited with the ability to cause earthquakes, hurricanes, floods, forest fires or even control the climate. Scientists, fact-checkers and programme heads say there is no evidence it can trigger quakes.

== "Earthquake bombs" ==
While the British Tallboy and Grand Slam bombs of World War II were called earthquake bombs, the name came from their way of destroying very hardened targets by shaking their foundations as an earthquake would; they were never intended to cause an actual earthquake.

== See also ==
- Red mercury
- HAARP
