= Tsunami bomb =

Hypothetical tectonic weapon causing tsunamis

The tsunami bomb was an attempt during World War II to develop a tectonic weapon that could create destructive tsunamis. The project commenced after United States Navy officer E. A. Gibson noticed small waves generated by explosions used to clear coral reefs. The idea was developed by the United States and New Zealand military in a program code named Project Seal. The weapons concept was deemed feasible, but the weapons themselves were never fully developed or used. While perhaps technically feasible, the same nuclear yield deployed instead as an airburst would be expected to be far more devastating.

== Testing and development ==
Tests were conducted by Professor Thomas Leech, of the University of Auckland, in Whangaparaoa off the coast of Auckland and off New Caledonia between 1944 and 1945. British and US defence chiefs were eager to see it developed, and it was considered potentially as important as the atomic bomb. It was expected to cause massive damage to coastal cities or coastal defences.

The weapon was only tested using small explosions and never on a full scale. 3,700 test explosions were conducted over a seven-month period. The tests revealed that a single explosion would not produce a tsunami, but concluded that a line of 2,000,000 kg (4,400,000 lb) of explosives about 8 km (5.0 mi) off the coast could create a destructive wave.

Details of the experiments codenamed "Project Seal" were released to the public by the Ministry of Foreign Affairs and Trade in 1999 and are available at Archives New Zealand in Wellington and at the Scripps Institution of Oceanography Archives in San Diego, California.

A 1968 research report sponsored by the US Office of Naval Research addressed this hypothesis of coastal damage due to large explosion-generated waves, and found theoretical and experimental evidence showing it to be relatively inefficient in wave-making potential, with most wave energy dissipated by breaking on the continental shelf before reaching the shore.

Analysis of the declassified documents in 1999 by the University of Waikato suggested the weapon would be viable.

No specific targets for the weapon were identified, but in 2013 New Zealand broadcaster and author Ray Waru suggested coastal fortifications in Japan ahead of an invasion of the Japanese home islands.

Egyptian magazine Al-Osboa claimed that the 2004 Indian Ocean earthquake and tsunami was intentionally caused by a nuclear weapon detonated in a strategic position under the ocean.

=== Soviet Union ===
In his memoirs, Andrei Sakharov wrote that in 1961 he considered a high-yield nuclear torpedo used to attack ports. He wrote that such a weapon would be easy to detect and destroy enroute and that development would result in radioactive contamination of the ocean, making it impossible to carry out in secret. Modern descriptions of supposed tsunami producing nuclear torpedoes often cite Sakharov has the origin of the concept, though similar claims of tsunami generation were made about the never deployed T-15 torpedo.

During the Cold War, underwater explosions were thought to operate under the same principles as tsunamis, potentially increasing dramatically in height as they move over shallow water, and flooding the land beyond the shoreline. Later research concluded that waves generated by underwater explosions differ from those generated by earthquakes and landslides.

=== Russia ===
Russian officials and state-aligned media have described the nuclear-powered, nuclear-armed unmanned underwater vehicle named Status-6, also referred to as the Poseidon torpedo, as a weapon intended to detonate near coastlines and cause extensive damage and radioactive contamination.

Russian media and international tabloids have claimed the Poseidon torpedo could generate extremely large tsunami waves, with Russian TV host and propagandist Dmitry Kiselyov claiming a wave "up to 500 meters high" could be produced. Experts reviewing the claims have been quoted as saying such a tsunami scenario is unrealistic.

=== North Korea ===
In 2023, the KCNA reported a test of underwater attack drone "Haeil" off Hongwon Bay. Reportedly after cruising around 80–150 metres (260–490 ft) underwater, it creates an explosion that subsequently creates a radioactive wave.

== Related weapons development elsewhere ==
Animation of the principle of the bouncing bomb. The bomb is dropped close to the surface of the lake. Because it is moving almost horizontally, at high velocity and with backspin, it bounces several times instead of sinking. Each bounce is smaller than the previous one. The "bomb run" is calculated so that at its final bounce, the bomb will reach close to the target, where it sinks. A depth charge causes it to explode at the right depth, creating destructive shockwaves.

The bouncing bomb was a five-ton bomb developed, separately, during World War II. Like the tsunami bomb, it was also designed to explode in water, and one of its intended effects was to cause massive flooding. However its targets were the massive reinforced dams of Nazi Germany, which were deemed untouchable by ordinary weapons yet, if broken, would cause extensive harm to Germany's war effort. The bombs' most unusual feature was that they were deliberately spun backwards before dropping; this backspin caused them to skip along the surface of the water for a set distance before sinking, and allowed them to evade torpedo nets that protected the dams before exploding underwater similarly to a depth charge. The inventor of the first such bomb was the British engineer Barnes Wallis, whose "Upkeep" bouncing bomb was used in the RAF's Operation Chastise of May 1943 to bounce into German dams and explode underwater, with effect similar to the underground detonation of the Grand Slam and Tallboy earthquake bombs, both of which he also invented. His April 1942 paper "Spherical Bomb—Surface Torpedo" described this method of attack. The weapons were used successfully against three dams in 1943.

The earthquake bomb, or seismic bomb, was a separate but related concept that was separately invented by the British aeronautical engineer Barnes Wallis early in World War II and subsequently developed and used on land against strategic targets in Europe. The earthquake bomb also used the concept of an explosion in a dense medium. It differed somewhat in concept from traditional aircraft-borne bombs, which usually explode at or near the surface, and destroy their target directly by explosive force. By contrast, an earthquake bomb is dropped from very high altitude to gain more speed, and upon impact penetrates and explodes deep underground, causing massive caverns (camouflets) or craters as well as much more severe shockwaves. In this way, they can affect targets that are too massive to be affected by other types of conventional bomb, as well as difficult targets such as bridges and viaducts. Earthquake bombs were used towards the end of World War II for massively reinforced installations (e.g., submarine pens with concrete walls several meters thick, caverns, buried tunnels), and bridges.

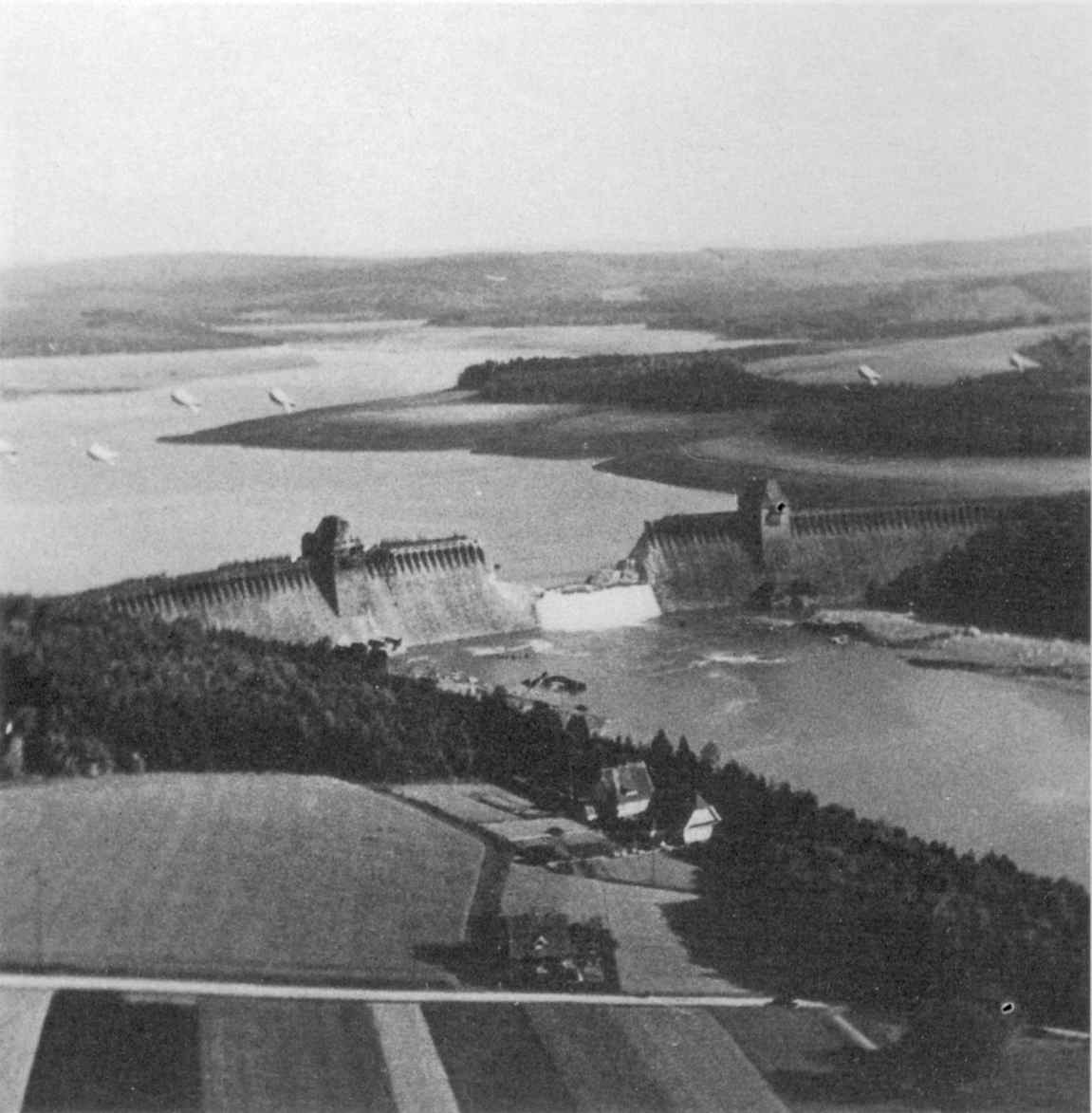
The Möhne dam breached by Upkeep bombs

== See also ==
- Halifax explosion, which triggered a tsunami in the harbor area.
- Poseidon, a nuclear-powered and nuclear-armed unmanned underwater vehicle
