= Tesla's oscillator =

Steam-powered electric generator

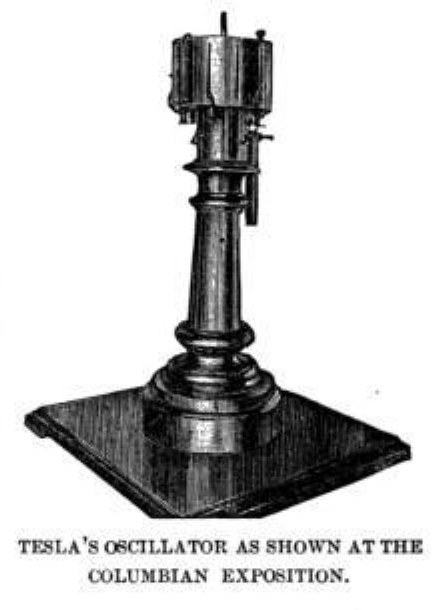
An oscillator that was among the exhibits Tesla demonstrated at the World's Columbian Exposition in 1893.

Tesla's electro-mechanical oscillator is a steam-powered electric generator patented by Nikola Tesla in 1893. Later in life, Tesla claimed one version of the oscillator caused an earthquake in New York City in 1898, gaining it the colloquial title "Tesla's earthquake machine".

== Description ==
Tesla's oscillator is a reciprocating electricity generator. Steam would be forced into the oscillator, and exit through a series of ports, pushing a piston up and down that was attached to an armature, causing it to vibrate up and down at high speed, producing electricity. The casing's upper chamber had to withstand pressures of 400 psi (2.8 MPa) and temperatures exceeding 200 °C. Some versions used air trapped behind the piston as an "air spring", increasing efficiency. Another variation used electromagnets to control the frequency of the piston's oscillation.

Tesla developed many versions of the oscillator and looked on it as a possible replacement for inefficient reciprocating steam engines used to turn generators, but it was superseded by the development of highly efficient steam turbines. Tesla also used the highly regular tunable oscillation of the device to set frequency in his high frequency electrical and wireless transmission experiments. There are also claims that it had a physiological effect on people subjected to its vibrations in that it acted as a laxative causing people to immediately run to the bathroom afterwards.

== "Earthquake" claims ==
In 1935, at his annual birthday party/press meeting, 79-year-old Tesla related a story where he claimed a version of his mechanical oscillator caused extreme vibrations in structures and even an earthquake in downtown New York City. Reporter John J. O'Neill's biography of Nikola Tesla includes a version of this story (date of the telling not given).

One version of the story has Tesla experimenting with a small version of his mechanical oscillator at his laboratory on 46 East Houston Street near the Manhattan neighborhood of SoHo. Tesla said the oscillator was around 7 inches (18 cm) long and weighing 1 or 2 pounds (450 or 910 g), something "you could put in your overcoat pocket". At one point, while experimenting with the oscillator, he alleged it generated a resonance in several buildings, causing complaints to the police. As the speed grew, he said that the machine oscillated at the resonance frequency of his own building and, belatedly realizing the danger, he was forced to use a sledgehammer to terminate the experiment, just as the police arrived. Other versions have Tesla smashing the device before the police arrive and have multi-ton equipment in the basement moving around. Another version has Tesla clamping an oscillator to a building under construction and causing it to vibrate so violently the steelworkers working on it left the building in a panic.

At the 1935 party, Tesla also claimed the mechanical oscillator could destroy the Empire State Building with "Five pounds of air pressure" (34 kPa) if attached to a girder and that he expected to earn $100 million from the oscillator within two years.

=== MythBusters ===
The oscillator/"earthquake machine" was explored in 2006 in Episode 60 – "Earthquake Machine". The MythBusters made a device powered by electricity rather than steam. It produced vibrations that could be felt hundreds of feet away, but no earthquake shaking on the bridge they attached to; they judged that the claim that the device produced an earthquake to be false (i.e. a "busted myth").

== See also ==
- List of Tesla patents
- Tectonic weapon
- Tesla turbine
