= Tsunami =

Series of water waves

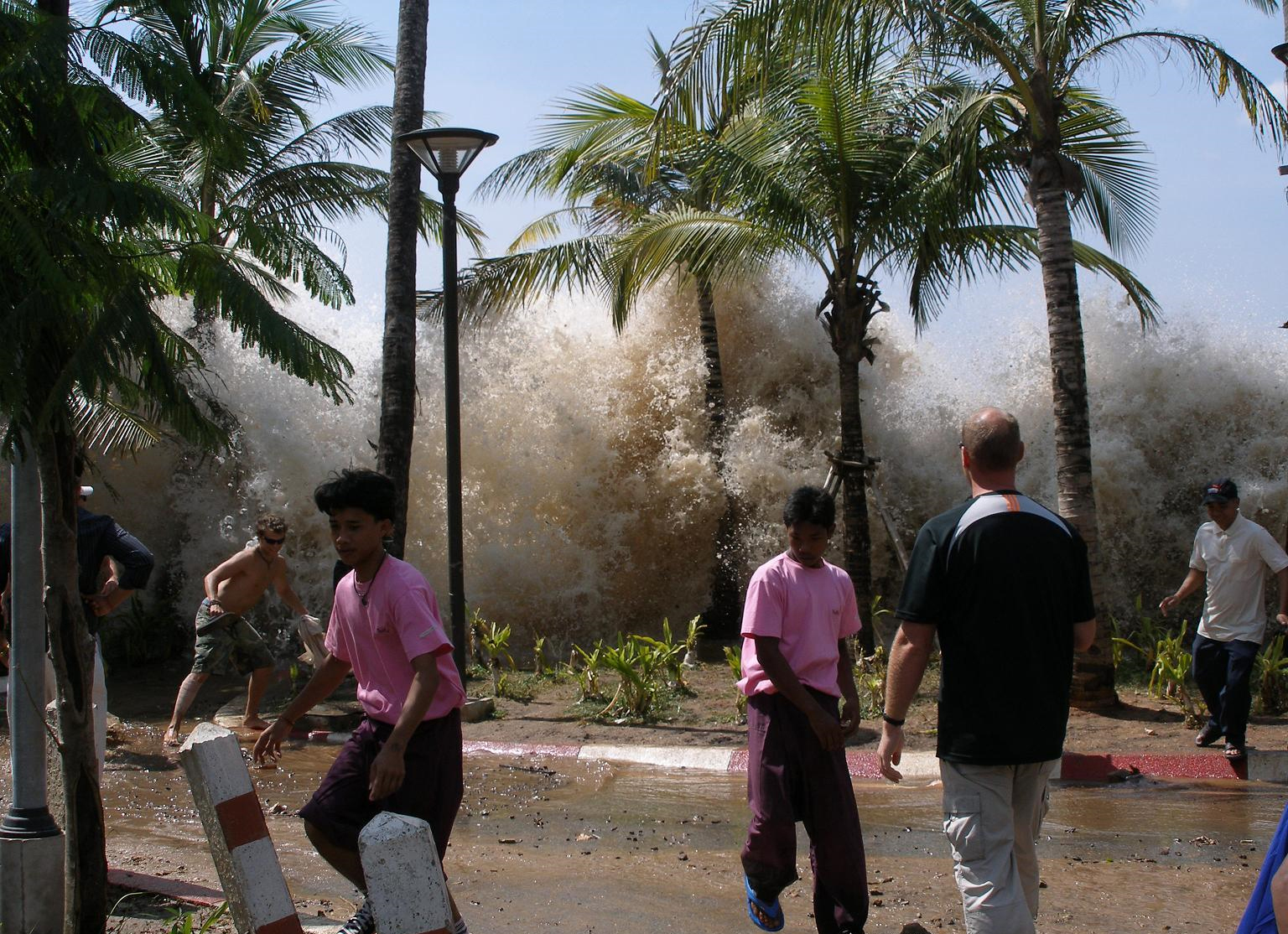
The 2004 Indian Ocean tsunami at Ao Nang, Krabi Province, Thailand

A tsunami (/(t)suːˈnɑːmi, (t)sʊˈ-/ (t)soo-NAH-mee, (t)suu-; from Japanese: 津波, lit. 'harbour wave', pronounced [tsɯnami]) is a series of waves in a water body caused by the displacement of a large volume of water, generally in an ocean or a large lake. Earthquakes, volcanic eruptions, underwater explosions, landslides, glacier calvings, meteorite impacts and other disturbances above or below water all have the potential to generate a tsunami. Unlike normal ocean waves, which are generated by wind, or tides, which are in turn generated by the gravitational pull of the Moon and the Sun, a tsunami is generated by the displacement of water from a large event.

Tsunami waves do not resemble normal undersea currents or sea waves because their wavelength is far longer. Rather than appearing as a breaking wave, a tsunami may instead initially resemble a rapidly rising tide. For this reason, it is often referred to as a tidal wave, although this usage is not favoured by the scientific community because it might give the false impression of a causal relationship between tides and tsunamis. Tsunamis generally consist of a series of waves, with periods ranging from minutes to hours, arriving in a so-called "wave train". Wave heights of tens of metres can be generated by large events. Although the impact of tsunamis is limited to coastal areas, their destructive power can be enormous, and they can affect entire ocean basins. The 2004 Indian Ocean tsunami was among the deadliest natural disasters in human history, with at least 230,000 people killed or missing in 14 countries bordering the Indian Ocean.

The Ancient Greek historian Thucydides suggested in his 5th century BC History of the Peloponnesian War that tsunamis were related to submarine earthquakes, but the understanding of tsunamis remained slim until the 20th century, and much remains unknown. Major areas of current research include determining why some large earthquakes do not generate tsunamis while other smaller ones do. This ongoing research is designed to help accurately forecast the passage of tsunamis across oceans as well as how tsunami waves interact with shorelines.

== Terminology ==
=== Tsunami ===
Tsunami
- "Tsunami" in kanji

Japanese name
- Kanji: 津波
- Hiragana: つなみ
- Katakana: ツナミ
Transcriptions
- Romanization: tsunami

The term "tsunami" is a borrowing from the Japanese tsunami (津波), meaning 'harbour wave'. For the plural, one can either follow ordinary English practice and add an s, or use an invariable plural as in the Japanese. Most English speakers alter the word's initial /ts/ to an /s/ by dropping the "t," since English does not natively permit /ts/ at the beginning of words, though the original Japanese pronunciation is /ts/. The term has become commonly accepted in English, although its literal Japanese meaning is not necessarily descriptive of the waves, which do not occur only in harbours.

=== Tidal wave ===
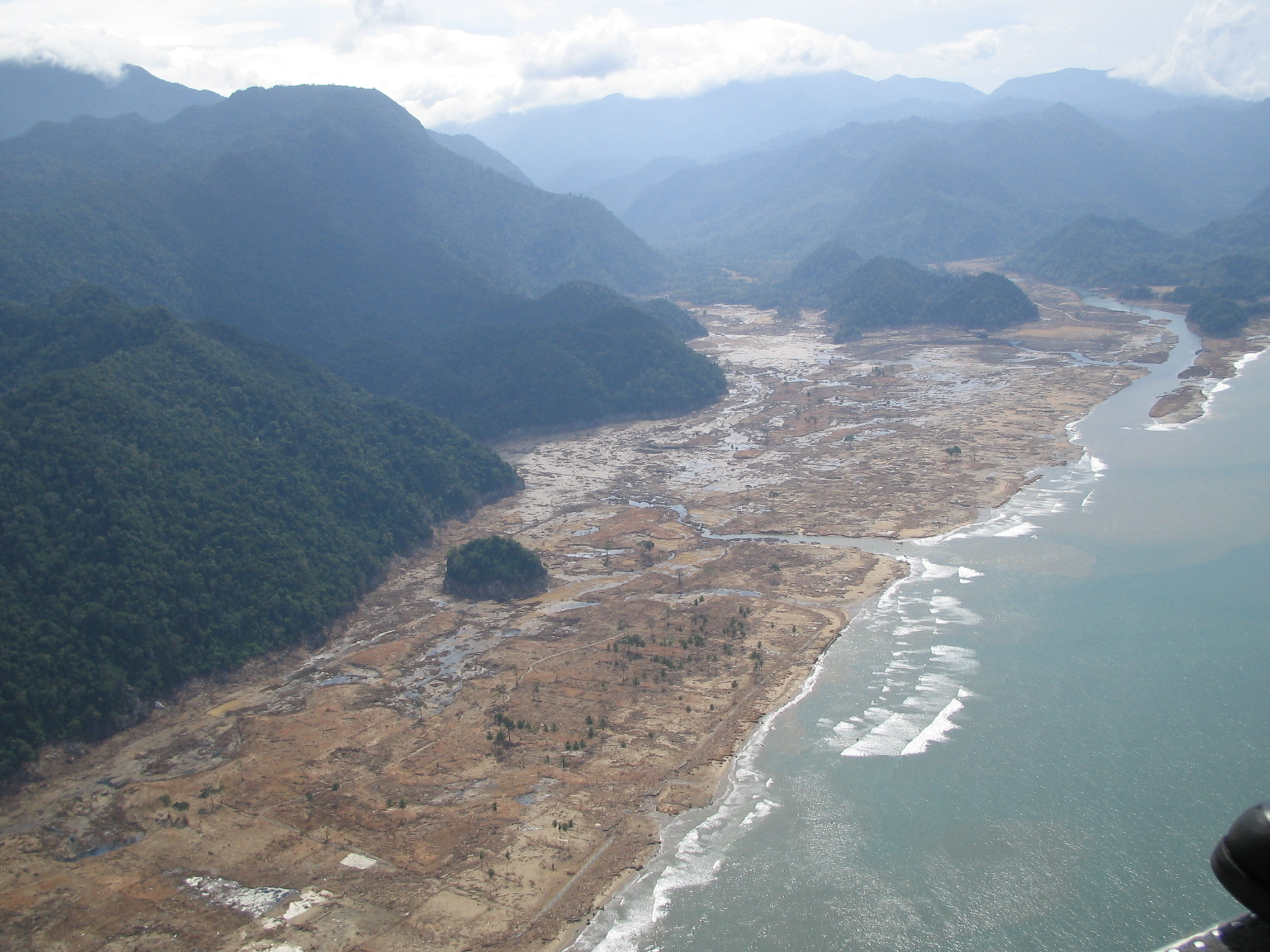
Tsunami aftermath in Aceh, Indonesia, December 2004

Tsunamis are sometimes referred to as tidal waves. This once-popular term derives from the most common appearance of a tsunami, which is that of an extraordinarily high tidal bore. Tsunamis and tides both produce waves of water that move inland, but in the case of a tsunami, the inland movement of water may be much greater, giving the impression of an incredibly high and forceful tide. In recent years, the term "tidal wave" has fallen out of favour, especially in the scientific community, because the causes of tsunamis have nothing to do with those of tides, which are produced by the gravitational pull of the moon and sun rather than the displacement of water. Although the meanings of "tidal" include "resembling" or "having the form or character of" tides, use of the term tidal wave is discouraged by geologists and oceanographers.

=== Seismic sea wave ===
The term seismic sea wave is also used to refer to the phenomenon because the waves most often are generated by seismic activity such as earthquakes. Prior to the rise of the use of the term tsunami in English, scientists generally encouraged the use of the term seismic sea wave rather than tidal wave. However, like tidal wave, seismic sea wave is not a completely accurate term, as forces other than earthquakes—including underwater landslides, volcanic eruptions, underwater explosions, land or ice slumping into the ocean, meteorite impacts, and the weather when the atmospheric pressure changes very rapidly—can generate such waves by displacing water.

=== Other terms ===
The use of the term tsunami for waves created by landslides entering bodies of water has become internationally widespread in both scientific and popular literature, although such waves are distinct in origin from large waves generated by earthquakes. This distinction sometimes leads to the use of other terms for landslide-generated waves, including landslide-triggered tsunami, displacement wave, non-seismic wave, impact wave, and, simply, giant wave.

A tsunami which cannot be linked to an earthquake is sometimes termed an "orphan tsunami". This may happen in the case of tsunamis caused in the distant past, before international communications, by earthquakes far away, such as a tsunami in Japan caused by an earthquake in the Americas.

== History ==
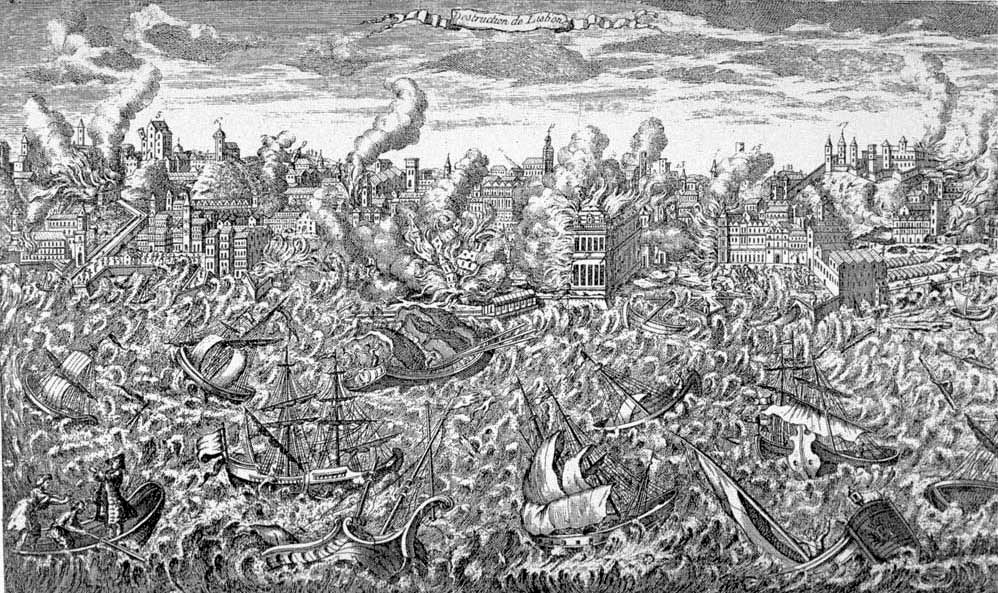
Lisbon earthquake and tsunami in November 1755

Japan has the longest recorded history of tsunamis dating back to as early as 684 CE.

As early as 426 BC the Greek historian Thucydides inquired in his book History of the Peloponnesian War about the causes of tsunami, and was the first to argue that ocean earthquakes must be the cause. The oldest human record of a tsunami dates back to 479 BC, in the Greek colony of Potidaea, thought to be triggered by an earthquake. The tsunami may have saved the colony from an invasion by the Achaemenid Empire.

The cause, in my opinion, of this phenomenon must be sought in the earthquake. At the point where its shock has been the most violent the sea is driven back, and suddenly recoiling with redoubled force, causes the inundation. Without an earthquake I do not see how such an accident could happen.

The Roman historian Ammianus Marcellinus (Res Gestae 26.10.15–19) described the typical sequence of a tsunami, including an incipient earthquake, the sudden retreat of the sea and a following gigantic wave, after the 365 AD tsunami devastated Alexandria.

Tsunamis are an often underestimated hazard in the Mediterranean Sea and parts of Europe. Of historical and current (with regard to risk assumptions) importance are the 1755 Lisbon earthquake and tsunami, the 1783 Calabrian earthquakes, each causing several tens of thousands of deaths and the 1908 Messina earthquake and tsunami. The tsunami claimed more than 123,000 lives in Sicily and Calabria and is among the deadliest natural disasters in modern Europe. The Storegga Slide in the Norwegian Sea and some examples of tsunamis affecting the British Isles refer to landslide and meteotsunamis, predominantly and less to earthquake-induced waves.

The destruction caused by the 2004 Indian Ocean earthquake and tsunami event mark it as the most devastating of its kind in modern times, killing around 230,000 people. The Sumatran region is also accustomed to tsunamis, due to earthquakes of varying magnitudes that occur regularly off the coast of the island.

== Causes ==
The principal generation mechanism of a tsunami is the displacement of a substantial volume of water or perturbation of the sea. This displacement of water is usually caused by earthquakes, but can also be attributed to landslides, volcanic eruptions, glacier calvings or more rarely by meteorites and nuclear tests. However, the possibility of a meteorite causing a tsunami is debated.

=== Seismicity ===
Tsunamis can be generated when the sea floor abruptly deforms and vertically displaces the overlying water. Tectonic earthquakes are a particular kind of earthquake that are associated with the Earth's crustal deformation; when these earthquakes occur beneath the sea, the water above the deformed area is displaced from its equilibrium position. More specifically, a tsunami can be generated when thrust faults associated with convergent or destructive plate boundaries move abruptly, resulting in water displacement, owing to the vertical component of movement involved. Movement on normal (extensional) faults can also cause displacement of the seabed, but only the largest of such events (typically related to flexure in the outer trench swell) cause enough displacement to give rise to a significant tsunami, such as the 1977 Sumba and 1933 Sanriku events.

Drawing of tectonic plate boundary before earthquake

Over-riding plate bulges under strain, causing tectonic uplift.

Plate slips, causing subsidence and releasing energy into water.

The energy released produces tsunami waves.

Tsunamis have a small wave height offshore, and a very long wavelength (often hundreds of kilometres long, whereas normal ocean waves have a wavelength of only 30 or 40 metres), which is why they generally pass unnoticed at sea, forming only a slight swell usually about 300 millimetres (12 in) above the normal sea surface. They grow in height when they reach shallower water, in a wave shoaling process described below. A tsunami can occur in any tidal state and even at low tide can still inundate coastal areas.

On April 1, 1946, the 8.6 M_{w} Aleutian Islands earthquake occurred with a maximum Mercalli intensity of VI (Strong). It generated a tsunami which inundated Hilo on the island of Hawaii with a 14-metre-high (46 ft) surge. Between 165 and 173 were killed. It also destroyed the village in the Halawa Valley of Molokai, though the residents fled to higher ground when some saw the ocean recede, and rang alarm bells, so nobody was killed, though the village was obliterated. The area where the earthquake occurred is where the Pacific Ocean floor is subducting (or being pushed downwards) under Alaska.

Examples of tsunamis originating at locations away from convergent boundaries include Storegga about 8,000 years ago, Grand Banks in 1929, and Papua New Guinea in 1998 (Tappin, 2001). The Grand Banks and Papua New Guinea tsunamis came from earthquakes which destabilised sediments, causing them to flow into the ocean and generate a tsunami. They dissipated before travelling transoceanic distances.

The cause of the Storegga sediment failure is unknown. Possibilities include an overloading of the sediments, an earthquake or a release of gas hydrates (methane etc.).

The 1960 Valdivia earthquake (M_{w} 9.5), 1964 Alaska earthquake (M_{w} 9.2), 2004 Indian Ocean earthquake (M_{w} 9.2), and 2011 Tōhoku earthquake (M_{w}9.0) are recent examples of powerful megathrust earthquakes that generated tsunamis (known as teletsunamis) that can cross entire oceans. Smaller (M_{w} 4.2) earthquakes in Japan can trigger tsunamis (called local and regional tsunamis) that can devastate stretches of coastline, but can do so in only a few minutes at a time.

=== Landslides ===
The Tauredunum event was a large tsunami on Lake Geneva in 563 CE, caused by sedimentary deposits destabilised by a landslide.

In the 1950s, it was discovered that tsunamis larger than had previously been believed possible can be caused by giant submarine landslides. These large volumes of rapidly displaced water transfer energy at a faster rate than the water can absorb. Their existence was confirmed in 1958, when a giant landslide in Lituya Bay, Alaska, caused the highest wave ever recorded, which had a height of 524 metres (1,719 ft). The wave did not travel far as it struck land almost immediately. The wave struck three boats—each with two people aboard—anchored in the bay. One boat rode out the wave, but the wave sank the other two, killing both people aboard one of them.

Another landslide-tsunami event occurred in 1963 when a massive landslide from Monte Toc entered the reservoir behind the Vajont Dam in Italy. The resulting wave surged over the 262-metre (860 ft)-high dam by 250 metres (820 ft) and destroyed several towns. Around 2,000 people died. Scientists named these waves megatsunamis.

Some geologists claim that large landslides from volcanic islands, e.g. Cumbre Vieja on La Palma (Cumbre Vieja tsunami hazard) in the Canary Islands, may be able to generate megatsunamis that can cross oceans, but this is disputed by many others.

In general, landslides generate displacements mainly in the shallower parts of the coastline, and there is conjecture about the nature of large landslides that enter the water. This has been shown to subsequently affect water in enclosed bays and lakes, but a landslide large enough to cause a transoceanic tsunami has not occurred within recorded history. Susceptible locations are believed to be the Big Island of Hawaii, Fogo in the Cape Verde Islands, La Reunion in the Indian Ocean, and Cumbre Vieja on the island of La Palma in the Canary Islands; along with other volcanic ocean islands. This is because large masses of relatively unconsolidated volcanic material occurs on the flanks and in some cases detachment planes are believed to be developing. However, there is growing controversy about how dangerous these slopes actually are.

=== Volcanic eruptions ===
Other than by landslides or sector collapse, volcanoes may be able to generate waves by pyroclastic flow submergence, caldera collapse, or underwater explosions. Tsunamis have been triggered by a number of volcanic eruptions. The best-known is perhaps the massive tsunami caused by the eruption of the Santorini volcano around 1600 BC, which is often mentioned as driving the destruction of many harbours in the region and ultimately the decline of Minoan civilization - a question still subject to open debate. Others include the 1883 eruption of Krakatoa, and the 2022 Hunga Tonga–Hunga Ha'apai eruption. Over 20% of all fatalities caused by volcanism during the past 250 years are estimated to have been caused by volcanogenic tsunamis.

Debate has persisted over the origins and source mechanisms of such tsunamis as those generated by Krakatoa in 1883, and they remain lesser understood than their seismic relatives. This poses the larger problem of awareness and preparedness, as exemplified by the eruption and collapse of Anak Krakatoa in 2018, which killed 426 and injured thousands when no warning was available. In all cases, developing better tsunami forecasting models and assessing the risks for densely populated coastal areas to be hit by severe tsunamis is a matter of global priority.

It is still regarded that lateral landslides and ocean-entering pyroclastic currents are most likely to generate the largest and most hazardous waves from volcanism; however, field investigation of the Tongan event, as well as developments in numerical modelling methods, currently aim to expand the understanding of the other source mechanisms.

=== Meteorological ===
Some meteorological conditions, especially rapid changes in barometric pressure, as seen with the passing of a front, can displace bodies of water enough to cause trains of waves with wavelengths. These are comparable to seismic tsunamis, but usually with lower energies. Essentially, they are dynamically equivalent to seismic tsunamis, the only differences being 1) that meteotsunamis lack the transoceanic reach of significant seismic tsunamis, and 2) that the force that displaces the water is sustained over some length of time such that meteotsunamis cannot be modelled as having been caused instantaneously. In spite of their lower energies, on shorelines where they can be amplified by resonance, they are sometimes powerful enough to cause localised damage and potential for loss of life. They have been documented in many places, including the Great Lakes, the Aegean Sea, the English Channel, and the Balearic Islands, where they are common enough to have a local name, rissaga. In Sicily they are called marubbio and in Nagasaki Bay, they are called abiki. Some examples of destructive meteotsunamis include 31 March 1979 at Nagasaki and 15 June 2006 at Menorca, the latter causing damage in the tens of millions of euros.

Meteotsunamis should not be confused with storm surges, which are local increases in sea level associated with the low barometric pressure of passing tropical cyclones, nor should they be confused with setup, the temporary local raising of sea level caused by strong on-shore winds. Storm surges and setup are also dangerous causes of coastal flooding in severe weather but their dynamics are completely unrelated to tsunami waves. They are unable to propagate beyond their sources, as waves do.

=== Human-made or triggered tsunamis ===
The accidental Halifax Explosion in 1917 triggered an 18-metre (59 ft) high tsunami in the harbour at Halifax, Nova Scotia, Canada.

There have been studies of the potential for the use of explosives to induce tsunamis as a tectonic weapon. As early as World War II (1939–1945), consideration of the use of conventional explosives was explored, and New Zealand's military forces initiated Project Seal, which attempted to create small tsunamis with explosives in the area of what is now Shakespear Regional Park at the tip of the Whangaparāoa Peninsula in the Auckland Region of New Zealand; the attempt failed.

There has been considerable speculation about the possibility of using nuclear weapons to cause tsunamis near an enemy coastline. Nuclear testing in the Pacific Proving Ground by the United States generated poor results. In Operation Crossroads in July 1946, two 20-kilotonne-of-TNT (84 TJ) bombs were detonated, one in the air over and one underwater within the shallow waters of the 50-metre (164 ft) deep lagoon at Bikini Atoll. The bombs detonated about 6 km (3.7 mi; 3.2 nmi) from the nearest island, where the waves were no higher than 3 to 4 m (9.8 to 13.1 ft) when they reached the shoreline. Other underwater tests, mainly Operation Hardtack I/Wahoo in deep water and Operation Hardtack I/Umbrella in shallow water, confirmed the results. Analysis of the effects of shallow and deep underwater explosions indicate that the energy of the explosions does not easily generate the kind of deep, all-ocean waveforms typical of tsunamis because most of the energy creates steam, causes vertical fountains above the water, and creates compressional waveforms. Tsunamis are hallmarked by permanent large vertical displacements of very large volumes of water which do not occur in explosions.

== Characteristics ==
When the wave enters shallow water, it slows down and its amplitude (height) increases.

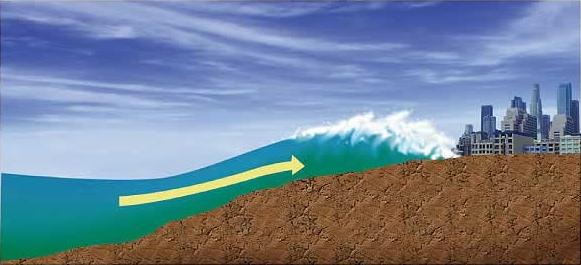
The wave further slows and amplifies as it hits land. Only the largest waves crest.

Tsunamis are caused by earthquakes, landslides, volcanic explosions, glacier calvings, and bolides. They cause damage by two mechanisms: the smashing force of a wall of water travelling at high speed, and the destructive power of a large volume of water draining off the land and carrying a large amount of debris with it, even with waves that do not appear to be large.

While everyday wind waves have a wavelength (from crest to crest) of about 100 metres (330 ft) and a height of roughly 2 metres (6.6 ft), a tsunami in the deep ocean has a much larger wavelength of up to 200 kilometres (120 mi). Such a wave travels at well over 800 kilometres per hour (500 mph), but owing to the enormous wavelength the wave oscillation at any given point takes 20 or 30 minutes to complete a cycle and has an amplitude of only about 1 metre (3.3 ft). This makes tsunamis difficult to detect over deep water, where ships are unable to feel their passage.

The velocity of a tsunami can be calculated by obtaining the square root of the depth of the water in metres multiplied by the acceleration due to gravity (approximated to 10 m/s^{2}). For example, if the Pacific Ocean is considered to have a depth of 5000 metres, the velocity of a tsunami would be √5000 × 10 = √50000 ≈ 224 metres per second (730 ft/s), which equates to a speed of about 806 kilometres per hour (501 mph). This is the formula used for calculating the velocity of shallow-water waves. Even the deep ocean is shallow in this sense because a tsunami wave is so long (horizontally from crest to crest) by comparison.

The reason for the Japanese name "harbour wave" is that sometimes a village's fishermen would sail out, and encounter no unusual waves while out at sea fishing, and come back to land to find their village devastated by a huge wave.

As the tsunami approaches the coast and the waters become shallow, wave shoaling compresses the wave and its speed decreases below 80 kilometres per hour (50 mph). Its wavelength diminishes to less than 20 kilometres (12 mi) and its amplitude grows enormously—in accord with Green's law. Since the wave still has the same very long period, the tsunami may take minutes to reach full height. Except for the very largest tsunamis, the approaching wave does not break, but rather appears like a fast-moving tidal bore. Open bays and coastlines adjacent to very deep water may shape the tsunami further into a step-like wave with a steep-breaking front.

When the tsunami's wave peak reaches the shore, the resulting temporary rise in sea level is termed run up. Run up is measured in metres above a reference sea level. A large tsunami may feature multiple waves arriving over a period of hours, with significant time between the wave crests. The first wave to reach the shore may not have the highest run-up.

About 80% of tsunamis occur in the Pacific Ocean, but they are possible wherever there are large bodies of water, including lakes. However, tsunami interactions with shorelines and the seafloor topography are extremely complex, which leaves some countries more vulnerable than others. For example, the Pacific coasts of the United States and Mexico lie adjacent to each other, but the United States has recorded ten tsunamis in the region since 1788, while Mexico has recorded twenty-five since 1732. Similarly, Japan has had more than a hundred tsunamis in recorded history, while the neighbouring island of Taiwan has registered only two, in 1781 and 1867.

== Drawback ==
An illustration of the rhythmic "drawback" of surface water associated with a wave. It follows that a very large drawback may herald the arrival of a very large wave.

All waves have a positive and negative peak; that is, a ridge and a trough. In the case of a propagating wave like a tsunami, either may be the first to arrive. If the first part to arrive at the shore is the ridge, a massive breaking wave or sudden flooding will be the first effect noticed on land. However, if the first part to arrive is a trough, a drawback will occur as the shoreline recedes dramatically, exposing normally submerged areas. The drawback can exceed hundreds of metres, and people unaware of the danger sometimes remain near the shore to satisfy their curiosity or to collect fish from the exposed seabed.

A typical wave period for a damaging tsunami is about twelve minutes. Thus, the sea recedes in the drawback phase, with areas well below sea level exposed after three minutes. For the next six minutes, the wave trough builds into a ridge which may flood the coast, and destruction ensues. During the next six minutes, the wave changes from a ridge to a trough, and the flood waters recede in a second drawback. Victims and debris may be swept into the ocean. The process repeats with succeeding waves.

== Scales of intensity and magnitude ==
As with earthquakes, several attempts have been made to set up scales of tsunami intensity or magnitude to allow comparison between different events.

=== Intensity scales ===
The first scales used routinely to measure the intensity of tsunamis were the Sieberg-Ambraseys scale (1962), used in the Mediterranean Sea and the Imamura-Iida intensity scale (1963), used in the Pacific Ocean. The latter scale was modified by Soloviev (1972), who calculated the tsunami intensity "I" according to the formula:

$$\mathit{I} = \frac{1}{2} + \log_{2} \mathit{H}_{av}$$

where $\mathit{H}_{av}$ is the "tsunami height" in metres, averaged along the nearest coastline, with the tsunami height defined as the rise of the water level above the normal tidal level at the time of occurrence of the tsunami. This scale, known as the Soloviev-Imamura tsunami intensity scale, is used in the global tsunami catalogues compiled by the NGDC/NOAA and the Novosibirsk Tsunami Laboratory as the main parameter for the size of the tsunami.

This formula yields:

- I = 2 for $\mathit{H}_{av}$ = 2.8 metres
- I = 3 for $\mathit{H}_{av}$ = 5.5 metres
- I = 4 for $\mathit{H}_{av}$ = 11 metres
- I = 5 for $\mathit{H}_{av}$ = 22.5 metres
- etc.

In 2013, following the intensively studied tsunamis in 2004 and 2011, a new 12-point scale was proposed, the Integrated Tsunami Intensity Scale (ITIS-2012), intended to match as closely as possible to the modified ESI2007 and EMS earthquake intensity scales.

=== Magnitude scales ===
The first scale that genuinely calculated a magnitude for a tsunami, rather than an intensity at a particular location was the ML scale proposed by Murty & Loomis based on the potential energy. Difficulties in calculating the potential energy of the tsunami mean that this scale is rarely used. Abe introduced the tsunami magnitude scale $\mathit{M}_{t}$, calculated from,

$$\mathit{M}_{t} = {a} \log h + {b} \log R + \mathit{D}$$

where h is the maximum tsunami-wave amplitude (in m) measured by a tide gauge at a distance R from the epicentre, a, b and D are constants used to make the M_{t} scale match as closely as possible with the moment magnitude scale.

== Tsunami heights ==
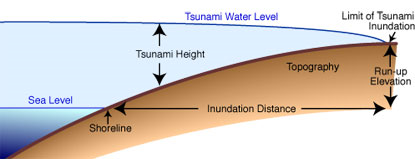
Diagram showing several measures to describe a tsunami size, including height, inundation and run-up

Several terms are used to describe the different characteristics of tsunami in terms of their height:

- Amplitude, Wave Height, or Tsunami Height: Refers to the height of a tsunami relative to the normal sea level at the time of the tsunami, which may be tidal High Water, or Low Water. It is different from the crest-to-trough height which is commonly used to measure other type of wave height.
- Run-up Height, or Inundation Height: The height reached by a tsunami on the ground above sea level, Maximum run-up height refers to the maximum height reached by water above sea level, which is sometimes reported as the maximum height reached by a tsunami.
- Flow Depth: Refers to the height of tsunami above ground, regardless of the height of the location or sea level.
- (Maximum) Water Level: Maximum height above sea level as seen from trace or water mark. Different from maximum run-up height in the sense that they are not necessarily water marks at inundation line/limit.

== Warnings and predictions ==
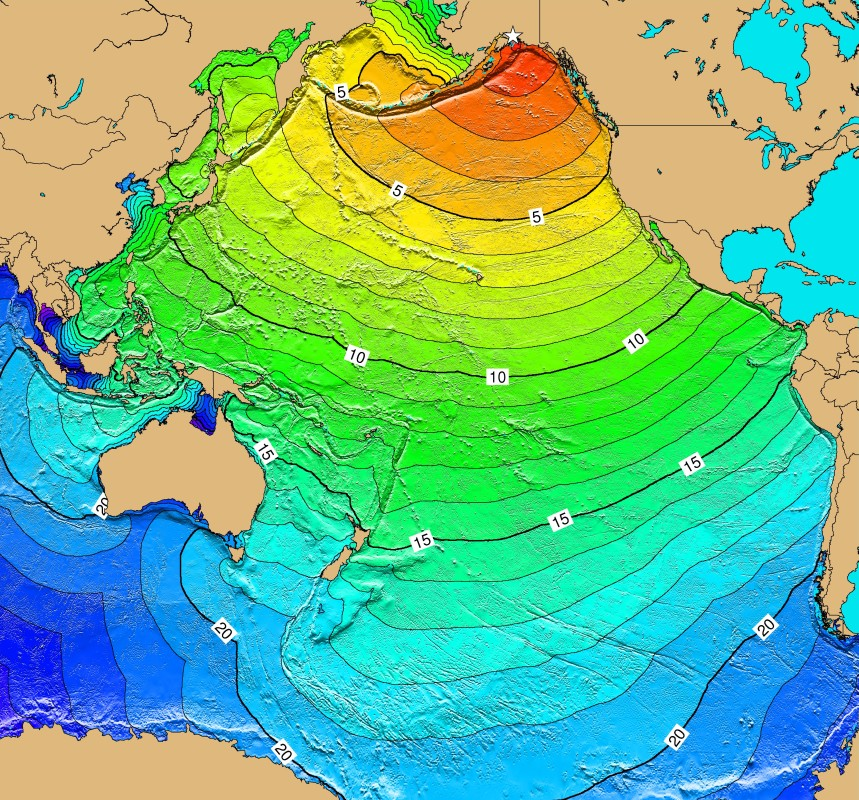
Calculated travel time map for the 1964 Alaska tsunami (in hours)

Drawbacks can serve as a brief warning. People who observe drawback (many survivors report an accompanying sucking sound) can survive only if they immediately run for high ground or seek the upper floors of nearby buildings.

In 2004, ten-year-old Tilly Smith of Surrey, England, was on Maikhao beach in Phuket, Thailand with her parents and sister, and having learned about tsunamis recently in school, told her family that a tsunami might be imminent. Her parents warned others minutes before the wave arrived, saving dozens of lives. She credited her geography teacher, Andrew Kearney.

In the 2004 Indian Ocean tsunami drawback was not reported on the African coast or any other east-facing coasts that it reached. This was because the initial wave moved downwards on the eastern side of the megathrust and upwards on the western side. The western pulse hit coastal Africa and other western areas.

A tsunami cannot be precisely predicted, even if the magnitude and location of an earthquake is known. Geologists, oceanographers, and seismologists analyse each earthquake and based on many factors may or may not issue a tsunami warning. However, there are some warning signs of an impending tsunami, and automated systems can provide warnings immediately after an earthquake in time to save lives. One of the most successful systems uses bottom pressure sensors, attached to buoys, which constantly monitor the pressure of the overlying water column.

Regions with a high tsunami risk typically use tsunami warning systems to warn the population before the wave reaches land. On the west coast of the United States, which is prone to tsunamis from the Pacific Ocean, warning signs indicate evacuation routes. In Japan, the populace is well-educated about earthquakes and tsunamis, and along Japanese shorelines, tsunami warning signs remind people of the natural hazards along with a network of warning sirens, typically at the top of the cliffs of surrounding hills.

The Pacific Tsunami Warning System is based in Honolulu, Hawaiʻi. It monitors Pacific Ocean seismic activity. A sufficiently large earthquake magnitude and other information triggers a tsunami warning. While the subduction zones around the Pacific are seismically active, not all earthquakes generate a tsunami. Computers assist in analysing the tsunami risk of every earthquake that occurs in the Pacific Ocean and the adjoining land masses.

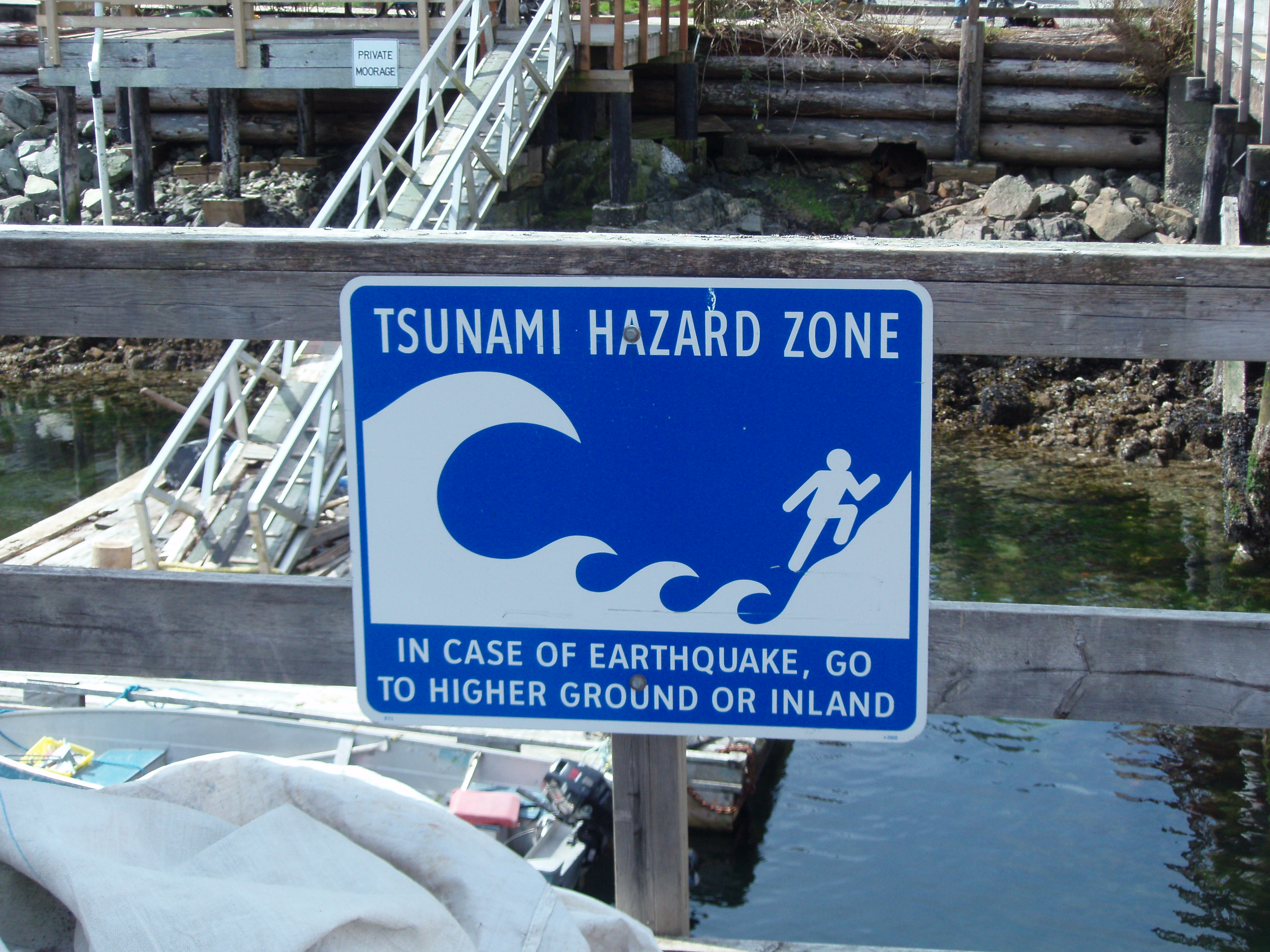
Tsunami hazard sign at Bamfield, British Columbia

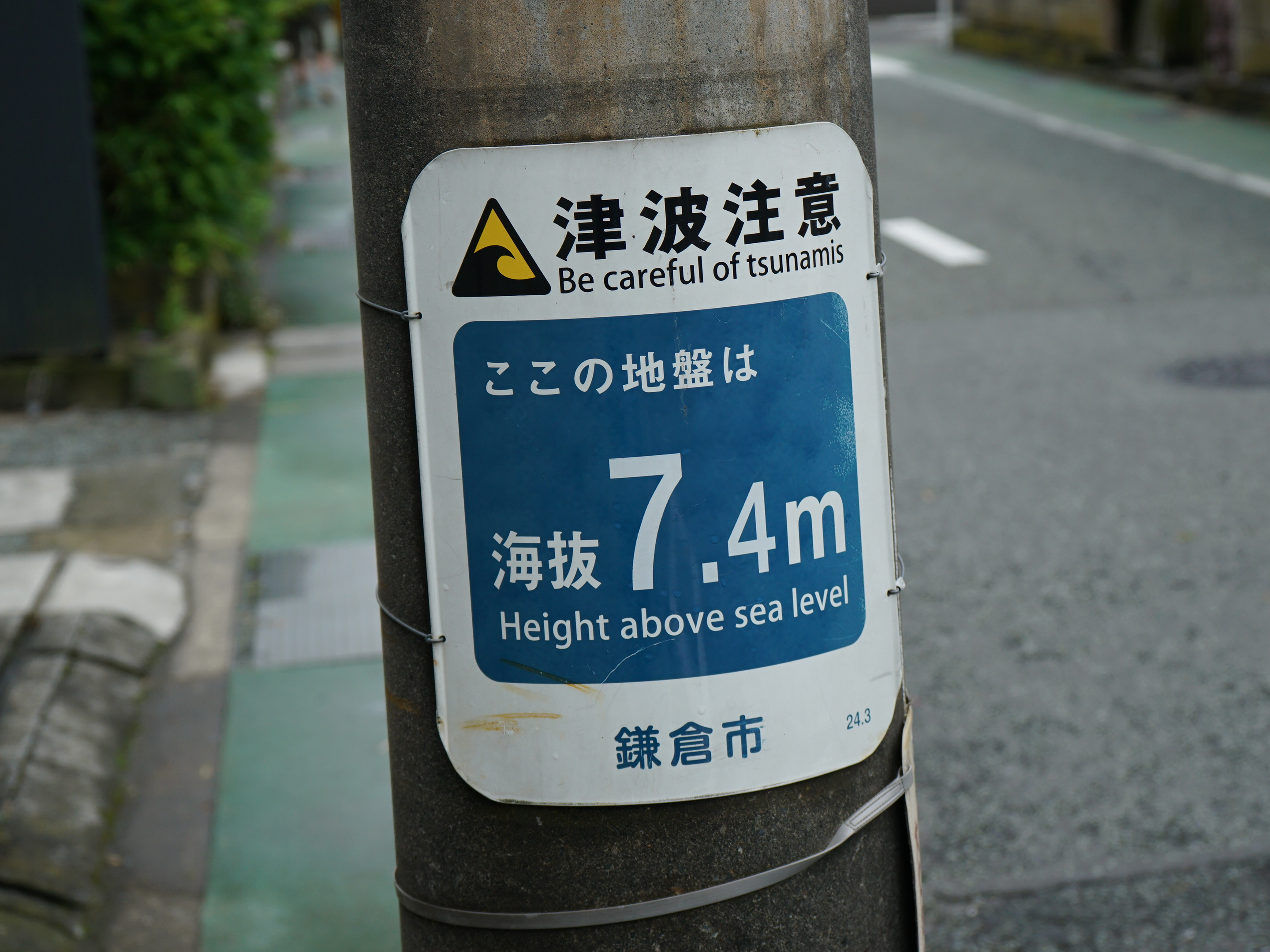
A tsunami warning sign in Kamakura, Japan

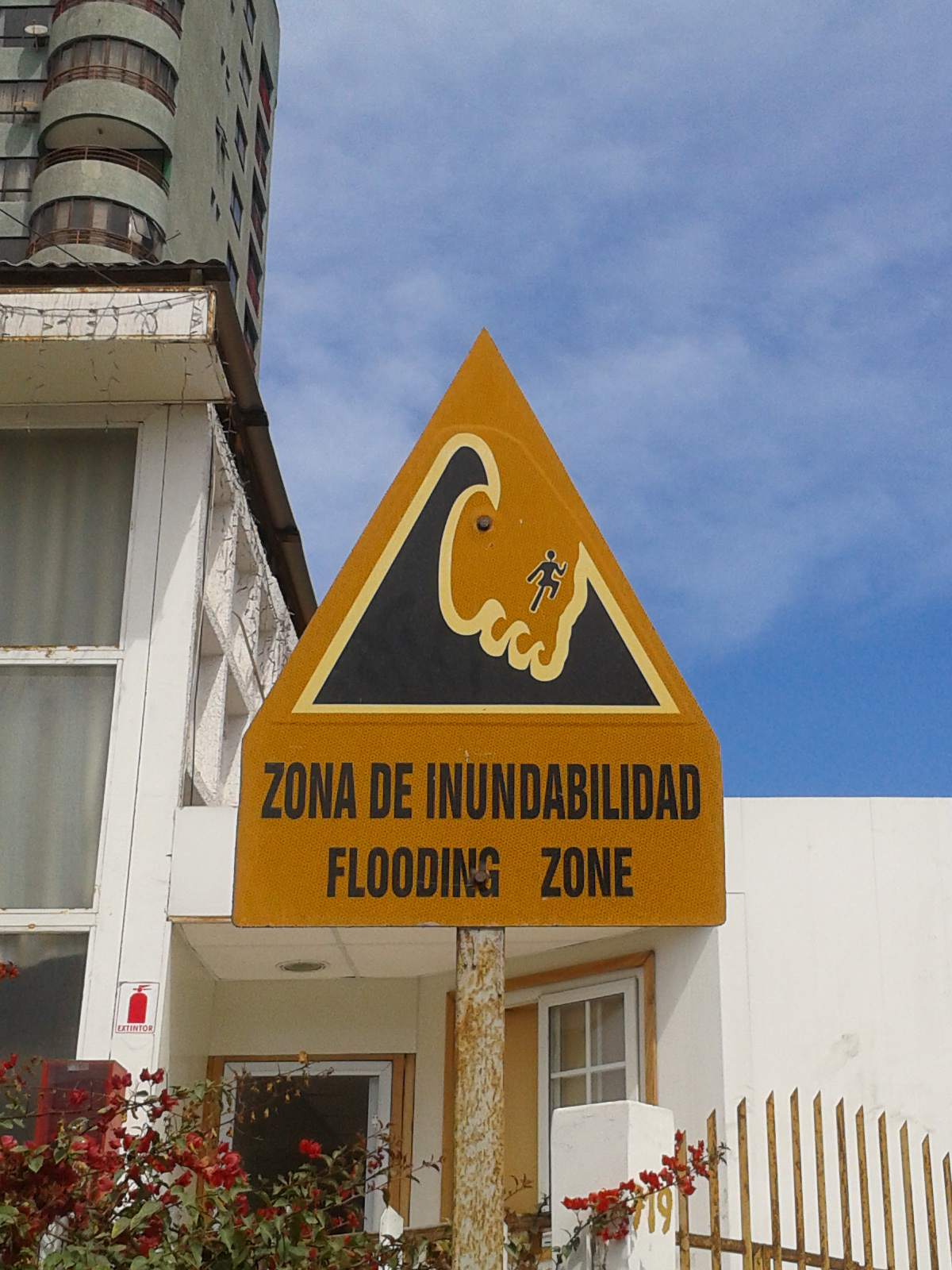
A Tsunami hazard sign (Spanish – English) in Iquique, Chile

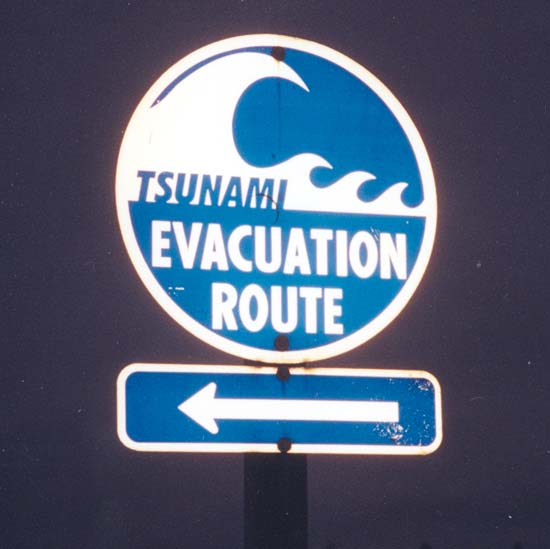
Tsunami Evacuation Route signage along U.S. Route 101, in Washington

As a direct result of the Indian Ocean tsunami, a re-appraisal of the tsunami threat for all coastal areas is being undertaken by national governments and the United Nations Disaster Mitigation Committee. A tsunami warning system is being installed in the Indian Ocean.

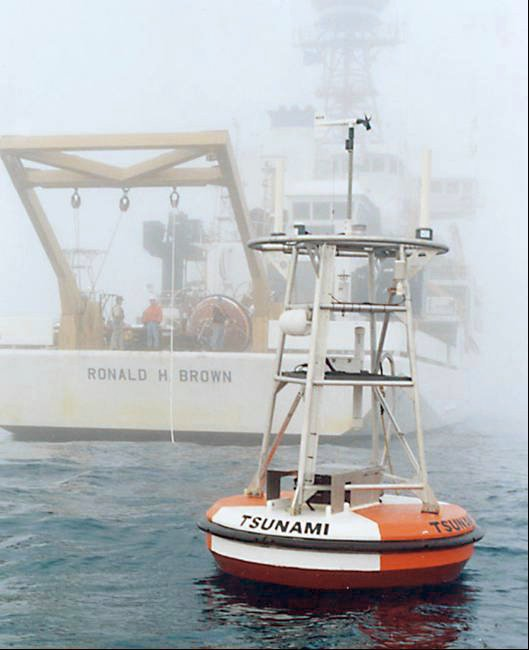
One of the deep water buoys used in the DART tsunami warning system

Computer models can predict tsunami arrival, usually within minutes of the arrival time. Bottom pressure sensors can relay information in real time. Based on these pressure readings and other seismic information and the seafloor's shape (bathymetry) and coastal topography, the models estimate the amplitude and surge height of the approaching tsunami. All Pacific Rim countries collaborate in the Tsunami Warning System and most regularly practise evacuation and other procedures. In Japan, such preparation is mandatory for government, local authorities, emergency services and the population.

Along the United States west coast, in addition to sirens, warnings are sent on television and radio via the National Weather Service, using the Emergency Alert System.

=== Possible animal reaction ===
Some zoologists hypothesise that some animal species have an ability to sense subsonic Rayleigh waves from an earthquake or a tsunami. If correct, monitoring their behaviour could provide advance warning of earthquakes and tsunamis. However, the evidence is controversial and is not widely accepted. There are unsubstantiated claims about the Lisbon quake that some animals escaped to higher ground, while many other animals in the same areas drowned. The phenomenon was also noted by media sources in Sri Lanka in the 2004 Indian Ocean earthquake. It is possible that certain animals (e.g., elephants) may have heard the sounds of the tsunami as it approached the coast. The elephants' reaction was to move away from the approaching noise. By contrast, some humans went to the shore to investigate and many drowned as a result.

== Mitigation ==
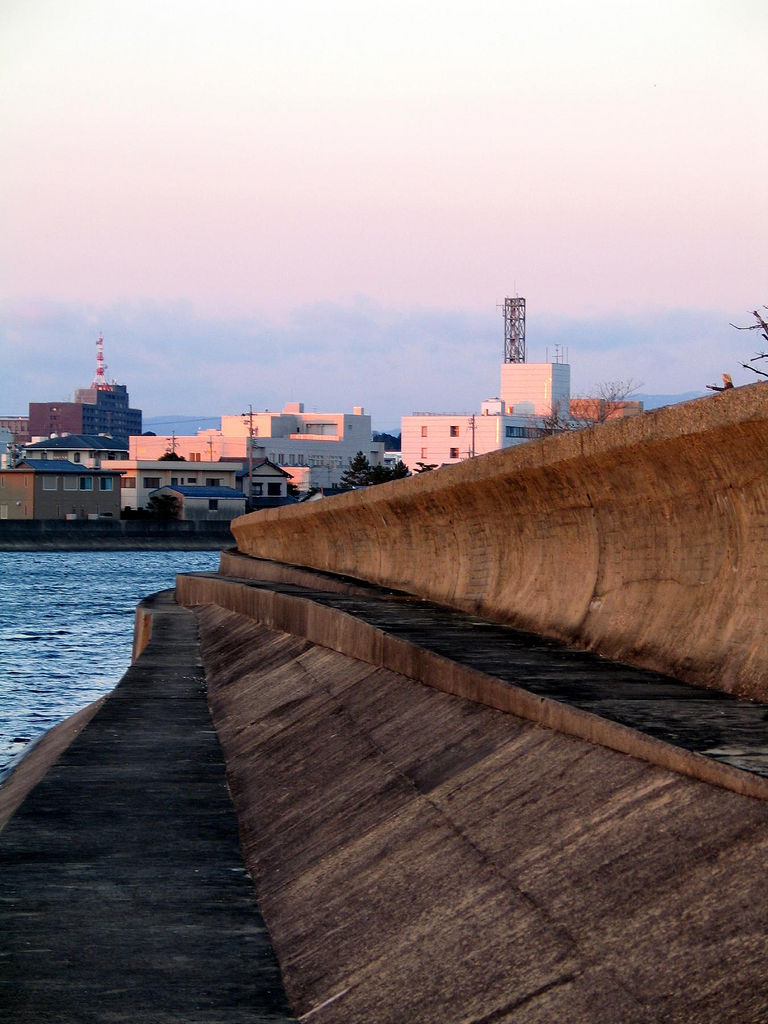
A seawall at Tsu, Mie Prefecture in Japan

In some tsunami-prone countries, earthquake engineering measures have been taken to reduce the damage caused onshore.

Japan, where tsunami science and response measures first began following a disaster in 1896, has produced ever-more elaborate countermeasures and response plans. The country has built many tsunami walls of up to 12 metres (39 ft) high to protect populated coastal areas. Other localities have built floodgates of up to 15.5 metres (51 ft) high and channels to redirect the water from an incoming tsunami. However, their effectiveness has been questioned, as tsunamis often overtop the barriers.

The Fukushima Daiichi nuclear disaster was directly triggered by the 2011 Tōhoku earthquake and tsunami, when waves exceeded the height of the plant's sea wall and flooded the emergency generators. Iwate Prefecture, which is an area at high risk from tsunami, had tsunami barriers walls (Taro sea wall) totalling 25 kilometres (16 mi) long at coastal towns. The 2011 tsunami toppled more than 50% of the walls and caused catastrophic damage.

The Okushiri, Hokkaidō tsunami, which struck within two to five minutes of the earthquake on July 12, 1993, created waves 30 metres (100 ft) tall—as high as a 10-storey building. The port town of Aonae was completely surrounded by a tsunami wall, but the waves washed right over the wall and destroyed all the wood-framed structures in the area. The wall may have succeeded in slowing down and moderating the height of the tsunami, but it did not prevent major destruction and loss of life.

== See also ==
- Emergency management – Dealing with all humanitarian aspects of emergencies
- Higher Ground Project
- Index of wave articles
- Kaikōura Canyon landslide tsunami hazard – Peninsula in New Zealand
- List of tsunamis
- List of natural disasters by death toll
- Lists of earthquakes
- List of tsunamis affecting New Zealand
- Minoan eruption – Major volcanic eruption around 1600 BC
- Rogue wave – Unexpectedly large transient ocean surface wave
- Seiche – Standing wave in an enclosed or partially enclosed body of water
- Sneaker wave – Disproportionately large coastal wave
- Supervolcano – Volcano that has erupted with a volcanic explosivity index of 8
- Tauredunum event – Ancient Tsunami on Lake Geneva
- Tsunami deposit – Sedimentary unit deposited by a tsunami
- Tsunami-proof building – Building designed to withstand extreme floods
- Tsunami warning system – System used to detect and warn the public about impending tsunamis
