= MythBusters (2006 season) =

- No. of episodes: 28 (includes 2 specials)

Release
- Original network: Discovery Channel
- Original release: January 11 – December 13, 2006

Season chronology
- ← Previous; 2005 season Next → 2007 season

The cast of the television series MythBusters perform experiments to verify or debunk urban legends, old wives' tales, and the like. This is a list of the various myths tested on the show, as well as the results of the experiments (the myth is busted, plausible, or confirmed).

== Episode overview ==
No. overall	No. in season	Title	Original release date	Overall episode No.
44	1	"Paper Crossbow"	January 11, 2006	55
Myths tested: Can a deadly crossbow be made from materials available to prison inmates? Can vodka remove the smell of cigarettes from clothes, kill bees like an insecticide, or be used as a bathroom cleaner?
45	2	"Shredded Plane"	January 18, 2006	56
Myths tested: What caused a plane to be shredded? Can a fire be started by rubbing sticks together, with a bullet, or with ice?
46	3	"Archimedes Death Ray"	January 25, 2006	57
Myths tested: Can an array of bronze mirrors set a wooden ship on fire? (Revisit of: Ancient Death Ray); Note: This is the first appearance of "Mythtern" Jess Nelson.
47	4	"Helium Football"	February 1, 2006	58
Myths tested: Can a football fly farther if it is filled with helium? Is it possible for a human to catch a bullet in his teeth?
48	5	"Franklin's Kite"	March 8, 2006	59
Myths tested: Could a kite struck by lightning in a storm kill the person holding it? Are various flatulence myths true?
49	6	"Cell Phones on Planes"	March 15, 2006	60
Myths tested: Can a cell phone cause a plane to crash? Can a person fly away on a raft filled with helium?
50	7	"Bullets Fired Up"	April 19, 2006	61
Myths tested: Can a bullet fired straight up in the air kill someone on the way back down? Can vodka cure poison oak and remove band-aids painlessly? If low-end vodka is charcoal-filtered, will it become a top-shelf vodka?
51	8	"Myths Re-Opened"	April 26, 2006	62
Myths tested: Is it possible to split an arrow by hitting it with another? (Revisit of: Splitting an Arrow); Can a hybrid rocket be propelled with salami? Can a modern firearm be fired if completely submerged in water?
52	9	"Mind Control"	May 3, 2006	63
Myths tested: Can mind control be achieved by various techniques? Can a room be painted with dynamite?
53	10	"Exploding Pants"	May 10, 2006	64
Myths tested: Is it possible for pants to spontaneously explode? Do various fuel efficiency methods work?
54	11	"Crimes and Myth-Demeanors 1"	July 12, 2006	65
Myths tested: Can a laser alarm be defeated? Can a metal duct be stealthily climbed using magnets? Can a pressure switch be defeated? How easy is it to crack a safe? Can a hole be easily cut into a pane of glass without setting off a sound alarm?
55	12	"Steam Cannon"	July 19, 2006	66
Myths tested: Did Archimedes make a cannon using steam power? Is a cardboard cereal box more nutritious than the sugary cereal inside?
56	13	"Whirlpool/Snowplow"	July 26, 2006	67
Myths tested: Can a whirlpool really kill somebody? Can a snowplow driving down the road push enough air to flip a passing car over?
57	14	"Mentos and Soda"	August 9, 2006	68
Myths tested: Why does dropping Mentos into a bottle of Diet Coke create a geyser effect? Can a stamp affixed to a helicopter's rotor blade make it crash?
58	15	"Shattering Subwoofer"	August 16, 2006	69
Myths tested: Can speaker power alone destroy a car? Will driving faster on a bumpy road smooth out the ride?
59	16	"Crimes and Myth-Demeanors 2"	August 23, 2006	70
Myths tested: Can fingerprint scanners, sonar, or thermal alarms be foiled? Can a glass re-locking safe be blown up by filling it with water?
60	17	"Earthquake Machine"	August 30, 2006	71
Myths tested: Can a machine designed by Nikola Tesla actually create a miniature earthquake or collapse a structure? Can a lava lamp explode if heated on the stove?
61	18	"Deadly Straw"	September 6, 2006	72
Myths tested: Can a hurricane blow a piece of straw through a tree? According to Primary Perception, do all living things share an interconnected consciousness?
SP9	Special–1	"Mega Movie Myths"	September 13, 2006	73
Myths tested: Can shooting locks really open a door? Can a car be fitted with an ejection seat? Can a car drive up a ramp, fly through the air, land, and drive away? Can a person shoot a hole through a floor and fall through? Will awnings help break a fall from a building? Can a sword cut another sword in half? Note: This is a special double-length episode.
62	19	"Killer Cable Snaps"	October 11, 2006	74
Myths tested: If a steel cable under high tension snaps, could it cut a human in half? Can sounds and vibrations be recorded into the grooves of ancient pottery?
63	20	"Air Cylinder Rocket"	October 18, 2006	75
Myths tested: Can an air cylinder go straight through a cinder-block wall or propel a boat? Can an engine run on gunpowder alone?
64	21	"More Myths Revisited"	October 25, 2006	76
Myths tested: Can a hybrid rocket be propelled with salami? (Revisit of: Salami Rocket); Is it more efficient to drive a truck with its tailgate up than down? (Revisit of: Tailgate Up vs. Tailgate Down); Can a sword slice a machine gun barrel? Can bracing a windshield keep it from shattering? Does a plastic mesh tailgate provide superior fuel efficiency compared to the standard metal tailgate?
65	22	"Exploding Lighter"	November 1, 2006	77
Myths tested: Can a disposable lighter explode with lethal force? Are various gunslinger myths true?
66	23	"Concrete Glider"	November 8, 2006	78
Myths tested: Can a working glider be made out of concrete? Can a passing train suck a person onto the tracks?
67	24	"Firearms Folklore"	November 29, 2006	79
Myths tested: Can a bullet travel through a sniper's scope and kill him? Can a fired bullet lodge in the chamber of a revolver? Can two colliding bullets fuse in mid air? If two metal hammers are struck together, will they explode?
68	25	"Anti-Gravity Device"	December 6, 2006	80
Myths tested: Is anti-gravity possible? Can too many lights on a Christmas tree cause it to light on fire? Can vodka help to ease the pain of a jellyfish sting?
SP10	Special–2	"Holiday Special"	December 6, 2006	81
Myths tested: Can a falling frozen turkey break a person's foot or kill a pet? Can a turkey be cooked by exposing it to a radar or microwave transmitter antenna? Do various methods work keeping the needles of a Christmas tree from falling off? Can a holiday-themed Rube Goldberg machine be built within a week's time? Note: This is a special episode. This is the first episode to air the new opening sequence and to film in high definition.
69	26	"22,000-Foot Fall"	December 13, 2006	82
Myths tested: Is it possible to survive a 22,000-foot fall using the blast from a 1000-pound bomb to break the fall? Is electricity saved by switching off the lights when leaving a room?

== Episode 44 – "Paper Crossbow" ==
- Original air date: January 11, 2006

=== Paper Crossbow ===
This myth was the first entry among those listed as one of the twelve myths that would not be tested in MythBusters: The Explosive Truth Behind 30 of the Most Perplexing Urban Legends of All Time. In an interview for Skeptic magazine, the myth apparently was considered too controversial by Discovery Channel, which thought testing the myth could provoke prisoners to try similar things.

Myth statement	Status	Notes
A prison inmate can kill another inmate from across the hall by using newspaper for a paper crossbow.	Plausible	Jamie and Adam built separate crossbows for the myth and fired a few shots each. Testing proved it is possible to kill someone by using a paper crossbow, but it would require a precise shot to a vital spot (such as a jugular vein or eye), which is difficult with improvised weapons such as a paper crossbow. Adam's crossbow achieved a maximum arrow velocity of 91 ft/s (28 m/s), a maximum arrow energy of 7.45 ft⋅lbf (10.10 J), and pierced a dummy's throat one inch (25 mm) deep from a distance of 15 ft (4.6 m) on the first shot. The crossbows each gradually became useless after a few shots, showing that the shooter would have only a few shots to hit a vital spot. Also, the obvious problem of getting off one shot or more without being caught in the act exists. A visit to a local prison revealed inmates have improvised far more effective weapons in the past, up to and including a handmade gun with a flash suppressor, firing bullets smuggled into the prison.

=== Vodka Myths II ===
Kari, Tory, and Grant tested to see if vodka...

Myth statement	Status	Notes
...can remove cigarette smoke smell from clothes.	Plausible	The difference was noticeable between the control jacket and the one sprayed with vodka before washing. Grant described the control jacket as having an "oaky smell" to it, while on the vodka jacket, he could not detect such a smell.
...can kill bees like an insecticide.	Busted	The control water killed more bees (two) than vodka, which failed to kill any. The bees sprayed with water went into a comatose-like state and awoke later the next day when they dried off. The bees sprayed with vodka showed no ill effects at all (though they seemed to fly in a weird manner as if they were drunk).
...can be used as a bathroom cleaner.	Plausible	Vodka proved to be less effective than a commercial bathroom cleaner but still serviceable.

== Episode 45 – "Shredded Plane" ==
- Original air date: January 18, 2006

=== Shredded Plane ===
One widely circulated photo showed a systematically and neatly sliced Piper PA-44 Seminole. The damage was caused by...

Myth statement	Status	Notes
...a chainsaw.	Busted	The slices made by the chainsaw were jagged, while the ones seen in the photo were clean slices. In addition, the chainsaw left damaged paint in the areas it initially sliced into as a result of the blade sliding across the surface before cutting in, which is not seen in the photo.
...a runaway taxiing plane's propeller.	Confirmed	Adam and Jamie first investigated whether or not it is possible to hand start a modern airplane, and why a pilot may need to do so. They then calculated that a plane, with engine running at idle speed, would need to travel at 30 miles per hour in order to make cuts at the distances seen in the photo, which they deemed as a reasonable speed for a plane running at idle speed to be traveling at. The full-scale test was done with a runaway engine and stand-in tail section, producing a result that was almost identical to the shredded plane seen in the photo. The incident was later confirmed as having taken place, with the photo coming from a newspaper article in Australia. Furthermore, the accident, which happened in August 2001 at Parafield Airport near Adelaide, occurred after a pilot tried to hand-start a Saratoga after its electrical system went flat, inadvertently sending the plane running amok and crashing into five other planes, including the Seminole in the myth's photograph. This supported what Adam and Jamie had learned during the course of testing the myth; modern airplanes do sometimes need to be hand-started should the battery go flat and can run away if nobody is controlling it.

=== Fire Without Matches ===
Fire can be started...

Myth statement	Status	Notes
...using the friction caused by rubbing two sticks together.	Confirmed	While the Build Team—in their own words—cheated and used a drill and some gunpowder, with a stick in place of a drillbit, the friction from the drill did light the tinder on fire. This myth was tested legitimately in the 2012 season's "Duct Tape Island" with a bamboo bow drill and duct tape string.
...using a bullet.	Confirmed	Earlier tests using modern weaponry (and smokeless powder) were unproductive. Tory then modified an old musket and replaced the bullet with a piece of cloth. When the gun was fired, the black powder ignited the cloth, which then ignited the tinder into which it was shot.
...using a soda can bottom polished with chocolate.	Confirmed	Chocolate was used to buff out the wear marks and ink marking and give the can bottom a reflective shine that could focus light and produce heat. While the can was not able to light tinder that was held by hand, the rig easily lit when the tinder was secured on a makeshift rig that kept it from moving.
...using steel wool and the ends of a battery.	Confirmed	It took several tries, but the ends of the battery eventually heated the steel wool (through electric resistance) enough to light it on fire. A clip from a survivalist TV show with Ron Hood also showed this myth to be confirmed. This is also a requirement for the American Boy Scout Wilderness Survival merit badge.
...using ice.	Confirmed	Kari used a globe of specially produced clear ice about half the size of a bowling ball to produce smoke and later fire when she used it as a refractive lens.

== Episode 46 – "Archimedes Death Ray" ==
- Original air date: January 25, 2006

This was the third episode where myths from previous episodes were revisited, as well as the third episode to focus on just one experiment.

This episode, referred to as the "MythBusters Mailbag Special: The Great Archimedes Burn-Off" from within the episode itself, saw a retest of the Ancient Death Ray myth after fans of the series contested the MythBusters' original decision. To this end, the MythBusters commissioned a contest, challenging viewers to prove the myth plausible.

Candidates could enter in either of two categories: a smaller-scale version where the object was to ignite an object from 5 ft (1.5 m) away, or the full-scale version, where the object was to ignite a replica trireme from 100 ft (30 m) away (as per the original myth). For the smaller-scale version, two finalists—the team of Kari Lukes and Jess Nelson, both from UCSB, and the team of Brenden Millstein (Harvard) and Stephen Marsh (Lawrence Berkeley National Laboratory)—were chosen to compete against the MythBusters' own entry in the retest (which was disqualified when it was found that the MythBusters had not followed the contest rules they had set out themselves). Only one entrant (Mike Bushroe, a NASA space scientist) entered a full-scale contest; however, the winning entry was destroyed en route for the retest.

The MythBusters also invited a team from MIT, led by Professor David Wallace, who had independently verified that a ship could be lit from afar using an array of mirrors, to retest the myth with Archimedean-era technology instead of the modern technology used in their own experiment.

Myth statement	Status	Notes
An array of bronze mirrors can set a wooden ship on fire. (From Ancient Death Ray)	Re-busted	The large-scale array simply took too long to light the ship on fire. In addition, the ship ignited only when it was stationary and positioned at less than half the distance described in the myth. The myth was plausible at a smaller scale, however. Flaming arrows were fired from a ballista at the ship but to little effect. The most effective (and plausible with Archimedes-era technology) method of lighting the ship ablaze was through the use of Molotov cocktails.

While it was shown extensively that it is, in fact, plausible that an array of mirrors (or a parabolic mirror) could set objects on fire, the MythBusters stood by their original "busted" verdict because of many factors:

- Syracuse, where the myth was supposed to take place, faced east, thus it could not take advantage of the more intense midday rays, instead relying on less powerful morning rays.
- The death ray would not work during cloudy weather.
- Enemy ships were likely to be moving targets, thus the mirrors would need to be constantly refocused.
- The historical records: No mention of the use of fire during the Battle of Syracuse was made until 300 years after the event, and no mention of mirrors was made until 800 years after the event.
- The impossibly large numbers of mirrors and personnel needed to light a boat with any reasonable speed.
- The availability of other weapons that were much more effective: Flaming arrows and Molotov cocktail were more reliable at setting an enemy ship ablaze, and they were more effective over longer distances.

The MythBusters also addressed fans' criticisms that suggested they try to light the ships' sails instead of the body of the ship, and showed the sails diffused the light due to their composition and the wind blowing against them, thus they could not be as easily set on fire compared to the body of the ship.

The myth would be visited a third time in 2010 in the President's Challenge, only to be re-busted.

== Episode 47 – "Helium Football" ==
- Original air date: February 1, 2006

=== Helium Football ===
Adam and Jamie took on a myth prevalent around football circles, made more prevalent during the time of prolific punter Ray Guy, whose kicks carried so much distance and had so much hangtime, some had suspected the footballs he used were filled with helium.

Myth statement	Status	Notes
A regulation NFL football will fly farther when filled with helium as opposed to compressed air at regulation pressure (13 psi or 90 kPa).	Busted	Under the same amount of impulse under the same atmospheric conditions, balls filled with helium showed no significant difference from balls filled with compressed air. Under the same impulse, both types of balls had the same initial velocity; since the helium-filled balls have a lower mass than the air-filled ones, the helium-filled balls have less inertia in flight. In fact, they may perform worse than air-filled balls over larger distances.

=== Catching a Bullet in Your Teeth ===
The Build Team takes on the bullet catch magic trick and sees whether it is possible to do the trick for real.

Myth statement	Status	Notes
It is possible to catch a fired bullet in one piece with one's teeth.	Busted	A pig's teeth are significantly stronger than a human's, and yet they were shattered by an impulse test when a bullet, held by a pig head's teeth under the same pressure as an average human's maximum bite strength, was suddenly forced forward by a force equivalent to a speeding bullet. Furthermore, the reaction time needed to perfectly capture a bullet in one's teeth is too short and has too tight a tolerance for any human to succeed. Finally, when the bullet was captured perfectly, the velocity at which it traveled completely destroyed even a full metal jacket bullet. It is impossible to catch a bullet in the same state as it exited a gun, by solid mechanical means.

== Episode 48 – "Franklin's Kite" ==
- Original air date: March 8, 2006

=== Franklin's Kite ===
The Build Team took on a piece of American folklore regarding Benjamin Franklin's discovery of lightning as electricity. The folklore description is not historically accurate (as mentioned by the Build Team), although it is a popular misconception.

Myth statement	Status	Notes
When Benjamin Franklin showed lightning to be electricity by flying a kite during a thunderstorm, could he have survived the shock?	Busted and confirmed	The experiment itself worked perfectly as described, but the current produced by artificial lightning (which is a fraction of what a real lightning bolt would contain) was fatal. Based on this observation, the Build Team concluded Franklin could not possibly have survived a direct hit as the popular story of the experiment states. They also found the kite need not be directly struck by lightning for the experiment to work. Experiment: confirmed; story: busted.

=== Facts About Flatulence ===
In this myth, Adam and Jamie tested some of the more prevalent myths based on flatulence. Throughout the myth, the MythBusters were careful to use only the scientific term "flatus" as opposed to the more common "fart", to prevent coming off as insensitive to the viewers (although "fart" had been used and aired uncensored by the MythBusters before and since).

Myth statement	Status	Notes
Flatulence can be induced by consuming beans.	Confirmed	While Adam consumed a diet of beans for one day, his rate of flatulence doubled.
Flatulence can be induced by consuming carbonated soft drinks.	Confirmed	While Kari consumed only carbonated drinks for one day, her rate of flatulence doubled.
Flatulence can be induced by consuming beef.	Busted	Jamie's rate of flatulence did not change after he consumed a diet of beef for one day.
It is possible to flatulate so much, one can suffocate from the gas expelled.	Busted	The amount of potentially deadly gases found in an average flatus, such as carbon dioxide, is too low to cause its concentration to rise to fatal levels in a few hours, even in a small airtight room. In fact, breathing causes the CO_{2} levels to rise much faster.
Lighting a match will burn the odorous gases in a flatus.	Busted	Lighting a match does not reduce the concentration of hydrogen sulfide and methyl mercaptan, the odorous gases commonly found in flatulence. The smell of a safety match being ignited instead masks the smell of methyl mercaptan when tested individually.

Two additional myths were filmed but not aired as part of the broadcast episode. These have been shown in an outtakes reel at live appearances by the MythBusters.

==== Do Girls Pass Gas? ====
Myth statement	Status	Notes
Pretty girls do not pass gas.	Busted	Wearing special undergarments fitted with a microphone and patched through a sound system and given a hydrogen sulfide meter, Kari was given the lead in this myth. Despite the meter malfunctioning and many hours without any sound broadcast over the speakers, Kari finally produced a flatus and busted the myth. This myth was later shown as part of the MythBusters Mailbag special, aired on May 20, 2012. It was cited as Kari's most embarrassing moment on the show.

==== Lighting the Emission ====
This is also referred to as "Flatus Burning."

Myth statement	status	notes
It is possible to ignite a flatus.	Confirmed	The chair used in the myth Lighting the Emission Adam began by welding attachments to an ordinary chair to allow him an optimal position. Adam waited patiently for a flatus to surface. Using a standard lighter, the high-speed camera showed the flatus did indeed combust, confirming the myth. This myth was later shown as part of the MythBusters Top 25 Moments special, aired on June 16, 2010.

== Episode 49 – "Cell Phones on Planes" ==
- Original air date: March 15, 2006

=== Helium Raft ===
Myth statement	Status	Notes
A person can fly using a life raft filled with helium.	Busted	The amount of helium required to lift a person off the ground (or even the raft itself) is prohibitively immense, and such a raft of adequate size would be quite flimsy. In fact, the final test of the raft had to be aborted because of an unbalanced release of the ties, causing Adam to become entangled and destroying the raft in the process.

=== Cell Phones on a Plane ===
Myth statement	Status	Notes
The ban on cell phones on aircraft is designed to force passengers to use the expensive in-flight phones.	Busted	Cell-phone signals, specifically those in the 800–900 MHz range, did interfere with unshielded cockpit instrumentation. Because older aircraft with unshielded wiring can be affected, because of the possible problems that may arise by having many airborne cell phones "seeing" multiple cell phone towers, and because of all the electronic systems in a modern airplane that would have to undergo lengthy and expensive certification, the MythBusters speculated that the FCC (by enforcement through the FAA) prohibits the use of cell phones while airborne to remain on the safe side, rather than the air companies asking for the ban to increase their revenue from in-flight phones. Such a prohibition was lifted in Europe.

== Episode 50 – "Bullets Fired Up" ==
- Original air date: April 19, 2006

=== Bullets Fired Up ===
Myth statement	Status	Notes
Bullets fired into the air maintain their lethal capability when they eventually fall back down.	Busted, plausible, and confirmed	In the case of a bullet fired at sufficiently close to a vertical angle to result in a nonballistic trajectory, the bullet would tumble, lose its spin, and fall at a much slower speed due to terminal velocity, so it is rendered less than lethal on impact (the "busted" rating). However, if a bullet is fired at a lower angle allowing for a ballistic trajectory (a far more likely case), it will maintain its spin and will retain enough energy to be lethal on impact (the "plausible" rating). Because of this potentiality, firing a gun into the air is illegal in most U.S. states, and even in the states where it is legal, it is not recommended by the police. Also, the MythBusters were able to identify two people who had been injured by falling bullets (fired from about 1 mi (1.6 km) away, hence at a lower angle), one of them fatally (the "confirmed" rating). This is the only myth to receive all three ratings at the same time.

=== Vodka Myths III ===
Vodka can...

Myth statement	status	Notes
...remove poison oak.	Busted	For some reason, although most of the MythBusters were allergic to poison oak when they were young (especially Kari, who was exempted from the test because she had once had a dangerous reaction), it did not affect anyone but John the Researcher. The vodka still gave no results.
...painlessly remove plastic bandages.	Plausible	Both a control bandage and a vodka-soaked bandage were quickly removed from hair-covered legs, and while not painless, the vodka-soaked bandage came off less painfully and removed less hair than the control.
...be used as an improvised ice pack when mixed with water in a sealed plastic bag. (This myth was not seen in the version aired in the US.)	Confirmed	After the mixture was put inside the refrigerator overnight, the vodka (which has a lower freezing point than water) prevented the water from freezing, making the mixture cold and malleable. When tested against a commercial ice pack for twenty minutes, the mixture worked just as well, although the commercial ice pack was slightly better by about half a degree Celsius or one degree Fahrenheit (about 18.3 °F or −7.6 °C for the commercial ice pack against 19.4 °F or −7.0 °C in the vodka/water mixture). Tory even joked after the test that the mixture could make a good slushie to drink after use.
...be turned into high-quality vodka through charcoal filtration.	Busted	Through a double-blind taste test, the cheap vodka seemed to taste better with every subsequent filtration, although the top-shelf vodka beat them all. However, a chemical analysis showed no actual difference between the filtered and unfiltered cheap vodka.

== Episode 51 – "Myths Re-Opened" ==
- Original air date: April 26, 2006

This was the fourth episode in which myths were retested (counting the Archimedes Death Ray revisit).

=== Salami Rocket ===
The MythBusters revisited the Confederate Rocket myth with some new information from viewers. This was revisited in "More Myths Revisited".

Myth statement	Status	Notes
A hybrid rocket can be propelled with salami. (From Confederate Rocket)	Confirmed	Salami, like the paraffin used in the first test, was able to propel the rocket, although it tended to explode instead of providing even thrust.

=== Splitting an Arrow ===
At the insistence of viewers, the team retested the popular arrow-splitting myth seen in the film The Adventures of Robin Hood.

Myth statement	Status	Notes
An arrow can be split in half through a direct hit in the tail by another arrow. (From Splitting an Arrow)	Re-busted	Even after multiple direct hits on a solid wood arrow with the bone nock removed with a professional archer, a tail-to-tip split could not be achieved. It took an arrow made of hollow bamboo to create the splitting effect seen in the movie, because the second arrow will follow the grain of the first, normal arrow, which will lead to the side before it makes it to the end. Also, their tests revealed that an arrow fired from a traditional bow wobbles in the air, enough that it will not hit the end of the arrow straight.

=== Guns Fired Underwater ===
It has already been shown that, in some cases, bullets become non-lethal when fired into water, but what happens when the whole gun is fired under water?

Myth statement	Status	Notes
A modern firearm can be fired if completely submerged in water. (From Bulletproof Water)	Confirmed	All of the firearms (a 9mm, a .357, a 12-gauge shotgun, and a .30-06) could be discharged under water, but the bullets lose velocity rapidly and are rendered less than lethal beyond a meter. (The entire gun had to be completely submerged in water—all pockets of air must be removed—to prevent a possible explosion when fired.) Furthermore, the break-barrel shotgun (a relatively old design) destroyed itself when fired under water. Finally, the water pressure might cause the spent cartridge casing to fail to leave the chamber and effectively reduce the gun to a one-shot deal. Obviously, revolvers would not have this problem, as they do not eject their spent casings after each shot.

== Episode 52 – "Mind Control" ==
- Original air date: May 3, 2006

=== Painting With Explosives ===
This myth originated from the episode "Do-It-Yourself, Mr. Bean" of the British comedy series Mr. Bean starring Rowan Atkinson.

Myth statement	Status	Notes
A small room can be quickly painted by detonating a stick of dynamite in a bucket of paint.	Busted	A stick of dynamite in a bucket of paint cannot distribute the paint evenly enough to fully paint the room; only 40% of the room (around the bottom and part of the ceiling) received paint, and the room took some shrapnel damage (even from a plastic bucket). Furthermore, Adam's and Jamie's customized contraptions, designed to help distribute the paint more evenly, failed to produce any successful results or an intact room.

=== Mind Control ===
Remote, non-consensual mind control can be achieved by...

Myth statement	status	Notes
...a psionic helmet kit, ordered off the internet.	Busted	The test failed to produce any effects. Tory wore the helmet for two tests. The first was an attempt at a local coffee shop to give his order to the clerk without telling her, which failed (although the women behind him claimed to receive the message he was trying to broadcast). In the second attempt, he attempted to make Jamie remove his trademark beret, with no effect, while Jamie was filming the wrap-up for Facts About Flatulence. (Tory, in fact, is visible in the rear of the shot during that episode, wearing the helmet.)
...pulsed air.	Busted	The test failed to produce any effects.
...a spinning magnet.	Plausible	While it is plausible that some sort of "mind influence" (determined by looking at EEG recordings) was achieved, no actual predictable control of the mind's state occurred. Also, the magnet may have affected the EEG machine's readings.
...subliminal sound.	Busted	The test failed to produce any effects.
...remote hypnosis.	Partly plausible	Enough pre-existing scientific evidence exists regarding hypnosis for the Build Team to call the myth plausible, and their EEG readings backed up that evidence. However, a later myth busts the possibility that one could coerce another person into doing something against his will through hypnosis, so while someone's brainwaves can be influenced through hypnosis, true "mind control" cannot be achieved with it.

== Episode 53 – "Exploding Pants" ==
- Original air date: May 10, 2006

=== Exploding Pants ===
This myth came from New Zealand in the early 1930s, where an epidemic of exploding pants had rampaged, injuring and even killing farmers. The culprit was a then-unfamiliar chemical substance that farmers began using in large quantities at the time.

Myth statement	Status	Notes
Under the right conditions, farm chemicals can cause a pair of trousers to combust if they are spilled on and subjected to normal wear and abuse.	Confirmed	The Build Team tried to ignite cotton denim pant swatches soaked in fertilizer, gun cotton solution, black powder, and the herbicide sodium chlorate by using an open flame, a radiant heat source, friction, and impact, but only the herbicide could ignite with sufficient energy under the above conditions (except for friction), and it was particularly reactive to impact. In a full-scale experiment using Buster, paramedics on-hand stated that Buster would most likely survive the blast with only some burns. Research confirms the herbicide as the culprit, as an accidental infestation of ragwort in the country caused a dramatic increase in herbicide use. Despite the fact that it was technically not a true explosion (as there was no rapid air compression typical of an explosion), it was agreed that the rapid flash ignition of the pants was quick and energetic enough to be deemed an "explosion" by a layman, rendering the myth confirmed. After determining this, Frank Doyle and the MythBusters painted Buster's pants with classified "Silver" explosive, and the resulting blast completely destroyed him, throwing pieces of his body in all directions.

=== The Great Gas Conspiracy ===
The "Great Gas Conspiracy" mentioned in the myth is the conspiracy theory that gasoline companies are secretly in league with the car manufacturers to produce fuel-inefficient vehicles, to fatten their profits and split the difference. The myths tested were ways found on the Internet that one can supposedly beat this conglomerate and get cheap, easy, and spectacularly improved fuel efficiency for cars. The cars were a Toyota Camry and an Oldsmobile Toronado.

Theories were tested to see if cheap fuel efficiency can be achieved with...

Myth statement	status	Notes
...carburetor magnets.	Busted	There was no change to fuel efficiency.
...acetone mixed with the gasoline.	Busted	The acetone was less fuel efficient.
..."miracle carburetor" supposed to get 300 miles per gallon.	Busted	This was far less fuel efficient.
..."water fuel cell".	Busted	The cell did not work with the car, and while the car did start unmodified when pure hydrogen was introduced, the hydrogen was also violently ignited soon afterwards, making it an unlikely, dangerous, and expensive alternative.
...used cooking oil, rather than regular fuel.	Confirmed	Although there is no word on damage to the engine from using used cooking oil, a Mercedes-Benz diesel-fueled car did run on it. However, the MythBusters speculated that once this alternative fuel achieves a significant interest level among the public, used cooking oil will be hoarded as a marketable commodity. The used cooking oil also did not quite fit the requirement of improved fuel efficiency, as it yielded approximately 10% less distance for an equivalent amount of diesel. (See biodiesel and straight vegetable oil.)

== Episode 54 – "Crimes and Myth-Demeanors 1" ==
- Original air date: July 12, 2006

The MythBusters tested the validity of some Hollywood heist scenes, using a purpose-built "assault course" with Grant operating the security system as mission controller, while two "crack teams" (Adam and Jamie, plus Tory and Kari) attempted alternate myths.

=== Air Duct Climb ===
Though present in a number of movies, the myth came primarily from the movie Firetrap, in which Max Hopper (Dean Cain) scales a duct silently using magnets. Adam and Jamie were tasked with the entry phase—scaling a 20-foot air duct stealthily. After each had devised his own system, they tested whether a person can surreptitiously scale an air duct by using a system of...

Myth statement	Status	Notes
...magnets.	Busted	Jamie's "supermagnets" (ten 500-pound (230 kg) strength ones) could hold his weight and allowed him to make it to the top of the duct, but they caused far too much noise on the way up to allow for a stealthy entrance.
...suction cups.	Busted	Adam's suction cups were able to hold his weight as well and were relatively much quieter than Jamie's magnets, but the climb was still clearly audible. Furthermore, the mechanisms Adam used to control the vacuums often failed, which caused him to slip and fall down the vent, blowing his cover. He did, however, make it to the top of the vent, once he perfected the method of operating the device in sequence to his steps up the vent. Finally, breaking through the grate of the air duct at the end was much too noisy, also blowing his cover.

=== Laser Beam Dodge ===
Before Grant started the myth, he stated that he found that the highly visible, brightly colored light beams seen in movies do not exist in the real world, as not only would it defeat the purpose of making the laser system hard to get around, but real light moves far too quickly to be seen by the naked eye, thereby making such laser systems impossible to create in the first place. In its place, he fashioned a makeshift system using laser pointers that worked on the same principle (breaking the beam sets off the alarm).

Each part of the myth came from the movie Entrapment—specifically, the scene where Gin Baker (Catherine Zeta-Jones) and Mac MacDougal (Sean Connery) infiltrate Bedford Palace to steal a priceless mask. Kari and Tory took this on as their first challenge and tested whether a person can successfully navigate a system of laser beam detectors by...

Myth statement	Status	Notes
...blowing cosmetic powder across the beams to identify their position, as Gin did with the final beam.	Busted	While visible beams can be seen, they are detectable only when the powder is airborne, which is not very long. Also, as Kari found, blowing too much powder can cause enough of the beam to break and set off the alarm. Furthermore, most laser systems use invisible infrared laser trip beams.
...using night vision goggles (inspired by Mac's use of a night vision camera to navigate Gin).	Busted	None of the beams are visible through the goggles—Tory was able to see only the points where the beams were hitting. He said that the goggles actually made it harder to get through the lasers because of their effect on his peripheral vision.
...pointing another laser at the photodetector—another technique that Gin used once.	Busted	While the technique is workable enough with visible-beam systems, the fact that infrared beams cannot be readily detected or traced makes locating the relevant photocells too difficult in a real-world situation.

=== Infrared Beam Dodge ===
After getting through the visible lasers, Kari and Tory faced the real-world equivalent: infrared photo-beam detectors. They tested the following methods:

Myth statement	Status	Notes
...the Entrapment techniques (cosmetic powder, night vision goggles, or both)	Busted	Neither Kari's makeup nor Tory's night vision goggles helped them see the infrared beams, and while a combination of the two allowed Tory to catch a momentary glimpse of the infrared beams, Kari still found that she had a problem in that it was still possible to break the beam by blowing too much powder forward.
...using an optical doorway	Busted	In a scene not shown in some versions of the episode, Kari built an apparatus that deflected the beams from mirror to mirror until it reached the receptor while creating a doorway that she and Tory could walk through. However, the device was massive, and just sticking it in was enough to set off the alarm. When Grant temporarily disabled the alarm to give them time to set it up, it did work, but it was deemed busted due to its impracticality.

=== Glass Door Forced Entry ===
To access the jewelry room, Adam and Jamie tested whether glass doors can be breached silently (i.e., without setting off a sonar alarm trained to detect smashing). This was inspired by films often featuring scenes where cat burglars cut holes in glass and remove them with suction cups. Adam and Jamie tested the following techniques in an hour-long practice session and during the test itself:

Myth statement	Status	Notes
...gently cutting the glass and removing it with a suction cup	Busted	The suction cup could not remove the glass.
...thermal shock (extreme hot and then freezing cold to fracture glass along a circular groove)	Busted	When Jamie tried it during a practice run, the method failed catastrophically, so it was not used in the actual test.
...tapping a hole in the glass	Busted	Although it did work, it was far too noisy and set off the alarm during the test.
...drilling a hole	Partly busted	The drilling caused some noise but not enough to trip a sonic alarm. It did, however, cause the entire glass panel to break, but because it was tempered and laminated, the glass held together. Jamie then used pliers to pick out the pieces until an arm-sized hole could open up, allowing access to the doorknob on the other side, but it was a near-impossible task to do consistently.

=== Fooling the Pressure Sensor ===
This myth also came from Entrapment and is the final act of the Bedford Palace mask heist. Tory and Kari faced this as their final challenge, attempting to retrieve a golden Buster idol while testing whether a person can successfully fool a pressure sensor under a glass case by...

Myth statement	Status	Notes
...squeezing in a knife between the glass and sensor and using a piece of gum to hold the sensor in its original position, as Gin did.	Busted	The sensor is extremely sensitive. Even the slight lifting of the case needed to insert the knife can set it off, and it took three attempts just to get the knife in. Also, the freshly chewed gum is too pliable to keep the sensor held down once the knife is removed.
...squeezing in a knife between the glass and sensor and using duct tape to hold it in place.	Plausible	This was Plan B in case the movie myth was busted, as Tory reasoned that they would bring tape if they were in a heist. If one can get the knife in without setting it off, the knife can then be held in place with tape to keep the sensor depressed.
...overloading the pressure sensor.	Plausible	In a segment not shown in some versions of the episode, right before the safecracking, Adam set off a pressure sensor that Grant installed on the floor right in front of the safe. He successfully overloaded it, though, turning the pedestal that had held the Buster idol on its side and putting it on the sensor to overload it.

=== Safecracking ===
As their final challenge, Adam and Jamie were tasked with cracking a safe that turned out to contain a golden jeweled scepter. Adam took the lead and tested whether a safe can be quickly cracked by...

Myth statement	Status	Notes
...using a stethoscope.	Busted	Modern safes are designed with this old technique in mind, and the tumblers proved too quiet to be heard even with amplification.
...drilling a hole and visually causing the tumblers to fall into place.	Plausible	After prying off the safe knob, with help from a borescope and a length of piano wire, Adam managed to crack the safe, but it would take time that may not be available to a surreptitious safecracker (for Adam, 45 minutes), especially given the fact that the safe for the test was rated to be crackable by a professional safecracker in only 5 minutes—although most safecrackers are not normally required to be quiet in doing so.

=== Scaling a Building ===
In a final twist, Grant and Tory challenged Adam to scale a 23-story building by using his suction cups as a cat burglar might in order to get to a helicopter on the roof.

Myth statement	Status	Notes
A suction cup system can be used to scale a (23-story) skyscraper.	Plausible	The concept worked (see the Air Duct Climb section), but Adam did not have the stamina to scale the entire building. Making the climb would be highly visible and requires significant physical training.

== Episode 55 – "Steam Cannon" ==
- Original air date: July 19, 2006

=== Cereal Nutrition ===
A popular saying states that sugary cereal is less nutritious than its box.

Myth statement	Status	Notes
A cereal box can have more nutritional value than the cereal.	Busted	All tests showed that cereal has superior values of calories, fats, sugars, and proteins compared to cardboard. Furthermore, chemicals within the cardboard may be toxic.

Note: Adam and Jamie admitted in an interview that they tried an earlier test of this myth using rats in cooperation with a university. However, of the three groups they used, they found that one of the rats in the group fed cardboard ate the others in the sample when they returned. The decision was later made by Discovery to leave the segment unaired.

=== Steam Cannon ===
A diagram by Leonardo da Vinci blueprints a steam-powered cannon that Archimedes supposedly built.

Myth statement	Status	Notes
Archimedes was able to build a powerful steam cannon by using technology available at the time.	Busted	A flash-boil-powered cannon, built even with modern materials and techniques, was barely able to push a projectile out of the barrel. A more modern pre-boiled, valve-triggered system, such as those used in aircraft catapults, was able to project a cannonball a considerable distance, and it required far less pressure than the MythBusters had originally projected. Also see Holman Projector, which worked on a similar principle.

=== The MythBusters Teeth Challenge ===
This is also referred to as "Which has the whitest teeth." This myth was less a challenge than an inside joke. The MythBusters received many emails from fans complaining about Adam's brown teeth. This was not aired in the US. However, on the Discovery Europe version, it is included in the episode.

Myth statement	Status	Notes
Of all the MythBusters, Adam is the one with the brownest teeth.	Busted, then confirmed	Jamie, Adam, Tory, and Grant all had their teeth checked by Kari. At first, Jamie was the one with the brownest teeth, not Adam. However, after hearing the news, he had his teeth bleached to make them white again. After this, Adam did have the brownest teeth. The overall result, from best to worst, was Grant, Tory, Adam, and finally Jamie (before his bleaching).

== Episode 56 – "Whirlpool/Snowplow" ==
- Original air date: July 26, 2006

=== Whirlpool of Death ===
Whirlpools are an ancient maritime fear. According to the myth, a tidal whirlpool can sink...

Myth statement	Status	Notes
...a container ship.	Busted	For this to happen, the whirlpool would have to be significantly stronger than any maelstrom ever recorded. When tested at the appropriate scale, the whirlpool did not have any noticeable effect on a model container ship.
...a fishing trawler.	Busted	While the scale test did affect a model fishing trawler more visibly than the container ship, the most it did was buffet the model and knock it slightly off-course. Even then, it was not enough to capsize the model, let alone sink it.
...a person.	Plausible	A whirlpool can generate a vortex large enough to pull down a swimmer and, especially if combined with the effects of dizziness and disorientation (which caused Adam to vomit after mere seconds), induce drowning. The MythBusters tested only according to the most powerful maelstrom ever recorded, and they did not determine the minimum size needed to submerge a swimmer.

=== Snowplow Flips Car ===
A fan claims that he saw a car capsize when a snowplow passed by in the opposite direction at high speed.

Myth statement	Status	Notes
A snowplow passing by at high speed can displace enough air on one side to flip over a passing car.	Busted	Even a worst-case scenario—an unusually large plow passing by a light, top-heavy sports utility vehicle at highway speed—could not generate the air pressure needed to cause the SUV to even visibly tip. A semi driving at highway speeds generates only about 1/6 of the air pressure needed to make this myth plausible.

== Episode 57 – "Mentos and Soda" ==
- Original air date: August 9, 2006

=== Diet Coke and Mentos ===
This is the first segment not to be assigned a "busted", "plausible", or "confirmed" rating, as there was no myth to be proved or disproved. Adam and Jamie did the tests simply to dissect the process and determine what actually makes a so-called Diet Coke and Mentos eruption, such as the ones seen on Kari's FHM shoot and on EepyBird.com. However, they did compare their results to the many differing theories given by experts as to how the geyser works, "busting" all of them. (None of the theories had the full list of contributing factors for the geyser, only partial explanations.)

The MythBusters also set a new record for the cola geyser at just over 30 ft (9.1 m) by using a nozzle, beating the previous record of 18 ft (5.5 m), set by the person who popularized the phenomenon, Steve Spangler. They extended the geyser to 34 ft (10 m) by using rock salt, which is more porous and hence provides even more nucleation sites per area than Mentos.

In this episode, Adam and Jamie also created homemade pyrotechnics using water, liquid soap, and methane, and smoke bombs from saltpeter and sugar; demonstrated a way to blow the canister off a stack of Pringles chips by using hydrogen gas, leaving the chips intact; and assembled a dry ice bomb. (Note: A dry ice bomb was demonstrated to be dangerous in a later episode.) Adam also implies that more improvised explosives may be tested for a future episode. Despite the "do not try this at home" disclaimers, the MythBusters concluded that Diet Coke and Mentos geysers are safe enough for people to try, even for children (with the exception of getting into trouble by their parents).

Question	Results
Why does dropping Mentos into a bottle of Diet Coke create a geyser effect?	Mostly because the (uncolored/unglazed version of) Mentos provides nucleation sites for the dissolved carbon dioxide in the Diet Coke to escape as a gas. Other active ingredients in the cascade-effect reaction include aspartame (artificial sweetener), potassium benzoate (preservative), and caffeine in the Diet Coke, and gum arabic and gelatin in the Mentos. The ingredients seem to have a perfect compatibility with each other and, when mixed and added to the nucleation, create a chemical reaction that forces the soda to release all of its dissolved carbon dioxide at once, thus causing a more violent eruption than carbonated water alone.

=== Stamp on a Helicopter ===
Myth statement	Status	Notes
A stamp placed on the rotor of a helicopter can unbalance the spinning rotors enough to cause it to crash.	Busted	A stamp in a controlled scale test did not cause any changes to the helicopter rotor's rotation. The MythBusters immediately ramped up the test to the scale of 8,000 stamps, which destroyed the scale model helicopter. The full-sized test also produced the same results, as the stamp did not cause a real helicopter to crash, and according to the pilot, it did not cause any significant change in the way the helicopter flew. A stamp placed on the tail rotor also did not cause any noticeable change.

== Episode 58 – "Shattering Subwoofer" ==
- Original air date: August 16, 2006

=== Shattering Subwoofer ===
Myth statement	Status	Notes
One can design an automobile sound system such that the bass can quickly shatter all the windows of the automobile.	Busted	While the large, diesel engine-powered subwoofer that Jamie and Adam built into a Mercedes-Benz 240D produced sound at 161 dB_{SPL} at 16 Hz (a level comparable to those found in cars specially designed for loudness competitions), it caused the sunroof of the car to jar loose, allowing for the pressure of the sound waves to escape. Because of this leakage, not to mention the fact that the forces behind the oscillation caused the woofer to break apart, the speaker system could not possibly create the intensity needed to cause all the windows to explode as the myth stated. A best-case scenario would involve only one window failing, thus creating a path for the pressure to escape.

=== Rough Road Driving ===
A spinoff myth was tested in "More Myths Revisited".

Myth statement	Status	Notes
A car will achieve a smoother ride on a rough outback road by being driven faster.	Confirmed	As far as driving on non-washboard roads, there was no solid conclusion due to a conflict of data. However, when they tested a "washboard" road, the Build Team was able to confirm the theory that driving at a higher speed will indeed cause the body of the car to float over the ridges. The wheels of a car oscillated wildly, but the car suspension allowed for a relatively smoother ride at high speed.

== Episode 59 – "Crimes and Myth-Demeanors 2" ==
- Original air date: August 23, 2006

As opposed to the earlier "Crimes and Myth-Demeanors", which focused on security systems as seen in movies, the MythBusters attempted to break real-world security systems, which were all installed in the original assault course.

=== Fingerprint Lock ===
Fingerprint readers take a sample of a fingerprint and match it with an approved-person database. The particular door-mounted scanner tested optically samples the fingerprint, and it had some extra "liveness-sensing" features that supposedly looks for pulse, body heat, and sweat (though, in the end, the door-scanner ended up being fooled much easier than the low-tech fingerprint scanner on Jamie's laptop).

The process was twofold—first, obtaining the thumbprint for the lock (which Kari did by tricking Grant into copying a stack of CDs, thus giving them a copy of the master print) and then devising a method of successfully transcribing the fingerprint to the point that it could be used to bypass the lock. Adam and Jamie used various techniques before finding a technique involving copper-coated circuit boards, acetate, acid washing, and manually amplifying the lines in the fingerprint to their original quality.

After that, the two of them transcribed Grant's thumbprint onto various mediums and then tested whether the biometric fingerprint lock could be cracked by...

Myth statement	Status	Notes
...a copy of an approved fingerprint etched in latex.	Confirmed	Adam first planted the latex on his own thumb to give it warmth and pulse and then found that licking the latex sample (to simulate sweat) was enough to fool the scanner. This allegedly marked the very first time that particular lock had been broken.
...a ballistics gel copy of an approved fingerprint.	Confirmed	Jamie was also able to fool the sensor after adding some moisture to the ballistics gel print.
...a paper copy of an approved fingerprint.	Confirmed	Licking the paper sample (to simulate sweat) was enough to fool the scanner.

=== Thermal Motion Sensor ===
Thermographic cameras note any changes in the temperature gradient within its field of view (as seen in the 1992 film Sneakers). Kari, Tory, and Grant tested whether a thermal motion sensor can be fooled by...

Myth statement	Status	Notes
...cooling the body down using a CO_{2} fire extinguisher.	Busted	Not only was the sensor not fooled, but using a fire extinguisher on a person is dangerous.
...a neoprene diving suit.	Busted	The neoprene suit did insulate Tory's body heat from his surroundings—until the suit itself warmed up.
...being covered in mud. This was inspired by a technique used by Dutch Schaefer (Arnold Schwarzenegger) to fool Predator thermal sensors.	Busted	Like the neoprene suit, this worked only until the mud warmed up from body heat. Also, Tory left behind mud tracks while attempting this, making him easier to track.
...heating the room to body temperature.	Busted	Heating the room from the ceiling immediately set off the sensor, while heating the room from the ground did not. However, the sensor was still sensitive enough to detect the difference between human body temperature and the ambient temperature. The Build Team also attempted piping the heat in from below and then having Grant strip down to his boxers (as close to naked as he dared in an attempt to emit exactly 98.6 degrees Fahrenheit), but that was also unsuccessful.
...wearing a highly insulated fire proximity suit.	Confirmed	In a scene not shown in some versions of the episode, they found that the suit blocked the body heat, preventing the sensor from seeing the wearer. However, a small breach in the suit around Tory's buttocks area triggered the sensor when pointed towards it. Despite that, though, he found he was able to beat the thermal camera by entering the room backwards.
...placing glass between the intruder and the sensor.	Confirmed	Glass blocks out the longer wavelength infrared light used by thermal imaging systems. Kari and Grant were successfully able to hang a pane over the camera by using a clamp and drop right into the room.

=== Ultrasonic Motion Sensor ===
Ultrasonic motion detectors note any Doppler shifts caused by a moving intruder. Kari, Tory, and Grant tested whether an ultrasonic motion detector can be fooled by...

Myth statement	Status	Notes
...wearing thick-padded clothing.	Busted	To test this, Kari made a Big Bird-like costume-cum-stealth suit out of a thick yellow rug, but the sensor was still able to pick up her movement.
...wearing a suit made of fiberglass.	Busted	Kari made a second suit made of the said material, but the alarm went off the instant she set foot in the room.
...holding a bedsheet in front of oneself.	Confirmed	The bedsheet absorbed enough of the ultrasonic waves to mitigate any return signals.
...moving extremely slowly.	Confirmed	Although it took Kari 20 minutes to cross a relatively short hallway, she moved slowly enough to stay below the detector's sampling threshold.

=== Water Safe ===
This myth was based on a scene from the movie The Score, where Nick Wells (Robert De Niro) uses this technique to break into a safe containing a glass relocker.

Myth statement	Status	Notes
A thief can drill into a safe with a thermal lance, fill the safe with water, and detonate an explosive inside without damaging the items inside or prematurely activating the glass relocker.	Plausible	Drilling into a safe by using thermal rods takes far longer than the myth states. Also, the heat from the thermal rods completely destroyed the items inside. Secondly, the safe was not watertight and had to be sealed from the inside to completely fill it with water. Finally, though the explosion successfully dislodged the safe door, none of the items inside remained intact. It was deemed plausible from historical precedent and police reports, though the MythBusters themselves could not replicate any of the conditions. The myth was also tested by the BBC show Hollywood Science, which was able to replicate the scene by using the same type of safe used in The Score.

== Episode 60 – "Earthquake Machine" ==
- Original air date: August 30, 2006

=== Miniature Earthquake Machine ===
The MythBusters tested one of Nikola Tesla's publications.

Myth statement	Status	Notes
Tesla's oscillator: Nikola Tesla invented a small steam-powered machine that, when attached to an object or building and tuned to vibrate at a certain frequency, can cause an earthquake-like effect on the object to which it is attached.	Busted	The MythBusters built several variations of Tesla's machine by using modified jackhammers, as well as a specially designed computer-controlled electromechanical linear actuator provided by Grant. Small-scale tests on metal bars produced mixed results, with the modified tools performing poorly, while the more finely tunable actuator produced significant vibrations in the bar. A scale-model test with a model of Tesla's lab and miniature motor failed to produce any noticeable result. Finally, a full-scale test was attempted: The MythBusters attached the resonator to the side of the 1927 span of the Carquinez Bridge, a large truss bridge of a type today designed to withstand such vibrations, to see whether the entire bridge would be shaken. The resonator could be tuned to the bridge's resonant frequency; it did produce a vibration, noticeable "hundreds of feet away", like "a big semitrailer truck cruising by", but not remotely of earthquake strength. The MythBusters declared the myth busted.

=== Exploding Lava Lamp ===
Kari, Tory, and Grant began by examining the news story that 24-year-old Philip Quinn had been killed two years beforehand in his trailer home in Kent, Washington, after he heated a lava lamp on his stove, only for it to blow up and send a glass shard into his chest. This earned them the moniker of "MSI: Myth Scene Investigation", an homage to CSI. They eventually tested whether the following can potentially blow up with lethal consequences if heated on a stove by heating the material in question on a stove and placing a ballistics gel torso with an actual human ribcage and a fake heart near the stove so that they could examine potential injuries:

Myth statement	Status	Notes
...a lava lamp	Confirmed	All lava lamp tests produced violent reactions, with the reactions differing depending on the lamp's design: When lava lamps with safety caps exploded, they vented their contents out through the tops of the lamps because of the safety caps popping off (as designed).; The Build Team then tested a bottle-capped lava lamp, which leaked due to a poor seal. Grant then blew the lava lamp up using a squirt of cold water from a spray bottle to induce thermal shock—and the explosion lodged a piece of glass deep into the ballistics gel dummy planted near the lamp. With the combination of the violent explosion, glass shrapnel in the dummy, explicit warning labels (including a notice not to heat the lamp with anything besides the provided bulb), and the recorded incident, the myth was deemed confirmed.; Once the Build Team tested the other containers, they ran a last test with a jumbo lava lamp, which exploded with enough force to pierce the dummy with numerous shards of glass.
...a can of beans	Confirmed	The cans of beans tested exploded with force proportional to the size of the can. Larger cans explode more violently than smaller cans, especially since large cans do not have a weakened pop-open top, but the Build Team concluded that any can of beans on a stove is potentially lethal.
...a can of potted meat (such as Spam)	Busted	Though the can of potted meat exploded rather violently, the explosion did not have enough force to be deemed lethal.
...a large glass jug of milk	Plausible	The jar of milk exploded violently, though not with a large amount of force. The Build Team concluded that an exploding jar of milk could be lethal if a person happened to be standing over it.

== Episode 61 – "Deadly Straw" ==
- Original air date: September 6, 2006

=== Straw Through a Palm Tree ===
Myth statement	Status	Notes
A piece of straw can penetrate all the way through a palm tree if propelled by hurricane-force winds.	Busted	Propelling a piece of straw at a palm tree at a distance of 50 cm (20 in) at 320 mph (510 km/h) (the world record for recorded wind speed at ground level), the straw managed to penetrate the tree only a quarter of an inch. Even firing at the tree while it was bent (to increase the size of the pores in the surface of the tree) at point-blank range added no additional distance into the tree. A piece of reed was tested as the sturdiest organic object that might be mistaken for a piece of straw. At both ranges, the reed managed to go only about two inches into the tree. Additionally, Jamie tried a piece of piano wire, and at 50 cm, it flew not only through the tree but also through a sheet of plywood on the wall behind it, partially embedding itself into the concrete wall.
Wind alone can blow the feathers off a chicken.	Busted	Even wind speeds faster than those ever recorded could not remove any of the feathers of a tethered chicken. The whole bird would more likely be blown away completely.

=== Primary Perception ===
The Build Team tested world-renowned polygrapher Cleve Backster's theory of primary perception.

Myth statement	Status	Notes
Polygraph tests indicate all living things share some form of interconnected consciousness.	Busted	Tests were done by connecting plants to a polygraph's galvanometer and then employing actual and imagined harm upon the plants or upon others in the plant's vicinity. The galvanometer showed some spurious readings (showing some kind of reaction about one-third of the time), so a much more accurate EEG machine was used. When Grant and Tory used a machine that dropped eggs randomly into boiling water, the plant had no reaction. Additionally, Tory's leukocytes had no reaction when Kari shocked him with a stungun.

== Episode SP9 – "Mega Movie Myths" ==
- Original air date: September 13, 2006

Adam, Jamie, Buster, and the Build Team are watching movie myths they have done in the past, and they decide to dedicate a whole episode to them. This episode is a two-hour special.

Myth statement	Status	Notes
The Dukes of Hazzard: A car can jump a significant distance using a pile of soil as a ramp and land with minimal damage or loss of momentum.	Busted	The car managed to jump 172 ft (52 m), 3 ft (0.91 m) short of the estimated span of the gorge jumped in the movie. However, the car crashed nose-down and the front and engine were crumpled, busting the myth (and the car). It is somewhat widely known that stunt cars are often heavily damaged by bigger jumps and must subsequently be scrapped (see The General Lee).
Big Trouble in Little China: A lock can be broken by shooting it with handguns.	Busted	The 9-mm pistol and the .357 Magnum failed to open either the padlocks or the deadbolts.
Various movies: A lock can be broken by shooting it with shotgun slugs or high-powered rifle ammunition.	Plausible	Both types of ammunition were able to disable the locks by completely obliterating them. However, the MythBusters note that this lock-busting method would be very dangerous in real life due to ricochet or spalling. Because of this hazard, military and SWAT units use a special shotgun cartridge called a breaching round to break through doors.
Goldfinger or Austin Powers in Goldmember: A car can be equipped with a discreet ejector seat.	Plausible	A pneumatic ejector seat fitted into a boxy Toyota car seemed to fool most of the people who inspected it, and the seat successfully launched a test dummy out of the car. However, the design of the car plays a huge role in concealability, which is why Jamie and Adam opted for a roomier, boxier car rather than one of the flashy and sleek sports cars often seen in spy movies. Sports cars have windshields that extend partially over the front seats, making it difficult for an ejector seat to properly launch without hitting the frame.
Indiana Jones and the Temple of Doom: A person can fall through layers of awnings and survive.	Plausible	Buster was broken into pieces during the fall, but he "survived" his fall (according to the shock sensors) with less-than-lethal (but still serious) "injuries". Tory then demonstrated the movie method of using pre-cut awnings and safety wires (after Adam was prevented by the show's insurance from doing it himself).
Underworld: One can escape through a floor by shooting through it in a circular pattern.	Busted	A fully automatic MP5 failed to break through the support beams underneath the floor in any reasonable amount of time, even with the assistance of a 12-gauge shotgun. Tory also had to fire all 360 of his rounds of ammunition to even come close to breaking through. Finally, due to the close proximity of the shots to the shooter, flying debris and the possibility of ricochets make this method extremely dangerous.
The Count of Monte Cristo: A sword can cut off the blade of another sword.	Busted	The team tested impacts between various types of swords. A genuine Japanese-constructed katana sliced through a replica stainless-steel sword, and it also broke a genuine sword through stress fracturing. The katana bent a rapier until it snapped, but it did not cut through the blade. When a Claymore struck the katana, the katana flexed but did not break. A Viking sword then severely nicked the claymore. In the end, though some swords did break, none of them were actually "cut" by the impacting sword. A spinoff myth was tested in "More Myths Revisited".
Unofficial Myth: The MythBusters really know how to ruin a movie.	Confirmed	Tory storms out at the end of the special and says, "You guys 'really' know how to ruin a movie", to which Adam replies, "That's confirmed."

== Episode 62 – "Killer Cable Snaps" ==
- Original air date: October 11, 2006

=== Killer Cable Slice ===
Myth statement	Status	Notes
If a cable snaps, it can cut a person in two (as seen in the movie Ghost Ship).	Busted	A 5/8-inch (1.59 cm) cable at 30,000 pounds-force (130,000 N) of tension was unable to cut a pig in two (or even cut into it), but it did cause potentially lethal injuries. The MythBusters took the test even further by adding a smaller cable at the end of a larger one to create a "whip" effect, and they even looped a cable around the pig itself. None of these methods could cut the pig by the pretensioned cable's inertia alone. The pig was cut in half only when Adam tied a cable around it before tightening the cable. Also, after making inquiries with almost every safety organization imaginable, the MythBusters were unable to find any concrete evidence of a person being cut in half by a snapped cable.

=== Pottery Record (Archaeoacoustics) ===
Myth statement	Status	Notes
Sounds can be recovered from old pottery, called archaeoacoustics (based on the episode "Hollywood A.D." from The X-Files).	Busted	The MythBusters were unable to recover any recognizable sound from the pot by using a record player with a glass needle (to prevent scratching the clay). Even with professional audio enhancement and the most advanced sound systems available, they were unable to recover any discernible sounds from the straw-made grooves on the pots.

== Episode 63 – "Air Cylinder Rocket" ==
- Original air date: October 18, 2006

=== Air Cylinder of Death ===
A compressed air cylinder can...

Myth statement	Status	Notes
...blast itself through a concrete wall.	Confirmed	Once the MythBusters constructed a launch tube and perfected shearing off the cylinder's valve, the cylinder shot entirely through their constructed cinder block wall and damaged the solid concrete wall behind it. The MythBusters were also aware of recorded instances of such a thing happening.
...power a speedboat.	Busted	The two cylinders could only propel the modified speedboat 120 ft (37 m) at a maximum of 5 kn (9.3 km/h; 5.8 mph). A second attempt resulted in the boat barely making half the distance and barely registering any speed at all.

=== Gunpowder Engine ===
Myth statement	Status	Notes
An engine can run on gunpowder alone.	Busted	The team (incorrectly) concluded that gunpowder has a greater energy density than gasoline and proceeded to test three historical designs (by Huygens, Cayley, and Paine) for gunpowder engines, none of which worked for more than one cycle. The team could not find a practical or reliable way to feed the gunpowder into the engines without having them backfire and ignite all the powder, most likely because black powder is not a liquid and therefore is not transported as easily; also, gunpowder cannot be ignited while mixed in with liquid (even flammable lubricating oil), so it must be dry for the engine to work. They were also unable to convert a modern lawnmower engine to run on gunpowder, even with gunpowder inserted directly into the ignition chamber.

== Episode 64 – "More Myths Revisited" ==
- Original air date: October 25, 2006

This was the fifth episode where myths from previous episodes were revisited.

=== Sword vs. Gun ===
Myth statement	Status	Notes
A sword can cut a machine gun in two. (Spinoff of Sword vs. Sword)	Busted	The team heated the barrel from a .30-caliber Browning machine gun until it was red hot and struck it with the sword machine, which simply resulted in a small gouge in the barrel even though the barrel's outer heat-dissipating shroud had been removed and the machine was swinging the sword with power that significantly exceeded a normal human's capabilities. The team then rapidly heated and cooled the barrel to make it more brittle, but when hit by the sword again, it shattered instead of being cut. Finally, the team tried to cut a thinner Thompson submachine gun barrel, but the sword only bent it.

=== Rough Road Driving ===
Myth statement	Status	Notes
Bracing a windshield can keep it from shattering. (Spinoff of Rough Road Driving)	Busted	Bracing a window with a hand was unsuccessful in preventing a window from being shattered by a rock or a fired BB.

=== Salami Rocket ===
This marked the first time a confirmed myth was disputed. In this case, the claim was that the rocket launched not due to the two-part hybrid reaction but simply due to the release of the pressurized nitrous oxide.

Myth statement	Status	Notes
A Hybrid Rocket can use salami as fuel. (From Salami Rocket)	Re-confirmed	Using salami as a rocket fuel can create high amounts of thrust with the right nozzle. Readings from the force gauge proved that salami did in fact generate much more thrust than just the released nitrous oxide alone, though they do admit that the nitrous oxide output alone could have launched the rocket, as may have been the case with the original launch.

=== Tailgate Up vs. Tailgate Down ===
Myth statement	Status	Notes
It is more fuel efficient to drive a pickup truck with its tailgate down, rather than up. (From Tailgate Up vs. Tailgate Down)	Re-busted	Using a calibrated fuel flow gauge, Adam and Jamie first re-busted the Tailgate Up vs. Tailgate Down myth, then went on to test various other truck configurations (hard top, mesh tailgate, and no tailgate).
A plastic mesh tailgate provides superior fuel efficiency compared to the standard metal tailgate.	Confirmed	Again using a calibrated fuel flow gauge, Adam and Jamie proved that the mesh was the most efficient way to configure a pickup truck. The fans stated that the truck mesh was the worst tailgate to use, which the MythBusters proved wrong.

== Episode 65 – "Exploding Lighter" ==
- Original air date: November 1, 2006

=== Exploding Lighter ===
The MythBusters tested the following myths concerning standard disposable butane lighters.

Myth statement	Status	Notes
A lighter can explode when placed under a welding tool.	Confirmed	The heat generated from the welding tool was hot enough to cause the plastic lighter to melt and release its fuel, which ignited, causing a small explosion.
A lighter can explode when put in a laundry dryer.	Busted	A lighter was left in a running laundry dryer but suffered no significant damage and therefore did not explode.
A lighter can explode when hit with a golf club.	Partly confirmed	Hitting a lighter with a golf club did not make the lighter explode, but when the MythBusters decided to hit the lighter while it was lit, it exploded rather violently.
A lighter can explode on a car dashboard.	Busted	The lighter was put in a toaster oven to simulate the maximum temperature that the interior of a car can reach, around 180 °F (82 °C). There was no reaction for several hours, and the lighter finally exploded when the MythBusters ramped the temperature up to over 350 °F (177 °C), well above any temperature that can be expected in the interior of a car in atmospheric conditions.
A single lighter can be lethal if it explodes.	Busted	The MythBusters placed a lighter in a pair of jeans on a pig carcass used as a human stand-in and put it under a welding tool. The sparks and heat from the tool managed to set the pants on fire and burn the flesh but failed to ignite the lighter.
500 lighters packed inside a car can explode with lethal force.	Plausible	The MythBusters placed 500 lighters in a car and slowly heated it up. One by one, lighters began to rupture and release gas fumes. When the MythBusters finally triggered an igniter, the gas fumes exploded, blowing out all of the windows and setting the car on fire. The myth was deemed possible as long as a suitable ignition source is present.

=== Gunslinger Myths ===
Using a Colt Peacemaker and a Navy revolver, the MythBusters tested whether an Old West gunslinger could...

Myth statement	Status	Notes
...drop a coin and fire his pistol five times before it hits the ground.	Busted	Using replicas of actual Wild West pistols, Grant, Kari, and Tory attempted the stunt themselves. However, Grant and Kari were unable to clear the pistols from their holsters in time, and Tory was able to get off only one shot. Grant then built a device that showed that the pistols consistently jammed when the MythBusters tried to fire them so quickly. The MythBusters finally turned to a professional gunslinger, Larry Hamby, but he could fire only three shots, and he stated that firing five in that period of time would be "extremely difficult". With no results, the myth was busted.
...shoot a hole through a silver dollar.	Busted	The MythBusters used actual period silver dollars for the test. A professional gunslinger proved that hitting the coin was possible (if thrown correctly, on the first try) by piercing a lead coin. Both the Peacemaker and Navy revolver were able to only dent the silver dollar. While a .357 Magnum could easily pierce the coin, the myth was busted because the .357 was not introduced until the 1930s—gunslingers did not have access to it. However, retrying the myth with lead coins instead of silver did yield large holes from both period weapons.
...save a man from being hanged by shooting the rope.	Busted	Firing at a rope with the pistols, even at point-blank range, failed to break the rope. The bullets were merely deflected off the rope. A professional gunslinger armed with a more powerful Winchester repeating rifle managed to shoot and break the rope, but it required multiple tries to pull off. With the difficulty involved in shooting and breaking the rope, the myth was considered busted. The gunslinger also commented that it would have been easier to just shoot the executioners.

== Episode 66 – "Concrete Glider" ==
- Original air date: November 8, 2006

=== Concrete Glider ===
This myth was part of a well-known engineering cliché: "Like a lead balloon, you cannot make a concrete glider fly."

Myth statement	Status	Notes
A glider can be made out of concrete.	Plausible	Adam's glider made a flight of over 34 ft (10 m) from a height of 9 ft (2.7 m), while Jamie's took a nosedive (albeit Adam used an aerotow launch for his glider, while Jamie merely threw his from a gantry). Also, an expert noted that making a glider out of concrete is possible and that the Germans experimented with the idea during World War II. After the test, the MythBusters decided that making a concrete glider is possible but highly dangerous and impractical since the brittle concrete would shatter once it hits the ground.

See also Lead Balloon.

=== Train Suction ===
Myth statement	Status	Notes
The vortex from a passing train can suck a person onto the tracks.	Busted	Although small-scale testing with model trains in a wind tunnel showed a vortex, the more dominant force when running the full-size train was the air turbulence running alongside and away from the train. The force caused Ted, a dummy made of ballistics gel, to simply fall down where he stood rather than be drawn into the train's wake, and also violently pushed around an empty stroller tethered onto the platform alongside. Despite the lack of suction, the MythBusters agreed that the turbulence was powerful enough in its own right to make standing that close to the train as it passes very dangerous.

== Episode 67 – "Firearms Folklore" ==
- Original air date: November 29, 2006

This is the last episode to use the original opening sequence and the last before filming started in high-definition.

=== Firearms Folklore ===
A portion of this myth was revisited in "More Myths Reopened".

Myth statement	Status	Notes
A bullet can be shot into the empty chamber of another revolver.	Confirmed	The MythBusters were actually able to fire a bullet straight down the chamber of the test revolver. The bullet went in and lodged itself inside the chamber, matching the picture they had.
A sniper can kill another sniper by shooting straight through the scope. (see Carlos Hathcock)	Busted	Using a police industry-standard SWAT sniper rifle and standard police match ammunition, the MythBusters fired several shots at a scoped rifle mounted on a ballistics gel dummy. The bullet was unable to hit the dummy. It was either stopped or deflected by the multiple layers of lenses in the scope, leaving the dummy relatively unharmed. Without any clear evidence that a bullet can penetrate a sniper scope, the MythBusters decided to label the myth as busted. This myth was originally labeled "busted", but due to much debate by viewers, it was revisited in episode 75. Using a period-accurate scope (this myth originates from reports of Carlos Hathcock in the Vietnam War), as well as armor-piercing rounds, it was found to be plausible.
During the Civil War, two soldiers' bullets collided in midair and fused.	Plausible	The MythBusters first tried to mount two Civil War rifles in front of each other so that when fired, the bullets (lead Minié balls) would collide in midair. However, this proved impossible because they were unable to get the guns to fire at the same time. Instead, they aimed a single rifle at a bullet suspended in the air. The fired bullet hit dead center, and the MythBusters found that both bullets had fused into a single mass. Though very unlikely, it is possible for two bullets to collide and fuse in midair.

=== Hammer vs. Hammer ===
This myth was brought up by concerned viewers, who feared that Jamie was in risk of suffering from the myth each time he banged two hammers together as part of a build.

This myth was revisited in "More Myths Reopened".

Myth statement	Status	Notes
If two hammers strike each other, or a hammer strikes an anvil, at least one hammer will completely shatter with lethal force.	Busted	Using a custom rig, the MythBusters repeatedly struck pairs of hammers together, but none shattered. Hammers with wooden handles merely snapped in two, and hammers with metal handles bent. The MythBusters then decided to make the steel hammers harder and more brittle by adding more carbon and through heat treatment. In particular, they attempted to case harden the hammers. They heated the hammers to high temperatures and then coated the hammerheads in used engine oil. They also decided to have the hammers strike a more sturdy anvil instead of each other. However, during testing, the carbonized hammers merely bent at the handles without shattering. Though the myth was busted, some hammers come with warnings not to use them to strike another tool or hardened nail with excessive force; although no hammerhead shattered or chipped, high-speed footage showed particle dust flying in all directions, which can present a potential eye hazard.

== Episode 68 – "Anti-Gravity Device" ==
- Original air date: December 6, 2006

This was the first episode to feature the new opening sequence and be filmed in high-definition.

=== Anti-gravity ===
Anti-gravity is a hypothetical force that eliminates the effects of gravity on an object (as opposed to counteracting it). The MythBusters tested various devices that claimed to produce anti-gravity.

Myth statement	Status	Notes
Anti-gravity is possible.	Busted (for now)	After testing various contraptions that were allegedly able to defy gravity, the MythBusters found none of them could actually achieve "anti-gravity"; the contraptions (that did levitate) generated an upward force that balanced their downward gravitation. The myth was declared busted (for now) because, although they could bust the contraptions as anti-gravity machines, the idea of anti-gravity itself could not be busted through their tests.

=== Christmas Lights ===
Christmas tree fires are common during the winter holidays and cause millions of dollars in damage annually in America alone. The MythBusters tested one hypothesis on the cause of a Christmas tree fire.

Myth statement	Status	Notes
The heat generated by Christmas lights can ignite a Christmas tree.	Busted	After rigging a tinder-dry Christmas tree with 2,500 C9 Christmas lights (for a total of 17.5 kW) and waiting for at least 40 minutes, the MythBusters were unable to get the tree to ignite by itself. Instead, they used an artificially created spark (simulating a short circuit) to set the tree on fire. Though the myth was busted, Adam and Jamie noted how quickly the tree caught on fire once it was ignited, warning viewers to be careful around their Christmas trees. Also, Adam and Jamie proved that a single extension cord can be overloaded with too many lights, causing the cord to produce significant heat due to its electrical resistance, which can burn the cord's insulation, which they theorize is the primary reason for Christmas tree fires.

=== Vodka Myths IV ===
Myth statement	Status	Notes
Vodka can cure the pain of a jellyfish sting.	Confirmed	After receiving a sting from a jellyfish and then treating the wound with vodka, Kari noticed that most of the pain from the sting had disappeared. Vodka-based treatment seemed to have worked about as well as the traditional warm water-based solution.

== Episode SP10 – "Holiday Special" ==
- Original air date: December 6, 2006

The MythBusters test various holiday myths.

If a frozen turkey falls, it can...

Myth statement	Status	Notes
...crush a foot.	Confirmed	The frozen turkey completely crushed a ballistics gel foot, breaking many of the simulated bones embedded in it.
...crush a dog or cat.	Plausible	Two ballistics gel replicas of dogs were used and were completely crushed. When they were taken to a veterinarian for analysis, it was determined that if the dogs managed to survive their injuries, their prognosis would not be good. The myth was deemed plausible because the MythBusters were unable (and unwilling) to test the myth on real animals.

The following myths state that a turkey can be cooked with...

Myth statement	Status	Notes
...a microwave radio.	Busted	The MythBusters were unable to attach the turkey to a full-size radio antenna, though the manager stated that the antenna used only several watts of power compared to the several hundred used by microwave ovens. The MythBusters then tried to test the myth on a smaller vehicle-mounted microwave dish, but the only heating recorded was from sitting in the sun.
...a radar.	Busted	The MythBusters attached the turkey to the spinning radar antenna on the SS Jeremiah O'Brien, but when the turkey was measured, they found that it actually lost heat. Frustrated with the lack of results, Tory inserted an explosive stuffing into the turkey and put it in a microwave, resulting in a large explosion.

The MythBusters tried several household methods in an attempt to prevent a freshly cut Christmas tree from shedding its needles over six weeks. One can keep needles from falling off the Christmas tree by adding...

Myth statement	Status	Notes
...fertilizer.	Busted	Fertilized Christmas trees lost the most needles, and they became very discolored.
...bleach.	Plausible	The bleach was tied with nitric oxide at fewest needles lost, but the tree looked sickly.
...lemon lime soda.	Plausible	Lemon lime soda was somewhat effective in retaining needles.
...pain reliever.	Plausible	Pain reliever was somewhat effective in retaining needles.
...nitric oxide from Viagra, referred to as "Santa's little helper" on-show as a form of self censorship, and the brand was never mentioned by name on the show.	Plausible	The nitric oxide was tied with bleach at fewest needles lost, but the tree looked sickly.
...hairspray.	Plausible	Though declared the winner for being both the best-looking and among the best in terms of controlling needle loss, the added flammability of the hairspray to the drying Christmas tree could increase the tree's natural fire hazard risk.
...urethane.	Plausible	Urethane was somewhat effective in retaining needles.
...nothing (control).	Busted	The tree that received normal water lost more needles than any other tree except the one that received fertilizer.

The MythBusters created a Rube Goldberg machine using Diet Coke and Mentos.

Myth statement	Status	Notes
The MythBusters can build a successful holiday-themed Rube Goldberg machine within a week's time.	Confirmed	Though this was not an actual myth, the MythBusters decided it would be fun to build a holiday-themed Rube Goldberg machine. Using various household objects such as Mentos, Diet Coke, a bowling ball, various toys, and a roast turkey, the MythBusters appeared to create a successful Rube Goldberg machine that knocked Buster out of a chair after several tries. In the unedited version of one take (on the MythBusters Discovery website, probably the second trial from the episode), problems with the objects prevented the machine from running smoothly on its own, prompting the MythBusters to force it to work all the way through. Finally, on the 10th trial, they successfully made the machine work all by itself. Although they did have much experience with creating Rube Goldberg machines in the past, the time constraint given for this particular one almost proved too much for them to handle (usually, it takes them two to three weeks to build a machine and a few days to shoot it; with this particular one, they had only a week to build and shoot it).

== Episode 69 – "22,000-Foot Fall" ==
- Original air date: December 13, 2006

=== 22,000 Foot Fall ===
During World War II, an Allied airman, Alan Magee, fell out of the underside ball turret of his B-17 at 22,000 ft (6,706 m) and survived. The MythBusters test one version of this story. According to the explosives expert used for the episode, this was the largest explosion executed for MythBusters up to that time with 500 lb (227 kg) of dynamite and detcord and was ignited with 2 blasting caps as Adam mentions in the dialog: one for the detcord, and the other for the balloons. The resulting explosion traveled at a velocity of 21,000 ft (6,401 m) per second, and while their ballistics gel dummy, nicknamed "Ted", went off course and missed the train station, the amount of debris produced by the explosion led the Mythbusters to conclude that, if not from the fall or the explosion, the airman would likely have been killed by the shrapnel (While the Mythbusters acknowledged that an airman did in fact survive a 22,000 foot fall during WWII, they concluded that this was not the reason why).

Myth statement	Status	Notes
A 22,000-foot (6,706 m) fall is survivable if one falls through a glass ceiling and a 1,000-pound (450 kg) bomb explodes below oneself.	Busted	In both the small-scale and full-scale tests, the MythBusters observed that the shockwave from the blast had little effect on the speed of falling bodies. Also, the shrapnel and shockwave from the explosion would most likely kill the falling person if the fall itself did not.

=== Lights On/Off ===
Throughout the series, Jamie had always pressured his M5 Industries employees and MythBusters production staff to turn the lights off whenever they leave a room to save electricity. The Build Team tested whether Jamie was correct in his assertion. During this myth, Grant and Kari visited the Livermore-Pleasanton Fire Department in California to see the Centennial Light.

Myth statement	Status	Notes
Due to the power surge required to turn on the lights, leaving a light on will save electricity.	Busted	Through numerous tests, the MythBusters calculated that the power surge from turning on a light would simply consume as much power as leaving it on for a fraction of a second (except for fluorescent tube lights; the startup consumed about 23 seconds' worth of power). Furthermore, the wear and tear of turning the light on and off repeatedly did not reduce the bulb's total life expectancy enough to offset the increased electricity usage. Therefore, it is far more economical to turn a light off rather than leaving it on.
