= MythBusters (2005 season) =

- No. of episodes: 26 (includes 7 specials)

Release
- Original network: Discovery Channel
- Original release: February 2 – November 16, 2005

Season chronology
- ← Previous; 2004 season Next → 2006 season

The cast of the television series MythBusters perform experiments to verify or debunk urban legends, old wives' tales, and the like. This is a list of the various myths tested on the show, as well as the results of the experiments (the myth is busted, plausible, or confirmed).

== Episode overview ==
No. overall	No. in season	Title	Original release date
29	Special–1	"Buster Special"	February 2, 2005
Buster is rebuilt after sustaining a year's worth of abuse. Note: This is a special episode.
30	Special–2	"Ultimate MythBusters"	February 9, 2005
Jamie and Adam have a contest to prove who is the Ultimate MythBuster. Note: This is a special episode.
31	1	"Brown Note"	February 16, 2005
Myths tested: Can a person be blown away by a bullet? Can a certain note make a person have fecal incontinence? Does Chinese water torture work?
32	2	"Salsa Escape"	February 23, 2005
Myths tested: Can a person escape from prison using salsa? Can hardened cement be removed from a cement truck using explosives?
33	3	"Exploding Port-a-Potty"	March 2, 2005
Myths tested: Can a car pole-vault from its drive shaft if it hits a pothole? Can a port-a-potty gather enough methane to explode?
34	4	"Is Yawning Contagious?"	March 9, 2005
Myths tested: Can a toy car beat a Dodge Viper in a quarter-mile downhill race? Is yawning contagious? Does buttered toast always land buttered-side down?
35	Special–3	"MythBusters Outtakes"	March 16, 2005
This episode showed outtakes from the series. Note: This is a special episode.
36	5	"Cooling a Six-Pack"	March 23, 2005
Myths tested: What is the fastest way to cool a six-pack of beer? Was a battery able to be used for certain tasks in ancient times?
37	6	"Son of a Gun"	March 30, 2005
Myths tested: Could using a phone in a thunderstorm result in being electrocuted? Could a bullet pass through a man's genitals, into a woman's abdomen, and make the woman pregnant? Can a boat be driven with its trailer still attached? Note: This is the final regular episode appearance of Scottie Chapman and final appearance of "Mythtern" Christine Chamberlain.
38	Special–4	"Shop 'til You Drop"	April 6, 2005
The MythBusters showed their favorite places to shop. Note: This is a special episode.
39	Special–5	"MythBusters Revealed"	April 27, 2005
This is a behind the scenes insight of MythBusters, featuring interviews, as well as exploring personal issues between the hosts. Note: This is a special episode.
40	Special–6	"Hollywood on Trial"	May 11, 2005
Myths tested: Will bullets spark when ricocheting off other objects? Did the aluminium paint used on Buddy Ebsen, the actor originally slated to play the Tin Man in the 1939 movie version of The Wizard of Oz cause an adverse reaction that hospitalized him? Is it possible for a medium-to-large build man to break through a wooden door frame on his own power? Is it possible to be thrown through a glass window and walk away without a scratch? Is it possible to ignite a pool of gasoline using only a cigarette? Note: This is a special episode. It was the first appearance of Grant Imahara.
41	7	"Breaking Glass"	May 18, 2005
Myths tested: Can an unamplified human voice shatter a wine glass? Does a rolling stone gather moss? Can a vacuum cleaner be converted into a jet engine?
42	8	"Jet Pack"	June 9, 2005
Myths tested: Can a jet pack be created from plans on the Internet? Do pyramids have special powers?
43	9	"Killer Brace Position"	June 22, 2005
Myths tested: Is the brace position recommended in airplane crashes actually designed to kill people? Is driving while talking on the cell phone as dangerous as driving drunk?
44	10	"Bulletproof Water"	July 13, 2005
Myths tested: Will diving underwater protect a person from bullets? Can a person swing 360° on a swing set?
45	Special–7	"Jaws Special"	July 17, 2005
Myths tested: Will a scuba tank explode if shot? Can piano wire be used to catch a shark? Can a shark ram through a boat or shark cage? Can a shark hold three flotation barrels under water? Note: This is a special double-length episode. It was a Jaws-themed episode.
46	11	"Border Slingshot"	July 27, 2005
Myths tested: Is it possible to slingshot a person over the border and onto a mattress?
47	12	"Killer Tissue Box"	August 3, 2005
Myths tested: Can a tissue box in the back of a car kill the driver if the car crashes? Is it possible to split an arrow by hitting it with another?
48	13	"Escape Slide Parachute"	August 10, 2005
Myths tested: Can a person make a parachute with an airplane escape slide or life raft? Will hair cream explode in the right conditions and decapitate the pilot of a fighter plane? Can a stewardess survive a 33,000-foot fall while still strapped into her seat?
49	14	"MythBusters Revisited"	October 12, 2005
Myths tested: Can a person be blown away by a bullet? (Revisit of: Blown Away); Can a bullet cause explosive decompression and tear a plane apart? (Revisit of: Explosive Decompression); Is running better than walking to keep dry in the rain? (Revisit of: Who Gets Wetter?); If someone falls off a building, can that person glide to safety using a sheet of plywood? (Revisit of: Plywood Builder); Does a person save more gas by driving with the AC on instead of having the windows down? (Revisit of: AC vs. Windows Down); Can a gas tank explode when shot by a bullet? (Revisit of: Car Capers); Will a black car heat faster than a white one?
50	15	"Chinese Invasion Alarm"	October 19, 2005
Myths tested: Could the Ancient Chinese have used drums to listen for tunneling invaders? Is the five second rule true?
51	16	"Confederate Rocket"	October 26, 2005
Myths tested: Did the Confederates really have a two-stage rocket capable of traveling 100 miles from Richmond to DC?
52	17	"Vodka Myths"	November 2, 2005
Myths tested: Can two semi-trucks collide head-on and completely crush a compact car? Can vodka cure foot odor or bad breath?
53	18	"Steel Toe-Cap Amputation"	November 9, 2005
Myths tested: Do steel toe boots really put toes in more danger than a regular boot, to the extent that the steel toe would chop off the wearer's toes? Can bottle rockets be used to launch a human?
54	19	"Seasickness – Kill or Cure"	November 16, 2005
Myths tested: What is the best cure for seasickness? Is it more efficient to drive a truck with its tailgate up than down? Can sticking one's finger in a gun barrel stop a bullet?

== Episode SP1 – "Buster Special" ==
- Original air date: February 2, 2005

In this episode, Adam and Jamie relived Buster's finest moments, from his introduction in Exploding Toilet to his ultimate demise (supposedly in Ming Dynasty Astronaut), and showed the construction of the new "Buster 2.0". These moments include:

- Exploding Toilet
- Barrel of Bricks
- Hammer Bridge Drop
- Raccoon Rocket
- The Mad Trombonist
- Forest Fire Scuba Diver
- Elevator of Death
- Boom-Lift Catapult
- Plywood Builder
- Ming Dynasty Astronaut

== Episode SP2 – "Ultimate MythBusters" ==
- Original air date: February 9, 2005

In this episode, Adam and Jamie competed in a series of bizzare tests and competitions to determine which of the two was the "Ultimate MythBuster". These competitions tested their ingenuity, constitution, and courage to determine how far they were willing to go to claim the title of "Ultimate MythBuster".

Challenge	Winner	Notes
Challenge 1: Build a machine that can shoot a tortilla as far as possible.	Jamie	Adam and Jamie had to first construct machines. Adam had built an arm out of wood. His machine took the tortilla and threw it between two aluminum plates. Jamie designed and built a cannon, made from pipe and a compressed air tank. Adam used all three attempts allowed by the competition rules, and his best shot was 60 feet (18 m). In Jamie's first (and only) shot, the tortilla was projected 73 feet (22 m).
Challenge 2: The fear test	Draw	The East Bay Vivarium presented a selection of creatures (corn snakes, tarantulas, African emperor scorpions, and Tanzanian giant millipedes) to test the MythBusters' courage. The scorpions had the most effect on the two, but in this challenge, no winner was determined.
Challenge 3: Guess the weight of three items.	Adam	Adam and Jamie had to guess the weight of three items: a toy car, an angel statue, and a hatch from a plane. Both were to wager two guesses: the first by observing the item, and the second by holding it. Adam guessed more accurately on all three occasions.
Challenge 4: Build a device to drop an egg (without breaking it) with the help of two oranges, two latex gloves, paper, 5 ft (1.5 m) of tape, 20 ft (6.1 m) of string, and "other assorted trash found lying around the workshop". Each person has two attempts.	Jamie	Adam created a cone made of paper. He put an orange on the bottom, and the egg was placed inside the inflated gloves. He broke his egg on the first attempt, but he was successful on the second. Jamie first ate his orange and put the egg inside the orange peel. The orange went in one glove, and he tied it to a string. At the other end of the string, he affixed the five feet of tape. With this approach, he could drop the suspended egg from only a few feet off the ground with the string/tape. It was successful. Because Jamie succeeded in only one attempt, he was declared the winner. Adam protested, but as this was a contest of ingenuity, Jamie remained the winner.
Challenge 5: Who possessed the higher threshold of pain was determined in a paintball standoff.	Jamie	The MythBusters needed to shoot each other, then after one shot, they needed to take a step closer and shoot again.: The first volley: Jamie hit Adam's navel; Adam hit Jamie in the thigh.; The second volley: Jamie shot Adam, once again hitting his navel. Adam hit Jamie in his protective cup.; The third volley: Jamie, for a perfect record, hit Adam again in the navel. Adam hit Jamie in the upper chest. Adam then forfeited.
Final challenge 6: The MythBusters episode quiz	Jamie	Adam and Jamie quizzed each other regarding the events during some of the previous episodes. Adam had four and a half questions correct. Jamie won with five correct answers.
Scores	Adam: 1; Jamie: 4	
Winner	Jamie	

== Episode 25 – "Brown Note" ==
- Original air date: February 16, 2005

=== Blown Away ===
Someone who is shot and thrown backward a significant distance is a staple Hollywood visual effect. This was revisited in "MythBusters Revisited".

Myth statement	Status	Notes
A person will be propelled violently backwards if hit by a bullet.	Busted	A bullet fired by a gun cannot hold enough momentum. According to Newton's third law, if the bullet were to knock the target 20 ft (6 m) back, an equal amount of force would be applied in the direction of the gun—effectively knocking the shooter back about the same distance.

=== Brown Note ===
Myth statement	Status	Notes
An infrasonic "brown note" can cause humans to lose control of their bowels.	Busted	Even after testing a wide range of subaudible and near-subaudible noises on him, not once did Adam lose control of his bowels. Some discomfort was reported, however, due to the effects of low-frequency sound on the lungs.

=== Chinese Water Torture ===
Myth statement	Status	Notes
Chinese water torture can cause one to become insane.	Confirmed	The required torture equipment (and movement restrictions) is highly effective even without adding the discomfort of the water drip. The water drip itself, without the equipment, is almost negligible.

== Episode 26 – "Salsa Escape" ==
- Original air date: February 23, 2005

=== Salsa Escape ===
Myth statement	Status	Notes
Salsa was used by a prisoner to corrode the window bars of his cell and escape.	Plausible	Given several years, it would be possible, due to the corrosive elements of the salsa. The use of electrolysis via a direct current source (a radio power supply) in conjunction with the salsa greatly accelerated the effect, as it drew the electrons out of the bars and into the wires. Adam's alternating current setup had no success whatsoever, since the electrolysis worked to both add and subtract metal from the bars, and caused a good deal of the "cooked" salsa to cake onto the bars.
A urine-soaked silk shirt is strong enough to bend the bars of a prison cell when wrapped around them and twisted, as depicted in the film Shanghai Noon.	Busted	Adam tested this myth after he gave up on his salsa/alternating current escape plan. The bars proved too strong for the wet silk, tearing the fabric apart instead of bending the bars.

=== Cement Mix-Up ===
Initially, the team intended to test only the scenario of explosives being used to clean a relatively thin layer of concrete from the inside of a truck. Due to a mishap when the truck was being collected, however, it was filled almost to the top with concrete, rather than just with the thin layer that the team wanted. Adam therefore suggested splitting this myth into two sub-myths: the original one of cleaning a thin layer out of a truck (for which the team had to obtain a second truck), and another one involving a driver using explosives in what would presumably be a desperate attempt to remove a massive solidified slab of concrete from the truck.

Myth statement	Status	Notes
A stick of dynamite can clean the leftover scraps of concrete from the inside of a cement truck.	Plausible	A powder charge equivalent to 1.5 sticks of dynamite worked well and loosened or dislodged a lot of the dried excess concrete without noticeably damaging the barrel.
A stick of dynamite can remove a slab of concrete from the inside of a cement truck.	Busted	A solid slab of concrete is too hard to remove practically, and it is tougher than the barrel itself. The MythBusters enlisted the aid of FBI explosive experts (in particular Frank Doyle, making the first of many appearances on the show) to load the truck and barrel with 850 lb (386 kg) of ANFO. The resulting explosion reduced the truck to numerous very small fragments and a few larger pieces; the observers had to stand a mile away from the explosion. Billed as the biggest-ever explosion on the show to date (a record later surpassed by the homemade diamonds investigations), Jamie admitted, "This has got nothing to do with the myth; it's just a big boom". In the special "Shop Till You Drop", a large chunk of the barrel containing most of the concrete slab was shown in a junkyard. In the MythBusters episode on "Location, Location, Location" (2011), it was mentioned that this explosion was done only after the episode was supposed to be aired, and the producers decided something was missing.

== Episode 27 – "Exploding Port-a-Potty" ==
- Original air date: March 2, 2005

=== Exploding Port-a-Potty ===
Myth statement	Status	Notes
Lighting a cigarette in a port-a-potty filled with methane gas will cause an explosion.	Busted	Not enough gas is produced by the decomposing waste in the port-a-potty for it to possibly be flammable. A person would need to be in a tightly sealed port-a-potty filled with thick methane gas for it to be flammable. By the time the gas was thick enough in the air to become flammable, the person would have long-since passed out from asphyxiation. Larger amounts of decomposing waste can produce more gas, and sewer gas explosions are a known safety hazard.

See also Exploding Toilet.

=== Driveshaft Pole Vault ===
Myth statement	Status	Notes
A broken driveshaft dragging on the ground can cause a car to pole-vault end-over-end if it strikes a pothole.	Busted	A car cannot be made to go end-over-end by striking a pothole with the driveshaft. The back end of the car can be lifted, but the likelihood of an event like this happening is extremely improbable. More likely is that the driveshaft would be forced into the trunk.

== Episode 28 – "Is Yawning Contagious?" ==
- Original air date: March 9, 2005

This was the final episode in which the Build Team worked from their M6 workshop.

=== Toy Car Race ===
Myth statement	Status	Notes
Over a quarter-mile-long downhill course, a toy car can beat a full-sized Dodge Viper powered only by gravity.	Partly busted	A typical toy car, when tested on a real car tire, managed to stay on until the tire reached about 70 mph (110 km/h). After experimenting with various die-cast model cars, the two MythBusters each made their own toy car with which to experiment. Adam's toy car proved too unstable to stay on the full course. Jamie's toy car was able to beat the Dodge Viper (the real car) over 100 ft (30 m), but over the full length of the course, the Viper won by an extremely wide margin.

=== Is Yawning Contagious? ===
Myth statement	Status	Notes
A person can be subconsciously influenced into yawning if another nearby person yawns.	Confirmed	A first experiment conducted by the Build Team, constituting ten people going through three separate tests (a control one, one involving the reading of a tax law, and one involving Scottie yawning near the subjects), produced yawns from several people only during the tax law test and was deemed to have too small of a sample. In a second test pool of 50 people where only the influence of Kari's yawn was used, those who were influenced into yawning (by her) yawned 29% of the time. However, those who were not influenced yawned only 25% of the time. It seems that the MythBusters also found the average time to yawn for those who did yawn was 9 minutes for those who had been influenced and 9.6 minutes for those who had not. This was enough for the MythBusters to give the "confirmed" rating, although there was the 4% difference between the experimental and control groups, which was not large enough to constitute a statistically significant difference (at alpha = 0.05).

=== Toast – Butter Side Up or Down? ===
Myth statement	Status	Notes
Toast is more likely to land buttered-side down when dropped.	Busted	In an extensive and highly objective test, the toast showed no statistical preference for landing buttered-side down or up when dropped. It was an even 50–50 split when the final results were compared. However, when pushed off the side of a table, toast showed a tendency to flip once and land buttered-side down, which is likely the source of the myth. Adam also remarked that the results of this test were, by observation, less dependent on the actual butter itself, and were inherent from the process of buttering the toast instead; compressing the toast by applying the butter to the side of a piece of toast causes that side to become concave and encounter more air friction on that side, thus, much like a leaf, causing it to flip and land buttered-side up.

== Episode SP3 – "MythBusters Outtakes" ==
- Original air date: March 16, 2005

In this episode, outtakes and other deleted scenes were shown, which included some failed experiments or extra experiments that had to be trimmed out of the show for time and relevancy reasons. Clips edited out of shows previously aired include:

- "Breakstep Bridge revisit", the short revisit of the original myth. The revisit originally aired on "Myths Revisited", but it was cut from the US version.
- Ping-Pong Salvage, in which a sea otter managed to interfere with the experiment by stealing a ping-pong ball from the Mythtanic II.
- Plywood Builder, where Jamie had trouble with working with the zip line and Christine flat out refused to do the zip line.
- Chinese Water Torture, where Tory and Scottie each had a turn on the torture rack—Scottie with a blindfold and head restraint, and Tory with a head restraint, shackles, and a stream of iced water. In the aired version of this myth, Kari and Adam went "under the drip", and it was found that Chinese water torture is extremely effective—Adam completed his turn without incident (but was not restrained in any way), while Kari, who was restrained, requested that her turn be cut short when she began to suffer an emotional breakdown.
- Buried Alive, where Adam and a producer each tried the experiment. Neither was able to match Jamie's time in the coffin.
- Cement Mix-Up, where Tory tried to remove concrete from Twister I with a jackhammer, and only barely filled the bottom of the bucket after an hour of work.
- Needle in a Haystack, where Adam, before settling on the Needlefinder 2000, considered using a sieve, a metal detector, and a bloodhound to find the needles.
- Escape From Alcatraz, where the MythBusters theorized that the escapees used the tides to go to a different location. The makeshift raft crafted and crewed by the MythBusters team successfully made it across the bay and made it to the Marin Headlands. They declared the myth plausible because the fate of the prisoners remains unknown. A portion of the scale tests (cut for time but later shown here) also shows that belongings of the prisoners' found in the bay afterwards could have been released by the prisoners and washed up where they were found through strategic use of the bay's tides to throw the authorities off their trail. Adam and Jamie explored the idea that the escape raft washed ashore on Angel Island after making it to the Marin Headlands as a way to throw the FBI off the convicts' trail. Using a scale model of the San Francisco Bay area, the tide could have washed the raft onto Angel Island if released from the Marin Headlands, but as with their theory of how the escape could have succeeded, no concrete evidence existed to prove or disprove the theory.
- Carried Away, in which the Build Team used a pressure chamber to determine the height above sea level at which party balloons would pop. The balloons burst at an altitude between 23,000 and 25,000 ft (7,000 and 7,600 m).
- Eelskin Wallet, in which Adam and Jamie tested neodymium magnets to see whether they had the desired effect. The data were successfully erased in just one swipe. This segment was left out due to them not being able to properly assess the power of the magnets. The magnetometer used in testing the strengths of the other items ceased functioning when a neodymium magnet was held near it.
- Bug Bomb, in which Adam and Jamie tested whether sawdust, flour, straw, or fake smoke could have also caused an explosion if a spark was nearby. None of the materials tested could fully ignite, though sawdust and flour did burn slightly, and reports of flour and saw mill explosions have been confirmed.
- Elevator of Death, in which the elevator expert answered questions on whether pressing elevator buttons can make the elevator move faster, whether someone can be decapitated by a closing elevator door, and whether zero gravity can be attained by jumping in an elevator. All three questions were answered in the negative.

Six of the deleted segments, titled as the "Lost Experiments", are available on the Discovery Channel website.

Original myths that were completely edited out include:

Myth statement	Status	Notes
Free Energy – It is possible to get free (stolen) energy by using a coil of baling wire positioned under a power line.	Partly plausible	For this myth, the MythBusters created a large coil of wire and wrapped it around a PVC pipe box. They then hoisted it underneath power lines to "catch" some electricity. They were able to obtain about eight millivolts of electricity. They determined that siphoning a practically useful amount of electricity in such a manner would require thousands of pounds of wire and would be extremely impractical and dangerous, as well as being illegal.
Cola Myths – Cola can be used as a toilet cleaner.	Busted	For this myth, Adam dirtied M5's bathroom with engine oil in preparation for the cleanup. Jamie was greatly upset at this, but Adam assured him he would be able to clean it. The cola did nothing to the grease; in fact, even if it did, Adam noted he would have to clean up the cola afterwards, making the job more tedious than it was. Normal bathroom cleaner managed to clean up the grease.
Exploding Tattoos – A radio transmitter can cause tattoos to explode.	Busted	The MythBusters built a small, low-power transmitter, as a real one was too dangerous. They used two containers, one with water (control) and one with tattoo ink. They activated the transmitter, which managed to interfere with a radio in the workshop, and left it running. At the end of the test, the temperatures of both liquids were almost the same. The tattoo ink was only half a degree warmer.
Peeing on the Third Rail – A train can be derailed if coins are placed on the rails.	Busted	The train simply heated and flattened the pennies. Quoting narrator Robert Lee, "The myth wasn't busted—it was flattened." Even the train conductor assessed that a train cannot be derailed by a penny, unless the penny "was lodged in the engineer's eye".

== Episode 29 – "Cooling a Six-Pack" ==
- Original air date: March 23, 2005

From this episode, the Build Team operates from their new M7 workshop.

Also featured in this episode is the first test of Buster 2.0, built during the Buster special, as well as the final test of "Earl the MythBusters Caddy," which was dropped from a crane to fulfill a promise to its previous owner that it would be destroyed on the show.

While preparing Earl to be dropped from the crane, Scottie encountered a problem in that the rear windows needed to be opened to loop a chain through the passenger compartment, but the mechanism was jammed. She therefore took the chance to test out a mini-myth:

Myth statement	Status	Notes
It is possible to use a broken spark plug to smash a car's window.	Confirmed	Scottie had no success breaking the window and deemed the myth to be busted. Adam then tried with more force and the largest spark plug fragment he could find, and this time, he successfully broke the window.

=== Cooling a Six-Pack ===
Myth statement	Status	Notes
A six-pack of beer can be rapidly cooled by burying it in sand, pouring gasoline on top of it, and lighting the gasoline.	Busted	The fire did not significantly alter the temperature of the beer; in fact, the fire actually raised the temperature slightly (not to mention that burying the beer made the cans sandy, and the gasoline is harmful to the environment). With this myth quickly busted, Adam and Jamie each tried to build devices that could rapidly cool a six-pack, but neither device was effective enough. A carbon dioxide fire extinguisher, however, was able to cool a six-pack to a satisfactory temperature in about three minutes. In terms of practicality, though, one's best bet is to use icy salt water, which cooled the beer to an ideal temperature in 5 minutes. Barring that, normal ice water was next-fastest at 15 minutes. The other methods tested (the freezer, ice only, and the refrigerator) did not cool the beer rapidly enough to warrant their use in a spur-of-the-moment event.

Initial measurements:
Ice and water	Ice, water, and salt
33 °F (1 °C)	24 °F (−4 °C)

Results (after 5 minutes):
Ice	Ice and water	Ice, water, and salt	Freezer	Fridge
57 °F (14 °C)	44 °F (7 °C)	35.9 °F (2.2 °C)	55 °F (13 °C)	60 °F (16 °C)

Final results:
Ice, water, and salt	Ice and water	Freezer	Ice	Fridge
5 minutes	15 minutes	25 minutes	30 minutes	40+ minutes

=== Baghdad Battery ===
The Build Team created several copies of the Baghdad Battery, an archaeological find that has led some non-archaeologists to suggest that ancient Babylonians were the first to use batteries.

The ancient people of Babylon created a crude battery for use in...

Myth statement	Status	Notes
...electroplating.	Plausible	An overnight plating of zinc over copper seemed to work very well.
...acupuncture therapy.	Plausible	The electricity from the batteries was felt through the acupuncture needles, though the needles eventually grew hot, causing the Build Team to theorize this technique also being used as a form of torture.
...testing spiritual resolve.	Plausible	While the ancient batteries were not used on the recreation Ark of the Covenant due to their weak charge (about a third of a volt each, or almost 4 volts for a set of 10), Adam theorized that, if any charge were felt with the batteries, the ancient people would believe it to be of divine origin due to their lack of knowledge about electricity. Instead of the batteries, the Build Team wired the ark to the electric source used in the myth Peeing on the Electric Fence (something Adam suspected all along), surprising him with a nasty shock. (They later apologized to him, seeing how painful and potentially dangerous it was.)

== Episode 30 – "Son of a Gun" ==
- Original air date: March 30, 2005

This episode marks the final appearance of Mythtern Christine Chamberlain.

=== Son of a Gun ===
Myth statement	Status	Notes
A bullet that struck the groin of a soldier in the American Civil War led to the impregnation of a woman who was struck by the same bullet after it exited the soldier's body.	Busted	A Civil War-era bullet was fired through a pouch containing spermatozoa and into ballistic gel representing the woman's abdomen; no living spermatozoa were subsequently found in the gel. In addition, it was well documented that anyone suffering an abdominal gunshot wound was unlikely to survive.

=== Phone in a Thunderstorm ===
Myth statement	Status	Notes
A person can be electrocuted by talking on the phone during a lightning storm.	Confirmed	Adam and Jamie placed a ballistics gel dummy named Chip on a chair and put a telephone receiver on his ear. They activated a machine that was able to shoot more than 200,000 volts of electricity towards a mock-up hut. The electricity shot from the mouthpiece of the phone into Chip's mouth, and it set off the gunpowder charge that Jamie taped to the phone receiver as a signal. An ammeter wired up to the test rig blew a fuse.
A person can be electrocuted by using the shower during a lightning storm.	Plausible	Chip was not hit. A small fire did occur, however, and the ammeter again blew a fuse.

=== Trailer Troubles ===
Myth statement	Status	Notes
A boat can be driven with its trailer still attached.	Confirmed	Kari and Scottie, with help from the others, showed that a Boston Whaler can still be driven with the trailer still attached but with a great loss in maximum speed. A trailer shop owner said on the show that he once had to deliver a boat and trailer to a customer in such a manner, as the only access to the customer's boat ramp was from the water.

== Episode SP4 – "Shop 'til You Drop" ==
- Original air date: April 6, 2005

This episode explored some of the MythBusters' favorite stores and vendors they use when buying supplies for the show. The episode also included a tutorial on how to make ballistics gel by Adam and Kari (which is frequently used in the MythBusters' experiments), and it revealed the source of the often referenced "Little Black Book", the Pocket Ref.

== Episode SP5 – "MythBusters Revealed" ==
- Original air date: April 27, 2005

This episode took a behind-the-scenes look at the show. It featured insights from and interviews with Adam, Jamie, Kari, Tory, and producer Peter Rees about various aspects of MythBusters, as well as explored personal issues between the hosts.

== Episode SP6 – "Hollywood on Trial" ==
- Original air date: May 11, 2005

The MythBusters test some of the pervasive myths that are created by Hollywood, as well as recall some of their past Hollywood-inspired myths. This special also marks the debut of Grant Imahara as the third member of the Build Team, though the next two regular episodes ("Breaking Glass" and "Jet Pack") did show Scottie Chapman in that capacity instead.

Myth statement	Status	Notes
Bullets will spark when ricocheting off other objects.	Busted	After failing to create sparks when firing real bullets, the Build Team created sparking "bullets" out of paintballs filled with crushed sparklers. While these did create sparks, the myth was busted as these results could not be obtained with real bullets.
The aluminum paint used on actor Jack Haley while portraying the Tin Man in the 1939 movie version of The Wizard of Oz caused an adverse reaction that hospitalized him.	Busted	Kari survived her aluminum paint session just as Jamie and Adam survived their gold paint sessions when testing the Goldfinger myth. The myth is true but not as told. Actor Buddy Ebsen (better known later from The Beverly Hillbillies) was originally cast in the role of the Tin Man. Ebsen suffered a near-fatal allergic reaction and was hospitalized for two weeks after inhaling aluminum powder from an experimental aluminum makeup. After the aluminum makeup incident, Ebsen was replaced by actor Jack Haley and the makeup was replaced by an aluminum paint. Haley went on to complete his role as the Tin Man without suffering any serious health issues, except for one time when some paint got in his eye.
It is possible for a medium-to-large build man to break through a wooden door frame on his own power.	Plausible	Using only his shoulder, Jamie was able to break through three of the four locks installed on the door frame the Build Team constructed that met the American Building Code standards. The only reason the fourth lock did not break was that the Build Team used stronger screws to anchor it into the frame than what came with the actual lock. Adam attempted to break the fourth lock with a dropkick, but he slipped on a mat in front of the door and fell on his back, instead. Still, considering that Jamie got so far by simply shoulder-ramming, a determined individual could easily break through.
It is possible to be thrown through a glass window and walk away without a scratch, just like in Hollywood movies.	Partly busted	While it is possible to fly through an 1/8-inch (3.2 mm) glass pane with few or no injuries, 1/4-inch (6.3 mm) glass is thick enough to inflict significant lacerations on a body, should one be thrown through it. In Hollywood, a breakaway faux-glass substance called sugar glass is used in stunts requiring an actor to be thrown through a window. Sugar glass does not fracture into sharp fragments like real glass and does not injure stunt performers.
It is possible to ignite a pool of gasoline using only a cigarette.	Partly plausible	A cigarette has the potential to light a pool of gasoline but just does not have enough sustained heat. Gas ignites between 500 °F (260 °C) and 540 °F (280 °C). The cigarette at its hottest was between 450 °F (230 °C) and 500 °F, but only when it was actually being smoked. An ignition is very improbable.

== Episode 31 – "Breaking Glass" ==
- Original air date: May 18, 2005

=== Can a Singer Break Glass? ===
Adam and Jamie investigate whether a human voice could shatter glass, as perpetuated in stories of opera singers and demonstrated by Ella Fitzgerald in a commercial for Memorex and Jim Gillette in the music video for Nitro's "Freight Train".

Myth statement	Status	Notes
A wine glass shatters if a person sings at the right pitch.	Confirmed	Using lead crystal glasses, Adam proved the Memorex part of the myth by breaking a glass with his amplified voice. Rock singer Jaime Vendera was then able to break a glass by using his unaided voice, confirming the entire myth.

=== Rolling Stone ===
The Build Team takes on another old adage and sees if it remains relevant in modern use. This became the longest MythBusters experiment on record—over six months long.

Myth statement	Status	Notes
A rolling stone can truly gather no moss.	Confirmed	A stone rolling down a natural hill can "gather moss" by collecting it from the ground, so a machine that would keep a stone rolling continuously was built to see if moss would grow under such conditions. After six months of rolling, no moss was found on the stone.

=== Shop-Vac Jet Engine ===
Myth statement	Status	Notes
A shop vacuum can act similarly to a jet engine if it is used to suck up gasoline.	Busted	Newer model vacuums have the air flow isolated from the motor; even if this were not the case, the only result would be a small fire. In his first solo venture, Tory took on the challenge of constructing a jet engine by using only vacuum cleaner parts and household items and did produce something with a hint of thrust, but Jamie pointed out in the conclusion that by definition, vacuum cleaners—because of how they work—are not good candidates for jet engines.

== Episode 32 – "Jet Pack" ==
- Original air date: June 9, 2005

This episode marks the final appearance of Scottie Chapman as a Build Team member.

=== Jet Pack ===
Myth statement	Status	Notes
A jet pack can be built from plans purchased off the Internet and limited funds.	Busted	A jet pack made by MythBusters The jet pack produced by the MythBusters was not powerful enough even to lift itself off the ground, and they had to cheat by going beyond their assigned budget to create it. The sum of its parts costs too much to allow the average person to build it on a budget, and the plans did not have enough details to give builders a clear example of what to build.

=== Pyramid Power ===
Myth statement	Status	Notes
Pyramid power can be harnessed for a variety of purposes around the home.	Busted	The Build Team constructed a series of pyramid frames using the precise measurements and dimensions required to "harness" pyramid power. Four tests were performed: keeping razor blades sharp, preventing food from spoiling (one test for milk, another for an apple), and preventing the decay of a flower. The apple test at first seemed to be working, but it was later discovered that a contaminated saw blade (used to halve the apple) may have given one half a higher microbial load than the other. A repeated test using sterile equipment yielded about the same decay rate for each half. Strangely, a similar test with "cube power" showed the fruit rotting at a faster rate than the other two tests. Following the verdict, Adam requested that he and the other MythBusters not test any more "oogie boogie myths." Despite this, MythBusters later featured the myth that plants have feelings in the 2006 season.

== Episode 33 – "Killer Brace Position" ==
- Original air date: June 22, 2005

=== Killer Brace Position ===
The MythBusters take on an airline conspiracy theory. The episode is notable for the introduction of the Simulaid family.

Myth statement	Status	Notes
The brace position was actually designed by the airline industry to kill people, rather than save them, during an airplane crash (to save money by paying off wrongful-death suits rather than continuous injury compensations).	Busted	The brace position protected the test subject (Buster) from serious and possibly fatal injuries. When the test subject was not braced, he received far more serious injuries. At the end of the test, the team risked their lives; everyone survived the drop. The chance of dying is greater due to smoke inhalation or immolation from burning debris—due to being immobilized by injury or being pinned down by debris. There is a grain of truth to this myth; the amount of money paid by airlines in wrongful-death suits is lower than the amount of money paid for injury compensation.

=== Cell Phones vs. Drunk Driving ===
Adam and Kari take on a contemporary issue in driving, one that has given conflicting scientific data. To do so, Adam and Kari perform a general-purpose road safety test three times (initially sober without a cellphone, then while talking to Jamie on a cell phone, and finally while slightly intoxicated but under the legal blood alcohol content limit of 0.08%) and compare the three results.

Myth statement	Status	Notes
Driving while talking on a cell phone is just as dangerous as driving while intoxicated.	Confirmed	Both Adam and Kari failed a general-purpose road safety test both while talking on a cell phone and while driving after drinking alcoholic beverages (though with a blood alcohol content just below 0.08% and not legally drunk). Cell phone driving failed by a wider margin. Adam commented that one can put away a cell phone if necessary but cannot simply become sober as needed.

== Episode 34 – "Bulletproof Water" ==
- Original air date: July 13, 2005

=== Bulletproof Water ===
The MythBusters take on a Hollywood action staple, where a hero dives into water to avoid being hit by bullets. An alternate scenario of this myth was retested in Guns Fired Underwater.

Myth statement	Status	Notes
Hiding underwater can stop a person from being hit by bullets.	Partly confirmed	All supersonic bullets tested (up to .50-caliber) disintegrated in less than 3 ft (90 cm) of water, but slower bullets, such as pistol rounds, need up to 8 ft (2.4 m) of water to slow to non-lethal speeds. Shotgun slugs require even more depth; the exact depth could not be determined because one of their tests broke the rig. However, as most water-bound shots are fired from an angle, less actual depth is needed to create the necessary separation.

=== 360° Swing Set ===
Myth statement	Status	Notes
It is possible to do a chain-straight 360° loop on a swingset.	Busted	Under one's own power, it is impossible to do a chain-straight 360° loop on a schoolyard swingset. With help of other pushers, it is possible, although highly difficult, to do a full circle without the chain being straight. A person would need a rocket strapped to himself or herself to do it. A dummy was set up in such a manner; the rocket was able to propel it in a chain-straight 360° loop, but the setup would be too dangerous with a real person.
It is possible to do a 360° loop on a rigid-arm swingset.	Partly confirmed	A seventh-generation circus performer confirmed the myth by doing a 360° loop while Tory, Kari, and Grant observed. The others were not able to do the loop, as it consumes a lot of energy (and can cause nausea to some).

== Episode SP7 – "Jaws Special" ==
- Original air date: July 17, 2005

As part of Discovery Channel's Shark Week (which Adam and Jamie hosted in 2005), the MythBusters test myths relating to the movie Jaws with the help of a "ShaRammer" designed to simulate the force of a great white shark. This is also the first MythBusters special to run for two hours rather than one. More recent reruns have tended to show a version edited down to one hour. The episode was also referred to as the "Shark Special" in the episode "22,000 Foot Fall".

The sequel, "Shark Week Special 2", aired in 2008.

Myth statement	Status	Notes
Sharks can be caught using a special piano wire (from a deleted scene in Jaws).	Busted	Piano wire does not have the tensile strength needed to be used as an adequate shark-catching line.

=== Exploding Scuba Tank ===
Myth statement	Status	Notes
If a pressurized scuba tank is shot, it will explode.	Busted	When the tank was punctured by a bullet, it simply decompressed quickly, causing it to fly around like a compressed-air rocket. The team was able to make a simulated shark explode in the end only by using explosives as catalyst for a more violent release of compressed air..

=== Shark Strength ===
Myth statement	Status	Notes
A great white shark can ram a dive cage with enough force to damage or destroy it.	Confirmed	The "ShaRammer" penetrated the cage with enough force to rip a significant part of it loose and carry it away on its body. The cage, a replica of the one used in the film, was completely destroyed.
A great white shark can ram a boat with enough force to punch a hole in it.	Confirmed	A great white shark has enough power to punch a hole in the side of a wooden boat under the right circumstances, but an example of this happening has never been documented.

==== Barrel Pull Down ====
Myth statement	Status	Notes
A great white shark can pull barrels under water.	Plausible	A shark's maximum striking force is great enough to pull the barrels under.
A great white shark can hold barrels under water.	Busted	The force a shark can generate in a continuous pull is insufficient to keep the barrels under water for a significant amount of time.

==== Boat Pull ====
Myth statement	Status	Notes
A great white shark can pull a boat backwards with great enough speed that waves break over the stern.	Busted	The shark cannot generate enough force.

=== Shark Punching ===
Myth statement	Status	Notes
Punching a shark in the nose, eyes, or gills will cause it to flee or at least back off briefly.	Plausible	The sharks punched both by a specially modified Buster and by Jamie were driven off briefly and were hesitant about making repeated approaches. Strikes to the gills were noted to be more effective than strikes to the nose.

=== Mini Myths ===
The mini shark myths, while related to Discovery Channel's Shark Week, are not related to the movie Jaws in particular. These are all included on the Jaws Special DVD, and some were included on Discovery's website.

==== Sharks Prefer Yellow? ====
This is also referred to as "Seeing Red."

Myth statement	Status	Notes
Sharks tend to be attracted to brighter colors such as yellow.	Plausible	When all the results were calculated, the sharks tested preferred to go for the "yum-yum yellow" bait bag before the other ones (red, blue, black, white, and silver). However, they did also go for the silver and black ones.

==== Drop in the Ocean ====
This is also referred to as "Bloody Taste Test" and "Drop of Blood in an Olympic-size Pool."

Myth statement	Status	Notes
Sharks can detect a single drop of blood dropped into a pool of water.	Busted	The sharks detected fish blood; however, they either did not detect human blood or did not care about it. Also, like with any scent, the sharks were not able to detect the blood until their noses came into contact with the blood particles, and the smell grew weaker as the blood got diluted by the water, meaning that a single drop of blood in a particular area of the pool would not be detectable by any shark that was not in that area and was not swimming right into the blood. However, the MythBusters used only lemon sharks. Great whites or bull sharks might have gotten different results.

==== Shark Skin = Sandpaper? ====
This is also referred to as "True Grit?"

Myth statement	Status	Notes
A shark's skin is rough enough to be used as sandpaper.	Confirmed	When compared to various grains of sandpaper, the sharkskin that Adam and Jamie acquired was comparable to very high-grain (400 to 600) sandpaper, and it can be used as such, even on a rotary sander.

==== "It was THIS BIG! I swear." ====
This is also referred to as "Rule of ... Fin."

Myth statement	Status	Notes
There is a rule of thumb a casual observer can use to adequately estimate the size of a shark.	Busted	Out of all the measurements taken of sharks of various species, only one (from nose tip to dorsal fin tip) could consistently be used to estimate the shark's size, and that requires knowledge of the specific shark species and an up-close measurement that would be too difficult and dangerous to be done by a casual observer.

==== Are Sharks Afraid of Their Own Image? ====
Myth statement	Status	Notes
Sharks are afraid of seeing their own image.	Busted	Jamie went underwater and held up a mirror, but sharks did not seem afraid. They then held up a photograph of a shark, and that also did not work.

== Episode 35 – "Border Slingshot" ==
- Original air date: July 27, 2005

This was the first episode in which the entire hour was devoted to testing a single myth.

Myth statement	Status	Notes
Illegal immigrants are being launched over the United States border by the means of a giant slingshot.	Busted	In addition to being unable to achieve the distance and accuracy reported, the device could not be constructed in such a way as to allow the quick assembly and disassembly required for the myth. In addition, the person being thrown would likely be killed on impact.

== Episode 36 – "Killer Tissue Box" ==
- Original air date: August 3, 2005

=== Killer Tissue Box ===
Myth statement	Status	Notes
A simple tissue box stored on the backboard of a car can move with sufficient force to kill a person during a crash.	Busted	Sharp objects or those with masses over 3 lb. (1.2 kg), such as a bowling ball, can be deadly if they fly forward during a crash. Lighter objects such as tissue boxes may cause injury but cannot kill.
A tissue box can stay intact during a crash.	Confirmed	This was revealed when they crashed the real car and Adam pointed out that the box was intact.

=== Splitting an Arrow ===
The Build Team takes on a myth stemming from the film The Adventures of Robin Hood, where the most famous stunt is one where an arrow was split in half, from nock to tip. The Build Team explores whether this was at all possible and also challenges fans at a medieval fair to duplicate this feat. This myth was retested in Splitting an Arrow.

Myth statement	Status	Notes
It is possible to split an arrow perfectly down the middle with a second arrow, like in the film The Adventures of Robin Hood.	Partly busted	While it is certainly possible to rear-end an arrow with another, only a fiberglass arrow can be split down the middle (known as telescoping in archery circles). With a wooden arrow, even under the most ideal conditions, the best one can do is a partial split along the grain of the wood, and even that is improbable. The Build Team clearly showed that the film's circumstances can be recreated using a hollow shaft, such as bamboo.

== Episode 37 – "Escape Slide Parachute" ==
- Original air date: August 10, 2005

=== Escape Slide Parachute ===
This myth was inspired by a scene from Indiana Jones and the Temple of Doom, where Indy (Harrison Ford), Willie Scott (Kate Capshaw), and Short Round (Ke Huy Quan) successfully evacuate a pilotless plane by using a life raft.

Myth statement	Status	Notes
It is possible to jump from an airplane and use an inflatable life raft to safely return to earth, as shown in the film.	Busted	Any attempt to use the raft failed due to the raft's tendency to invert itself and fall upside down. Though it fell at a relatively survivable speed once it did so, no human could have hoped to hang on; even when Buster was attached with ropes to the center of the raft by his arms, the inversion shock simply ripped them off. It was possible to specially rig the raft as a parachute and land with minimal injuries, but this would not be possible to perform while jumping from a disabled aircraft.
...Using an escape slide instead of the raft.	Busted	While it was shown that the slide could safely land Buster with no injuries, he had to be strapped in and there is no possible way to perform this from a disabled aircraft.
A person strapped into the rear flight attendant seat could survive the destruction of the aircraft in flight by having the surviving tail section slow his or her fall and absorb impact.	Plausible	While Adam and Jamie's attempt to recreate the incident resulted in Buster once again being heavily damaged, this "myth" was actually a test of a real incident. The flight attendant, Vesna Vulović, was severely injured in the incident but did survive. It was agreed that it was very improbable, but it could happen if circumstances were just right.

=== Exploding Hair Cream ===
Myth statement	Status	Notes
A number of Canadian Air Force pilots were explosively decapitated when their hair gel exploded in the oxygen-rich environment of the cockpit.	Busted	After the environment in an F-104 Starfighter cockpit was recreated, it took some effort to ignite the hair product. Even with extreme amounts of the product, the best result was a fire and/or small explosion, which came nowhere near decapitating the test head. It was confirmed that there have been a number of incidents in which small fires have occurred, but there are no recorded fatal injuries. It was noted that a fire in a pure oxygen environment killed the astronauts of Apollo 1.

== Episode 38 – "MythBusters Revisited" ==
- Original air date: October 12, 2005

This episode is the second episode where the MythBusters team focuses on retesting earlier myths, based on fan reaction (the first is "Myths Revisited"). Grant Imahara is also introduced in this episode.

=== Blown Away 2 ===
Myth statement	Status	Notes
A body struck by a bullet will be propelled violently backwards. (From Blown Away)	Re-busted	Even a .50-caliber bullet does not have the momentum to knock a person backwards. If it were possible, the shooter would be knocked backwards as well—as per Newton's third law.

=== Explosive Decompression ===
Myth statement	Status	Notes
Explosive decompression can occur when a bullet is fired through the fuselage of a pressurized airplane. (From Explosive Decompression)	Re-busted	The Build Team tested the effect of air rushing past an open bullet hole, and surmised that the suction (i.e., the reduction of external pressure) caused by this would still not be enough to cause an explosive decompression.

=== Who Gets Wetter? ===
Myth statement	Status	Notes
A person will end up drier running in the rain than walking. (From Who Gets Wetter?)	Confirmed	When the test was retried in actual rain, it was conclusively proven that the running test subject got less wet than the walking test subject. The use of artificial rain in the original test led to a false negative.

=== Plywood Builder ===
Myth statement	Status	Notes
Holding a large sheet of plywood will slow a fall from a building enough to make it survivable. (From Plywood Builder)	Re-busted	After the speed of updrafts was tested with a special rig on Tory's truck, it was proven that a person could not hold on to the piece of plywood if he or she were in free fall. A mere 45-mile-per-hour (72 km/h) gust knocked it out of Tory's hands; updrafts from skyscrapers reach upwards of 90 mph (140 km/h).

=== Biscuit Bazooka Spinoff ===
Myth statement	Status	Notes
A black car heats up faster than an identical white car. (Spinoff of Biscuit Bazooka)	Confirmed	A fan wrote in and asked a follow-up question: "Does the color of a car affect the way it heats up?" The MythBusters used two identical cars, one black and the other white, and left them both out in the summer heat with thermometers in both. By mid-afternoon, the white car had a temperature of 126 °F (52.2 °C), while the black car had heated up to a temperature of 135 °F (57.2 °C), about 9 degrees hotter on the Fahrenheit scale. The explanation was that black paint absorbs heat, while white paint reflects it.

=== AC vs. Windows Down ===
Myth statement	Status	Notes
Running a car with air conditioning on is more fuel efficient than running with the windows down. (From AC vs. Windows Down)	Partly re-busted/Partly confirmed	The fundamental flaw in the MythBusters' test was that the point where the drag becomes powerful enough to inhibit a car's performance with windows down was inside their 45–55 miles per hour (72–89 km/h) margin at 50 miles per hour (80 km/h). When the driver is going less than 50 mph, it is more efficient to leave the windows down, but when the driver is going greater than 50 mph, it is more efficient to use the AC.

=== Car Capers – Exploding Gas Tank ===
Myth statement	Status	Notes
A gas tank will explode when shot by a bullet. (From Car Capers – Shooting Cars)	Partly confirmed	It has already been proven that when shot by a normal bullet, a gasoline tank will not explode. However, if a gasoline tank is shot by a tracer round from a great enough distance so that the round can ignite with air friction, it will cause the gasoline to catch fire. By the time this happened, the tank was so riddled with bullets (from previous tracers that were fired too close to ignite), there was no contained pressure, but the MythBusters surmised that had the tank been properly enclosed, it might have exploded.

== Episode 39 – "Chinese Invasion Alarm" ==
- Original air date: October 19, 2005

=== Chinese Invasion Alarm ===
Myth statement	Status	Notes
The ancient Chinese were able to detect an invading army tunneling beneath the ground by using a drum submerged in a shaft.	Plausible	Kari was able to hear Jamie and Tory's digging in an underground mine shaft in two of the three tests. She actually detected them better by listening to the drum compared to Grant's use of modern geophone equipment.

=== Five-second Rule ===
Myth statement	Status	Notes
The five-second rule is valid when it comes to food dropped on the floor.	Busted	This myth yielded a varied number of results, but in the definitive test where the only variable was time, the myth was definitively busted. There was no real difference in the number of bacteria collected from two-second exposure compared to six-second exposure. Instead, the texture and moisture inherent to the food dropped dictated the number of bacteria collected.
The toilet seat is the cleanest place in the house.	Confirmed	Adam tested this myth just out of curiosity. When the results were compared to the bacteria samples from the "Five-second Rule" tests, the toilet seat actually proved cleaner than all other surfaces tested. This myth was explored further four seasons later in Hidden Nasties.
A dog's mouth is cleaner than a human's.	Plausible	The sample collected from Adam's mouth had much more bacterial growth than the sample collected from Lulu the dog. Jamie suggested, however, that the bacteria from the dog may be more potent.

== Episode 40 – "Confederate Rocket" ==
- Original air date: October 26, 2005

This was the second episode in which the entire hour was devoted to testing a single myth. Because the myth dealt with the making of explosive and/or dangerous materials, the ingredients used to make nitrous oxide and gun cotton were censored by substituting animal sounds for the chemical names. This myth was revisited in Salami Rocket.

Myth statement	Status	Notes
During the American Civil War, the Confederacy built and launched a two-stage rocket 120 miles (190 km) from Richmond, Virginia to Washington D.C.	Busted	While the MythBusters were able to construct and launch a hybrid rocket in under two days using only properties available to Civil War-era engineers, the rocket was not two-stage (as per the myth), and it travelled only an estimated 500 yards (460 m). Adam and Jamie agreed that the myth would be impossible with the technology available during the Civil War.

== Episode 41 – "Vodka Myths" ==
- Original air date: November 2, 2005

=== Compact Compact ===
Myth statement	Status	Notes
Two semi trucks that collided head-on welded together due to the accident. After the semis were towed as a whole to the junkyard, workers were shocked to discover that the semis trapped a European compact car and its doomed driver between each other.	Busted	After obtaining two free semi trucks, their trailers, and a sports car (a Fiat X1/9) from a fan, the MythBusters rigged up the two semis to crash. After several mishaps and numerous technical problems, they finally managed to crash the two trucks together. However, the trucks were slightly off line when they hit the car, pushing the Fiat out of the center of the wreck instead of crushing it altogether. The trucks did not fuse together, but they became instead a huge mass of wreckage. The Fiat, despite not receiving the full force of the hit, was totaled, as well. This myth was revisited in the 2009 season, when the MythBusters successfully completed the experiment and re-busted the myth.

=== Vodka Myths I ===
Vodka can...

Myth statement	Status	Notes
...clean the odor off feet.	Confirmed	Comparison of a commercial foot powder wash vs. a vodka wash showed that the odor was eliminated on both feet.
...kill bad breath.	Confirmed	After a mixture of 8 US fluid ounces (240 ml) of vodka and 4.5 US fluid ounces (130 ml) of cinnamon powder was left to sit for two weeks in a sealed flask and then strained, it managed to eliminate most odors on par with an over-the-counter mouthwash. The only bad breath smell not eliminated (by either the vodka or the mouthwash) was from smoking cigarettes.

== Episode 42 – "Steel Toe-Cap Amputation" ==
- Original air date: November 9, 2005

=== Steel Toe-Cap Amputation ===
Myth statement	Status	Notes
Steel-toe boots are more dangerous to one's toes than normal boots when a heavy weight is dropped on them. Whereas a normal boot would just crush the toes, a steel toe would curl and crumple in, cutting off the toes.	Busted	Using similar tests to those used to test steel-toe boot certification, Adam and Jamie determined that one's toes are much safer with steel-toe boots than without. There was no toe-cutting curling of the steel toe, and even using a blade attachment did not work, only glancing off the steel toe to cut right above where it ended.

=== Bottle Rocket Blast-Off ===
The Build Team attempts to recreate this water bottle jetpack from a Japanese game show.

Myth statement	Status	Notes
According to a Japanese trivia game show, it is possible to use fifteen 3-litre water bottle rockets to launch a human 40 m.	Busted	While bottle rockets, on their own, could launch 1/15 of Kari's weight a fair distance, their combination into one super-rocket system did not have enough thrust to give the crash test dummy the trajectory or distance stated by the television show, and it was considered too dangerous by paramedics to feasibly launch a human being. More bottle rockets proved only to add to the difficulty and complications. The Build Team also found that water cooler jugs, while able to launch higher at the standard air/water ratio for water bottle rockets, were weaker than standard soda bottles (which are designed to hold carbonated liquids), failing at around 60 psi (413 kPa) less than the soda bottles (90 psi (600 kPa) as opposed to 150 psi (1,000 kPa)).

== Episode 43 – "Seasickness – Kill or Cure" ==
- Original air date: November 16, 2005

=== Seasickness – Kill or Cure? ===
Because Adam and Grant are very susceptible to motion sickness, they test non-pharmaceutical remedies for seasickness by...

Myth statement	Status	Notes
...using a cinnamon-flavored tongue spray.	Busted	The spray was not effective on Adam or Grant.
...using magnetized arm bands.	Busted	The arm bands were completely ineffective for both Adam and Grant. Some celebrities, such as Barry Manilow, claim they work, but they nonetheless do not operate on any valid scientific principles.
...taking a ginger pill.	Plausible	Both Adam and Grant endured the spin-chair for 20–30 minutes without experiencing any symptoms, but they decided the myth could not be confirmed, as seasickness is "very individual" and depends on the person.
...using an electro-shock wristband.	Busted	The shocks mildly discomforted Adam and Grant, who nonetheless became sick.
...using a placebo, such as a vitamin or a sugar pill.	Plausible	While Adam was not affected by the placebo, Grant was successfully tricked into thinking he had taken a store-bought seasickness medication and did not throw up. He had taken vitamin B_{12} and claimed it was the most effective remedy. By falling for the placebo, all his test results had to be thrown out on the grounds of psychosomatic influence.

=== Tailgate Up vs. Tailgate Down ===
This was revisited in "More Myths Revisited".

Myth statement	Status	Notes
It is more fuel efficient to drive a pickup truck with its tailgate down, rather than up.	Busted	Driving with the tailgate down actually increased drag on the pickup and caused it to consume fuel faster than the identical truck driven with the tailgate up. The closed tailgate was later shown to have created a locked vortex flow that created a smoother flow of air over the truck. With the tailgate down, the trapped vortex was dissipated and the drag increased.

=== Finger in a Barrel ===
The Build Team takes on a myth that forms a staple of cartoon physics. This was revisited in "More Myths Revisited".

Myth statement	Status	Notes
A shotgun plugged by a human finger will backfire and explode, injuring or killing the shooter instead of the intended victim.	Busted	Both test hands (composed of ballistics gel of varying firmness) were obliterated by the shotgun blast. Neither had the volume or strength needed to plug the barrel to create enough pressure to cause it to explode. Even under ridiculous circumstances such as having the barrel clogged with soil, being sealed off by a 4-inch (10 cm) spike welded into the barrel, and being blocked by a simulated squib load, the gun still did not explode. The best results seen were minor deformations in the gun barrel.
