= Brown sound =

Brown sound may refer to:

- Brown noise or Brownian noise, a random signal
- Brown note, a hypothetical sound wave that would cause involuntary defecation
- Dave Baksh (born 1980), a guitarist known as "Brownsound"
- The Brown Noise, the final episode of the third season of South Park
- Brown sound, a guitar sound style of Eddie Van Halen
