= Brown noise (disambiguation) =

Brown noise may refer to:

- Brownian noise, signal noise with a 1/f^{2} power spectrum
- Brown note, a tone at a certain frequency said to cause loss of bowel control
- "World Wide Recorder Concert", also known as "The Brown Noise", an episode of South Park
