= MythBusters (2003 season) =

- No. of episodes: 8

Release
- Original network: Discovery Channel
- Original release: September 23 – December 12, 2003

Season chronology
- ← Previous; Pilot episodes Next → 2004 season

The cast of the television series MythBusters perform experiments to verify or debunk urban legends, old wives' tales, and the like. This is a list of the various myths tested on the show as well as the results of the experiments (the myth is busted, plausible, or confirmed).

The show's first season used "True" instead of "Confirmed"; for the sake of consistency, "Confirmed" will be used on this page.

== Episode overview ==
No. overall	No. in season	Title	Original release date
4	1	"Exploding Toilet"	September 23, 2003
Myths tested: Can a person be propelled off a toilet seat by dropping a lit cigarette into a toilet bowl when filled with various combustible materials? Is running better than walking to keep dry in the rain? Is it possible to make a "magic bullet" out of ice?
5	2	"Cell Phone Destroys Gas Station"	October 3, 2003
Myths tested: Will using a cell phone near a gas pump cause an explosion? Will silicone breast implants explode or expand in low pressure? Can a standard CD-ROM drive shatter a CD?
6	3	"Barrel of Bricks"	October 10, 2003
Myths tested: Can a bricklayer hoisting a wooden barrel full of bricks with a pulley from the top of a three-story building fall and hit a man multiple times? Can a person be electrocuted by urinating on the third rail? Can an eel skin wallet erase a credit card?
7	4	"Penny Drop"	October 17, 2003
Myths tested: Will a penny dropped from the top of the Empire State Building kill a person or penetrate the ground? Can a person's internal organs be cooked by a tanning booth? Can tooth fillings receive radio waves?
8	5	"Buried Alive"	October 24, 2003
Myths tested: How long can you survive in an underground coffin? Does Cola have special properties? If a person is falling off a bridge, can they save themselves by throwing a hammer ahead of them to break the surface tension of the water prior to their own impact?
9	6	"Lightning Strikes/Tongue Piercings"	November 11, 2003
Myths tested: Is a person with a tongue piercing more likely to get struck by lightning? Can a cannon be built out of a tree? Can the breathalyzer be beaten through various methods?
10	7	"Stinky Car"	December 5, 2003
Myths tested: Can a car in which a person has died and started to decay become so malodorous that it will be impossible to remove the stench and sell? If gasoline is poured down a drain pipe and lit while a person is inside of it, will that person be launched as if from a cannon?
11	8	"Alcatraz Escape"	December 12, 2003
Myths tested: Was it possible to survive an escape from Alcatraz? Does a duck's quack echo? Does the government implant secret chips in people which stud finders can detect?

== Episode 1 – "Exploding Toilet" ==
- Original air date: September 23, 2003

=== Exploding Toilet ===
This experiment formally introduced Buster the crash test dummy.

Myth statement	Status	Notes
Pouring gasoline down a toilet and lighting it will cause the toilet to explode.	Busted	The gasoline simply burned without exploding. Even half a tin of gunpowder in the toilet bowl was not able to eject Buster from the seat, though his clothes did smolder.

=== Who Gets Wetter? ===
Myth statement	Status	Notes
A person will end up drier by running in the rain rather than walking.	Busted	Adam and Jamie decided to wear coveralls through 2 to 3 inches (5.1 to 7.6 cm) per hour of artificial rain and compare walking and running weights to determine which absorbed more water (with bodysuits underneath to remove sweat absorption as a variable). The original test showed that running faster results in getting wetter, with wind only adding minimal amounts of water. The independent tests of Thomas Peterson and Trevor Wallace of the National Climatic Data Center disagreed, finding the runner 40% less wet. The result of this myth was overturned in "MythBusters Revisited".

=== Magic Bullet ===
This myth tested the feasibility of magic bullets that can be used to assassinate without leaving evidence, used as a plot device or otherwise mentioned in many movies, such as Most Wanted and Three Days of the Condor. A request for information to the Central Intelligence Agency was declined. Due to the myth's inclusion in many Kennedy assassination conspiracy theories, Adam and Jamie chose to use a Carcano rifle similar to the assassination weapon for testing.

Myth statement	Status	Notes
An ice bullet can kill someone without leaving a trace.	Busted	The ice bullet evaporated before it could leave the barrel. This myth was retested in "Myths Revisited", and it remained busted with slow-frozen ice.
A meat bullet can kill someone without leaving a trace.	Busted	The hamburger bullet fragmented on contact with the skin, causing only superficial damage.
A gelatin bullet can kill someone without leaving a trace.	Busted	The bullet did not cause fatal injury from the 6.5×52mm Carcano round, but it had a better result from a revolver at point-blank range. Desiring a more subtle assassination tool, Adam and Jamie examined the Bulgarian umbrella.
An assassin can use a poison capsule fired from an umbrella to kill someone without leaving a trace.	Confirmed	This was found to have been the cause of death of a notable Bulgarian journalist in exile, Georgi Markov. The MythBusters built a pair of replicas with a gas cylinder and an air gun, and fired both to lethal effect without leaving gunpowder burns.

== Episode 2 – "Cell Phone Destroys Gas Station" ==
- Original air date: October 3, 2003

=== Cell Phone Destruction ===
This myth was inspired by e-mails leading to some gas stations discouraging cell phone use during refueling, and also because at the time of the episode, there were 150 gas station fires annually in America.

This is also known as the myth that birthed two memorable MythBusters one-liners—Jamie's "Jamie wants big boom" and Adam's "Am I missing an eyebrow?"

Myth statement	Status	Notes
Using one's cell phone while pumping gasoline can cause an explosion.	Busted	For the initial test at the Stoke Gas & Memorabilia Town in Santa Rosa, Jamie and Adam rigged a cell phone inside a Lexan blast chamber that would be filled with flammable fuel vapor. Also inside, to test a secondary theory—static electricity—they came up with a "panty-static generator" that rubbed a pair of panties on a fur-covered car seat (simulating a woman getting into and out of a car—something they decided on since they did a stakeout and found women are six times more likely to re-enter their cars while refueling) and transferred the static electricity to a Leyden jar. However, the first test was a failure on both counts, so the MythBusters scaled back down to find the right mixture. It was during one of these tests that confirmed that static electricity combined with a potent fuel-air mixture could cause an explosion that Adam singed off his eyebrow—and, according to Jamie, a chunk of his hair. With renewed vigor and knowledge of proper fuel-air mixtures, Adam and Jamie returned to the Stoke Gas Museum, but they found that neither the cell phone nor the panty-static generator caused explosions even with large amounts of the ideal fuel-air mixture inside the chamber, thus busting the myth. Adam and Jamie did finally get an explosion when they added a neon transformer to the chamber, which blew the chamber into two halves and left the car seat on fire (Adam and Jamie had wired the chamber with a fail point so that it would be a safe failure and not cause shrapnel in case of a large explosion). Adam and Jamie found that the actual risk comes from an electrostatic discharge between a charged driver and the car, often a result of static electricity buildup from getting into and out of the vehicle, and re-busted the myth in "Myths Revisited".

=== Silicone Breasts ===
Myth statement	Status	Notes
Silicone breast implants may explode at high altitudes or low air pressure.	Busted	Using a hypobaric chamber, the implants expanded negligibly at 35,000 feet (11,000 m), an altitude too high for a human to survive for long periods. Using a hyperbaric chamber yielded no impact. A study by Duke University concluded that atmospheric conditions would be lethal long before they could affect implants. A spinoff of this myth was tested in "Myths Revisited", while the DVD version includes the second version of the spinoff.

=== Exploding CDs? ===
Myth statement	Status	Notes
Compact discs can shatter if placed in a high-speed (i.e., 40× or faster) optical disc drive.	Plausible	It was proven that a high rotation (in excess of 23,000 RPM) could shatter the CDs, but the MythBusters could not achieve this using an unaltered drive. Physically damaged and unbalanced CDs made shattering more likely. The MythBusters concluded that while this event was possible, it was very unlikely to happen.

== Episode 3 – "Barrel of Bricks" ==
- Original air date: October 10, 2003

=== Barrel of Bricks ===
Myth statement	Status	Notes
A bricklayer hoisting a wooden barrel full of bricks with a pulley from the top of a three-story building could be injured repeatedly.	Plausible	The MythBusters were able to injure Buster by hitting him with the descending barrel as it pulled him up, but the barrel would not break and spill its load until deliberately weakened by removing hoops (Note: To remove the hoops, hammers were used in a way which was examined in two later episodes: "Firearms Folklore" and "More Myths Revisited".) and dropping it on a sharp edge. This allowed Buster's weight to overcome the broken barrel and fall, while a quick-release mechanism in Buster's hand holding the rope allowed the barrel to be dropped a second time for the third impact. However, there was no evidence of the myth happening; the source of the myth appears to be a joke book. This test marks the first time Buster was broken in the course of an experiment.

=== Peeing on the Third Rail ===
Myth statement	Status	Notes
Urinating on the electric third rail of a train track can cause electrocution.	Busted	Since ballistic gelatin has the same electrical resistance as a human body, the MythBusters rigged a dummy with a urination valve and electric release that would trigger with exposure to current. Even wetting the feet and removing shoes failed to trigger the release, due to the urine stream failing to stay laminar and solid enough to complete a circuit. A larger valve failed to create a solid stream, but setting the dummy unrealistically close to the rail finally succeeded. A spinoff of this myth was tested in "Myths Revisited". In this episode, the "genitalia" region of the dummy is censored, and no reference is made verbally, instead referring only to the urination process.

While the MythBusters were testing the myth at a train yard, the yard's operators gave Adam permission to test a "mini-myth" with one of their engines:

Myth statement	Status	Notes
Placing a coin on a train track is sufficient to derail a train.	Busted	Adam placed four different types of coins on the track at the same time, but none of them had any noticeable effect on the engine. All that happened was that the coins were flattened and partially melted by the intense friction generated as the engine passed over them.

=== Eelskin Wallet ===
Myth statement	Status	Notes
Using an electric eel-skin wallet will cause a static charge that will cause failure in a magnetic stripe card.	Busted	Most eel-skin wallets are not made from electric eels but rather from a fish called a hagfish, which does not produce an electric charge. Data written to a set of test cards were not affected in any way from this leather exposure, nor were they affected by direct exposure to an eel in a tank. In addition, further tests were conducted to see how much magnetism it would take to "wipe" a card, and it was found to be about 1,000 gauss (0.1T), far above what the average person may encounter.

== Episode 4 – "Penny Drop" ==
- Original air date: October 17, 2003

=== Penny Drop ===
Myth statement	Status	Notes
A penny dropped from a skyscraper lands with enough force to either kill a pedestrian on the sidewalk below or embed itself into the sidewalk.	Busted	Firing a penny at terminal velocity (65 miles per hour (105 km/h)) into concrete and asphalt disks and a ballistics gel head with a human skull failed to result in any penetrations, likely because the speed is too low and a penny's mass is too small. Even when fired from a rifle, the penny was unable to penetrate concrete or a ballistic gel dummy's skull. In comparison, a real 6.5mm bullet split the dummy skull. Visiting the Empire State Building, the likely source of the myth, Adam and Jamie realized that updrafts and roofs of lower floors would prevent a thrown penny from reaching street level.

=== Radio Tooth Fillings ===
Myth statement	Status	Notes
It is possible to pick up radio signals through a dental filling.	Busted	The gold and amalgam tooth fillings did not act as an antenna or point-contact transistor when placed in a real human skull. Explanations for the supposed Morse code pickup included a Galvanic cell reaction between two tooth fillings and saliva. This myth was first claimed by Lucille Ball in an interview on The Dick Cavett Show, with the fillings explanation offered by Buster Keaton.

=== Microwave Madness ===
Despite mid-episode teasers, the MythBusters refused to microwave a live poodle, and they were thus unable to test the myth that a microwave can dry a wet dog.

Myth statement	Status	Notes
It is possible to cook one's insides by using a tanning bed too often, in a manner similar to how a microwave works.	Busted	Tanning booths work on ultraviolet radiation, which penetrates the body from the outside in, meaning that all one would get is a sunburn. The MythBusters also demonstrated that microwave ovens do not cook food from the inside out.
It is possible to blow up a microwave oven by microwaving metal.	Busted (with caveats)	Neither a spoon nor a fork had any effect. Tinfoil scrunched into balls caused a light show with electric charges, but the microwave did not explode. Microwaving metal can possibly ruin a microwave by arcing against the inner wall, sending electricity back to the magnetron, and either destroying it or shortening its lifespan.
If a microwaved glass of water has an additive placed in it, it can explode due to superheating.	Confirmed (with limit)	If the water had no impurities in it at the time of superheating (like distilled water), then any sort of additive placed within will make the water flash to steam and violently spray. However, this will not happen with water from common sources (like tap water).
It is possible to build a super-microwave by aligning four magnetrons around a metal box.	Busted (unofficially)	If there is a proper method to build one, the method used in the show is not it. After a glass of water was exposed to the "super microwave"'s magnetrons for thirty seconds, a thermometer found that the temperature of the water had actually dropped by two degrees Fahrenheit (1.1 °C).

== Episode 5 – "Buried Alive" ==
- Original air date: October 24, 2003

=== Buried Alive ===
Myth statement	Status	Notes
It is possible to stay alive over one day when one is buried alive in a coffin.	Busted	Jamie risked his own life for this myth, staying in the unburied coffin for 50 minutes; he maintained just 30 minutes when the soil was loaded above the casket. Suffocation from the lack of outside air or lethal poisoning from increasing levels of carbon dioxide would have claimed the life of anyone buried alive. Also, the coffin (and occupant) could possibly be crushed by the weight of the soil pressing down on it. The risk of sudden collapse was the main reason the test was aborted after only 30 minutes. After the coffin was uncovered, it was found to have buckled significantly.

=== 101 Uses For Cola ===
Cola is able to...

Myth statement	Status	Notes
...clean up blood.	Confirmed	Adam and Jamie designed a fake car collision scene and used animal blood. After two hours, Adam used soap and water in one area, while Jamie used cola in another. After rinsing both areas off, they noted while the cola was not really as effective, Jamie's area was cleaner than Adam's, leaving the myth confirmed.
...polish chrome.	Confirmed	Adam and Jamie proceeded to clean a dirty chrome car bumper. Adam used a leading commercial chrome polisher on one side, while Jamie used cola and aluminum foil on the other. In comparison, the cola side was surprisingly much cleaner than the chrome polisher side.
...loosen rusty bolts.	Busted	Adam soaked a rag in cola and then left it on the rusty bolt for 5 minutes. Adam tried to unscrew the bolt but to no avail. Jamie managed to free it, but he said that it was very difficult and that the cola did not really help.
...shine a penny.	Confirmed	Adam and Jamie placed a penny in cola and another in pure phosphoric acid, an ingredient used in cola but in low amounts. After 24 hours, the pennies were removed. The penny that was in the cola was considerably shinier, except for a spot where an air bubble had formed. Surprisingly, the penny that was in the phosphoric acid was not as shiny.
...erode a tooth.	Busted	Adam and Jamie placed a tooth in cola and another in pure phosphoric acid. After 24 hours, the teeth were removed. The tooth that was in the cola was merely stained brown, while the tooth that was in the phosphoric acid had been dissolved to half its original size.
...dissolve a steak.	Busted	Adam and Jamie placed a steak in cola and another in pure phosphoric acid. After 48 hours, the steaks were removed. The steak that was in the phosphoric acid had been reduced to little chunks, whereas the steak that was in the cola had been tenderized but not dissolved.
...clean battery terminals.	Confirmed	Adam cleaned one car battery with baking soda, while Jamie cleaned another with cola. Both were effective in removing the debris and rust, but Adam then cleaned a terminal with plain water. He pointed out that the only reason the cola may have worked was that it was a liquid, not because of its properties.
...remove greasy stains in laundry.	Busted	Adam and Jamie dirtied their jumpsuits in car grease. After cutting a piece of fabric from each jumpsuit, Adam soaked his in a commercial detergent, and Jamie soaked his in cola. After four days of soaking, they rinsed the pieces and noticed that neither did a good job at removing the stains and that the cola turned the material brown.
...degrease engines.	Busted	Adam and Jamie poured cola onto a dirty engine and let it sit for 10 minutes before rinsing it. While they noted that most of the dirt and rust had been successfully removed, most of the grease remained on the engine.
...ruin car paint.	Busted	Adam and Jamie applied cola to one section of a car and phosphoric acid to another. After letting it sit for 24 hours, they rinsed the areas. The area with the cola had not been affected, but the area with the phosphoric acid was considerably whiter and thinner.
...kill sperm.	Busted	The MythBusters added cola to some slides and saline solution to others, then counted the number of live sperm they could see through a microscope camera in one minute. The number of live sperm in both saline and cola was relatively the same; with the help of Dr. Turek, they determined that cola does not do much more than dilute the sperm.
...clean a bathroom.	Busted	This myth is shown only in "MythBusters Outtakes". Adam rubbed engine grease over surfaces in the M5 bathroom (much to Jamie's disgust). After successfully cleaning it with a commercial bathroom cleaner, he greased the bathroom again and had Jamie try to clean it with cola. The cola did not work at all, and Jamie forced Adam to clean the bathroom with the bathroom cleaner.

=== Hammer Bridge Drop ===
Myth statement	Status	Notes
A high fall over water can be survived by throwing a hammer ahead of oneself to break the surface tension.	Busted	Dropping Buster with an internal accelerometer from a crane led to difficulty because the dummy continually lost parts on each control impact. Eventually, the MythBusters managed consistent drops (mostly just below 300 g), finding that the hammer reduced the impact slightly, but the 150-foot (46 m) fall would still be deadly.

== Episode 6 – "Lightning Strikes/Tongue Piercings" ==
- Original air date: November 11, 2003

=== Lightning Strikes Tongue Piercing ===
This myth was inspired by 17-year-old Matthew Thomsen being hit by lightning near Denver in August 2003, which knocked his tongue piercing out of his mouth.

Myth statement	Status	Notes
Metal body piercings attract lightning.	Busted	The lightning did seem to strike the dummy with a piercing more but not the piercings directly. It would take a piercing the size of a doorknob to attract lightning. Given that the realistic piercings did not get struck, the myth was technically busted. Adam was also shown having his tongue pierced, but he did not keep the piercing after the test was concluded.

=== Tree Cannon ===
Myth statement	Status	Notes
Under siege from a neighboring clan, a medieval Hungarian town (Paks) built a cannon out of a tree overnight, but the cannon wiped out a great deal of itself when it exploded during a test-fire.	Plausible	It is impossible to bore a barrel out of a log in a single night by using the technology available at that time, and Adam eventually used a chainsaw and electric drill. The cannon made of a log, loaded with 6 ounces (170 g) of period-realistic gunpowder, successfully fired a 1-pound (450 g) hand-chiseled granite cannonball a huge distance (exact measurement unknown since the cannonball was never found, even after 9 years). It also successfully fired a tennis ball, though a soda can merely leaked and contaminated the gunpowder. Loaded with 5 pounds (2.3 kg) of gunpowder, and with its barrel plugged, the tree cannon exploded violently enough to feasibly destroy part of a small medieval town. Since the testing of this myth, Jamie still looks for the cannonball in the bushes around the runway every time he does a myth on the runway.

=== Beat the Breath Test ===
A BACtrack B70 breathalyzer owned and operated by the San Francisco Police Department Crime Lab was used to test Adam's and Jamie's blood alcohol levels to ensure they were intoxicated. They then experimented to see if it is possible to pass a field sobriety test despite being over the limit, by...

Myth statement	Status	Notes
...eating breath mints.	Busted	Adam's blood alcohol content simply dropped slightly by an amount that was in the testing machine's margin of error. The only way this is likely to help is by masking the scent of the alcohol in the hope that an officer will not carry out the sobriety test to begin with, and even then, it was pointed out that most tests are done either in response to erratic driving or at sobriety checkpoints, meaning that this would do nothing to prevent the test being performed.
...eating an onion.	Busted	Like Adam, Jamie experienced a blood alcohol content drop that was within the margin of error, and not enough to make it appear that he was under the limit. The scent of the onion was also so overwhelming that anyone using this tactic would likely get caught immediately.
...holding a battery in one's mouth during the test.	Busted	The battery had no effect whatsoever on the testing machine. The attending officer also noted that even if such a tactic worked, it would be extremely obvious and not be likely to fool whoever was conducting the test.
...holding copper coins in one's mouth during the test.	Busted	Though less obvious than the battery, the coins also had no appreciable effect on the result.
...applying denture cream before the test.	Busted	Adam's test actually indicated a higher blood alcohol level than his original test; while the increase was in the machine's margin of error, the method was a clear failure.
...hyperventilating before and during the test.	Busted	This method caused Jamie to appear to have about 20% more alcohol in his system than he actually did have.
...using mouthwash before the test.	Busted	On his initial test, Adam's blood alcohol level was indicated to be at near-lethal levels. When he tried again, however, the reading came back only slightly elevated over his initial result. Even if a driver were able to use this method to generate a pair of clearly impossible results, which could throw doubt on the testing machine's accuracy, that driver would then be required to immediately submit to a blood test, which cannot be fooled in any way and would definitively prove the driver's true blood alcohol level.

== Episode 7 – "Stinky Car" ==
- Original air date: December 5, 2003

=== Stinky Car ===
This myth was inspired by a story of an attractive sports car being available at a very low price but with a catch: Someone had died in the car, and even despite cleaning attempts, the smell had persisted, meaning that the owner was finding it very tough to sell the car. To test this, Jamie and Adam procured a 1987 Chevrolet Corvette and placed two fresh pig corpses in it, which was sealed with tape and placed in a shipping container for two months.

If a decomposing body is left in a car long enough...

Myth statement	Status	Notes
...the car's interior will be destroyed.	Confirmed	When unsealed, the car was full of condensation and maggots, and the upholstery was dirty and disintegrating. On further inspection, it also turned out that the car's electrics (particularly the fusebox) had become severely corroded, rendering it unable to start. Furthermore, the decaying pigs gave off ammonia, which almost overcame Jamie when he sat in the front to steer the car out of the container.
...the car cannot be cleaned up enough to remove the smell completely.	Confirmed	For this segment, Jamie and Adam called in Neal Smither and the Crime Scene Cleaners, who regularly handle extreme cleanups, including the scenes of homicides, suicides, and accidental deaths. He gave them tips on the process, including using a special bio-enzyme fluid to cut through the gunk, and allowed them to practice on a coroner's van. However, though Neal believed that the myth was busted, he realized when he saw the car that it was indeed an extreme cleanup. The car was cleaned, but some parts (such as the seats) proved to be beyond the cleaners' abilities, as well as the impracticality of disassembling every part, and even Neal said it would take him and the Crime Scene Cleaners several days to get rid of all the smelly bits and reassemble the car as best as possible. Adam also reasoned that traces of material in the air conditioning system would cause the smell to linger.
...the car cannot be cleaned up enough to be sold.	Busted	After the smell and failure to start turned away several potential buyers, the MythBusters did find a buyer who was willing to purchase the car for US$2,000 and use it for spare parts (a scrapyard owner also offered $500, though the MythBusters rebuffed this offer as being too low).

=== Raccoon Rocket ===
Myth statement	Status	Notes
A hillbilly was blasted 200 feet (61 m) out of a culvert when he tried to light gasoline in an attempt to chase down a raccoon that had escaped down the pipe.	Busted	To test this, Jamie and Adam procured a drainage pipe 3 feet (0.91 m) in diameter and placed Buster at the bottom before adding 5 US gallons (19 L) of gasoline. However, as they predicted, Buster was simply lit on fire when the gasoline was ignited—the reason being that there was a lot of space around him (no seal). To replicate the result, they encased Buster in a foam sabot, plugged the bottom end of the culvert and buried it, and used 10 pounds (4.5 kg) of black powder. Buster spectacularly exited the cannon but traveled only 100 feet (30 m), half the distance of their goal—and Adam also reasoned that no human would have survived a blast like that, let alone a blast powerful enough to launch all the way.

== Episode 8 – "Alcatraz Escape" ==
- Original air date: December 12, 2003

=== Escape From Alcatraz ===
Myth statement	Status	Notes
Three prisoners, Frank Morris and the Anglin brothers (John and Clarence), successfully escaped from Alcatraz prison using an inflatable raft made from rubber raincoats and made it to shore.	Plausible	The inmates' intended destination after escaping Alcatraz was Angel Island. The MythBusters theorized that the escapees used the tides to go to a different location, the makeshift raft crafted and crewed by the MythBusters successfully made it across the bay to the Marin Headlands. They declared the myth plausible as the fate of the prisoners was unknown. A portion of the scale tests (cut for time but later shown in "MythBusters Outtakes") also shows that belongings of the prisoners' found in the bay afterwards could have been released by the prisoners and washed up where they were found through strategic use of the bay's tides to throw the authorities off their trail. The MythBusters explored the idea that the flotsam could have drifted towards Angel Island after making it to the Marin Headlands as a way to throw the FBI off the convicts' trail. Using a scale model of the San Francisco Bay area, the tide could have washed the remains to Angel Island if released from the Marin Headlands, but as with their theory of how the escape could have succeeded, no concrete evidence existed to prove or disprove the theory. Jamie said that this was one myth he and Adam just had to test, since it is probably the most famous myth of San Francisco, where the show is based.

=== Does a Duck's Quack Echo? ===
This myth originated in lists of "Random Facts" distributed over the Internet.

Myth statement	Status	Notes
A duck's quack does not echo.	Busted	With the MythBusters initially unable to get either duck to quack, the ducks began chattering when paired. Initially, no echo could be found, so the team moved to an anechoic chamber for comparison. When examined by an audio expert, it was found that the echo was "swallowed" by the original quack, due to the very similar acoustic structure between the quack and the echo. Because of this, it may be difficult to tell where the quack ends and the echo begins, both having similar waveforms on an oscilloscope and blending together in a way that makes them difficult to distinguish. In the same way, human hearing may not perceive the difference between a duck's quack and its echo.

=== Stud Finders & Mind Control Chips ===
Myth statement	Status	Notes
When going to donate blood at the Red Cross, people are actually secretly having mind controlling microchips implanted into their bloodstream that can be detected with a stud finder.	Busted	While a stud finder can find microchips (like those used to track pets) embedded in flesh, none were found after the pair donated blood at the Red Cross.
