= MythBusters (2004 season) =

- No. of episodes: 17 (includes 1 special)

Release
- Original network: Discovery Channel
- Original release: January 11 – December 22, 2004

Season chronology
- ← Previous; 2003 season Next → 2005 season

The cast of the television series MythBusters perform experiments to verify or debunk urban legends, old wives' tales, and the like. This is a list of the various myths tested on the show as well as the results of the experiments (the myth is busted, plausible, or confirmed).

== Episode overview ==
No. overall	No. in season	Title	Original release date
12	1	"Explosive Decompression"	January 11, 2004
Myths tested: Can a bullet cause explosive decompression and tear a plane apart? Can a car's rear axle be ripped away by a steel cable tied to it and a lamppost? Will a bullet used as a fuse in a vehicle work and then will it fire?
13	2	"Chicken Gun"	January 18, 2004
Myths tested: Do frozen chickens cause more damage than thawed chickens when shot at a plane's windshield? Can octopus eggs hatch inside a human's stomach? Is there any truth to the strange story of a man who died when he tried to compact his laundry in the washing machine by standing on it?
14	3	"Breakstep Bridge"	January 25, 2004
Myths tested: Can a marching battalion take down a bridge? How many bacteria reside on a toothbrush? Is it possible to water ski behind a rowing eight?
15	4	"Sinking Titanic"	February 22, 2004
Myths tested: Could the sinking Titanic literally suck a person down with it? Does a goldfish's memory last for only 3 seconds? Can explosives packed in a trombone cause the slide to rocket off it?
16	5	"Buried in Concrete"	February 25, 2004
Myths tested: Is Jimmy Hoffa buried under Giants Stadium? Can the venom from a daddy long-legs kill a human? Can a jet engine launch a taxi into the air?
17	6	"Myths Revisited"	June 8, 2004
Myths tested: Can a marching battalion take down a bridge? (Revisit of: Breakstep Bridge); Is it possible to make a "magic bullet" out of ice? (Revisit of: Magic Bullet); Do frozen chickens cause more damage than thawed chickens when shot at a plane's windshield? (Revisit of: Chicken Gun); Will using a cell phone near a gas pump cause an explosion? (Revisit of: Cell Phone Destruction); Can being painted with gold paint actually be deadly? (Revisit of: Goldfinger); Can leaving a can of aerosol spray or cola inside a hot car cause it to explode? Can an inflatable brassiere explode inside of an airplane as it climbs in altitude? Can urinating on an electric fence cause electrocution? Note: This is the first appearance of Tory Belleci, Scottie Chapman, and "Mythtern" Christine Chamberlain.
18	7	"Scuba Diver and Car Capers"	July 27, 2004
Myths tested: Can a scuba diver be sucked up in a firefighting helicopter? Are various car myths from movies true?
19	8	"Ancient Death Ray"	September 29, 2004
Myths tested: Can mirrors be used to make a death ray? What solutions are effective against skunk smell? What common objects are bulletproof?
20	9	"Elevator of Death, Levitation Machine"	October 6, 2004
Myths tested: Can someone survive a multi-story elevator fall by jumping right before the elevator hits the bottom of the shaft? Is it possible to make a hovercraft with a vacuum motor? Note: This is the final appearance of folklorist Heather Joseph-Witham.
21	10	"Beat the Radar Detector"	October 13, 2004
Myths tested: If someone falls off a building, can that person glide to safety using a sheet of plywood? Can you beat a radar detector?
22	11	"Quicksand"	October 20, 2004
Myths tested: Can a person be sucked down by "killer quicksand"? Can a tattoo explode in an MRI scan? Can appliances really electrocute people if they fall in the bathtub?
23	12	"Exploding Jawbreaker"	October 27, 2004
Myths tested: Can a superheated jawbreaker explode when bitten down upon? Can a PVC pipe build enough static electricity to kill? Can a playing card kill a person if thrown with enough power?
24	13	"Pingpong Rescue"	November 3, 2004
Myths tested: How many balloons are needed to lift a 40-lb child off the ground? Can a sunken boat be lifted to the surface with ping-pong balls?
25	14	"Boom-Lift Catapult"	November 10, 2004
Myths tested: Is it possible to make a catapult with a boom lift? Does a person save more gas by driving with the AC on instead of having the windows down?
26	15	"Exploding House"	November 16, 2004
Myths tested: Can too many bug bombs blow up a house? How hard is it to find a needle in a haystack? Will talking to plants help them grow?
27	16	"Ming Dynasty Astronaut"	December 5, 2004
Myths tested: Can a person be launched by rockets strapped to a chair, like in the Ming Dynasty tale? Do free energy devices seen on the Internet actually work? Can jumping into a ceiling fan cause a person to lose his head?
28	Special–1	"Viewers-Choice/Christmas Special"	December 22, 2004
Myths tested: Can a frozen turkey explode if it is dropped into deep fryer pot too fast? If you place a silver spoon in a bottle of champagne, will the bubbles last longer? Can a falling icicle kill someone? Does a clothed snowman melt slower than a "naked" one? Can a urine stream freeze in the winter? Can lighting a fire in the fireplace with a chimney make the rest of the house colder? Note: This is a special episode.

== Episode 9 – "Explosive Decompression" ==
- Original air date: January 11, 2004

=== Explosive Decompression ===
Myth statement	Status	Notes
Explosive decompression can occur when a bullet is fired through the fuselage of a pressurized airplane, causing the hole to grow dramatically and possibly cause the plane to break up, as seen in movies such as U.S. Marshals.	Busted	Sealing a decommissioned DC-9, seating Buster, and pressurizing it to 8 psi (55 kPa), Adam and Jamie remotely fired a 9×19mm pistol through the window, then the fuselage. Neither resulted in more than a 9 mm (0.35 in) hole, so they wired a window with detonating cord, which blew the window out but failed to suck more than Buster's arm through. A 100-grain (6.5 g) shaped charge successfully caused catastrophic failure. Adam and Jamie reviewed Aloha Airlines Flight 243, where a Boeing 737 safely landed despite an explosive decompression. This myth was revisited in "MythBusters Revisited".

=== Frog Giggin' ===
Myth statement	Status	Notes
A group of rednecks returning from frog hunting uses a live .22 LR cartridge as a replacement for a burned-out fuse in their pickup, but while the truck is driving, the bullet heats up enough to discharge, hitting the driver in the groin and causing enough damage to require surgery.	Busted "for now" (Plausible)	After finding a fuse panel that accepts glass SAE fuses, the MythBusters mounted it in a truck, seated Buster, and inserted the round. The cartridge did work as a replacement fuse, but when a short circuit was created, the wiring burned up the round without igniting it. When the wiring was upgraded to a higher gauge, the bullet did fire but not with enough velocity to cause any serious injury. With this myth not having a "plausible" verdict at the time, both Adam and Jamie agreed to call it busted "for now" due to a lack of conclusive evidence, but they noted it as "unlikely but possible".

=== Rear Axle ===
Myth statement	Status	Notes
A steel cable, anchored to both a street light post and the rear axle of a police car, will be able to yank the axle clear out from under the car when it tries to drive off, as seen in the film American Graffiti.	Busted	Rigging the car with radio control and a cable, the MythBusters made several attempts to pull the axle, but the first two attempts failed due to the cable snapping. After Adam cut through most of the axle supports and upgraded the cable from 5/16 in (7.9 mm) to 5/8 in (16 mm), he and Jamie successfully pulled the axle free, but it did not clear the wheel well and did snap the cable again. Adam and Jamie theorized that, in the movie, a ramp was used to give the car and axle enough of a boost to wrench the axle completely free.

== Episode 10 – "Chicken Gun" ==
- Original air date: January 18, 2004

=== Chicken Gun ===
Allegedly, British rail companies borrowed the titular gun from NASA for testing windshields for high-speed trains, but they were shocked and confused at the amount of carnage the gun did. When they asked NASA what they were doing wrong, they were told to thaw the chickens before firing.

Myth statement	Status	Notes
A frozen chicken launched in a bird strike simulation can penetrate aircraft or train windshields better than a thawed chicken.	Busted (Plausible upon retesting)	First, Jamie and Adam designed and built an air gun with a barrel big enough to handle chickens. Jamie re-used and enlarged the design he used when designing the "improved" 7Up vending machine that was featured in a TV commercial—a tank of compressed air connected to a barrel by a butterfly valve that could release the air in an instant. They then designed foam sabots for the chickens to make sure they were propelled properly out of the gun and procured a used Piper Cherokee fuselage and several spare windshields to shoot at. With the blessing of pumpkin chunking world champion Bruce Bradford, Adam and Jamie proceeded with their initial test. Not only did both frozen and thawed chickens go through the windshields every time, but on their test shot, a frozen chicken broke the pane of Lexan they had set up to protect the windshields. They declared the myth busted—but then realized they had made a big mistake: Piper Cherokee windscreens are not rated for bird strikes. The MythBusters then came up with another test—time of impact (which would be the one variable that could affect force of impact since mass was constant whether the chicken was frozen or thawed)—and tested it by firing the chickens at a metal plate viewed with a high speed camera. They found that the impact times were exactly the same and thus declared the myth busted, but this verdict was later overturned in the "Myths Revisited" when they found that the penetration was still different. After the MythBusters' initial verdict, they also fired a pumpkin at one of the windows, and it went through both windows and through the Lexan glass shield and came to rest several meters away.

=== Killer Washing Machine ===
Myth statement	Status	Notes
While overstuffing his washing machine with 50 pounds (23 kg) of laundry, a man accidentally wedged himself into the machine and tripped the spin cycle, flailing him around, spilling laundry detergent and bleach as he was bludgeoned to death against the shelves. Afterwards, the man's dog urinated on the baking soda, causing an explosion.	"Decimated" (Busted)	Not one part of this myth was found to be even remotely plausible. A normal washing machine drum has so little torque that it can be halted in its spin cycle simply by grabbing on to it, though a motor from an electric car was able to spin Buster at dangerous speeds. In addition, most machines have a safety feature that prevents the machine from running if the door is open. Finally, dog urine does not react with baking soda in a way that would cause an explosion. Adam stated at the end that, due to not a single element of this myth having one grain of truth, he found the myth "decimated" (the bumper after showing "Busted").

=== Octopus Egg Pregnancy ===
Myth statement	Status	Notes
A woman, while swimming, accidentally swallowed a fertilized octopus egg, which gestated in her stomach and caused symptoms similar to that of pregnancy, eventually having a live octopus cut out of her body.	Busted	The human stomach is far too inhospitable an environment to sustain an octopus egg through its full gestation. No experiment was aired, the conclusion reached only through interviews with a marine biologist from Monterey Bay Aquarium and a pathologist.

== Episode 11 – "Breakstep Bridge" ==
- Original air date: January 25, 2004

=== Breakstep Bridge ===
Myth statement	Status	Notes
Soldiers marching in unison can cause harmonic oscillation in a bridge and cause it to collapse. (see Broughton Suspension Bridge)	Busted (Plausible upon retesting)	Adam built a 60-foot (18 m) by 6-foot (1.8 m) suspension bridge from metal tubing and nylon rope, while Jamie built 12 dummy soldiers out of air-powered actuators and combat boots. In the initial test, the soldiers moved far too slowly due to a disconnected hose. During the second and third tests, the soldiers stomped too hard on the bridge, causing it to collapse from impact without any harmonic vibration. The myth was retested for "Myths Revisited" and found plausible. It was ultimately cut out of the episode; however, it was later included in "MythBusters Outtakes".

=== Rowing Water Skier ===
Myth statement	Status	Notes
A rowing eight can pull a water skier at sufficient speed for the skier to stay upright.	Confirmed	After several tries, Jamie was able to stay upright for over 40 seconds, with only a few hours experience in waterskiing.

=== Toothbrush Surprise ===
Myth statement	Status	Notes
Fecal coliform bacteria can travel from a toilet to a toothbrush and grow in its bristles.	Confirmed	After confirming that a toilet flush does emit an aerosol spray, Adam built a rack to hold 44 toothbrushes at various distances from the toilet in the shop, as well as two controls kept in the office. Each day, Adam and Jamie exposed the brushes to toothpaste and rinsed them with distilled water, with brushing with a pair kept right above the toilet bowl. Fecal coliforms were indeed found on all the test brushes, including the control ones, but none at a level high enough to be dangerous. A microbiologist from UCSF confirmed that such coliforms were impossible to completely avoid, and that there was no significant difference in the number of bacteria based on where the toothbrushes were placed in respect to the toilet bowl. This surprising result prompts the narrator to proclaim, "Some myths are best left unanswered!"

== Episode 12 – "Sinking Titanic" ==
- Original air date: February 22, 2004

=== Goldfish Memory ===
This myth is so widely passed around that it even made it into Time magazine's "numbers" section at one point.

Myth statement	Status	Notes
A goldfish's memory lasts only three seconds.	Busted	Jamie trained his goldfish to recognize color patterns and complete an obstacle course under water. They remembered what Jamie had taught them over a month later and easily completed the same course without his prompting. However, Adam's fish suffered from a filter malfunction and they were not getting enough food.

=== The Mad Trombonist ===
Myth statement	Status	Notes
A trombonist had put a firecracker into the mute and, at the final note of the 1812 Overture, launched the mute, striking the conductor and knocking him back into the audience. In addition, the bell of the trombone was blown wide open and the slide was launched.	Busted	Using a firecracker, the mute hit the conductor (Buster) but did not knock him over. When the equivalent of six model rocket engines was used, he fell forward after being hit. When even more were used, the trombone was practically destroyed, but the bell still did not peel back, nor did the slide launch. Since not even the first part of the myth could be duplicated, the rest could not have followed.

This myth was later tested on "Myths Redux".

=== Sinking Titanic ===
Myth statement	Status	Notes
A sinking ship creates enough suction to pull a person under if that person is too close (as was rumored to occur when the RMS Titanic sank).	Busted	Though using a small ship, neither Adam nor Jamie were sucked under when it sank, not even when they were riding directly on top of it. The use of a vessel with a large displacement was not practical.

It was noted during the episode that the story of Charles Joughin, the Titanic's chief baker, contradicted the myth. He testified in a 1912 enquiry that he held on to the stern railing of the ship as it went down. As the ship went under, he stepped off; his hair did not get wet, much less himself get sucked under with the ship. However, the story does hold some credence, as many ships emit a large amount of air, as they sink. This massive amount of air, rising to the surface, creates a situation, whereby there is loss of buoyancy in the air bubbles, and anyone caught in this will sink, hence the belief that the ship is "pulling" a floating person down with it.

Later, while the MythBusters were preparing for the Ping Pong Salvage myth, the Sinking Titanic myth was re-tested and re-busted as Adam pointed out.

== Episode 13 – "Buried in Concrete" ==
- Original air date: February 25, 2004

=== Buried in Concrete ===
The myth revolved around Jimmy Hoffa, a union leader who unexpectedly disappeared, and the rumors that surrounded his disappearance. Among the myths was that he was buried under the infamous ten-yard bump in Giants Stadium, a rumor that persisted in various forms of media.

Myth statement	Status	Notes
Jimmy Hoffa was buried in Giants Stadium.	Busted	Adam and Jamie tested several areas on the field held by rumor to be Hoffa's final resting place. No readings were found consistent with a cavity left by a body that had rotted away.

=== Daddy Long-Legs ===
Myth statement	Status	Notes
A daddy long-legs has the most potent venom of all spiders, but it is unable to pierce human skin.	Busted	A daddy long-legs was able to bite through the skin of Adam's arm. He reported nothing more than a very mild, short-lived burning sensation. Analysis of the venom proves it does not approach the potency of the black widow spider.

=== Jet Taxi ===
This was the first myth in which the MythBusters were neither able to confirm nor bust the results due to logistics reasons. According to the episode, upon arrival at Mojave Spaceport, the insurance company responsible for the aircraft backed out at the last minute, citing possible foreign object damage to the plane. However, BBC's Top Gear was able to independently test and verify this myth.

Myth statement	Status	Notes
Jet wash from an airliner can overturn a taxi if the vehicle passes behind the jet as it goes to full throttle.	Partly plausible	Adam and Jamie tried overturning a used taxi they had purchased, but they were unable to get the car to flip. They could not bust the myth for two reasons. For one, they were unable to acquire proper jet engines for insurance reasons, and they had to settle for a pair of far smaller jet engines than were allegedly used in the myth. For another, a news article confirmed that a taxi in Brazil was blown off the road by a Boeing 737 that was taking off. While it is unlikely a car will pass so closely behind a jet taking off, it may flip over in the jet wash if it does pass that close.

This myth was retested and confirmed in the Supersized Myths Special.

Additionally, during the Storm Chasing Myths special (2010 season, episode 13), jet engines were used to simulate high wind speeds. Cars were used to demonstrate the power of the winds that both storm chaser's vehicles would be up against. All of the vehicles were shown blowing a considerable distance from the jet engines with significant damage done to both just from the winds alone.

== Episode 14 – "Myths Revisited" ==
- Original air date: June 8, 2004

This was the first episode where the MythBusters retested earlier myths that had been commented or criticized by fans or had not performed as per their original expectations and test spinoff myths related to earlier myths. The episode also introduced Tory Belleci, Scottie Chapman, and Christine Chamberlain and became the first episode to extensively feature Build Team members or Mythterns. This is also the first episode to officially use the Busted/Plausible/Confirmed system; previous episodes were a bit looser and had only Busted as a consistent verdict.

=== Breakstep Bridge ===
This myth was retested for the episode but ultimately did not air in the US version—although the Robin Banks–narrated Discovery Europe version did include it. This myth is also included in the DVD version of "MythBusters Outtakes".

Myth statement	Status	Notes
Soldiers marching in unison can cause harmonic oscillation in a bridge and cause it to collapse. (From Breakstep Bridge)	Plausible	The first time the myth was tested, the miniature bridge was flawed enough in its design to get an inconclusive answer, but with this test, testing just the natural resonance frequency of a simple wooden bridge resulted in a plausible conclusion, but it is very improbable. This segment was cut from the U.S. broadcast but was included in the European version. View video clips of the test on the Discovery Channel website.

=== Chicken Gun ===
Myth statement	Status	Notes
A frozen chicken will penetrate aircraft or train windshields better than a thawed chicken. (From Chicken Gun)	Plausible	Instead of using a single thickness of glass to represent the windshield, Adam and Jamie set up a stack of 12 panes and fired their chickens at it. The frozen chicken broke through all the panes, while the thawed one did not. Adam and Jamie classified the myth as plausible because they could find no record of windshields being shattered by bird strikes.

=== Ice Bullet ===
Myth statement	Status	Notes
An ice bullet can kill someone without leaving a trace. (From Magic Bullet)	Re-busted	The MythBusters retested using slow-frozen bullets that were stronger than the ones they used previously. As previously, the bullets simply vaporized when the trigger was pulled.

=== Cell Phone Destruction ===
Myth statement	Status	Notes
Using one's cell phone while pumping gas/petrol can cause an explosion. (From Cell Phone Destruction)	Re-busted	The battery of retests the MythBusters performed reaffirmed their original Busted verdict.

=== Aerosol Bazooka ===
Myth statement	Status	Notes
Leaving a can of aerosol spray or cola inside a hot car can cause it to explode. (Spinoff of Biscuit Bazooka)	Busted/Plausible	The aerosol cans did not explode inside a car after sitting in the sun for hours. Both aerosol and cola took temperatures of over 300 °F (150 °C) to blow. This myth was later revisited in season 2005, where it was revealed that Adam had ended the test too early and that soda will explode at 224.6 °C (436.3 °F).

=== Exploding Implants ===
Myth statement	Status	Notes
An inflatable brassiere can explode inside an airplane as it climbs in altitude. (Spinoff of Silicone Breasts)	Re-busted	The different types of inflatable brassieres tested proved capable of maintaining their integrity even at altitudes fatal to humans.

=== Peeing on the Third Rail ===
Myth statement	Status	Notes
Urinating on an electric fence can cause electrocution. (Spinoff of Peeing on the Third Rail)	Busted/Plausible	Upon this myth being retesting on an electric fence, it was found to be plausible, but the rail myth was still busted. Distance was the factor, as the urine stream breaks up less at the close range needed for urinating on the fence than urinating on the third rail, thus ensuring a direct line of current between one's body and the electrical source.

=== Goldfinger ===
Myth statement	Status	Notes
Covering one's body in gold paint can kill a person by skin asphyxiation, like in the James Bond movie Goldfinger. (From the myth Goldfinger)	Re-busted	When Adam retested the myth, his vital signs did not change except for body temperature, which actually dropped (the myth stated that body temperature would go up due to the paint). The original anomalies with Jamie's test were likely due more to his own physiology than the application of the paint.

== Episode 15 – "Scuba Diver and Car Capers" ==
- Original air date: July 27, 2004

=== Forest Fire Scuba Diver ===
Myth statement	Status	Notes
A scuba diver can be sucked up by a firefighting helicopter and dumped on a forest fire.	Busted	The type of pumps used in firefighting helicopters cannot continue running once in the air. As soon as the pump is shut off, any caught diver would simply drop back into the water. The pumps also do not have enough suction to suck in a person in the first place. As for the version of the story involving a helicopter bucket, the openings on the bucket are too small for a diver to get scooped up.

=== Car Capers ===
Myth statement	Status	Notes
If a car's tailpipe is plugged with objects, the engine will be destroyed.	Busted	All of the objects used were shot out immediately after the engine started up.
If a bullet is shot through the fuel tank, it will explode.	Busted	The gas tank did not explode. This was revisited in "MythBusters Revisited".
A car door can protect a person from bullets in a shoot-out.	Busted	The car door did not stop the bullets shot at it. Large-caliber bullets were completely unaffected, and while small-caliber bullets were deflected somewhat, most of them would still hit the car's occupant(s).
A car's engine will be destroyed when liquid drain clog remover is put into the tank.	Busted	The engine still ran.
A car's engine will be destroyed when bleach is put into the tank.	Plausible	The engine soon died out but was not ruined from the experience. The following morning, the inside of the gas tank was covered in rust.
A car's engine will be destroyed when sugar is put into the tank.	Busted	The engine still ran; in fact, it ran even better.
Adding mothballs to the fuel tank increases the horsepower.	Plausible	The engine still started, but it soon started spluttering. When Adam pressed the accelerator, the engine sounded more powerful.
Cola can be used as a substitute for radiator coolant.	Plausible	The engine ran with cola in the radiator, but it may cause damage.
If a radiator is leaking, cracking an egg into the radiator will plug the holes.	Plausible	The engine was started after the contents of an egg were poured in, and the leak stopped. The MythBusters agreed that it would be an ideal short-term solution.
A piece of metal can destroy an engine when it falls in the carburetor.	Busted	A penny dropped in could be heard rattling, but the engine still ran.
Bleach in the oil can destroy the engine.	Confirmed	The engine started, but it soon started smoking and very quickly overheated. The engine was so hot, the undercarriage started burning and Adam fried an egg on the tailpipe. The engine was ultimately ruined.

== Episode 16 – "Ancient Death Ray" ==
- Original air date: September 29, 2004

=== Ancient Death Ray ===
The MythBusters take on a myth from antiquity, where it is claimed that Archimedes constructed a solar-powered weapon by reflecting sunlight onto Roman ships. The result of the test sparked so much controversy, especially in engineering circles, that an entire episode ("Archimedes Death Ray") was dedicated to a 2006 retest. In 2010, the myth was visited a third time in the "President's Challenge" episode, in which United States President Barack Obama challenged Adam and Jamie to make a third attempt using more manpower. To date, this and JATO Rocket Car are the only myths to have been tested three times on the show.

Myth statement	Status	Notes
Archimedes constructed a death ray by reflecting sunlight onto, and thus igniting, Roman vessels.	Busted	To have any effect, the mirror would have to be impractically large, and even then, the temperature of wood was raised only a few degrees. On the Discovery website, however, a challenge was thrown out to the viewers to come up with an experiment to prove it plausible, and so far, a few of the entries seem to have done so. When all the tests were completed, the myth was conclusively busted.

=== Skunked! ===
The smell of skunk musk can be removed with...

Myth statement	Status	Notes
...tomato juice.	Plausible	Adam and Jamie had significant problems attempting to get a skunk to spray them, so they took the skunk to the women's restroom and cornered it to try to get it to spray. Finally, after being sprayed, Adam and Jamie covered themselves in tomato puree. Neither the two MythBusters nor their builder Scottie could detect the odor of skunk after they had been covered with the tomato juice.
...beer.	Busted	For the rest of the tests, Adam and Jamie tried to eliminate the skunk odors from the women's restroom. (The skunk they had brought in would not spray Adam and Jamie again.) After Adam and Jamie tried to use beer to clean up the mess, Scottie claimed that the beer covered up some of the smell, but the skunk odor was still there.
...a douche.	Busted	Scottie was still able to detect the skunk odor as well as the beer.
...a custom mixture.	Confirmed	A mixture of soap, hydrogen peroxide, and baking soda proved to work best for actually eliminating the aroma of skunk musk. The precise formula may be found in Wikibooks.
...commercial cleaners.	Confirmed	For the final test, Adam had to use synthetic skunk odor because the custom mixture had completely eliminated the skunk odor. Scottie said that it worked, but she said that there was a hint of skunk in the air and that the custom mixture was more effective.

=== What is Bulletproof? ===
Adam and Jamie test whether some things that are mythically held to be bulletproof are actually bulletproof—included among them was an assertion by Jamie in the first season on their Lexan barriers being bulletproof.

Bullets can be stopped by...

Myth statement	Status	Notes
...a book.	Busted	A hardcover book of at least 400 pages can potentially stop a .22 rifle shot, but anything stronger would shoot completely through.
...a deck of playing cards.	Busted	The deck failed to stop any bullets.
...a Zippo lighter.	Busted	The lighter failed to stop any bullets. This was revisited in "Failure is not an option" in the final season and found to be "Plausible", provided that the bullet's speed was slowed by a ricochet.
...a quarter-inch polycarbonate shield like that used by MythBusters.	Busted	The shield failed to stop any bullets.
...an inch-thick polycarbonate panel rated bullet-resistant.	Plausible	Adam and Jamie tested using a four-sided box made of bullet-resistant polycarbonate laminate. The panels stopped .22, .357, and .44 magnum bullets, but a .30-06 Springfield shot from an M1903 Springfield penetrated both front and rear portions of the box.

== Episode 17 – "Elevator of Death, Levitation Machine" ==
- Original air date: October 6, 2004

=== Elevator of Death ===
This myth is fueled by the story of an elevator attendant found alive but badly injured in an elevator car that had fallen 75 stories down a shaft in the Empire State Building after a B-25 Mitchell bomber crashed into it in 1945.

Myth statement	Status	Notes
It is possible to survive by jumping up at the last moment before a freefalling elevator hits the ground.	Busted	The jumping power of a human being cannot cancel out the falling velocity of the elevator; the elevator car would have struck the bottom of the shaft at around 53 mph (85 km/h), while a human being can jump only at around 2 or 3 mph (3 or 5 km/h), not enough to make a significant difference in the impact force. The best speculative advice from an elevator expert would be to lie on the elevator floor instead of jumping. Adam and Jamie speculated the attendant survived because the tight elevator shaft created an air cushion. This, together with spring action from a slack elevator cable, could have slowed the car to survivable speeds.

After finding a bowling ball in the abandoned hotel in which they were testing the myth, Kari decided to test out a "mini-myth" of her own.

Myth statement	Status	Notes
Dropping a bowling ball on a tiled floor will shatter the tiles.	Busted	The ball did not shatter or even crack the tiles after Kari dropped it. After spotting Kari's failed test, however, Jamie took the ball and bowled it at some wall tiles on the other side of the hall, and the force of that impact did shatter the tiles that were hit.

=== Levitation Machine ===
Adam and Jamie try to build a hovercraft from vacuum cleaner parts, and after finding it plausible, they decide to compete against each other in a homemade hovercraft racing contest. Adam, along with Tory and Christine (dubbed "Team Savage"), built the heavier Lillypad Flyer, while Jamie, Scottie, and Kari (dubbed "Hyneman's Heroes") worked together to make the Hyneman Hoverboard.

Myth statement	Status	Notes
An average person can build a homemade makeshift hovercraft on a budget of under $500.	Partly plausible	While they did cheat and go slightly over-budget, both Adam and Jamie built two separate functional hovercraft. While Adam's Lilypad Flyer and Jamie's Hyneman Hoverboard were both rather impractical, they worked nonetheless. It was also disputed whether or not the hovercraft could be properly labeled as levitation machines.

== Episode 18 – "Beat the Radar Detector" ==
- Original air date: October 13, 2004

=== Plywood Builder ===
Adam and Jamie tested a construction-related myth, and they put several other objects said to be able to act as a parachute to the test.

Myth statement	Status	Notes
Holding a large sheet of plywood will slow a fall from a building enough to make it survivable.	Busted	The fall was almost completely uncontrollable, and the impact was still deadly. Even under the best possible conditions, the fall was not survivable. In fact, the plywood actually made the fall less survivable, as not only did Buster hit the ground at a slightly higher speed than when he fell without holding anything, but the plywood also broke in two over Buster's body when he hit the ground, which would undoubtedly have inflicted additional injuries. Even when the myth was stretched to custom-built constructions of the five individual plies of the plywood, neither Adam's nor Jamie's designs were any improvement.
Opening an umbrella will slow a fall from a building enough to make it survivable.	Busted	Though different umbrellas did slow a fall, the impact was still deadly. A real parachute was also tested, but it was found to be unable to properly arrest a fall from only 60 ft (18 m). The best an umbrella can do is hold the person somewhat upright, causing less damage to the head.

=== Beat the Radar Gun ===
This is the first myth entirely tested by the Build Team.

It is possible to legally beat the police speed radar and/or lidar by...

Myth statement	Status	Notes
...jingling a set of keys.	Busted	The keys had no effect at all.
...dangling a disco ball from the rear-view mirror.	Busted	The disco ball had no effect at all. It is also illegal (in California, where the show is filmed) to have anything large and obstructive hanging off the rear-view mirror.
...dangling CDs from the rear-view mirror.	Busted	The CDs had no effect at all, and they are also illegal in California.
...covering the hubcaps in tin foil.	Busted	The tin foil did not have any noticeable effect.
...covering the entire car in tin foil.	Busted	The tin foil acted as a large reflector and actually enhanced the detection ability of the radar.
...jamming the lidar by lining the front license plate with light-emitting diodes (LEDs)	Busted	The LEDs were not strong enough to interfere with the lidar.
...jamming the lidar by covering the entire car with LEDs.	Not tested	While the idea did come up in the brainstorming phase, it was too impractical to test on the full-scale car.
...jamming the radar by bouncing microwaves at it.	Busted	Kari's two magnetrons (Note: It is shown that the car used had been fitted with a magnetron on each side of the front of the car used.) failed to jam the police radar.
...shooting scraps of tin foil behind the car as chaff.	Busted	There were too many rogue variables to get the system to work properly, particularly wind. The car was still detectable, and the chaff did nothing to disrupt the radar. This solution would also likely result in a much stiffer penalty for littering.
...spinning a wheel of mirrors on top of the car slower than the actual speed of the car.	Partly busted	Tory's device actually tricked the radar into displaying the car as going one or two miles per hour slower but not enough to help. The device itself was highly impractical. Unlike the rear-view mirror attachments, the roof mounted device was actually not illegal in California.
...painting the car matte-black to absorb the radar and light beams.	Busted	The matte-black paint did nothing to reduce the detectability of the car.
...painting the car with special radar absorbing paint, like a stealth aircraft.	Not tested/not practical	The special paint is loaded with iron and goes on like frosting. It was so heavy that the toy car used in the preliminary tests could barely move. It was never properly tested on the full-scale car, because it would be more expensive than just paying off any speeding tickets.

== Episode 19 – "Quicksand" ==
- Original air date: October 20, 2004

=== Killer Quicksand ===
Myth statement	Status	Notes
"Killer quicksand", like in the movies (i.e., quicksand that slowly sucks any person or animal unlucky enough to fall into it under), really exists.	Busted	Quicksand is denser than water; the greater the density of the liquid, the greater the buoyancy of objects within. Adam and Jamie got into the tub of quicksand and were entirely safe, floating with the quicksand about waist-high. They concluded any victims found in quicksand likely died for some other reason, such as dehydration or exposure to the elements.

=== Appliances in the Bath ===
Myth statement	Status	Notes
One can be killed by dropping an electrical appliance into a bath full of water.	Confirmed	The electrocution effect is increased if the appliance drops farther from the drain or if the water has more salt in it (such as due to urine or epsom salts). They also proved that devices (and probably, by extension, sockets) with GFCIs are effective at preventing these electrocutions, as a GFCI-equipped hairdryer cut off on contact with the water.

=== Exploding Tattoo ===
Myth statement	Status	Notes
Tattoos can explode when exposed to an MRI.	Busted	The compounds in the pigments of most tattoos simply do not react to magnetic fields. Old pigments of the color black, which had iron in the composition, could cause some discomfort at most.
Tattoos can explode when exposed to a transmitter.	Not in this episode	This chapter of the myth was not shown in this episode. See "MythBusters Outtakes".

== Episode 20 – "Exploding Jawbreaker" ==
- Original air date: October 27, 2004

=== Exploding Jawbreaker ===
This myth was inspired by incidents that left two children—Cameron DeHall and Taquandra Diggs—with what were later diagnosed as chemical burns after jawbreakers blew up in their faces. It had also been reported that DeHall had heated his jawbreaker in the microwave. The Diggs family and several other victims' families had already sued Nestlé for medical bills resulting from plastic surgery as well as pain and suffering. The lawsuits were later settled outside of court for an undisclosed amount.

Adam and Jamie, with help from Tory and Christine, tested the myth in a number of ways. When Jamie cut a jawbreaker open using a band saw, he found that the way the candy is built (various layers of sugar around a solid candy center) creates the potential for a temperature differential. Specifically, the various layers can heat at different rates, creating a scenario where a layer can expand, cause pressure on the outer shell, and make the candy unstable. (Christine found, by using an infrared thermometer, that one layer got up to 224.6 °F (107.0 °C) after microwave heating.) If the candy was compressed—including in someone's jaws—the candy could explosively burst and its almost molten centers could cause painful burns.

Myth statement	Status	Notes
A jawbreaker can explode when bitten after being heated.	Confirmed	For the first test, Tory constructed a pair of jaws with steel teeth that could bite with the average human's bite force (about 170 pounds (77 kg)). After the MythBusters tried various combinations of heating, cooling, and pressure, a jawbreaker did indeed explode when bitten, catching Christine on her temple and neck and Adam on the arm with burning candy as the "jaw rig" they had set up was not enclosed by safety screens. Adam seconded Jamie's opinion that the candy retains heat well on impact and likened it to napalm.
A jawbreaker can explode when caustic soda is added and the mixture is heated.	Confirmed	This second test came from an idea that Adam touched on that caustic soda (lye), which is often used in the cleaning of food-processing equipment (including candy-making equipment), could have made jawbreakers more likely to explode. To test it, Jamie, Adam, and Christine prepared four samples of caustic soda and added ground-up jawbreaker to two and ascorbic acid (Vitamin C, which is another common food additive) to the other two, then added water and heat to different halves of the matched pairs. The heat treatment consisted of microwaving them for five minutes—until the caustic soda and crushed jawbreaker mix combusted into what Adam described as a "burning cupcake" that left a batch of hot ash. The caustic soda, ascorbic acid, and water mix also turned very hot. Adam then suggested taking their remaining crushed jawbreaker/caustic soda mix in the toaster oven to simulate radiant heat (being left out in the sun)—and it resulted in the mixture smoking and then bursting into flames, leaving rock-hard residue.
The plastic packaging of a jawbreaker can make it more likely to explode if it is heated and then bitten.	Confirmed	Adam also suggested finding out if the plastic packaging of a jawbreaker can make it more likely to blow up, and to test it, they ran a test similar to the first one, first heating a jawbreaker while still in its bag to simulate radiant heat and then putting it in the jaws. While it did not explode, they examined it and found that it was still weakened enough to potentially explode, which led them to confirm this aspect of the myth as well.

As a finale, Jamie created a more literal exploding jawbreaker by removing the core, filling it with gunpowder, adding a fuse, and then detonating it.

=== Static Cannon ===
Myth statement	Status	Notes
A construction worker accidentally killed himself with static charge after sandblasting an 8" PVC pipe.	Busted	No static charge built up on the pipe in initial testing. Even after they were converted into a Van de Graaff generator and a Leyden jar, the amount of static electricity produced was too small to actually kill a person—at worst, it would only create a stunning but survivable shock. The original circumstances of the myth preclude any significant static buildup—resting the pipe on metal jack stands allows the pipe to discharge to the ground while sand in the air from the sandblasting can dissipate static charge the same way humidity can.

=== Killer Deck ===
Myth statement	Status	Notes
An ordinary playing card can actually kill a person if thrown with enough power.	Busted	Adam was already fairly adept at throwing cards, his maximum speed being 25 miles per hour (40 km/h); this failed to cause any injury. After trying some designs for a card-throwing machine, Adam and Jamie settled on a design that could throw cards at 155 miles per hour (249 km/h). When this device was used on Jamie, it caused a small cut that drew only a small amount of blood.

== Episode 21 – "Pingpong Rescue" ==
- Original air date: November 3, 2004

=== Ping Pong Salvage ===
Adam and Jamie explore the possibility of raising a ship with ping-pong balls, originally conceived in the 1949 Donald Duck story The Sunken Yacht by Carl Barks.

Myth statement	Status	Notes
Ping-pong balls can be used to raise a sunken ship.	Plausible	Even though it took an impractically large number of ping-pong balls (27,000), when enough of them were piped into the Mythtanic II, the boat rose to the surface. However, it took far fewer balls than Adam and Jamie expected (60,000). In addition, this technique is of dubious legality—if containment of the ping-pong balls were to fail, the "rescuer" would quite probably run afoul of environmental-protection laws.

=== Carried Away ===
The Build Team takes on a gag used in many comedic works, where a baby or small child is lifted into the air and flies away unintentionally when given helium balloons.

Myth statement	Status	Notes
A four-year-old child can be lifted by a bunch of party balloons.	Busted	A large number of balloons (3,500) would be required to lift an average four-year-old girl of 44 lb (20 kg) just a few feet off the ground, so the myth could not have happened unintentionally.

See also Larry's Lawn Chair Balloon from Pilot 3.

== Episode 22 – "Boom-Lift Catapult" ==
- Original air date: November 10, 2004

=== Boom-Lift Catapult ===
Myth statement	Status	Notes
A boom lift can potentially catapult its operator 200 ft (60 m), in a concept similar to that of a traction trebuchet.	Busted	When a car engine was dropped from the boom lift, it barely even wobbled, much less catapulted Buster (it did not even "spill his coffee"). In an attempt to duplicate the myth result, the boom lift was converted into a counterweight trebuchet, mounted on several shipping containers to give it clearance to rotate. On its first throw, it threw Buster at a steep (downward) angle towards the ground and then collapsed between the containers, destroying itself.

=== AC vs. Windows Down ===
Adam and Jamie tackle not so much a myth as what they call an "urban puzzle". The debate arises because both methods of cooling influence a car's fuel efficiency—air conditioning requires a lot of power to run, but at the same time, open windows create drag. This myth was revisited in "MythBusters Revisited".

Myth statement	Status	Notes
Running a car with air conditioning on is more fuel efficient than running with the windows down.	Partly busted	Tests were performed under varying conditions—55 miles per hour (89 km/h) versus 45 miles per hour (72 km/h)). Also, the 55 mph test was using a computer to estimate fuel efficiency based on air intake, not actual fuel consumption, and showed A/C was more efficient. The 45 mph test consisted of running the tank until it was empty, and it showed open windows were more efficient. This experiment—or one like it—is sometimes cited by the Magliozzi Brothers on Car Talk when presented with this question.

== Episode 23 – "Exploding House" ==
- Original air date: November 16, 2004

=== Bug Bomb ===
Myth statement	Status	Notes
Overusing bug bombs can blow up a house.	Confirmed	A house actually exploded in San Diego, California because a family used too many bug bombs and an accidental spark ignited the chemicals in the air, as the MythBusters were able to prove in their test, although it took dozens of bug bombs to produce only a small explosion.

=== Talking to Plants ===
Myth statement	Status	Notes
Talking to plants helps them grow.	Plausible	Seven small greenhouses were set up on the M5 Industries roof. Four were set up with stereos playing endlessly looping recordings (as having the MythBusters actually talk to the plants could contaminate the samples with their expelled carbon dioxide): two of negative speech, two of positive speech (Kari and Scottie each made one positive- and one negative-inducing soundtrack), a fifth with classical music, and a sixth with intense death metal music. A seventh greenhouse, used as a control sample, had no stereo. Plants in the greenhouses with the recordings of speech grew better than the control, regardless of whether such talk was kind or angry. The plants in the greenhouse with the recording of classical music grew better, while those in the greenhouse with the recording of intense death metal grew best of all. During the course of the test, the battery died on one of the timers that was watering the plants, causing them to wilt, but as all the greenhouses were affected equally, the test was considered valid.

=== Needle in a Haystack ===
Adam and Jamie competed against each other in a contest to bust an old adage. While Jamie teamed up with Christine and Scottie in a machine known as Earth, Wind & Fire, which burned the hay to leave the needles behind, Adam, Kari, and Tory used the Needlefinder 2000, a machine that relied on water to separate needles from the hay (in the theory that needles would sink in water while hay floated). Each team had to locate four needles among ten bales of hay—three of steel of varying sizes and one of bone. Adam's team won the contest, in great part because his team's machine "processed" their haystack more quickly.

Myth statement	Status	Notes
Modern technology can render the phrase "like finding a needle in a haystack" obsolete.	Partly busted	While it is possible to find a needle in a haystack, even using specialized machines to do so takes a considerable amount of time, particularly since bone needles cannot be picked up by magnets. The task is difficult enough to still make the saying viable.

== Episode 24 – "Ming Dynasty Astronaut" ==
- Original air date: December 5, 2004

=== Ming Dynasty Astronaut ===
The MythBusters take on a story, taken from the 1945 book Rockets and Jets by Herbert Zim, which describes a Ming dynasty astrologer named Wan Hu, and determine whether he really was the first astronaut in space as a result.

Myth statement	Status	Notes
A 15th-century astrologer from China made it into space on a throne powered by 47 bamboo rockets.	Busted	The combined heat from all 47 gunpowder-powered bamboo rockets caused them to explode, nearly destroying the throne and doing significant damage to the stand-in astrologer (Buster) before it ever got off the ground. A throne powered by 47 modern I-power rocket engines shot violently to one side, due to uneven firing as well as weight balance, and did not have the thrust to lift the chair far or into space. When the testing of this myth was finished, Buster, who had been badly burned and severely damaged, had to be remade.

=== Free Energy ===
By far the most popular of the submitted myths are those regarding perpetual motion—it was claimed in an interview by Adam that there was enough material to create three seasons of busting potential-free energy machines. One test (different from the included radio device), cut for time and shown on "MythBusters Outtakes", involves coils of baling wire being used to siphon off electricity from nearby PG&E power lines in the Santa Cruz Mountains. Adam, Jamie, and MIT electrical engineer Dr. Geo Homsy tested whether real free energy can be obtained using the following, which tended to involve more well-known ideas:

Myth statement	Status	Notes
A "G-strain amplifier" by sucking power from the curvature of space	Busted	In a day-long comparative experiment, the G-strain amplifier was hooked up to a battery and motor and pitted against a control—simply a battery connected to a motor—and the amplifier petered out first. Adam declared that the amplifier ought to be referred to in perpetuity as a ring oscillator and that they ought to sue the people who charged for the plans.
A Minto wheel or temperature wheel	Busted	Adam and Scottie successfully constructed a Minto wheel and got it to turn, but it was extremely slow—and the fastest machine that Adam was able to research as powered by a Minto wheel was only 1 RPM—enough to fan sheep, as Adam said.
A radio wave energy extractor	Busted	This was a rare design in that it included parts as well as designs. It was claimed that if the box was assembled and connected to a 100-foot (30 m) antenna, it could power a clock radio. However, while radio waves can be converted to electricity, the assembly produced only half a Volt, meaning three would be needed to power the display of a digital watch and thus making it impractical.
The Bedini Motor or Energizer	Busted	The motor did not achieve its theoretical overunity, because the motor drained more power from the battery than it recharged and returned.

=== Killer Ceiling Fan ===
The myth of decapitation by jumping into a ceiling fan has two versions, both of which were tested: jumping up into the blades from below (via a kid jumping up and down on a bed), and jumping forward so as to carry the neck into the blades from the side (the so-called "lover's leap".) To test this, Kari and Scottie bought a regular house fan and an industrial fan (with a higher top speed and metal blades as opposed to wood), and then they and Tori encased pig spines and latex arteries filled with fake blood inside busts of Adam and added human craniums. They then added rigs for both scenarios.

Myth statement	Status	Notes
A regular house fan can cause decapitation.	Busted	House fans do not have the power even to inflict serious injury while spinning at top speed—they are more likely to break first. During their tests, the "jumping kid" scenario produced hardly any injury, while the "lover's leap" scenario resulted in the wooden fan blades breaking against the neck.
An industrial fan can cause decapitation.	Busted	Industrial fans are capable of inflicting severe lacerations when jumped into from below and caused a potentially lethal arterial severing when jumped into head on, but it is still not powerful enough to take a head off. For a finale, in an attempt to replicate the result, the Build Team created a razor-sharp, stainless steel fan powered by a lawn mower engine for the "lover's leap" scenario. Even that did not achieve decapitation, but it did cause lethal and horrifying injuries—deep cuts, sliced arteries, and cracked vertebrae—that compelled Adam to put it in the "MythBusters Hall of Fame."

== Episode SP1 – "Viewers-Choice/Christmas Special" ==
- Original air date: December 22, 2004

In this episode, Adam and Jamie test holiday-related myths while revealing the top-10 myths as voted upon by fans of the series. Clips were shown from each of these segments, in reverse order from #10 to #1.

1. Tree Cannon
2. Jet Assisted Chevy
3. Escape From Alcatraz
4. Stinky Car
5. Barrel of Bricks
6. Larry's Lawn Chair Balloon
7. Pop Rocks and Soda
8. Beat the Breath Test
9. Chicken Gun (clips from both the original test and the revisit are shown)
10. CD-ROM Shattering

Holiday Myths:

Myth statement	Status	Notes
A frozen turkey can explode if it is dropped into a deep fryer pot too fast.	Busted	While it will not explode, the turkey can cause the boiling oil to splash all over the place (which can be extremely dangerous) if it is dropped into the deep fryer improperly.
Placing a silver spoon in a bottle of champagne will make the bubbles last longer.	Busted	The spoon actually reduces the fizziness of champagne. In a blind taste test when compared to several controls (opened champagne, re-corked champagne, and unopened champagne), both Adam and Jamie ranked the spooned champagne the lowest in terms of fizziness.
A falling icicle can kill a person.	Confirmed	An icicle over 1.5 ft (0.46 m) in length falling from about 15 ft (4.6 m) completely penetrated a steak, showing it is possible for an icicle to kill a person.
A clothed snowman melts slower than a naked one.	Confirmed	In the 80 °F (27 °C) San Francisco summer heat, the naked snowman (representing Jamie) melted considerably faster than the clothed snowman (representing Adam). The clothes on the Adam snowman protected it from the heat and acted as insulation to help keep the temperature of the snow from rising.
A urine stream can freeze in the cold of winter.	Busted	When tested in a freezer at −70 °F (−57 °C), the fake urine stream the MythBusters used did not freeze in midair.
Lighting a fire in a fireplace with a chimney can make a house colder.	Confirmed	The living room was heated and the nearby kitchen remained unchanged, but other, more distant rooms got almost 3 °F (2 °C) colder.

== Mini Myth – "Busting the Egguinox Myth" ==
=== Egg-uinox ===
The Egg-uinox myth was perhaps too short to air in any episode, as it was easily and conclusively busted.

Myth statement	Status	Notes
An egg can be balanced on its ends only during the spring and fall equinoxes.	Busted	This is a Chinese folk belief, sometimes called Li Chun egg balancing after the first day of spring in the Chinese calendar. There is nothing special about the spring and fall equinoxes that allows an egg to balance on end. A person with enough dexterity can do it on any day of the year. Hard-boiled eggs balance better than raw eggs, however.
