= Ballistic gelatin =

Testing medium used in ballistics

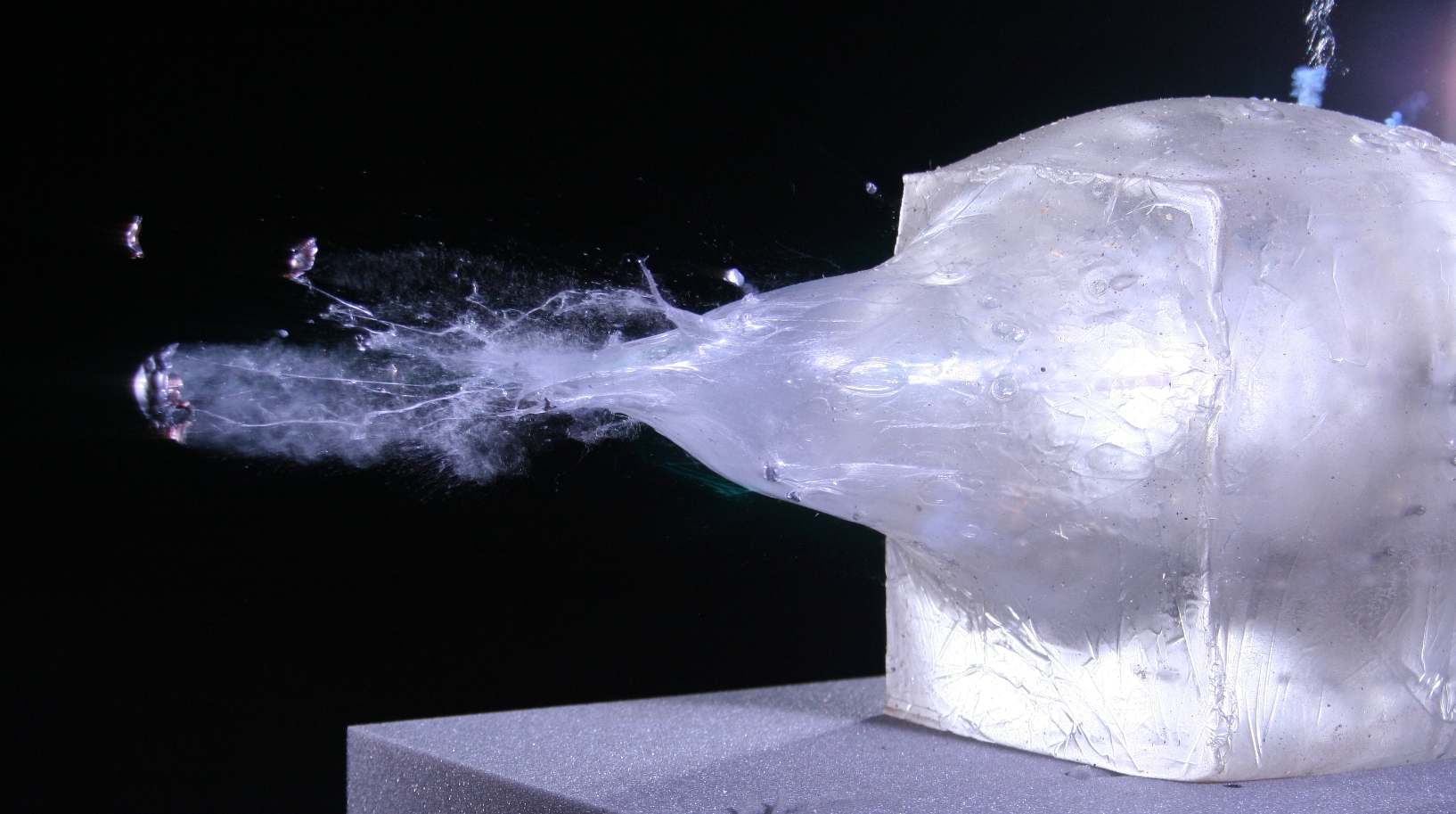
Photo of synthetic clear ballistic gel showing terminal fragmentation of a .243 projectile

Ballistic gelatin is a testing medium designed to simulate the effects of bullet wounds in animal muscle tissue. It was developed and improved by Martin Fackler and others in the field of wound ballistics. It is calibrated to match pig muscle, which is ballistically similar to human muscle tissue.

Ballistic gelatin is traditionally a solution of gelatin powder in water. Ballistic gelatin closely simulates the density and viscosity of human and animal muscle tissue, and is used as a standardized medium for testing the terminal performance of firearms ammunition. While ballistic gelatin does not model the tensile strength of muscles or the structures of the body such as skin and bones, it works fairly well as an approximation of tissue and provides similar performance for most ballistics testing; however, its usefulness as a model for very low velocity projectiles can be limited. Ballistic gelatin is used rather than actual muscle tissue due to the ability to carefully control the properties of the gelatin, which allows consistent and reliable comparison of terminal ballistics.

== History ==
The FBI introduced its own testing protocol in December 1988 as a response to the 1986 Miami shootout, and it quickly became popular among US law enforcement agencies.

== Preparation ==
=== Gelatin formula ===
The most commonly used formula is an FBI-style 10% ballistic gelatin, which is prepared by dissolving one part 250 bloom type A gelatin into nine parts of warm water (by mass), mixing the water while pouring in the powdered gelatin. It is chilled to 4 °C (39 °F). The older NATO formula specifies a 20% solution, chilled to 10 °C (50 °F), but that solution costs more to prepare, as it uses twice the amount of the gelatin.

In either case, a 1988 research paper by Martin Fackler recommends that the water should not be heated above 40 °C (104 °F), as this can cause a significant change in the ballistic performance. However, this result does not seem to be reproduced in a later study.

=== Calibration ===
To ensure accurate results, immediately prior to use, the gelatin block is calibrated by firing a standard .177 caliber (4.5 mm) steel BB from an air gun over a gun chronograph into the gelatin, and the depth of penetration measured. While the exact calibration methods vary slightly, the calibration method used by the United States Immigration and Naturalization Service's National Firearms Unit is fairly typical. It requires a velocity of 183 ± 3 m/s (600 ± 10 ft/s), and a BB penetration between 8.3 and 9.5 cm (3.3–3.7 in).

In his book Bullet Penetration, ballistics expert Duncan MacPherson describes a method that can be used to compensate for ballistic gelatin that gives a BB penetration that is off by several centimeters (up to two inches) in either direction. MacPherson's Figure 5-2, Velocity Variation Correction to Measured BB Penetration Depth, can be used to make corrections to BB penetration depth when measured BB velocity is within ±10 m/s of 180 m/s. This method can also be used to compensate for error within the allowed tolerance, and normalize results of different tests, as it is standard practice to record the exact depth of the calibration BB's penetration.

=== Synthetic alternative ===
Ballistic gels made from natural gelatin are typically clear yellow-brown in color, and are generally not re-usable. The more expensive synthetic substitutes are engineered to simulate the ballistic properties of natural gelatin, whilst initially being colorless and clear. Some synthetic gels are also re-usable, since they can be melted and reformed without affecting the ballistic properties of the gels.

==== Synthetic formula ====
Synthetic ballistic gels are typically made of an oil and a polymer instead of gelatin and water, most commonly used is white mineral oil and a styrene polymer blend, polymers used include:

1. styrene-butadiene-styrene polymers;
2. styrene isoprene-styrene polymers;
3. styrene-ethylene-butylene styrene polymers;
4. styrene-ethylenepropylene polymers;
5. styrene-ethylene butylene polymers;
6. styrene-butadiene polymers; and
7. styrene-isoprene polymers.

The gel usually includes about 12% to 22% by weight of the polymer, but it depends on what polymers is used.

Heating temperatures vary depending on what polymer and oil is used, but should never go over 275 °F (135 °C).

The polymer and oil solution is extremely sensitive to moisture - when moisture comes in contact with the solution, bubbles form when heat is applied.

Polymer should not be added to heated up oil like gelatin is to water; the polymer and oil should be mixed when no heat is present.

Dwell times are recommended after mixing the polymer and oil to prevent bubbles forming when heat is applied. These "dwell" times can go up to 12 hours if the air is above about 50 °F, or at the very least 24 hours if the air is at cooler temperatures.

These discoveries were made by Darryl D. Amick.

== Uses ==
Since ballistic gelatin mimics the properties of muscle tissue reasonably well, it is the preferred medium (over real porcine cadavers) for comparing the terminal performance of different expanding ammunition, such as hollow-point and soft-point bullets. These bullets use the hydraulic pressure of the tissue or gelatin to expand in diameter, limiting penetration and increasing the tissue damage along their path. While the Hague Convention restricts the use of such ammunition in warfare, it is commonly used by police and civilians in defensive weapons, as well as police sniper and hostage-rescue teams, where rapid disabling of the target and minimal risk of overpenetration are required to reduce collateral damage.

Bullets intended for hunting are also commonly tested in ballistic gelatin. A bullet intended for use hunting small vermin, such as prairie dogs, for example, needs to expand very quickly to have an effect before it exits the target, and must perform at higher velocities due to the use of lighter bullets in the cartridges. The same fast-expanding bullet used for prairie dogs would be considered inhumane for use on medium game animals like whitetail deer, where deeper penetration is needed to reach vital organs and assure a quick kill.

In television the MythBusters team sometimes used ballistics gel to aid in busting myths, but not necessarily involving bullets, including the exploding implants myth, the deadly card throw, and the ceiling fan decapitation. They sometimes placed real bones (from humans or pigs) or synthetic bones in the gel to simulate bone breaks as well.

The US television program Forged in Fire is also known to use ballistics gelatin, often creating entire human torsos and heads complete with simulated bones, blood, organs and intestines that are cast inside the gel. Various bladed weapons are then tested on the gel torso in order to simulate and record the destructive effects the weapons would have on a real human body.

== See also ==
- Terminal ballistics
