= Pocket Ref =

Small reference book by Thomas J. Glover

- Author: Thomas J. Glover
- Subject: Science and engineering reference, general reference
- Published: 1989 (Sequoia Publishing)
- Pages: 864 (4th ed.)
- ISBN: 978-1-885071-62-0

Pocket Ref is a general-purpose pocket-sized reference book composed of various tips, tables, maps, formulas, constants and conversions, compiled by Thomas J. Glover. It is published by Sequoia Publishing, and is currently in its fourth edition at 864 pages in length, released in late 2010.

It contains references, tables, and instructional guides on such varied subjects as automotive repair; carpentry and construction; chemistry and physics; computers; physical, chemical, and mathematical constants; electronics; money and measurement conversions; advanced first aid; glue, solvents, paints, and finishes; hardware; mine, mill, and aggregate; plumbing; zip codes; rope, cable, and knots; steel and metals; surveying and mapping; and various other topics.

The Pocket Ref has been featured on the television series MythBusters. In the "Shop 'til You Drop" episode, Adam Savage noted that "nearly everyone" had asked him about the little black book.

The book can sometimes be found imprinted with the name of a store or other third party on its front cover.

Although the Pocket Ref is printed on very thin paper, its page count is still limited by the publisher's desire for it to fit in an average shirt pocket, so a more comprehensive work, at 1280 pages, DeskRef, has been published.

Other books by Glover include Pocket PC Ref, Deskref, Handyman In-Your-Pocket, Pocket Do It Yourself Source, Measure for Measure and Tech Ref.

Comparable books include AutoRef by Glover's sometimes-coauthor Richard A. Young, and Pocket Partner "a comprehensive collection of vital information for law enforcement personnel" by Dennis Evers.

== Reception ==
Nick Stockton, writing for Wired, included it in their list of favourites.
