= Baling wire =

Type of wire used in agriculture and industry

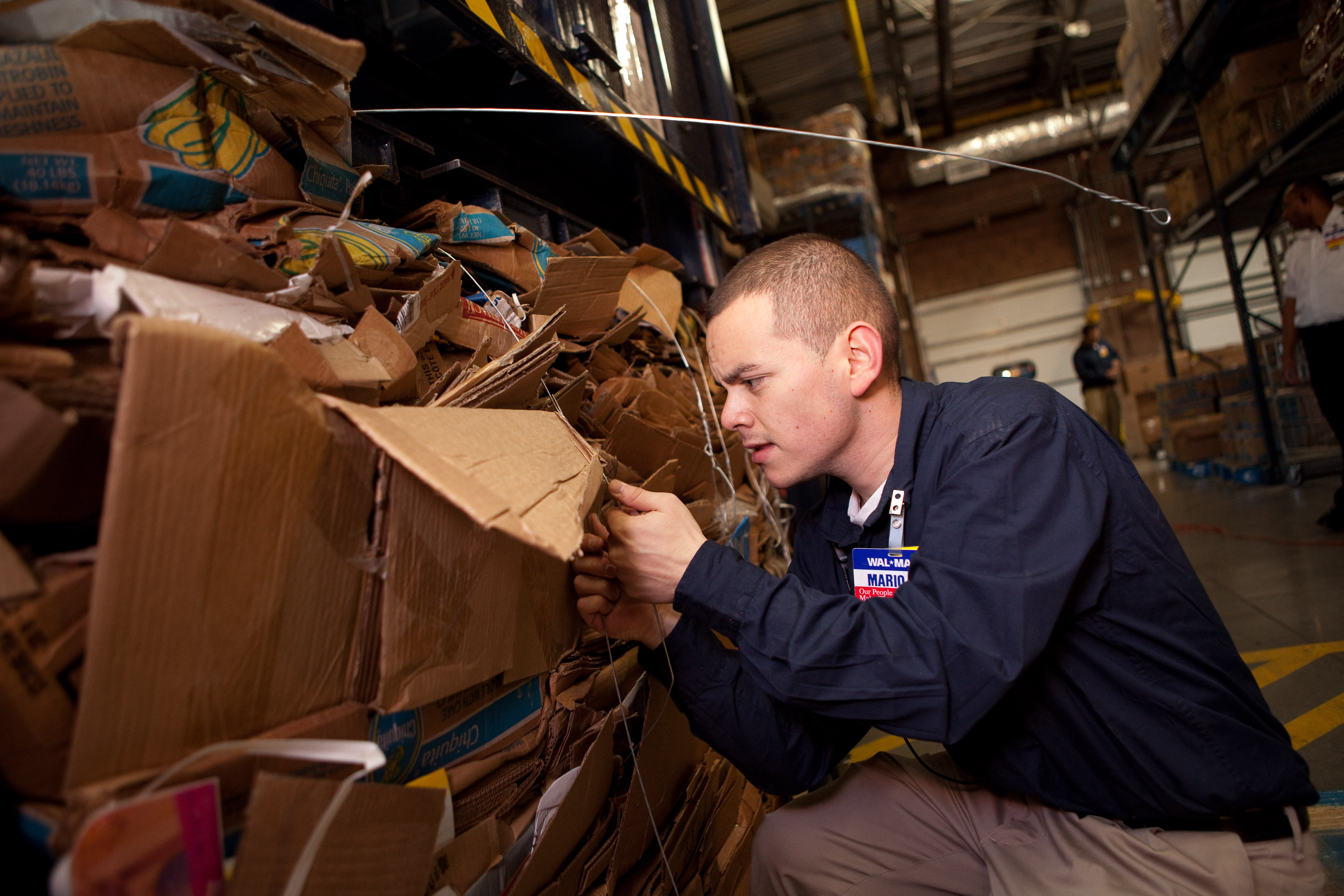
Baling wire in use

Baling wire, otherwise known as bale wire, farm wire, haywire, or soft wire, is a type of wire used in agriculture and industry for many uses such as mending fences or manually binding rectangular bales of hay, straw, or cut grass. It is also used in many non-agricultural applications, such as banding together corrugated cardboard, paper, textiles, aluminum and other materials that are processed in the recycling industry.

== Terminology and description ==
Baling wire is a type of wire also known as bale wire, farm wire, haywire, or soft wire.

== Uses ==
Baling wire is used in agriculture and industry for many uses, including mending fences or manually binding rectangular bales of hay, straw, or cut grass. It is also used in many non-agricultural applications such as banding together corrugated cardboard, paper, textiles, aluminum and other materials that are processed in the recycling industry.

In the United States, Australia, and around the world, baling wire was used in mechanical hay balers pulled behind a tractor. The automated balers used a wire twister that first cut then twisted the ends of the wire such that the bale kept its shape after the baler had pressed the hay into a tight rectangular bale. These hay balers were in common use until the late 1980s. When the hay was fed to livestock the wire was cut and often hung in bundles or stored in barrels or metal drums around the farm. Farmers used the soft wire for temporary repairs of a wide variety of objects on the farm, such as fences, leather horse harnesses, head stalls and bridles, or as pins to keep castellated nuts in place on the tractor. Even small screwdrivers could be made by cutting a short length of wire and looping one end for grip. The other end was then flattened and shaped to make a screwdriver.

Baling wire (or similar small-gauge wire) is sometimes used in an informal, make-do manner as an easy fix. Typical uses include supporting loose mufflers and patching chain-link fences.

== Slang ==
Baling wire is also known as "haywire", from which several slang terms have arisen. The term "to go haywire", meaning to go wrong or behave unpredictably, arose either from the wire's tendency to become entangled if improperly handled, or from the wire's use to fix anything in an ad hoc manner.

== See also ==
- Baling twine
- Number 8 wire
