= Brown note =

Urban myth

The brown note (sometimes brown tone or frequency) is a fictional infrasonic frequency capable of causing fecal incontinence by creating acoustic resonance in the human bowel. Considered an urban myth, the name is a metonym for the common color of human faeces. Attempts to demonstrate the existence of a "brown note" using sound waves transmitted through the air have failed.

Frequencies supposedly involved are between 5 and 9 Hz, which are below the lower frequency limit of human hearing. High-power sound waves below 20 Hz are felt in the body.

== Physiological effects of low frequency vibration ==
Air is a very inefficient medium for transferring low frequency vibration from a transducer to the human body. Mechanical connection of the vibration source to the human body, however, provides a potentially dangerous combination. The U.S. space program, worried about the harmful effects of rocket flight on astronauts, ordered vibration tests that used cockpit seats mounted on vibration tables to transfer "brown note" and other frequencies directly to the human subjects. Very high power levels of 160 dB were achieved at frequencies of 2–3 Hz. Test frequencies ranged from 0.5 Hz to 40 Hz. Test subjects suffered motor ataxia, nausea, visual disturbance, degraded task performance and difficulties in communication. These tests are assumed by researchers to be the nucleus of the current urban myth.

== Testing by Mythbusters ==
In February 2005, the television show MythBusters attempted to verify whether the "brown note" was a reality.

They used twelve Meyer Sound 700-HP subwoofers—a model and quantity that has been employed for major rock concerts. Normal operating frequency range of the selected subwoofer model was 28 Hz to 150 Hz but the 12 enclosures at MythBusters had been specially modified for deeper bass extension. Roger Schwenke and John Meyer directed the Meyer Sound team in devising a special test rig that would produce very high sound levels at infrasonic frequencies. The subwoofers' tuning ports were blocked and their input cards were altered. The modified cabinets were positioned in an open ring configuration, in four stacks, with each stack containing three subwoofers. Test signals were generated by a SIM 3 audio analyzer, with its software modified to produce infrasonic tones. A Brüel & Kjær sound level analyzer, fed with an attenuated signal from a model 4189 measurement microphone, displayed and recorded sound pressure levels.

The hosts on the show tried a series of frequencies as low as 5 Hz, attaining a level of 120 decibels of sound pressure at 9 Hz and up to 153 dB at frequencies above 20 Hz, but the rumored physiological effects did not materialize. The test subjects all reported some physical anxiety and shortness of breath, even a small amount of nausea, but this was dismissed by the hosts, noting that sound at that frequency and intensity moves air rapidly in and out of one's lungs. The show declared the brown note myth "busted".

== See also ==
- Acoustic resonance
- The Mosquito – A commercial device that deters loitering by emitting sound with a very high frequency
- The Republic XF-84H – An experimental aircraft that produced enough noise to cause headaches, nausea and seizures among its ground crew
- Tesla's oscillator – A vibrating machine which is claimed to have the effect of a "mechanical laxative", causing subjects to run straight to the bathroom after use
- "World Wide Recorder Concert" – A South Park episode involving a fictional brown note
