= MythBusters (2011 season) =

- No. of episodes: 22 (includes 3 specials)

Release
- Original network: Discovery Channel
- Original release: April 6 – November 30, 2011

Season chronology
- ← Previous; 2010 season Next → 2012 season

The cast of the television series MythBusters perform experiments to verify or debunk urban legends, old wives' tales, and the like. This is a list of the myths tested on the show as well as the results of the experiments (the myth is Busted, Plausible, or Confirmed). On March 16, 2011, Discovery Channel announced that the 2011 season would commence airing on April 6, 2011.

== Episode overview ==
No. overall	No. in season	Title	Original release date	Overall episode No.
160	1	"Mission Impossible Mask"	April 6, 2011	175
Myths tested: Can realistic facial masks be used to bypass security measures as shown in the Mission: Impossible television series? Is it possible to start a merry-go-round spinning by shooting bullets at it, as depicted in Shoot 'Em Up? Is it possible to knock a dropped gun out of reach by hitting it with bullets fired from another one?
161	2	"Blue Ice"	April 13, 2011	176
Myths tested: Can a magazine and toaster be used to blow up a room full of flammable gas, as depicted in The Bourne Supremacy? Can the contents of an airplane toilet leak out mid-flight and freeze into a lethal projectile?
162	3	"Running on Water"	April 20, 2011	177
Myths tested: Can a combination of footwear and technique allow a person to run on water? Can a person survive an explosion by hiding behind a table, a car, a dumpster, or a cinderblock wall?
163	4	"Bubble Trouble"	April 27, 2011	178
Myths tested: Can a person swim through bubbling water? Can an arrow with explosives split a tree in two?
164	5	"Torpedo Tastic"	May 4, 2011	179
Myths tested: Did the Syrians design a water-skimming torpedo as early as the 13th century? If a truckload of wine catches fire, will the bottles blow their corks 100 feet and sound like a machine gun?
165	6	"Blow Your Own Sail"	May 11, 2011	180
Myths tested: How well do movie sound effects compare to their real-world counterparts? Can a sailboat stranded in calm water start moving by blowing air into its sail with an onboard fan?
166	7	"Spy Car 2"	May 18, 2011	181
Myths tested: Can wheel spikes and a hood-mounted machine gun be used to disable a pursuing vehicle? Can a bullet spin in place after being fired onto the surface of a frozen lake?
167	8	"Dodge a Bullet"	June 1, 2011	182
Myths tested: Can a person dodge a bullet after it has been fired at him? Can a fall into water inflict the same injuries as one onto pavement from the same height?
168	9	"Fixing a Flat"	June 8, 2011	183
Myths tested: What can a driver use to replace a flat tire without a spare? Can a fishing reel catch fire with a fast enough fish on the line?
SP15	Special–1	"Planes, Trains, and Automobiles"	June 15, 2011	184
The MythBusters discuss 12 favorite myths involving forms of transportation. Note: This is a special episode.
169	10	"Let There Be Light"	June 22, 2011	185
Myths tested: Can mirrors be used to reflect sunlight and illuminate a tomb, as depicted in The Mummy? Can a runaway car be safely stopped if another driver pulls in front and slows down?
170	11	"Paper Armor"	June 29, 2011	186
Myths tested: Can a swimmer increase his chances of surviving an underwater explosion by floating at the surface? Did armies in ancient China use paper armor that was as effective as steel?
171	12	"Bikes and Bazookas"	September 28, 2011	187
Myths tested: Is a motorcycle more environmentally friendly than a car? Can a bullet take out an RPG?
172	13	"Newton's Crane Cradle"	October 5, 2011	188
Myths tested: Will a super-sized Newton's cradle work? Can the weight of a bird be enough to tip a teetering car off a cliff?
173	14	"Walk a Straight Line"	October 12, 2011	189
Myths tested: Is it impossible for humans to walk in a straight line without a point of reference? Will binary explosives explode in the case of a fender bender?
174	15	"Duct Tape Plane"	October 19, 2011	190
Myths tested: Can excavators row a barge, take you wakeboarding, or do acrobatics? Can you patch the fuselage of a plane with duct tape?
175	16	"Flying Guillotine"	October 26, 2011	191
Myths tested: Can C4 be used as a cooking fuel? Can you make a throwing weapon that could decapitate an opponent and carry the head back to the thrower?
176	17	"Drain Disaster"	November 2, 2011	192
Myths tested: Will an explosion in a sewer launch a manhole cover as seen in many Hollywood films? Can truck bedliner withstand a car crash, a dog bite, and an explosion?
SP16	Special–2	"Location, Location, Location"	November 9, 2011	193
The MythBusters discuss 12 favorite locations they have used for testing myths in the past. Note: This is a special episode.
SP17	Special–3	"Wet and Wild"	November 16, 2011	194
The MythBusters count down their 12 favorite water-based myths from prior episodes. Note: This is a special episode.
177	18	"Wheel of Mythfortune"	November 23, 2011	195
Myths tested: Is it possible to re-inflate a flat tire and re-seat it on its rim by spraying in engine starting fluid and igniting it? How effective are various handgun firing stances? If a live grenade lands near a person, can he avoid shrapnel injuries by lying flat on the ground? Do people presented with the Monty Hall problem tend to stick with their first choice? Would people presented with the Monty Hall problem be more likely to win if they changed their decision?
178	19	"Toilet Bomb"	November 30, 2011	196
Myths tested: If a pressure-triggered bomb is cooled with liquid nitrogen, can its detonation be delayed long enough for a person to seek protection, as seen in Lethal Weapon 2? Can airplanes save fuel by flying in a V-formation like a flock of birds?

== Episode 160 – "Mission Impossible Mask" ==
- Original air date: April 6, 2011

=== Mission Impossible Face Off ===
Myth statement	Status	Notes
With a realistic mask and good impersonation skills, a person can fool a security guard into believing he is someone else (based on scenes in the Mission: Impossible TV series and films).	Plausible	Adam and Jamie visited a special-effects shop to have rubber full-head masks made of themselves, based on photos and measurements of their faces. They then worked with professional acting coach Terry McGovern to learn how to impersonate each other's voice and body language. Adam and Jamie then donned each other's mask and clothing, with padding as needed to match each other's body shape. They directed six volunteers (who were fans of the show) to approach them, starting from 90 feet and ending at 5 feet, while using an unrelated task to mask the nature of the test. Three worked with "Jamie", three worked with "Adam", and all six quickly detected the deception as soon as the imposter spoke. Six more volunteers then took part in a test in which the disguised hosts did not speak; none of them suspected anything until they came face-to-face with the imposter. Grant and Kari, both thoroughly familiar with Jamie's appearance and behavior, took part in a similar test, with subtle changes in "Jamie's" wardrobe as distractions. Neither of them identified him as a fake until they were 5 feet away, though Kari expressed some doubt at 70 feet. Adam and Jamie classified the myth as plausible, depending on the circumstances under which the deception is carried out.

=== Firearms Force ===
Myth statement	Status	Notes
It is possible to knock a dropped gun out of reach by shooting it with another one.	Confirmed	The Build Team chose three surfaces for testing—a dirt road, asphalt pavement, and a tile floor—and used a typical 9 mm pistol as a target. Grant tested the friction forces on each surface and found that the dirt and asphalt required 1.5 pounds of force to move the pistol, while the tile required 0.5 pounds of force. Using a Glock 9 mm pistol, the team was able to move the target gun a total of 16 feet in all three cases (six shots for dirt, four for asphalt, three for tile). They attributed this result to the effective transfer of kinetic energy from the bullet to the target.
It is possible to start a playground merry-go-round spinning by shooting it (inspired by a scene in the film Shoot 'Em Up).	Busted	The Build Team built a merry-go-round, placed it on a firing range, and found that 8.6 pounds of force were needed to get it to start turning. They then fired weapons at the outer portion of the handrails: a Glock 9 mm pistol, a Smith & Wesson .44 Magnum, and a .45 pistol. None of their shots turned the merry-go-round more than a fraction of an inch, but they did punch holes through the rails. A 12-gauge shotgun loaded with deer slugs gave the same result. The team added steel plates to the rails in an attempt to stop the bullets and force them to transfer their energy to the merry-go-round. After making this change, they tried another deer slug and managed to turn it by 1.5 inches; a shot from an Armalite AR-50 rifle turned it 8 inches and knocked one of the plates off. At this point, the team declared the myth busted and set about replicating the results, with Tory redesigning the merry-go-round's bearing system to reduce friction and Kari and Grant attaching more bullet-stopping plates. They were finally able to keep the device turning with steady streams of 12-gauge deer slugs and .416 Barrett rifle fire.

== Episode 161 – "Blue Ice" ==
- Original air date: April 13, 2011

=== Bourne Magazine ===
Myth statement	Status	Notes
A room filled with flammable gas can be made to explode by placing a magazine in a kitchen toaster and turning it on (based on a scene in the film The Bourne Supremacy).	Busted	Adam and Jamie began by placing magazines of varying thicknesses in toasters and timing how long they took to catch fire. The thinnest ones, similar to common newsprint or comic books, took roughly 2 minutes to burn rather than the 20–30 seconds observed in the film. Small-scale tests with mixtures of methane and air indicated that a methane level as low as 6% (the bottom end of its flammability range) could trigger a noticeable explosion. For full-scale testing, they built a replica of Jason Bourne's apartment, as seen in the film, and set up the toaster, magazine, and gas supply. Their first attempt, which exactly replicated the scene from the film, had no effect whatsoever, with the magazine completely burning away well before the gas concentration could reach explosive levels. On their second trial, they placed a firestarter log in the middle of the room and allowed the gas to gradually build up to explosive levels. The mixture did eventually ignite, creating a small explosion that partly blew out a wall and gave way to an intense fire that destroyed most of the furniture. Adam and Jamie declared the myth busted and made one last attempt, using enough methane to achieve a 9% concentration (the center of the flammability range) and a set of fans and diffuser hoses to mix the gas and air thoroughly, before lighting the gas mix with a specialized device. This time, they were able to get one wall to blow out and set the apartment on fire.

=== Blue Ice ===
Myth statement	Status	Notes
If the contents of an airplane toilet are jettisoned mid-flight, they can freeze into a solid mass capable of inflicting severe injury upon hitting the ground.	Confirmed	Kari spoke with an airplane technician and learned that although a pilot cannot dump the toilet mid-flight, the contents can leak out if certain valves and seals fail. The Build Team put together a section of a plane fuselage with a toilet outlet designed to suffer a slow or sudden leak as needed. Grant and Tory visited a NASA research center and placed the rig in a tunnel designed to replicate the high wind speeds and cold temperatures typical of airplane cruising altitudes. When the toilet was dumped all at once, the liquid quickly atomized in the wind, leaving only a thin film to freeze on the fuselage. However, a slow leak allowed the ice to build up into a large mass that did not break loose until the rig "descended" to 12,000 feet. To determine the ability of such a chunk to survive a fall to earth, Kari and a skydiver flew up to that altitude, threw a 35-pound ice block out of the plane, and jumped out after it as Grant and Tory tracked it from the ground. The block did not suffer any significant melting or damage during the fall or impact, prompting the team to declare the myth confirmed but unlikely due to the number of safeguards that would need to fail simultaneously to achieve the result.

== Episode 162 – "Running on Water" ==
- Original air date: April 20, 2011

=== Running on Water ===
Myth statement	Status	Notes
It is possible to run across the surface of a body of water through a combination of footwear and running technique (inspired by a viral video).	Busted	Adam and Jamie found a lake similar to the one shown in the video and laid a strip of turf to its edge in order to ensure good traction. Wearing the same type of water-repellent shoes, they each made several runs but wound up in the water each time. They brought in Olympic sprinter Wallace Spearmon, thinking that increased speed would help, but he also failed. After studying film footage of a basilisk running on water, Adam and Jamie decided to build separate footwear rigs to duplicate its leg movements. They called in Jessica Fortunato, a trained acrobat and gymnast, and had her try the rigs: Adam's with hinged foot platforms and a long tail, and Jamie's with concave foot cups and an outrigger frame held in front. She was unable to stay above water, whether unaided or using either of the rigs. At this point, Adam and Jamie declared the myth busted and built a submersible bridge to replicate the results. After camouflaging it and setting up the camera at a particular angle, both were able to run across the surface until they went off the end of the bridge.

=== What Is Bombproof? ===
The Build Team investigated the ability of everyday objects to reduce the likelihood of injury or death from an explosion. They began by detonating a 3-pound (1.4 kg) charge of C-4, with rupture disks at various distances set to burst at 13 psi (90 kPa) (injury) and 75 psi (517 kPa) (instant death). Distances of 10 and 20 ft (3.0 and 6.1 m) were found to be the thresholds of the death and injury zones, respectively, due to the blast shock wave.

For each object tested, the team placed it at 10 and 20 feet, with rupture disks and a foam-cutout figure (to gauge shrapnel injuries) protected by it. They evaluated the question of surviving the shock wave by taking cover behind...

Myth statement	Status	Notes
...a wooden table.	Confirmed	The tables were placed on their sides, facing the blast, and the disks and figures were set behind them. Both figures were broken in the blast. The 10 ft (3.0 m) table was destroyed, but the disks did not burst. At 20 ft (6.1 m), the table was heavily damaged; the "injury" disk did not burst, but it did buckle noticeably. The team noted that shrapnel from the splintered table might cause injury or death independently of the shock wave.
...a car.	Confirmed	The cars were placed to present one side toward the blast, with the disks and figures behind the front end. No injury was noted at 20 feet, while only the "injury" disk burst at 10 feet.
...a metal dumpster.	Confirmed	The disks and figures were placed inside the dumpsters. The team observed the same results as for the car and noted that the side toward the blast showed some deformation.
...a cinderblock wall.	Confirmed	Since the team had only enough time and materials to build one wall, they moved the blast site as needed to achieve the 10- and 20-foot distances. The 20-foot test was performed first; the wall stood, and the disk deformed but did not burst. After the wall was repaired, the 10-foot blast collapsed it and crushed the figure. However, the disks remained intact.

== Episode 163 – "Bubble Trouble" ==
- Original air date: April 27, 2011

=== Bubble Trouble ===
Myth statement	Status	Notes
It is impossible to swim in bubbling water.	Plausible	In a small-scale test, Adam built a crude hydrometer, weighted to float at a certain height, and placed it in a fishtank full of water. The device did not sink when he bubbled air in, but he and Jamie thought that this was the result of upward water currents. Jamie then built a larger bubbler to place in the 10,000-gallon tank used in the "Whirlpool of Death" myth, and Adam donned a wetsuit and carried enough weights to leave only his head above the surface. When the bubbler was turned on, the upwelling pushed him to one side, where he sank in a downward current. In order to eliminate these wall effects, Adam and Jamie built a 4-by-16-foot bubbler to place at the bottom of a swimming pool. After they added weights to keep the rig from floating up, Adam tried to swim across the pool and back through the bubbles. The trip proved difficult at 25% power and impossible at 100%. Adam and Jamie classified the myth as plausible but for a different reason from the one expected—water currents holding the swimmer at the surface, rather than a density reduction causing him/her to sink.

=== Dynamite Axe ===
Myth statement	Status	Notes
If a stick of dynamite is attached to an arrow and shot into a tree, it will split the tree down the middle when it explodes.	Busted	To simulate a real tree, the Build Team dug a hole in the ground and stood a 20-foot, 6,000-pound pine log in it. They set up a remote-controlled rig to fire an arrow fitted with a binary explosive charge equivalent to a stick of dynamite. Tests with a single and double charge failed to damage the log, so the team stuck an arrow into the wood by hand and attached six charges. This attempt also did not result in a split; Grant commented that the placement of the explosive outside the tree surface prevented its force from being channeled into the wood. Declaring the myth busted, the team did some small-scale tests with different explosives and placement techniques. A TNT charge drilled into the trunk shredded it at the blast point, while an ANFO charge laid in grooves cut along the wood grain caused some degree of splitting. In one last full-scale test, the team chose a 100-foot Ponderosa pine and fitted it with 25 pounds of ANFO, laid in grooves cut near the core. The resulting blast tore the tree into hundreds of pieces.

== Episode 164 – "Torpedo Tastic" ==
- Original air date: May 4, 2011

=== Torpedo-Tastic ===
Myth statement	Status	Notes
13th-century Syrians designed a torpedo-like weapon that could skim over the surface of a body of water and explode on impact.	Plausible	Examining historical records, Adam and Jamie found that the weapon had a pear-shaped upper hull, with rear stabilizing fins and a propellant equivalent to 20 lb (9 kg) of black powder. They each built prototypes with different lower hulls and tested them for accuracy, with Jamie's flat-bottom craft traveling straighter than Adam's V-hull design. Adam and Jamie built several full-scale torpedoes, took them to a lake, and set up a target ship 800 ft (244 m) from shore. Two accuracy tests—first with the full propellant charge (as a rocket motor), then with a reduced one—caused the torpedo to go airborne and miss the target completely. For the next two trials on payload delivery, they used a tether to guide the torpedo, but they were unable to score a hit even after they moved the ship to within 200 ft (61 m) of shore. Finally, they removed the tether and reduced the rocket power further, allowing them to hit the ship and set it on fire with the incendiary payload. They classified the myth as plausible, since they could find no record of the device being used in combat.

=== Exploding Wine ===
Myth statement	Status	Notes
If a truck filled with bottled wine catches fire, the heat can cause the corks to blow out and fly 100 ft (30 m), sounding similar to a machine gun (based on published accounts of such an accident).	Busted	MythBusters champagne gatling gun After visiting a local winery to find out about what could make a wine bottle blow its cork, the Build Team decided to investigate wine/bottle type and temperature in the shop. They placed each bottle on a burner and measured the distance each cork flew. Chilling the bottles increased the distance due to the higher pressure rise caused by the larger temperature change. The best performers of the still and sparkling wines were Riesling (30 ft (9 m)) and champagne (50 ft (15 m)), respectively, with the difference due to the high pressure under which champagne is bottled. For a full-scale test, the team loaded a semi trailer with 1,000 bottles of champagne and some Riesling, then set fire to it. All three agreed that the sound of the exploding corks resembled machine guns or firecrackers; however, no corks flew farther than 50 feet. Based on this result, the team declared the myth busted, then set up a Gatling gun–like rig to rotate the bottles over a burner and launch their corks straight ahead. Grant, dressed in a fire suit, stood in front of the rig and took several direct hits.

== Episode 165 – "Blow Your Own Sail" ==
- Original air date: May 11, 2011

=== Sounds Bogus ===
Adam and Jamie compared movie sound effects to their real-world counterparts by recording samples of both. They looked into the realistic nature of...

Myth statement	Status	Notes
...a punch.	Busted	They first hung up a pig carcass and took turns punching it, but they had to pull their punches in order to keep from injuring their hands. The results did not resemble the movie sound effects, so Adam attached a ballistic-gelatin fist to a baseball bat and swung it at the carcass full force, with similar results. Sound designer Steve Boeddeker explained that the movie punch was heavily manipulated and built up from various sounds to build drama.
...a reloading gun. (Not in the version of the episode aired in the US.)	Confirmed	Adam cocked a .45 caliber pistol, and its sound closely matched its movie counterpart. Steve explained that this is because modern sound engineers can record sounds of actual guns and save those sounds in a digital library for future use. This can apply to any gun regardless of size and caliber.
...a rattlesnake's rattle.	Confirmed	Owen Maercks, a snake expert, brought in a rattlesnake and coaxed it to shake its tail, producing a sound very close to its movie counterpart.
...a gun fitted with a suppressor.	Plausible	Adam and Jamie visited a shooting range and fired .45 caliber and 9mm pistols, both with and without suppressors. With the help of sound expert Roger Schwenke, they found that the suppressor reduced the sound level considerably, from 161 to 126 decibels for the .45. The movie sound effect was not a perfect match, but it did have enough similarity to result in a "plausible" verdict.
...an explosion.	Busted	In the opening sequence of the myth, Jamie blew up a car rigged with primer cord and 2 US gal (8 L) gallons of gasoline. He, Adam, and Roger observed that the movie explosion had a longer duration and covered a wider range of frequencies. A second attempt, using 2.2 lb (1 kg) of C-4, gave a more substantial blast but still did not match the movie.

=== Blow Your Own Sail ===
Myth statement	Status	Notes
A sailboat stranded in calm water can move forward by using an onboard fan to blow air into the sail.	Confirmed	The Build Team set up small-scale tests in the shop, using a wheeled cart on a tabletop, and Kari found that a forward-facing model airplane propeller could generate enough thrust to push it backward. However, after Grant fitted a sail onto the cart, the prop could not move it due to the equal and opposite forces acting on the ship and the blown air. With smaller sails and higher prop speeds, the cart rolled backward once air began to spill around the sail edges. The combination of a large sail and an elevated fan did result in the cart moving forward; Grant theorized that this was caused by the sail "reflecting" a portion of the prop's thrust backward (in fact, the air hitting the sail flows outwards, towards the top, bottom, and sides, but, due to the sail's curvature, the flow is angled slightly backwards). A larger-scale test, with a small jet engine mounted on a skateboard and using a fire-resistant sail, gave the same effect. Finally, the team set up a full-scale test on a lake, using a swamp boat with a 40-horsepower fan. The boat reached a speed of 20 mph (32 km/h) with the fan facing backward and the sail not in use. After the fan was reversed and the sail was hoisted, the boat traveled forward at 3 mph (5 km/h) once the team fine-tuned the fan's aim. All tests used a basic square sail design.

== Episode 166 – "Spy Car 2" ==
- Original air date: May 18, 2011

=== Spy Car: The Revenge ===
A twist on "Spy Car Escape", with the focus on offensive rather than defensive methods to disable an enemy car. Adam and Jamie tested the use of...

Myth statement	Status	Notes
...wheel-mounted spikes.	Confirmed	Jamie built replicas of wheel spikes from the films Goldfinger (a small blade wheel on a long central shaft) and The Green Hornet (a crown-like assembly on the hubcap). He and Adam drove side by side at 40 mph (64 km/h), with Jamie using a set of devices on his passenger-side tires to damage Adam's driver's side as much as possible over 500 yd (457 m). Both film designs shredded at least one of Adam's tires and left deep gouges in the bodywork. Jamie then built a new device from a short pipe the same diameter as the hubcap, with the free end sharpened into blades. This design tore up Adam's bodywork, popped one tire, and pulled the other one off its rim, leaving the car sitting on its chassis.
...a hood-mounted machine gun.	Confirmed	Adam built two mounts to hold a fully automatic paintball gun on the hood of a car—one for a fixed position, and another that could be aimed with a joystick and camera/monitor system. He and Jamie did a control run, with Adam driving and shooting at a target vehicle with a handheld semiautomatic gun, but scored only one glancing hit. Next, Adam mounted a gun and a full ammunition hopper on his hood and chased Jamie, who drove a target car with the rear windshield removed. He was able to riddle the rear end and hit Jamie's head and seat a few times with the fixed mount; in the aimed-mount test, he got so many hits in such a short time that Jamie called an early end to the run.

=== Spinning Ice Bullets ===
Myth statement	Status	Notes
A bullet fired into the surface of a frozen lake can spin like a top on impact (inspired by a viral video).	Confirmed	The testing for this myth began during the summer, with Tory building a rig to hold a pistol at any desired angle and Kari checking the video to work out the geometry of the shot. The Build Team then laid down blocks of ice and dry ice on a rifle range to simulate the frozen lake and tried several shots with a Glock 9 mm pistol. Direct hits left bullets embedded in the ice, while shallow ricochets left the team unable to find the bullets at all. After re-checking their own footage, the team heard a sound that might have been a spinning bullet. Once winter came, they visited Caples Lake in the Sierra Nevada and dug out a target area on its frozen surface for further work. Testing gave no results until they aimed at the center of their target site, allowing for a backward ricochet instead of a forward one. The team found the bullets from these last tests to be spinning in place on their sides, leading them to declare the myth confirmed.

== Episode 167 – "Dodge a Bullet" ==
- Original air date: June 1, 2011

=== Dodge a Bullet ===
Myth statement	Status	Notes
It is possible to dodge a bullet if the shooter is far enough away from his intended target. This myth was chosen for testing by viewers.	Busted	Adam and Jamie called in U.S. Army sniper Dave Liwanag for some preliminary tests to measure the time it took for a bullet to reach its target. After some failed attempts, they obtained travel times of 231, 597, and 1,791 ms for 200, 500, and 1,200 yd (183, 457, and 1,097 m), respectively. Next, the pair did some workshop tests to find how quickly they could dodge a shot, using a camera flash to simulate the muzzle flash. Jamie proved slightly faster, dodging in 490 ms; based on that result, he and Adam calculated that the shooter would have to be at least 400 yd (366 m) away. Adam and Jamie then watched Dave fire standard blank cartridges from various distances and found that they could not see his muzzle flash at all past 200 yd (183 m). When he switched to Hollywood-style blanks with much heavier gunpowder loads, they could easily see the flash out to 1,200 yd (1,097 m). Finally, they set up a blank-firing rifle at 200 yards, wired to a timer and paintball gun; when one man pulled the trigger, a paintball would be fired directly at the other's chest after 231 ms. Neither was able to dodge any shots until the rifle was moved to 500 yd (457 m) (600 ms delay) and loaded with Hollywood blanks. Adam and Jamie declared the myth busted, since an actual sniper would take precautions to ensure that the target would not see the muzzle flash (including a flash suppressor).

=== Water = Pavement ===
Myth statement	Status	Notes
A person who falls from a great enough height into water will sustain the same injuries as if he or she had landed on pavement.	Busted	The Build Team fitted Buster with accelerometers, hauled him up with a construction crane, and dropped him feet first onto pavement and water. Drops from 25 ft (8 m) gave g-force measurements of 60 g on pavement but less than 25 g on water (the lower threshold that the instruments could measure). At 75 ft (23 m), the team obtained a reading of 29 g for water but over 500 g for pavement (the upper measuring limit). To investigate the effect of body surface area on impact forces, the team did more drops with Buster in a belly-flop position. Pavement and water drops from 25 feet gave 286 g and 115 g, respectively, while 50 ft (15 m) drops maxed out the instrument (pavement) and registered 220 g (water). For a final test at terminal velocity, roughly 120 miles per hour, Tory threw two pig carcasses out of a helicopter at 600 ft (183 m), after which they were X-rayed to determine injuries. The pavement drop resulted in 17 fractures, a shattered pelvis, and a decapitation, while the water drop yielded seven fractures and a broken neck. Since no water landing produced the same level of impact force or injury as a fall from the same height onto pavement, the team declared the myth busted.

== Episode 168 – "Fixing a Flat" ==
- Original air date: June 8, 2011

=== Fixin’ a Flat ===
Adam and Jamie tested three impromptu remedies for a flat tire in the wilderness, without a spare being available. At a 2-mile off-road hazard course, they set up a typical highway vehicle and cut into one tire. They tried to drive using...

Myth statement	Status	Notes
...straw stuffing in the tire.	Plausible	They removed the wheel, stuffed the tire with straw, and re-mounted it. The car performed adequately through one lap, but it showed signs of losing its stuffing after the run. Adam and Jamie decided that straw could work as a short-term fix.
...a makeshift sled under the tire.	Busted	They forced a branch underneath the flat tire, running front to back, and lashed it to the wheel. Although Jamie was able to drive the car forward with a push from Adam, the branch came off at a speed bump.
...a replacement wheel carved from a log.	Confirmed	They cut a log section to size, made it as round as possible, and mounted it in place of the wheel. It performed well through one full lap, and Adam and Jamie decided that it was the best solution so far.

Next, Adam and Jamie investigated ways to remedy a flat tire in an urban setting, setting up a road obstacle course. They tested...

Myth statement	Status	Notes
...driving on the rim. (Jamie)	Plausible	After revving the engine until the wooden wheel broke, Jamie mounted a bare rim in its place. Despite the trouble with balance and poor acceleration, he was able to navigate through every obstacle in the course.
...a manhole cover. (Adam)	Plausible	Adam found a cover that was the same size as the tire, mounted it, and was able to drive the course successfully.
...driving with all four wheels modified. (Both)	Rims perform better	Adam and Jamie raced side by side on identical courses. Jamie's bare rims gave him better traction than Adam's manhole covers and allowed him to win the race at a steady speed.

=== Flaming Reel ===
Myth statement	Status	Notes
A fish on the end of a line can swim so fast that the line's reel will catch fire due to friction (inspired by a viral video).	Busted	After spending a day trying to catch fish without success, the Build Team returned to the shop to test line/reel combinations. They began with a lever-drag reel and measured the maximum temperature achieved with the line running out at 20 miles per hour. Four lines were tested, with braided Spectra giving the highest result of 158 °F; it was used for all further testing. Next, the team switched to older-design star-drag reels, one of which reached 245 °F and showed large amounts of smoke. For full-scale testing, the team outfitted a go-kart to match the mass and top swimming speed of a typical sailfish and hooked their line to it from a star-drag reel. Kari drove it at 68 mph, while Tory applied drag and Grant measured the temperature. The first two runs gave a peak of 530 °F and smoked without any fire, even after Tory used larger amounts of flammable lubricant on the second run. Declaring the myth busted, the team brought in a professional motorcycle racer and his sidecar rig to achieve higher speeds. Tory changed the lubricant out for even more flammable engine starting fluid. Runs at 140 and 180 mph gave temperatures over 700 °F, with the second of these causing the line to melt without burning. Finally, Tory set the reel on fire by exposing it to an open flame.

== Episode SP15 – "Planes, Trains, and Automobiles" ==
- Original air date: June 15, 2011

A countdown of the cast's 12 favorite myths involving forms of transportation.

#	Name (in countdown)	Myth featured	Comments
12	Plane Crazy	Talked Into Landing	"Breaking" a NASA flight simulator
11	Out of Control	Instant Convertible	Trouble with setting up crashes (towing, remote control, etc.)
10	Fuel for Thought	Don't Drive Angry	Grant and Tory reliving the stress that Kari put them through to test this myth
9	2 Wheels...Are Better Than 4	Motor Bike Flip, Tablecloth Chaos	Adam and Jamie commenting on two motorcycle-related myths
8	RC Freaks	Car Skip	Trouble with remote control systems on cars
7	Stunt Driving	Drafting for Money, Knight Rider Ramp, Cyclists Drafting a Big Rig	Specialized driving by the cast. Includes a previously unaired segment from 2007 in which Tory drafts behind a truck while riding a bicycle.
6	Controversy Corner	Airplane on a Conveyor Belt	The myth that has generated the most debate among viewers
5	Putting It on the Line	Both versions of "Peeing on the Third Rail", from 2003 and 2004	Adam urinating on camera to help build the original dummy for this myth, then later on an electric fence
4	Pimp My Ride	Reverse Engineering	Extreme modifications to cars for testing myths
3	Need for Speed	Sonic Boom Sound-Off	Adam vomiting as he breaks the sound barrier during a flight with the Blue Angels
2	Taxi!	Supersize Jet Taxi	Testing complicated first by insurance company objections, then by pavement peeling off the runway
1	Carmageddon	Adam: Donated Car Explosion; Jamie: Ramp Jump; Kari: Fixing a Car with Duct Tape; Grant: Snowplow Split; Tory: Elevator Car Cut	Each cast member's favorite myth involving automotive destruction

== Episode 169 – "Let There Be Light" ==
- Original air date: June 22, 2011

=== Let There Be Light ===
Myth statement	Status	Notes
A system of mirrors can be used to reflect sunlight into an underground area and illuminate it sufficiently to allow safe passage (based on a scene in the film The Mummy).	Plausible (but ridiculous)	Adam and Jamie built an obstacle course in the shop and used it to determine the minimum light level needed to see by. To match the movie scene, Adam went from a brightly lit area into total darkness, then to the course; his goal was to reach the other end without knocking over any glasses. He succeeded at a level of 0.39 lux, while the pair estimated that the movie scene had used roughly 200 lux. Adam and Jamie set up six mirrors to bounce light back and forth down the length of the shop, using a spotlight as the source. Polished metal mirrors gave 1.13 lux, but they caused the beam to spread out after only a few reflections. When modern glass mirrors were used instead, the light level registered at 0.49 lux and the beam stayed focused longer. Adam and Jamie realized that the light needed to scatter in order to illuminate the room. At Treasure Island in San Francisco Bay, Adam and Jamie set up a hangar area as a full-scale tomb and brought in six glass mirrors and a 7,000-watt spotlight. After adjusting the mirrors, they measured a light level of 2.3 lux and could easily see their way around. Once the sky cleared, they reflected sunlight into the tomb and found a peak of 2.5 lux until the sun's position shifted, throwing off the mirrors’ alignment. Finally, Jamie stood in the light beam, which scattered in the air when it hit his white shirt and gave 8.6 lux. The need to keep adjusting the mirrors, and the unlikely prospect of finding several of them ready to use after thousands of years underground, led them to declare the myth "plausible but ridiculous."

=== Bumper Cars ===
Myth statement	Status	Notes
It is possible to safely stop an out-of-control car by pulling in front and slowing down.	Confirmed	After taking lessons in stunt driving, the Build Team tested a scenario in which the runaway car would be coasting without the driver's foot on the accelerator. As Kari drove without using either the steering wheel or the brake/gas pedals, Grant pulled in front and slowed down until he made contact with her bumper. He was able to stop her at 35 and 55 mph (56 and 89 km/h). They then tested the possibility of a stuck accelerator and no steering. Kari drove at 75 mph (121 km/h) with her foot on the gas pedal; Tory stopped her with some difficulty, just short of hitting a fence. They declared the myth confirmed at this point. Next, Grant and Tory tried to sandwich Kari's car from either side and managed to stop her, though they began to spin out somewhat. The two men then built car-stoppers: side paddles to attach to two rescue cars’ front bumpers and maneuver to block in the runaway (Grant), and a hood-mounted spear to hook the rescue and runaway cars together so the rescuer can slow them both down from behind (Tory). Both rigs worked without endangering either Kari or her rescuer(s).

== Episode 170 – "Paper Armor" ==
- Original air date: June 29, 2011

=== Depth Charge Disaster ===
Myth statement	Status	Notes
A person can increase his or her chances of surviving an underwater explosion by floating on his or her back at the surface.	Confirmed	Adam and Jamie built a 15 ft (5 m) deep cylindrical tank, fitted it with pressure sensors at four depths, and filled it with water. Firing an underwater .357 Magnum revolver loaded with blanks to generate shock waves, they found that the sensor nearest the surface gave the lowest readings. For full-scale tests, Adam and Jamie used a mast fitted with sensors at depths of 6 in (15 cm) and 2.5, 15, and 25 ft (0.8, 4.6, and 7.6 m), with a fifth at the surface. The first two depths were intended to represent the depth at which a swimmer's torso would be submerged if he or she were floating or treading water. A 10 lb (5 kg) charge of TNT was set off at a depth of 15 ft (5 m) and a set distance from the sensors (30, 70, or 150 ft (9, 21, or 46 m)). Using a pressure threshold of 87 psi (corresponding to a 50% mortality rate from the shock wave), Adam and Jamie found that a floating person would survive at 30 ft (9 m), while greater depths led to pressures likely to cause death. At longer distances, the readings fell below 87 psi. Based on the 30-foot results, they declared the myth confirmed. Jamie attributed these results to the fact that much of the energy from the underwater pressure wave dissipated into transverse waves when it reached the surface.

=== Paper Armor ===
Myth statement	Status	Notes
Ancient Chinese armies used armor made from paper that could give the same protection as steel armor.	Plausible	Kari spoke with antique armor expert Greg Martin, who explained that paper armor was in use as early as 600 BC and was built up from layers that may have been impregnated with resin or shellac. The Build Team tested several formulations for penetration resistance and found that a thick layer of folded paper, with no resin, gave the best results. Using an armor sample (1/2 in (13 mm) paper vs. 1/32 in (1 mm) steel) placed over a block of clay, the team tested resistance to blunt force, swords, and arrows. The paper did as well as steel in the sword and arrow tests, failing only the blunt-force test, so the team built a full suit of paper armor to match against a period-accurate steel counterpart. Each team member ran one of three timed courses in both armor types to evaluate speed, endurance, and agility; paper outperformed steel in all three. Finally, the team attacked the suits with arrows, swords, and two firearms—an 18th-century flintlock pistol and a 19th-century .45 revolver. The armor types resisted every attack except the .45, leading the team to classify the myth as plausible. They pointed out, though, that the paper armor could quickly begin to disintegrate if it got wet or took repeated blows (which happened during the full-scale tests).

== Episode 171 – "Bikes and Bazookas" ==
- Original air date: September 28, 2011

Starting this episode, the theme music is "rearranged and performed" by The Dandy Warhols.

=== Bike vs. Car ===
Myth statement	Status	Notes
Riding a motorcycle contributes less to air pollution than driving a car for the same time period.	Busted	Adam and Jamie chose one car and one motorcycle apiece from the 1980s, 1990s, and 2000s. Adam drove each car and Jamie drove each motorcycle for 30 minutes in the city and on the freeway, using sensors to measure the tailpipe emissions. In every case, the motorcycles gave higher fuel efficiency and lower carbon dioxide emissions than the corresponding cars. However, the cars performed better in terms of emissions of hydrocarbons, nitrogen oxides, and carbon monoxide. At this point, Adam and Jamie decided to try to improve a motorcycle's aerodynamic performance so that it would use less fuel and give lower emissions. They built a teardrop-shaped shell to cover the entire vehicle, with a tubular steel frame and heat-shrink plastic sheeting. Jamie then drove simulated city and highway courses at Naval Air Station Alameda on a modern motorcycle, with the shell on and off. The shell gave the best fuel efficiency and lowest CO_{2} emissions, but it did not perform better than the cars on the other three pollutants. They classified the myth as busted, and Jamie attributed this result to the fact that car pollution technology has advanced faster than that for motorcycles.

=== Red Bazooka ===
Myth statement	Status	Notes
If a handgun bullet is fired at an airborne rocket-propelled grenade, the RPG will explode in midair and kill its shooter, leaving the handgun shooter unharmed (based on a scene in the film Red).	Busted	The Build Team visited the New Mexico Institute of Mining and Technology to learn about the details of RPG use and have a place to do their testing safely and legally. Detonation of a live round showed a jet of molten metal burning through the target, which raised serious questions about a person in front being able to survive. With help from Institute personnel, the team built a rig to launch an RPG directly toward a remote-controlled gun of the same caliber as that used in the film (a Smith & Wesson Model 460 revolver). After a failed first test, they were able to hit the RPG with a bullet and see the former explode in midair. Separate shots of the two weapons on an 80-foot test range, the same distance as the film scene, led them to calculate that the bullet and RPG would collide 16 feet in front of the RPG shooter. However, the particular rounds used for these tests had fuze systems that would not arm until they had flown roughly 60 feet. The team set up two dummies 80 feet apart, outfitted with pork-belly abdomens and foil burst gauges to evaluate injuries. Assuming that the film RPG might have had a defective fuze, the team set up a target 16 feet in front of the RPG dummy, backed the launcher up to ensure a detonation, and fired. Both dummies survived without injury, though molten metal flew through the air just to each side of the handgun dummy and his survival was chalked up to sheer dumb luck. The need for a bad fuze, the forward direction of the explosion, and the fact that the intended target survived only through luck led the team to call the myth busted.

== Episode 172 – "Newton's Crane Cradle" ==
- Original air date: October 5, 2011

=== Wrecking Ball Baloney ===
Myth statement	Status	Notes
It is possible to construct a working Newton's cradle using wrecking balls (inspired by a viral video).	Busted	Adam and Jamie decided to start with small-scale testing and work their way up to find any flaws. To determine the efficiency of energy transfer from ball to ball, Adam pulled the ball at one end out to a certain distance and measured the length of the swing at the other end. His and Jamie's first three models—an off-the-shelf desktop toy, and two built with 2.5 and 6 in (64 and 152 mm) solid steel bearings—gave 98%, 97%, and 94% efficiency, respectively. Jamie noted that the energy loss increased at the larger scales, but it did not depend directly on size or mass. To simulate miniature wrecking balls, Adam and Jamie filled five 6 in (152 mm) hollow steel balls with plaster that had properties similar to concrete. This version gave only 63% efficiency, but Jamie suggested putting a steel plate through the center of each ball to reduce energy transfer into the concrete. They then built five 2,000 lb (907 kg) balls by cutting hollow naval buoys in half, sandwiching a steel plate in each, and filling the space with rebar and concrete. When the rig was assembled at Mare Island Naval Shipyard and hung from an I-beam frame, it gave very poor efficiency and quickly stopped swinging, even after each ball was hung from two cables rather than one as shown in the video. Adam and Jamie declared the myth busted, noting the increased potential for energy losses at large scales, and later learned that the original video had indeed been faked, confirming their initial thoughts.

=== Bird Balance ===
Myth statement	Status	Notes
A car balanced on the edge of a cliff can topple over if a bird perches on the front end.	Busted	The Build Team set up a shipping container as a cliff, with a dirt escape ramp built up against its edge so that the test car would roll down safely if it went over the edge. Grant and Tory, in the car, eased it forward to find the balance point; after several tries and the use of a forklift and straps on the rear bumper, they were able to get the car balanced. With these two still in the car, birds were brought in and allowed to perch on the hood. Two pigeons (1 lb (454 g) each), two hawks (2.5 lb (1.1 kg) each), and an eagle owl (7 lb (3 kg)) were tried separately; none were able to do more than wobble the car slightly. Grant commented that although a weight near the front bumper gave a large amount of leverage, the car itself had enough weight to counteract the effect. The team located a model helicopter and modified it to weigh 20 lb (9.1 kg), the same as a California condor (the largest flying bird in North America). When this too failed to tip the car, the team classified the myth as busted and set out to find out how much weight it would take. The car tipped only after Kari put 80 raw, 1.5 lb (0.7 kg) game hens onto the hood and Tory added a raw, 20 lb (9 kg) remote-controlled turkey for a total of 140 lb (64 kg). Tory additionally commented that for the feat to be accomplished, they would need a pterodactyl to land on the car's hood. This myth was revisited in "Bird Balance Limo" in 2012.

== Episode 173 – "Walk a Straight Line" ==
- Original air date: October 12, 2011

=== Walking Straight ===
Myth statement	Status	Notes
It is impossible for a blindfolded person to travel in a straight line.	Confirmed	Adam and Jamie decided to test the myth by walking, swimming, and driving. They used blackout goggles, noise-blocking headphones or earplugs, and portable GPS devices to track their movements. The walking test, set in an open field, required each man to try to walk toward a target 3,000 ft (914 m) away; both ended up far off course and/or at the edge of the field. They then tried to swim directly across a lake and drive a golf cart straight down an abandoned airfield runway, also without success, and declared the myth confirmed. For a real-world situation, Adam and Jamie then decided to investigate the ability of a person to navigate a straight course if lost in the woods. With no landmarks or destination in view, they tried to follow separate headings for 30 minutes and succeeded by using the sun's position to stay on track. However, with buckets on their heads to simulate reduced visibility at night or in a snowstorm, Adam did poorly while Jamie stayed on track by carefully pacing around obstacles, drawing on his wilderness survival experience. Finally, they attached themselves to opposite ends of a long ladder with hip belts, thinking that each could feel the other's veering and correct it, but failed the open-field walking test again.

=== Binary Fender Bender ===
Myth statement	Status	Notes
A load of mixed binary explosive (Tannerite) in a car trunk can detonate if the car is rear-ended.	Busted	At the bomb range, the Build Team set up jars of the two unmixed components, as well as an 8 oz (227 g) jar of the mixed Tannerite. Tory fired at them with a high-powered sniper rifle; only the mixed jar exploded when hit. Doubling the sample size gave a larger blast, and shooting one jar in a stack of five created a chain reaction that set them all off. To simulate a freeway rear-end collision, the team half-buried a target car with its nose down and the protruding trunk packed with 50 lb (23 kg) of mixed Tannerite. They dropped a second car on it from 150 ft (46 m), nose down, but the load did not explode on impact. Declaring the myth busted at this point, the team traveled to the New Mexico Institute of Mining and Technology to use the on-site rocket sled apparatus. After setting off a 100 lb (45 kg) load of explosive to determine the appearance of the actual blast, they set a target car on the track, with the same size load, and fitted a pickup truck's front end onto the sled. Enough rocket motors were attached to accelerate the sled to a top speed of 300 mph (483 km/h), but the impact only disintegrated the target car without triggering a detonation. A cloud of undetonated Tannerite was visibly sprayed in all directions by the force of the impact. The tests suggest that Tannerite is difficult to detonate unintentionally, the myth being that it was detonated unintentionally. Other binary explosives, however, may not necessarily be as safe.

== Episode 174 – "Duct Tape Plane" ==
- Original air date: October 19, 2011

=== Excavator Exuberance ===
Adam and Jamie investigated three viral videos involving excavators. They tested the machine's ability to...

Myth statement	Status	Notes
...row a barge on open water, using the excavator's bucket as an oar.	Confirmed	They set up two excavators (rather than one as shown in the video) on a barge and had a tugboat tow them 0.5 mi (805 m) into San Francisco Bay. Their goal was to keep control of the barge's direction and maintain forward momentum toward the shore. The first attempt failed due to strong currents pushing them into the bay; when they started closer to shore, they were able to row to the dock.
...spin in place and allow a person tethered to the bucket to wakeboard.	Confirmed (Pure Unadulterated Fun)	Jamie operated an excavator set in the middle of a pond while Adam rode the board. After a few adjustments of bucket height and spin speed, Adam successfully stayed upright. He enjoyed himself so much that he created a special category for this myth: "Pure Unadulterated Fun."
...load itself into the back of a cargo truck.	Confirmed	Adam met with an expert machinery operator to work out the details of attempting this feat. By carefully manipulating the boom, bucket, and tracks, he was able to lean the front end against the tailgate, then turn the cabin around and lift the rear end off the ground so he could drive into the cargo bed.

=== Duct Tape Plane ===
Myth statement	Status	Notes
If a bear rips a hole in a grounded airplane's fuselage, the pilot can patch the hole with duct tape so that the plane can fly away safely (based on news accounts of an Alaskan pilot who repaired his plane in this manner).	Confirmed	The Build Team obtained a plane with a fuselage similar to the one on the plane in the actual incident. After they assembled it and watched its owner take a test flight to confirm its airworthiness, Kari used a pair of clawed gloves to shred the relevant portions of the fuselage. As she and Tory started covering the damage with duct tape, Grant worked on the control surfaces needed to keep the plane stable in flight. The plane's owner then taxied on a runway and took off, spending over 30 minutes in the air with no observable deterioration of the tape despite the wind and temperature.
It is possible to construct a workable airplane fuselage skin using only duct tape.	Confirmed	Using the same donated plane, the team ripped off every piece of the fuselage and covered the frame with tape. The removed material weighed the same as 5 rolls, but the team ended up using 17 rolls to build a layered skin intended to resist vibrations and rippling. When the plane was set up in front of a wind machine set to 50 mph (80 km/h), Grant and Tory saw no damage in the tape. A test pilot then taxied on the runway and took the plane for a short flight at an altitude of 5 ft (1.5 m), reporting no problems in wind gusts over the plane's original rating of 12 mph (19 km/h). Grant commented afterward that calmer winds might have allowed the pilot to take a longer flight at a higher altitude.

== Episode 175 – "Flying Guillotine" ==
- Original air date: October 26, 2011

=== C4 Cook-Off ===
Myth statement	Status	Notes
C-4 plastic explosive is stable enough to burn without exploding and can be used to cook food, but a mechanical shock to the burning material will set it off.	Confirmed (1st half) / Busted (2nd half)	At the bomb range, Adam and Jamie set up a piece of C-4 and ignited it remotely. The material burned for 2 minutes without exploding and registered temperatures of 1,000 °F (538 °C). Setting up a stove from two bricks and an oven rack, they were able to warm a military MRE ration somewhat. For comparison purposes, they ignited 1 oz (28 g) samples of C-4 and three other fuels (hexamethylenetetramine, 1,3,5-trioxane, and chafing-dish fuel) under pots of water and measured the peak temperature and time to burn out. HMTA achieved a higher temperature than the other three, but the C-4 and the two remaining fuels reached broadly the same temperature, and the speed with which the C-4 burned led Adam to decide that it could be used as a workable cooking fuel. For sensitivity tests, Adam and Jamie rigged a full, 7 lb (3.2 kg) cooking pot to fall on a piece of burning C-4 from 3 ft (91 cm), then set up a robotic leg in a combat boot to stomp on it. Neither of these trials produced an explosion, so they dropped a 90 lb (41 kg) anvil on the material, without success. Shooting at the C-4 with different .308 rifle cartridges—standard, tracer, and incendiary—failed to trigger an explosion as well. Finally, Adam and Jamie set up a thermite charge to drip molten material at 4,500 °F (2,482 °C) onto the C-4, thinking that extreme heat might make it sensitive enough to detonate. This test failed as well, and Jamie noted that C-4 was formulated to be stable unless set off by a blasting cap. He and Adam judged the first half of the myth confirmed but the second half busted. Jamie added that stomping on burning C-4 is still a bad idea, but more because it burns at a very high temperature and tends to stick to the bottom of shoes, rather than any risk of it exploding.

=== The Flying Guillotine ===
Myth statement	Status	Notes
The 18th-century Chinese designed a throwing weapon that could decapitate an opponent and carry the head back to the thrower (inspired by appearances of such weapons in martial-arts movies).	Plausible	The Build Team set three criteria for success: ease of throwing, enough power to cleanly remove a head, and ability to contain it while being retrieved. After each member designed a different prototype, the three devices were tested against a pig neck with Buster's head mounted on it. All three could be thrown to land on the head from 10 ft (3.0 m). Kari's guillotine-inspired design did succeed in removing the head from the body, but more through brute pulling force, as it sliced only a little way into the actual spine. Grant's complex, spring-loaded design, despite the team's fears about its safety and the lengthy arming time, actually ended up being the least successful of the three, slicing only a little way into the neck and causing no damage whatsoever to the pig's spine. Tory's—a spinning ring on a cable, with a salad bowl to hold the head—came the closest to a full decapitation, slicing about halfway through the spine, and the team decided to build on his design. After a few refinements to his design, Tory was able to take the head off and have it retained within the device. Kari and Grant set up a combat situation, involving one moving enemy dummy and a second that could pop up from behind a screen. Tory hit the pop-up enemy with a glancing blow and knocked it down, but he could not land his device on the moving one. Based on these results, the team decided that the flying guillotine was plausible as an assassination weapon but not in combat.

== Episode 176 – "Drain Disaster" ==
- Original air date: November 2, 2011

=== Drain Disaster ===
Myth statement	Status	Notes
A methane explosion in a sewer can launch a manhole cover into the air without destroying it.	Confirmed	For small-scale testing, Adam and Jamie built a miniature sewer pipe fitted with a full-length viewing window and three manholes. They pumped in enough methane to reach a 9% concentration in air, the center of its flammability range, and used a spark to set off the mixture. A test with both ends of the pipe open gave only a small flash of flame; when the ends were closed, all three covers flew off. The addition of metal debris to the pipe, simulating junk that might collect in a real sewer, launched the covers even higher due to a faster, larger flame front moving around all the obstructions. Adam and Jamie next built a 40 ft (12 m) sewer in a trench using concrete culvert sections, installed three manholes, and placed rolls of chain-link fencing in it to simulate debris. After burying it under 3 ft (91 cm) of dirt, they pumped in the methane and set it off. The resulting explosion threw the covers 150 ft (46 m) skyward and slightly shifted the dirt over the sewer. High-speed footage showed fire coming from only one manhole, indicating that a deflagration had taken place rather than a detonation. Judging the myth confirmed at this point, Adam and Jamie noted that a detonation might have sent the covers even higher.

=== Bedlam-Proof Bedliner ===
The Build Team tested viewers’ claims concerning the toughness of spray-on truck bedliner resin. They investigated its ability to withstand...

Myth statement	Status	Notes
...a car crash.	Busted	The team sprayed one half of a car with bedliner, leaving the other exposed, and carried out crash tests. In 6 mph (10 km/h) front- and rear-end collisions with a concrete barricade, the treated side showed much less damage than the untreated one. However, when Tory rammed each side with a second car at 25 mph (40 km/h), the team found the same serious damage on both sides.
...a dog bite.	Confirmed	Grant built a robot modeled after a German Shepherd's skull, calibrated to match its bite force. The team sprayed one sleeve on each of four jackets—denim, leather, canvas, and quilted coat—and tested the robot on all eight sleeves. It easily bit through the untreated sleeves and damaged the dummy arms underneath, but it could not penetrate the treated ones. Tory chose the quilted coat for testing against a police dog; after it had been completely sprayed, he put it on and suffered no injuries when the dog tried to bite him.
…an explosion.	Confirmed	The team built wood-frame and cinderblock walls, one treated and one untreated of each type, and placed Buster behind each before setting off a C-4 charge 5 ft (1.5 m) in front. The untreated walls were badly damaged and threw large amounts of debris on Buster, while the treated ones showed no damage and protected him.

== Episode SP16 – "Location, Location, Location" ==
- Original air date: November 9, 2011

A countdown of the cast's 12 favourite locations for testing myths, with an emphasis on one myth that was tested at the location.

No.	Name (in countdown)	Myth featured	Comments
12	Home Sweet Home	No specific myth	M5 Industries, the MythBusters' home base, is examined. It includes details on the origins of the M5 name, the opening and closing of M6, the shop initially used by the Build Team in 2004 (roughly corresponding to the period between the formation of the Build Team and Scottie Chapman's departure), as well as M7, the Build Team's home since 2005 (roughly corresponding to Grant joining the Build Team).
11	Don't "Quarry" About It!	Cement Mix-Up; Knock Your Socks Off	The quarries used by the MythBusters are examined. Adam and Jamie detail the last-minute addition of the concrete truck explosion. The Build Team also details the damage control after the pressure wave from a quarry explosion caused collateral damage in nearby Esparto, California, and why they have not been at that quarry since.
10	African Adventure	Elephants Scared of Mice	The myths tested in South Africa are featured. Though initially they were filming for "Supersize Shark," due to inclement conditions, they decided to film an impromptu myth to better make use of their time there.
9	Runaway Runway	Tree Cannon	The runway at Alameda is featured. The location is frequented so much (at the time of filming, most recently, the previous day for the finale of Fixing a Flat) that Grant recalls that some fans mistakenly believed that M5 was based in Alameda. Jamie notes that the hand-carved cannonball that was shot out of the tree cannon was never found, even after 7 years.
8	Zombie Town	Elevator of Death	Abandoned areas are featured in this entry, with a special focus on the abandoned residential neighborhood nicknamed by the crew as "Zombie Town." The effort into cleaning up the site before "Elevator of Death" could be tested is detailed.
7	Cool for School	No specific myth	University and government research facilities used by the MythBusters are detailed, with a specific emphasis on the rocket sled testing facilities in New Mexico Tech. Jamie also talks about the people who run these facilities and the insight they provide to the myths being tested.
6	Thunderdome	No specific myth	The local power-generating stations used in myths that require high-voltage electricity, nicknamed the "Thunderdome" by Adam, is featured.
5	Just Hanging Out!	7 Paper Fold	The hangars at Moffat Field are featured. The Build Team recalls an owl dung that had to be removed from the paper between testing days as the paper was being laid out.
4	Presidential Perks	President's Challenge	The MythBusters' three visits to the White House are featured, and featured is Jamie's speechlessness at Barack Obama's introduction speech congratulating the role of MythBusters in children's science education. The 500 students chosen in that test were all from the high school where Jamie's wife has been a longtime science teacher.
3	It's Snow Joke	Spinning Ice Bullets	Myths tested in wintry conditions are tested. The Build Team talks about having to brave the weather in the Sierra Nevada mountains.
2	Deserted Desert	JATO Rocket; Confederate Rocket	The Mojave Desert is featured. Kari, then an intern at M5, details on her role in the pilot episode, having driven through the night to catch up to Adam and Jamie. Adam and Jamie detail on having an M5 truck stuck in the mud on two occasions during "Confederate Rocket." Jamie also notes that portions of the desert are cleared for types of testing that the MythBusters have yet to fully make use of.
1	Home Away From Home	Sawdust Cannon	Nicknamed "home away from home," the bomb range is explored. Jamie talks about how some of the myths involving explosives would otherwise be illegal if the bomb range was not available. The Build Team details their experience with the non-dairy creamer cannon and how much more dangerous than it was originally anticipated. The challenges of working in rainy conditions, when the ground is wet and muddy. The episode ends with a montage of explosions from myths tested on the range.

== Episode SP17 – "Wet and Wild" ==
- Original air date: November 16, 2011

A countdown of the cast's 12 favorite myths involving water.

No.	Name (in countdown)	Myth(s) featured	Comments
12	Wettest & Wildest	Waterslide Wipeout	Building the massive, steep launch ramp for this myth, and Adam's experience sliding down it
11	Water Bomb	Water Safe; Black Powder Shark	Two of the cast's favorite myths involving submerged explosives
10	Out in the Cold	Swimming in Syrup	Challenges of staying warm during the swimming time trials, filmed during winter in San Francisco
9	Dive! Dive! Dive!	The Squeeze	The Build Team's unsavory experience with the pork dummy Tory built to help test this myth
8	MythBusters on Ice	Blue Ice	The Build Team reflects on their visit to a NASA low-temperature wind tunnel.
7	Under Pressure	Exploding Water Heater; Steam Powered Machine Gun	Dealing with the energy and hazards of steam in myth testing
6	Pool Cruelty	Bulletproof Water	Mayhem caused by firing high-powered weapons into a swimming pool
5	Water Torture	Chinese Water Torture	Unpleasant experiences of Adam and Kari during this round of testing (Adam urinating on himself, Kari enduring the torture until a paramedic stopped the test and removed her)
4	The Life Aquatic	Octopus Egg Pregnancy	Adam's discovery that the texture of his skin was unusually pleasant to octopuses
3	Boatmageddon	Bifurcated Boat	The Build Team's repeated difficulties in setting up and performing their tests on land
2	Hidden Depths	Adam: Eye Gouge; Jamie: Fish Flap; Build Team: Fatal Flashlight	Memorable shark myths, as chosen by each cast member (the Build Team's choice was unanimous)
1	Rock the Boat	Building a Pykrete Boat	The inspiration for building a speedboat out of newspaper-based "Super Pykrete," stemming from the cast's second trip to Alaska

== Episode 177 – "Wheel of Mythfortune" ==
- Original air date: November 23, 2011

Adam, Jamie, and the Build Team test four myths chosen at random from viewer submissions.

=== Pick a Door ===
Adam and Jamie tested the myths that when people were presented with the Monty Hall problem, they would...

Myth statement	Status	Notes
...tend to stick with their first choice.	Confirmed	After they built a game-show mockup set at a local theater, Adam acted as a game-show host and had 20 volunteers play a game of "Pick a Door." Once a player chose a door, Jamie opened an empty one and Adam offered the player a chance to switch; all 20 stayed with their original pick, many of them believing that they had a 50–50 chance to win at this point.
...be more likely to win if they changed their decision.	Confirmed	They built a small-scale simulator to do 50 trials each, with Adam always switching his choice and Jamie never switching. Adam won far more often than Jamie did, and Jamie explained the reason: Because the player has a 2/3 probability of choosing a losing door at first, switching turns the odds in his or her favor.

=== Grenade Shrapnel ===
Myth statement	Status	Notes
If a live grenade lands near a person, he or she can avoid shrapnel injuries by lying flat on the ground.	Busted	The Build Team set up a grenade and placed rupture discs at 1 ft (0.3 m) intervals around it, from 1 ft (0.3 m) to 10 ft (3.0 m), in order to find the lethal radius of the blast wave. All discs at 5 ft (1.5 m) and closer burst, so the team set up plywood panels and a plastic roof just beyond this distance to gauge the shrapnel spread. Tests with both a mid-20th century "pineapple" grenade and a modern "baseball" device showed injuries at all heights from ground to roof level. Although the team judged the myth busted, they found relatively few hits in the area corresponding to a person lying on the ground, indicating that lying down might reduce the chance of shrapnel injuries.

=== Firearm Fashion ===
Adam and Jamie examined the effectiveness of handgun firing stances often used in movies to find out if they allow a handgun user to shoot faster and more accurately than the standard two-handed stance. They set up targets at 15 ft (4.6 m), and each took a turn firing 8 rounds from a .45 caliber pistol (16 rounds for the two-gun trials), evaluating their performance on a combination of speed and accuracy. The techniques they tested were...

Myth statement	Status	Notes
...the Weaver technique (two-handed).	Confirmed	This was the control technique because it is known to be effective and is actually used by law enforcement personnel. The final score for the control was 7.3.
...from the hip.	Busted	The final score for this technique was 2.8, far lower than the control. The main reason was that neither Adam nor Jamie had any way of knowing where he was aiming because he could not look down the sights on the pistol. Both of them also had no ability to aim in the same place every time.
...from the shoulder, with a straight arm.	Plausible	The final score for this technique was 7.1, which was very close to the control. It was effective because, like the Weaver technique, Adam and Jamie were able to use the sights on the gun to aim well.
...from the shoulder with the gun turned sideways, gangster-style.	Busted	The final score for this technique was 1.3, the lowest score of all the techniques tested. Like with shooting from the hip, Adam and Jamie were not able to aim using the sights.
...using two guns pointed straight ahead, fired alternately.	Busted	For both of the two-gun techniques, Adam and Jamie used twice as many bullets, which still gave an accurate comparison because the doubled amount of time counteracted the doubled scoring opportunities. The final score for this technique was 4.1, lower than the control. Adam and Jamie found it difficult to repeatedly switch looking down each gun between shots.
...using two guns with the arms crossed.	Busted	The final score for this technique was 4.6, which was also lower than the control. Like with the previous technique, it was found difficult to manage two guns at the same time. Notably, however, the score for this technique was slightly higher than the previous technique.

There was one more technique tested in the 2012 season that proved more effective than the control.

=== Flaming Tire ===
Myth statement	Status	Notes
It is possible to re-inflate a flat tire and re-seat it on its rim by spraying in engine starting fluid and igniting it.	Busted	Kari sprayed the fluid into a deflated car tire and ignited it, but the tire did not inflate or re-seat. In a second trial, Tory stepped on the tire to mix the air and fluid; when ignited, the tire quickly re-seated and inflated to the point of bursting. Upon cooling, though, the gases inside the tire contracted and formed a vacuum inside the tire, making it useless. The Build Team obtained the same result with a truck tire, prompting them to declare the myth busted. Tory noted that although the starting fluid can be used to re-seat the tire, a source of compressed air is needed to inflate it.

=== Overloaded Car ===
This myth was cut from the broadcast episode, but it is shown on the version uploaded to the Banijay Science YouTube Channel.

Myth statement	Status	Notes
It is possible for a small top-heavy sedan with concrete on its back seat and wooden materials laden on its roof weighing a total of about 3,000 pounds (1,400 kg) to still be drivable (based on a viewer-sent photo and associated story).	Confirmed	Adam and Jamie acquired a car that was the same make and model as the one in the photo, then loaded the back seat with 800 pounds (360 kg) of raw concrete and laid 2,300 pounds (1,000 kg) total of plywood and 2×2 and 4×4 lumber on the roof held with latching in the same fashion as in the photo. Despite over triple the recommended load on the car causing the tires to get too close to the wheel wells and the car to have low clearance to the road, Adam and Jamie were still able to make a complete lap through the parking lot. Although calling the myth confirmed, the MythBusters commented that loading the car this way would not be recommended due to the potential of ruining the car as well as posing a danger to other motorists.

== Episode 178 – "Toilet Bomb" ==
- Original air date: November 30, 2011

=== Toilet Bomb ===
Myth statement	Status	Notes
If a pressure-triggered bomb is cooled with liquid nitrogen, its detonation will be delayed long enough for a person to dive into a bathtub and cover himself or herself with a bomb blanket, surviving the explosion (based on a scene in the film Lethal Weapon 2).	Confirmed	Adam and Jamie decided to test three facets of the myth: time to get off the toilet and into the tub, effectiveness of LN2 in delaying the trigger, and ability of the blanket and tub to shield its occupants. After building a replica of the movie bathroom and incorporating all details of the scene, including a prolonged time spent sitting on the toilet, Adam was able to pull Jamie into the tub and under the blanket in 1.95 seconds. On the bomb range, Adam and Jamie set up a charge of C-4 and a high-speed camera to measure the delay between triggering and detonation. A control run with an ambient-temperature bomb gave a delay of 3.3 milliseconds, while pouring the LN2 directly onto the charge increased it to 15 milliseconds. When the LN2 was poured over both the charge and the battery powering the trigger, the bomb would not detonate at all until the entire rig had warmed up to ambient temperature, 15 minutes later. Adam and Jamie commented that the technique was actually more effective in real life than in the film; the characters could have simply stood up and walked out of the bathroom. To test the third part of the myth, Adam and Jamie built a bathroom set with a heavy cast-iron tub as seen in the film, put Buster in the tub under a blanket, and fitted the tub with sensors to measure the pressure inside and outside. When a 1 kg charge of C-4 was set off under the toilet, the entire set was destroyed except for the tub. The peak pressure outside the tub was a lethal 180 psi (1.2 MPa), while the inside sensor recorded 8 psi (55 kPa), meaning that a person would survive but have some chance of suffering hearing damage. Adam and Jamie declared the myth confirmed.

=== Flock Formation ===
Myth statement	Status	Notes
Airplanes can save fuel and money by flying in V-formation, similar to a flock of birds.	Confirmed	While visiting a bird sanctuary, Kari and Tory learned the reason for the birds’ V-formation: Air vortices from the leading birds’ wings allow the trailing ones to flap less often and less vigorously. Kari then built some model airplanes, which she and Grant took for testing in a NASA water chamber. With three planes in a V, they saw vortices at the lead plane's wingtips that persisted for a large distance behind it. At Tracy Municipal Airport, the Build Team met with a 9-member acrobatic flight club to test out flying formations: V, wingtip to wingtip, single file, and a control run with no formation. A tight V reduced fuel consumption by 3–5% compared to the control, while the other two formations either gave no reduction or increased the fuel usage. The team declared the myth confirmed at this point, but they noted that the close formation could pose a danger to the pilots. A second run, with the planes spaced farther apart, gave a fuel savings for only Tory due to the difficulty of staying in the lead planes’ vortices. Nevertheless, the team commented that even a small fuel savings could lead to a sizable financial advantage at a large scale.
