= MythBusters (2012 season) =

- No. of episodes: 21 (includes 3 specials)

Release
- Original network: Discovery Channel
- Original release: March 25 – November 25, 2012

Season chronology
- ← Previous; 2011 season Next → 2013 season

The cast of the television series MythBusters perform experiments to verify or debunk urban legends, old wives' tales, and the like. This is a list of the various myths tested on the show as well as the results of the experiments (the myth is Busted, Plausible, or Confirmed).

On February 28, 2012, Discovery Channel announced that the 2012 season would commence airing on March 25, 2012. The season aired in a Sunday time slot, instead of its previous Wednesday time slot.

== Cannonball accident ==
On December 6, 2011, while taping for the "Cannonball Chemistry" story, a home-made cannon test sent a cannonball through a residential neighborhood in Dublin, California. No one was injured, but the cannonball did considerable property damage, crashing through the walls of a family's house and landing in a car.

== Episode overview ==
No. overall	No. in season	Title	Original release date	Overall episode No.
179	1	"Duct Tape Island"	March 25, 2012	197
Myths tested: Can a pallet of duct tape help you survive on a deserted island?
180	2	"Fire vs. Ice"	April 1, 2012	198
Myths tested: Can a fire extinguisher hold off a flamethrower? Can a fleet of cars kick up enough dust to blind a surveillance drone?
181	3	"Square Wheels"	April 8, 2012	199
Myths tested: Can a vehicle run as well on square wheels as it does on round ones? Can two cars stuck nose-to-nose really do the maneuvers shown in the film Date Night?
182	4	"Swinging Pirates"	April 15, 2012	200
Myths tested: Can the swinging-cage rescue in Pirates of the Caribbean: Dead Man's Chest really be done? Can an oil drum filled with methanol work as a high speed go kart?
183	5	"Battle of the Sexes"	April 22, 2012	201
Myths tested: Are men better at driving than women? Are women better at reading facial emotions than men? Are men better at grilling than women? Are men better at following maps than women? Are men better at packing the car for a trip than women?
184	6	"Driving in Heels"	April 29, 2012	202
Myths tested: Does a driver's choice of footwear affect driving performance? Does a full bladder pose as much of a driving hazard as being legally intoxicated? Can superglue be used to turn a room upside down? Can superglue restrain a driver as well as a seat belt does during a collision?
185	7	"Revenge of the Myth"	May 6, 2012	203
Myths tested: Can fireworks really launch a person over a lake? (Revisit of: Fireworks Man); Can the weight of a bird be enough to tip a teetering car off of a cliff? (Revisit of: Bird Balance); Can a water heater turned on its side be used as a cannon? Can excavators be used to thread a needle or pour a glass of wine?
186	8	"Bouncing Bullet"	May 13, 2012	204
Myths tested: Can a bullet ricochet off pavement and up through a car's floorboard, as seen in Burn Notice? Can you ride an explosion's shock wave to jump farther than you can under your own power?
SP18	Special–1	"Mailbag Special"	May 20, 2012	205
Myths tested: Can you eat a spoonful of cinnamon without drinking water? Which will fall faster, a six-pack of light beer or regular beer? Can a row of 25 watermelons stop a bullet fired from a .50 caliber Desert Eagle pistol? Can a van loaded with leaking containers of flammable gases explode when it receives a signal from its keyless remote? Note: This is a special episode. The Build Team answered a series of randomly chosen letters sent in by viewers, answering questions and doing a series of short tests.
187	9	"Bubble Pack Plunge"	June 3, 2012	206
Myths tested: Can you survive a 35 ft fall while covered in bubble wrap? Can a rocket-powered ejector seat flip an upside-down car back onto its wheels, as seen in Die Another Day?
188	10	"Duel Dilemmas"	June 10, 2012	207
Myths tested: Should you really never bring a knife to a gunfight? Will you lose a sword fight if you try to strike first? Did the 14th century Chinese design a two-stage, arrow-launching missile?
189	11	"Hollywood Gunslingers"	June 17, 2012	208
Myths tested: Can someone running through gunfire make it out safe? Can bullets made of silver or engraved with an enemy's name be as effective as unmodified ammunition? Does the person who draws second have a better chance of winning in a gunfight? Can a nail gun inflict wounds as lethal as a firearm? Can a MAC-10 dropped down a flight of stairs start firing by itself? Can a person firing two pistols simultaneously, rather than alternating left and right hand shots, hit targets more effectively than a person holding one pistol in a two-handed stance? (Revisit of: Firearm Fashion); Is the length of a typical action-movie gunfight realistic?
SP19	Special–2	"Jawsome Shark Special"	August 13, 2012	209
Adam and Jamie count down their 25 favorite shark-related myths. Note: This is a special episode.
190	12	"Titanic Survival"	October 7, 2012	210
Myths tested: Could Jack have survived with Rose in the ending of Titanic? Is it possible to build a rocket-powered surfboard? Note: James Cameron was a special guest on this episode.
191	13	"Trench Torpedo"	October 14, 2012	211
Myths tested: Can a trench with perfect 90° corners absorb an explosion's shockwave inside the trench better than a trench with rounded corners? Can balloons act like an airbag during a car crash and save someone's life?
192	14	"Hail Hijinx" "Cliffhanger Bridge Boom"	October 21, 2012 (US); September 3, 2012 (AUS)	212
Myths tested: Can you jump to safety from a collapsing rope bridge as seen in the film Cliffhanger? Can a strong enough hailstorm sink a boat?
193	15	"Fright Night"	October 28, 2012	213
Myths tested: Can certain sound frequencies persuade people that an area is haunted? Is it really possible to smell fear? Is it really as easy to move and bury a dead body as it is in the movies?
194	16	"Mini Myth Medley"	November 4, 2012	214
Myths tested: Are people really well-acquainted with the backs of their own hands? Can a needle be thrown through a glass pane without shattering it? Is it really impossible to ride a bicycle underwater? Does the "potty dance" really allow you to delay the urge to urinate?
195	17	"Cannonball Chemistry"	November 11, 2012	215
Myths tested: Can a mattress cushion the impact of a long fall onto water? Are stone cannonballs as deadly as steel ones?
196	18	"Food Fables"	November 18, 2012	216
Myths tested: Can you cook a full holiday meal on the engine of a running car? Does the tryptophan in turkey make you sleepy? Is it easy to confuse the taste of unusual meat with chicken? Can a particular Chinese pressure vessel be used to cook popcorn faster than other methods?
SP20	Special–3	"Explosions A to Z" "The A to Z of Explosives"	November 25, 2012 (US); September 24, 2012 (AUS)	217
The Build Team goes through the alphabet highlighting some of the show's 752 detonations and counting. Note: This is a special episode.

== Episode 179 – "Duct Tape Island" ==
- Original air date: March 25, 2012

The Build Team does not appear in this episode.

=== Duct Tape Island Survival ===
Marooned on a tropical island (Oahu, Hawaii) with only a pallet of duct tape, Adam and Jamie had to use it to perform the tasks needed for survival. Their goals were to...

Myth	Status	Notes
...build a distress signal.	Confirmed	They built a giant SOS on the beach, weighted down with rocks at the corners and visible from altitudes up to 4 mi (6.4 km). Jamie noted that the tape's gray color made it a less-than-ideal material for attracting attention.
...make clothing.	Confirmed	While building the signal, the heat and exertion began to take their toll on Adam, so he made a sun hat. Both men later made sandals from branches and tape to protect their feet as they moved around the island.
...find fresh water.	Confirmed	Adam found a pond, but Jamie warned against drinking the water because it was stagnant. After a night of sleeping on emergency mats made by sticking tape strands directly to the ground, they searched separately the next day. Jamie built a solar still on the beach, using the plastic overwrap from the original pallet in addition to tape, but collected only a few ounces of water after several hours. Adam followed areas of lush vegetation and eventually found a freshwater spring; he then made a container to carry several liters of water back to Jamie.
...find food.	Confirmed	Jamie made spears from tree limbs and tape and successfully caught fish with them, while Adam hunted wild chickens in the forest. He tried to use a snare without success, then put together a tape net and camouflaged it, planning to reel it off the ground when a chicken ran over it. The first chicken slipped out of the net, but Adam was able to catch and hold the next one. Adam later noted that he and Jamie did not cook the chicken, but instead ate food provided by the crew in its place.
...build a fire.	Confirmed	Adam built a bamboo bow drill, using tape as the string. After several attempts and broken strings, he successfully got a fire going.
...build a shelter.	Confirmed	Adam strung up tape hammocks in a clearing and added overhead canopies and floor mats. He also put together chairs, a table, and a chess set using pieces of wood.
...stay focused.	Confirmed	Jamie took some time to experiment with building a surfboard from tape pontoons and teaching himself to use it. Although his own inexperience and a series of leaks ultimately caused the project to fail, he noted that it did succeed in keeping his mind sharp and occupied. The chess set in the shelter also helped both men in this respect.
...escape the island.	Confirmed	MythBusters outrigger canoe made of duct tape Adam and Jamie set out to build a seaworthy craft that could hold them and several days' worth of supplies. They designed a canoe with an outrigger for stability, using a bamboo frame and a tape hull, and put together an impromptu worktable to keep dirt out of the tape as they worked. After six hours of construction, they launched the canoe and steered it into the oncoming breakers with little trouble. Seven hours later, Adam sighted land and they put ashore—on the island they had just left.

== Episode 180 – "Fire vs. Ice" ==
- Original air date: April 1, 2012

=== Fire vs. Ice ===
Myth statement	Status	Notes
A carbon dioxide fire extinguisher can be used to repel an attack from a flamethrower. This myth was inspired by a viral video.	Busted	As Jamie built a small-scale flamethrower, Adam tested a standard CO_{2} extinguisher and found that it could discharge to a distance of 25 ft (8 m), close to the 30 ft (9 m) shown in the video. The two faced off, with Adam walking toward Jamie and deploying his extinguisher. He was able to put out the flames, but had to get within only a few feet to do so. For a larger test, Jamie built a military-style flamethrower, while Adam made a new extinguisher that used pressurized water to drive the CO_{2} out and improve the range. At a bomb range, Jamie's rig achieved a distance of 60 to 80 ft (18 to 24 m), and Adam stood behind a glass shield 60 ft (18 m) away (matching the video) to try and hold it off. A standard extinguisher proved ineffective; Adam's high-pressure rig did hold the flames back, but to a distance far below the full 30 ft (9 m). Since they were unable to replicate the video results, they declared the myth busted. Almost none of the flamethrower construction details were shown on camera as possession of such a device is illegal where the show is filmed. Jamie noted that he and Adam were able to test this myth only under the supervision of several government agencies, referring to it as an "ordeal".

=== Dust Devil ===
Myth statement	Status	Notes
By driving in circles on a dusty road, a group of cars can kick up enough dust to blind a surveillance drone flying overhead. Based on a scene in the film Body of Lies.	Busted	The Build Team set up a circular practice course to simulate poor visibility in a dust storm and outfitted the cars with various guidance and safety systems. Their first attempts to drive the course ended in failure, but they discovered that the paper they had used to cover the windshields was too opaque. After replacing it with burlap for the correct visibility, Tory, Kari, and two staff members were able to drive the course safely, with Grant coordinating their movements. On a desert plain, they set up a new circle and placed Kari at its center to act as the film's kidnapping victim. Tory and three staffers drove around her to kick up dust clouds, after which one pulled up for her to get in and all four drove away in different directions. Grant tried to pick the right car, watching from a helicopter and using a similar camera setup as an actual drone. He succeeded in the first test due to the lack of dust clouds at the center of the circle; however, when the cars drove straight past Kari in a second test, he was unable to pick the one that took her. A repeat of this test, using a thermal imaging camera such as those used on drones, allowed him to find her easily. Returning to the shop, the team looked into ways to foil the camera system and discovered that a CO_{2} fire extinguisher could blind it effectively, due to the low temperature of the discharge. One last straight-run test in the desert, with the cars spraying CO_{2} into the sky, kept Grant from being able to locate Kari. The team judged the myth busted, since the technique in the film did not work, but they noted that the underlying idea could be used successfully under different circumstances.

== Episode 181 – "Square Wheels" ==
- Original air date: April 8, 2012

=== Square Wheels ===
Myth	Status	Notes
A vehicle fitted with square wheels can provide a smooth ride if driven fast enough.	Plausible	Adam and Jamie designed a set of square wheels to support the weight of a pickup truck, then cut the treads off a set of tires and fitted them on. They set up a test course, using a heavy-duty pickup equipped with vibration sensors, and drove a control run (using round wheels) at speeds up to 60 mph (97 km/h). When the square wheels were mounted, the ride was very rough at first but began to smooth out as the speed was increased. However, one wheel fell off after only a few seconds when its bolts snapped. For small-scale testing of other wheel orientations, Adam and Jamie returned to the shop and built a cart to run on a treadmill. They found that if two wheels, diagonally opposite each other, were turned 45 degrees out of phase with the other two, the cart achieved a balance of smoothness and stability. A full-scale test at almost 20 mph (32 km/h) caused the tire treads and brake pads to come off the wheels. Despite the mechanical failures, they classified the myth as plausible, based on the sensor readouts and their own sensations.
Square wheels can give an advantage in hill-climbing when compared to round ones.	Busted	Adam and Jamie set up a dirt track consisting of a straight stretch leading to a steep uphill run. They believed that the square wheels might reduce pressure on the soft dirt and/or allow the car to dig in and get better traction. However, the truck climbed the same distance up the hill with either round or square wheels, leading them to judge this myth as busted.

=== Date Night Car ===
Inspired by a scene in the film Date Night, in which a taxicab and sports sedan stuck together by their front bumpers perform a series of maneuvers in city streets. The Build Team obtained two cars similar to those used in the scene, tore off their front bumpers, and built a hitch to hold them together nose-to-nose. Driving at 40 mph (64 km/h), with Tory in the cab and Grant and Kari in the sedan, they tested the cars' ability to...

Myth	Status	Notes
...drive in a straight line.	Confirmed	For the first test, Grant and Kari successfully pushed Tory backwards, but could not steer very well. They obtained a similar result in reverse, with the cab pushing the sedan.
...go around a 90-degree turn.	Busted	Grant and Kari began by pushing Tory, but were unable to turn. When they introduced changes to replicate the movie scene more closely—wet pavement, bald rear tires on the cab—they obtained the same result. However, one last test with Tory pushing caused the cars to overshoot the turn and veer off in the opposite direction. Grant hypothesized that this result was due to the fact that the cab had rear-wheel drive, while the sedan had all-wheel drive; the cab's rear wheels slid out when it lost traction in the attempted turn.
...complete a 180-degree spin.	Confirmed	After receiving some tips in defensive driving, Tory pushed Grant and Kari at 50 mph (80 km/h) toward a patch of wet pavement. When they turned their steering wheels in opposite directions, the cars went through a 180-degree spin, suffering some damage to their wheels and tires. Grant explained that the film maneuver was accomplished with extensive car modifications and a stunt driver.

== Episode 182 – "Swinging Pirates" ==
- Original air date: April 15, 2012

=== Pirate Swing ===
Adam and Jamie attempted to re-create a scene in the film Pirates of the Caribbean: Dead Man's Chest. They set out to determine whether a group of six people in a suspended spherical cage could...

Myth statement	Status	Notes
...swing over to one side of a ravine, using only their own body weight.	Busted	They built a cage from steel tubing and tested it for safety and ability to swing, then took it to a firefighter training facility with a building that could be used as a cliff. With the cage hanging on an 80 ft (24 m) cable held up by a construction crane, they were unable to get it to swing on their own. Four circus trapeze performers were brought in to replicate the size of the group in the film scene, but the six still could not reach the building. One final attempt with the cable shortened to 40 ft (12 m) failed as well, so Adam and Jamie declared this portion of the myth busted.
...grab and hold on to vines on the ravine's vertical face.	Plausible	A section of rope rigging was hung from the building to represent the vines in the movie scene. When the crew hauled the cage back and let it swing over, the six prisoners were able to grab hold and keep their grip.
...climb to the top of the ravine.	Plausible	They climbed 12 ft (3.7 m) to the top of the rigging and pulled down a Jolly Roger flag hung there.

=== Ballistics Barrel ===
Myth statement	Status	Notes
A 55 US gal (208 L) oil drum filled with 4 US gal (15 L) of methanol can be fitted with wheels and ignited to propel it at high speed as a go-kart.	Busted	Full-sized drum to test Ballistics Barrel At the bomb range, the Build Team attached a drum to a wheeled dolly and ignited the methanol remotely with a road flare. Their attempts only caused the kart to move a few feet, so they returned to the workshop for small-scale testing. Reducing the fuel/air ratio allowed a slight improvement in distance, but bubbling air into the methanol (for better vapor mixing) gave a much larger increase until the kart set itself and the test track on fire. When the team attached a funnel-shaped exhaust nozzle and injected the fuel through an atomizer (creating a pulse jet engine), they could safely propel the kart to a distance of 15 ft (4.6 m). For the second full-scale test, they attached the nozzle to a full-sized drum, fitted a scuba air tank to operate the atomizer, and mounted bicycle wheels for reduced friction. This design only moved in short bursts of acceleration and achieved a top speed of 5 mph (8.0 km/h). Declaring the myth busted, they brought in pulse jet expert Robert Maddox to upgrade the engine; his design propelled the kart to 50 mph (80 km/h).

== Episode 183 – "Battle of the Sexes" ==
- Original air date: April 22, 2012

Adam, Jamie, and the Build Team explored five myths concerning the superiority of one gender or the other in various activities. For each myth, they chose 10 men and 10 women.

Myth statement	Status	Notes
Men are better overall drivers, but break the speed limit more often.	Confirmed (1st half) / Busted (2nd half)	Adam and Jamie had the volunteers drive a police vehicle course, accompanied by a professional instructor who graded them on a 100-point scale. Volunteers did not speak and wore special clothing to disguise their genders. The men earned a higher average score (79, vs. 71 for women); in addition, seven of the men broke the speed limit, while nine of the women did.
Women are better at reading people's emotions based on their eyes.	Confirmed	Adam, Jamie, and the Build Team had their pictures taken while showing expressions for five different emotions. Jamie's pictures were not used because his expression did not change noticeably from one picture to the next (it was later revealed that Jamie faked his inability to show emotions, as can be seen in this video). The eyes of the other pictures were displayed to the volunteers, who had to guess the emotions. The women responded more quickly than the men and achieved a higher average number of correct responses (10.6 vs. 9.6).
Men are better at cooking on an outdoor grill.	Busted	Adam and Jamie set up four outdoor grilling stations and split the volunteers into groups of four to cook at the same time. Provided with the same ingredients, each had one hour to cook the same four dishes—vegetables, a chicken drumstick, a hamburger, and a steak. Adam, Jamie, and Ric Gilbert, a California Barbecue Association Hall of Fame Pit Master and Certified BBQ Judge, evaluated the food on a 100-point scale without knowing the cooks' genders. Average scores were 46 for the men and 42 for the women; Adam and Jamie decided that the difference was not large enough to declare that either gender was better at grilling.
Men are better at following maps.	Busted	The Build Team selected the start and end points for a highway drive and marked them on a map. Each volunteer studied the map for five minutes, then rode along to give directions to the destination as Grant drove. Kari and Tory, in the back seat, graded the performances on a 100-point scale and penalized for mistakes such as backtracking and excess mileage. The men and women earned a 74 and 77 average, respectively, too close to indicate an advantage for either gender.
Men are better at packing a car for a road trip.	Confirmed	Adam and Jamie brought in two similar cars, put together a load of luggage that would fit into either of them, and split the volunteers into 10 man/woman pairs. The load contained a combination of bulky and fragile items, as well as a doll to stand in for a baby. Pairs of volunteers had 15 minutes to pack separate cars, after which Adam drove them through a course while Jamie and Kari evaluated the overall quality of the packing jobs on a 100-point scale. The average score for the men was 51, while the women scored 45, with the men being able to pack the cars slightly faster, suggesting slightly better performance for the men.

== Episode 184 – "Driving in Heels" ==
- Original air date: April 29, 2012

=== Driving Dangerously ===
Myth statement	Status	Notes
Certain types of footwear can seriously impair a person's ability to drive.	Busted	Adam and Jamie tried six different footwear types in a driving simulator to measure their time to move from the accelerator to the brake pedal. The three that gave the slowest times—high heels, wedges, and snow boots—were chosen for full-scale testing. After practicing a variety of stunt driving techniques, they laid out a course and drove it in both their regular shoes and each of the three chosen footwear types. None of them affected their lap times by more than two seconds, leading them to decide that footwear had no effect on driving performance and classify the myth as busted.
Driving with a full bladder is as dangerous as driving under the influence of alcohol.	Busted	They set up a typical driver-education course and Adam drove it twice, with Jamie evaluating his performance on a 100-point scale. For the first run, Adam drank enough water to put a severe strain on his bladder, as indicated by a medical ultrasound scan. Before the second, he drank enough alcohol to put himself just below the legal limit for intoxication in California (0.08% BAC), and had a police officer ride along. He scored 70 and 25 on these two runs, respectively, and he and Jamie judged the myth as busted due to the markedly worse result from the "intoxicated" run.

=== Super Adhesive Heroics ===
Myth statement	Status	Notes
Superglue can be used to attach a room's furniture to its ceiling, creating the appearance that the room has been turned upside down.	Confirmed	The Build Team did preliminary testing in the shop to determine the amount of force that the glue could support, using a barbell rig built by Tory. One drop gave way under a weight of 650 lbf (2,891 N). Using 7 drops and a construction crane, they were able to lift a station wagon (estimated weight 4,000 lbf (17,793 N)) and keep it aloft for several seconds before it fell loose. They then built a mockup of a typical hotel room and gave themselves a 6-hour time limit to secure all the furniture to the ceiling, with sheets, cushions, and other items glued in their proper places. Although a few items gave them trouble, including a television set with a waffle-pattern base and a plant in a wicker basket, they were able to finish the job in time.
Superglue is strong enough to restrain a driver during an automobile accident, without the use of a seat belt.	Busted	They chose a car with leather upholstery and placed two Buster dummies in front: the old Buster wearing a seat belt on the passenger side, and a new model (Buster 4.0) dressed in a jumpsuit and glued into the driver's seat. When Grant towed the car into a set of concrete barricades at 35 mph (56 km/h), passenger Buster survived while driver Buster came loose and hit his head on the windshield. They found, however, that the glue had held while the material of the seat and Buster's clothing had ripped away. In a second test, they dressed Buster in a rubberized wetsuit and glued him into a fiberglass racing seat in the car, with the intent of improving the materials' mechanical strength and adhesion. He still tore out of his seat on impact, leading the team to declare the myth busted at this point. For a final test, they attached one steel plate to Buster's back and a second to a specially built seat frame, to act as "ideal" surfaces for adhesion. When they glued the plates together, he stayed in his seat through impact.

== Episode 185 – "Revenge of the Myth" ==
- Original air date: May 6, 2012

Adam, Jamie, and the Build Team explore four previously tested myths, using viewer suggestions for improvement or new tests.

=== Revenge of the Water Cannon ===
Myth statement	Status	Notes
A water heater turned on its side can act as a cannon if it explodes. Based on the "Exploding Water Heater" myths from 2007 and 2009.	Confirmed	To test the destructive power of a heater, Adam and Jamie set one up at the bomb range and aimed it directly at the side of a van. When it exploded, the van was heavily damaged and knocked onto its side. They decided to build a cannon, using the force of the heater's explosion to launch a projectile. Jamie built a heavy steel breech section to contain the heater and debris, while Adam put together a 40 ft (12 m) barrel to guide the ball. For a comparison, they fired a Civil War-era cannon into a line of pallets loaded with concrete blocks, and found that it could penetrate one pallet and part of a second. A brush fire close to the range forced a brief delay in the test, after which a faulty heating element forced them to shut down for repairs. In their second test, they were able to destroy one pallet and found the ball stopped at the front edge of the second. Although their cannon did not have as much destructive potential as a real one and was not suited for practical use, they judged the myth confirmed.

=== Fireworks Man 2 ===
Myth statement	Status	Notes
The 150 ft (46 m) flight claimed in 2010's "Fireworks Man" myth could have been achieved with a better-designed flight vehicle.	Confirmed	Reviewing the earlier test footage, the Build Team decided to redesign their flight vehicle to increase its stability and reduce the effect of Buster's center of gravity. After fine-tuning their model in a NASA wind tunnel, they did a small-scale test, achieving an estimated 300 ft (91 m) altitude and 150 ft (46 m) range. They built a full-sized vehicle and launch ramp and set up at a rock quarry, placing the ramp on a ridge overlooking a lake. With 500 fireworks on the back and Buster strapped in, the vehicle achieved a straight flight that carried it 700 ft (213 m) to a touchdown on the other side of the lake. The team reversed their original "busted" decision and declared the myth confirmed. However, they also noted that a person trying it would have a very poor chance of surviving the impact on landing.

=== Bird Balance Limo ===
Myth statement	Status	Notes
A limousine balanced on the edge of a cliff can topple if a bird perches on the hood. A revisit of 2011's "Bird Balance"; in addition, viewers wanted to see the Build Team use an actual cliff for their tests.	Busted	Tory put together a 40 lb (18 kg) analog of a kori bustard, the heaviest known flying bird, while Grant built a rig to drop as many as forty 25 lb (11 kg) raw turkeys on the car hood at once. The Build Team found the balance point using a pipe fulcrum and knife edge, then positioned the car on the edge of a 300 ft (91 m) cliff. Even in high winds, the car did not tip when the bustard was dropped onto the hood, so Grant began adding one turkey at a time. It only went over the cliff after he had added 26 turkeys, for an approximate total weight of 700 lb (318 kg). The team stood by their original "busted" judgment.

=== Excavator Viral Challenge ===
A challenge from viewers to try new feats using excavators, based on "Excavator Exuberance" from 2011. Adam and Jamie attempted to...

Myth statement	Status	Notes
...thread a needle.	Confirmed	They set up a dummy and placed a needle in one hand, and attached a clamp to the excavator's bucket to hold a piece of thread. Jamie worked the machine while Adam guided him; after several minutes, the thread went through the eye of the needle.
...pour a glass of wine.	Confirmed	A wineglass and sealed bottle were placed on a table, and the bucket was fitted with an attachment to pick up and hold the bottle. Once Adam had it in position and tilted to a suitable upward angle, he shot the cap off with a paintball gun, allowing the wine to pour into the glass.

== Episode 186 – "Bouncing Bullet" ==
- Original air date: May 13, 2012

=== Bouncing Bullets ===
Myth statement	Status	Notes
A driver being chased by another car can ricochet a bullet off the road surface and up through the pursuer's floorboard to distract or injure him. Inspired by a scene in the TV series Burn Notice.	Busted	Jamie fired into the undercarriage of a suspended car at point-blank range, using a 9 mm pistol similar to those used on the show. Balloons were placed inside the car to simulate enemies' bodies; after several shots at a vulnerable area, he successfully broke one of them. He and Adam then fired into pavement at various angles, measuring the speed and angle of the ricochets. A 16-degree angle gave the best overall performance, and the ricochet was able to penetrate a wheel well section set up as a target. They then set up a trailer with a high-speed camera and measuring scale and towed it behind a pickup truck at 45 mph (72 km/h) as Jamie drove. When Adam fired the pistol, the speed and trajectory of the ricochet matched those from the stationary test. However, two 5-shot test runs with a target car in place of the trailer gave no penetration, due to bullets being deflected by other metal components in the underside. With the myth busted, Adam drove a car lined with bulletproof vests at 45 mph (72 km/h), triggering a pistol to shoot out one of his own tires. Although he did not immediately lose control, the tire had gone completely flat after 0.5 mi (805 m) and he was forced to stop. He and Jamie observed that shooting a pursuer's tires was much more effective than trying to bounce a shot up through the floor.

=== Shock Wave Surf ===
Myth statement	Status	Notes
The shock wave from an explosion can propel a jumping person to a distance far beyond what he could achieve on his own.	Busted	Kari and Tory measured the distance and hang time of their own long jumps to serve as a benchmark for a typical person. While they achieved an average of 12 ft (3.7 m), their hang time was only 0.5 s, too short for an explosion to have any significant effect on their trajectory. Meanwhile, Grant built a nitrogen cannon to propel Buster and adjusted it to match the range and hang time of world-record jumpers (25 ft (7.6 m) and 1.0 s). For full-scale testing, the Build Team set Buster up 50 ft (15 m) from an explosion site and fitted a trigger to set off the blast 0.5 s after he had jumped. A control run with no explosive gave a range of 27 ft (8 m); this result did not change when a 10 lb (4.5 kg) charge of C-4 was used. Switching to the lower-velocity explosive ANFO in 10, 25, and 100 lb (4.5, 11.3, and 45.4 kg) quantities did not improve his range. Finally, Tory built a steel frame and attached a blanket, sprayed with truck bedliner resin, to serve as a shock wave catcher and strapped Buster to it. Both a control run and a test with 100 lb (45 kg) ANFO gave a range of 23 ft (7.0 m), leading the team to judge the myth busted.

== Episode SP18 – "Mailbag Special" ==
- Original air date: May 20, 2012

The Build Team answers a series of randomly chosen letters sent in by viewers, answering questions and doing a series of short tests.

=== Questions and Comments ===
Question/Topic	Notes
Is it good to start with a bang? (Based on "Better to End with a Bang" from 2008)	The team built a mockup of an office cubicle, placed Buster at the desk, and set off a 1 lb (454 g) charge of C4. After watching the explosion, they concluded that starting with a bang was indeed good.
Blueprint drawings used to introduce segments	Crew member Eric Haven inherited the job from the team, drawing on his experience as a comic book artist.
Favorite high-speed camera footage	Grant: Car skipping across the surface of a pond from "Car Skip", 2009; Tory: Adam falling off a treadmill from "Stone Cold Sober", 2008; Consensus: Exploding cement truck from "Cement Mix-Up", 2005 (although no high-speed footage was recorded due to a camera glitch)
Is Jamie really as stoic as he appears on the show?	The team members commented that he occasionally shows excitement in his own subdued way.
Favorite tool in the shop	Kari: Plasma cutter Grant: Forklift customized with mecanum wheels Tory: Portable cutoff saw
Favorite moment on the show	Grant: Racing a remote-controlled car against a second car dropped from a helicopter in "Racing Gravity", 2009; hitting a car with a pickup truck front end mounted on a rocket sled in "Binary Fender Bender", 2011; Kari: Tory being towed behind a cruise ship in "Supersize Cruise Ship Waterskiing", 2007
A request for details on filming explosions; a request to determine whether a washing machine or clothes dryer gave a better explosion when blown up with a 1 lb (454 g) charge of C4.	To answer both letters at once, the team took a camera crew out to the bomb range and showed the mechanics of setting up camera angles. Although the two explosions appeared very similar and destroyed one of the cameras, the team chose the dryer as being slightly more impressive.
Favorite machine built for the show	Grant: Sword-swinging robot (first used in "Catching a Sword", 2007); Kari: Giant hamster ball ("Beat the Guard Dog", 2007)
A viewer-submitted trivia quiz about past episodes	Adam gave the quiz as a series of buzz-in questions, with Kari winning by a large margin, Grant coming in second, and Tory coming in third
Most surprising moment on the show	Tory: Busting of "Bull in a China Shop", 2007; Kari: Positive result (ruled Plausible) of "Chinese Invasion Alarm", 2005
Use of animals in myth testing	Some animals have proven easier to work with than others.
Most embarrassing moment on the show	Grant: Stripping down to his underwear; vomiting on camera Tory: Wearing a bra; failing to jump a bicycle over a toy wagon Kari: Acting as the subject for a test of whether girls pass gas (see Franklin's Kite, 2006)

=== Myths and Tests ===
Myth	Status	Notes
It is impossible to swallow a spoonful of ground cinnamon without drinking any water. (Cinnamon challenge)	Busted	Each team member tried to swallow a spoonful, with medical personnel standing by. Kari and Grant coughed and spat out large clouds of powder, with Grant vomiting up a small amount as well. Tory tucked his spoonful into his cheek and eventually managed to swallow it after letting enough saliva accumulate in his mouth. The team commented, however, that this activity was very uncomfortable and dangerous, due to the powder's tendency to absorb saliva and potential to cause respiratory infections.
A van loaded with leaking containers of flammable gases can explode when it receives a signal from its keyless remote. (A previously unaired segment entitled "Vanishing Van".)	Confirmed	The team filled a van with gas containers and rigged these for a slow leak. They triggered the remote and were shocked when the van instantly blew apart, confirming the myth on the first try. The segment was shelved since the quick result gave no chance for the team to expand on the myth's background or the processes involved.
Which will fall faster, a sixpack of light beer or regular beer?	They fall at the same rate	The team hoisted a sixpack of cans of each beer type up on a construction crane and dropped them at the same time from 100 ft (30 m). After the packs landed at the same time, they switched to sixpacks of bottles and got the same result. Tests with other objects, including a piano, a grandfather clock, and a toilet, showed no differences in time to hit the ground.
A bullet from a .50 caliber Desert Eagle pistol cannot penetrate 25 watermelons.	Confirmed	Tory and Kari set up a line of melons, but Kari's shot only penetrated the first three. They noted the parallels between this test and the use of a .50 caliber sniper rifle during "Bulletproof Water" (2005), in which the bullet could not reach a target past a few feet of water.

== Episode 187 – "Bubble Pack Plunge" ==
- Original air date: June 3, 2012

=== Bubble Boy ===
Myth statement	Status	Notes
A person covered in bubble wrap can jump off a 35 ft (11 m) building and survive the impact without injury. Based on a viral video.	Busted	Adam and Jamie started by fitting Buster with accelerometers and dropping him from 35 ft (11 m) to determine his survivability. A control drop with no bubble wrap gave an impact force of 300 g, while covering him with 4 in (10.2 cm) of wrap as in the video gave 260 g. Both results were well above the maximum survivable force of 75 g. They decided to do small-scale tests in order to determine the amount and/or type of wrap needed to make the landing safe (defined as 10 g or less), dropping a human analog onto the wrap instead of covering it. Using a fall height of 6 ft (1.8 m) and a plastic pipe filled with cannonballs, they found that 16 in (41 cm) of wrap gave between 22 and 25 g. Further tests on Buster from 15 ft (4.6 m) allowed them to design an alternating layer/coil wrapping design that reduced the impact to 15 g. Under Jamie's supervision, the crew fitted Adam with safety equipment, covered him in three layers of this design, and dropped him from 15 ft (4.6 m). The resulting force on landing was 9 g; however, Adam found the total weight of the padding (150 lb (68 kg)) very uncomfortable and hit his head on the support board underneath him. When Buster was wrapped up and dropped from the full 35 ft (11 m), he experienced forces of 29 g (torso) and 48 g (head), indicating that he would survive with some degree of injury. Since the circumstances shown in the video would have proven fatal, Adam and Jamie declared the myth busted.

=== Bond Car Flip ===
Myth statement	Status	Notes
If a car equipped with a rocket-powered ejector seat is flipped upside down, it can right itself by firing the seat into the ground. Based on a scene in the James Bond film Die Another Day.	Busted	Examining the film scene, the Build Team decided to use enough rockets to launch the seat to a height of 20 to 25 ft (6.1 to 7.6 m). They obtained a car similar to the one in the scene, modified it to accept an ejector seat, and fitted it with enough rockets to generate 800 lbf (3,559 N) of thrust. A test on the right-side-up car succeeded, but filled the passenger compartment with smoke and flames. After resetting the seat and turning the car upside down, the team fired the rockets but the car did not move at all. Grant noted that the rockets' thrust was too small compared to the car's weight (approximately 4000 lbs). A second test, with enough rockets added to generate this much thrust, still failed to flip the car and also set the interior on fire. Declaring the myth busted, they explained that the effect in the film had been produced using a high-pressure nitrogen cannon rather than a rocket. They then built one themselves which successfully flipped the car.

== Episode 188 – "Duel Dilemmas" ==
- Original air date: June 10, 2012

=== Duel Dilemma ===
Myth statement	Status	Notes
A person armed with a knife cannot win a fight against one carrying a pistol.	Busted	As Jamie practiced knife-throwing techniques, Adam made a leather belt holster and worked on quick-drawing with a paintball pistol. Based on a scene in The Magnificent Seven, they then faced off against each other, standing 16 ft (4.9 m) apart; Jamie used water balloons with the same weight as his knives, and both attacked at the firing of a starter pistol. Though Jamie was consistently able to throw his "knife" before Adam pulled the trigger, after several trials Adam was able to shoot Jamie and dodge the thrown balloon. Next they investigated the scenario of a charging knife wielder. Adam and Jamie determined that Jamie could run 24 ft (7.3 m) before Adam could draw, cock, and fire his pistol. When Jamie ran at Adam with a foam knife from this distance, Adam was able to shoot him; a second test at 20 ft (6.1 m) gave the same result. However, when Jamie started at distances of 16 ft (4.9 m) or less, he successfully stabbed Adam without being shot. They decided that a knife wielder at close quarters could have an advantage over a gunfighter, depending on the circumstances, and declared the myth busted.
In a sword fight, the first person to attack will lose.	Busted	After Adam and Jamie received kendo training, Adam built a rig to randomly determine whether he or Jamie would have to attack first, and a second one to indicate when a hit had been scored. Each of 20 bouts ended in either a tie or a victory (defined as being the first to land a blow to the head) for the person who attacked first.

=== Fire Dragon ===
Myth statement	Status	Notes
A primitive two-stage missile called the "Fire Dragon", which could discharge a salvo of rocket-propelled arrows, existed in 14th-century China.	Plausible	Kari built two models for small-scale testing, one based on historical drawings, the other with changes to make it more aerodynamic. When placed in a NASA wind tunnel, the first model proved to be highly unstable, but the second did not. For a full-scale model, Tory built an internal quiver to hold the arrows and designed an ignition system to fire them off all at once. The system performed well in the blast chamber, launching the arrows with enough force to embed them deep in the wall. Building the Fire Dragon to an overall length of 6 ft (1.8 m), the Build Team took it into the desert to fine-tune the ignition timing. The goal was to launch the arrows at the peak of the flight, using a fuse cut to an appropriate length; although the stabilizing fins fell off in midair, the arrows did launch at once. After a Fire Dragon warhead achieved a range of 800 yd (732 m), as opposed to a single rocket arrow's 650 yd (594 m), the team set up 10 of the weapons and aimed them at a group of dummies and a castle wall 800 yd (732 m) downrange. Seven of the arrow salvos fired, but only a few arrows landed in the target zone and no targets were hit. The team classified the existence of the Fire Dragon as plausible, but noted that the weapon was highly unreliable.

== Episode 189 – "Hollywood Gunslingers" ==
- Original air date: June 17, 2012

Adam, Jamie, Tory, Kari and Grant explored eight firearm-related movie scenarios.

Myth statement	Status	Notes
Bullets can retain lethal speed when fired into several feet of water. Based on a scene in the film Mission: Impossible – Ghost Protocol.	Busted	Adam and Jamie presented footage from 2005's "Bulletproof Water" to demonstrate the manner in which bullets quickly lost speed after being fired into water.
Firing a bullet into the side of an airplane at altitude can cause a large amount of suction that massively expands the bullet hole and sucks out the passengers.	Busted	This was mentioned in the SBS version of the episode. Adam and Jamie presented footage from 2004's "Explosive Decompression", in which they failed to create a significant hole in a plane with a bullet despite the pressure differential, and only managed to damage the plane to the required extent by using actual explosives.

=== Unlimited Ammo ===
Myth statement	Status	Notes
The length of a typical action-movie gunfight is realistic.	Busted	The Build Team chose four fully automatic weapons for testing: MAC-10 and Uzi machine pistols, and AK-47 and M16 rifles. It took them 2 seconds to fire a full magazine from each weapon. For the MAC-10 and Uzi, it took 10 seconds to empty two magazines; Grant needed a total of 27 seconds to fire four magazines from the Uzi. The team remarked that the short firing times made the movie firefights ridiculously long unless the participants had access to vast stores of ammunition.

=== Hollywood Stances ===
Myth statement	Status	Notes
Hollywood Stances: A person firing two pistols simultaneously, rather than alternating left/right hand shots, can hit targets more effectively than a person holding one pistol in a two-handed stance. A revisit of "Firearm Fashion" from 2011.	Confirmed	Adam and Jamie fired a pair of pistols with 8-round magazines, using a 10-point scale based on speed and accuracy as in the 2011 test. They averaged 8.1 against a single target, 7.4 against two separate targets. Both of these results were higher than the 7.3 average from a control run using a single pistol in a two-handed stance.

=== MAC-10 vs. Stairs ===
Myth statement	Status	Notes
A MAC-10 dropped down a flight of stairs can start firing by itself. Based on a scene in the film True Lies.	Busted	Grant and Tory set up a flight of stairs and a rig to drop a MAC-10 (loaded with blanks) at the top. Two tests with different drop heights failed to cause a discharge; Grant commented that the movie weapon may have been fitted with a hair trigger or other modifications to set it off.

=== Nailgun Gun ===
Myth statement	Status	Notes
A nail gun can inflict wounds as lethal as a firearm. Based on a scene in the 2006 James Bond movie Casino Royale.	Busted	For a control run, Tory fired a 9 mm pistol at a target from 14 ft (4.3 m), and achieved a 2.5 in (6.4 cm) grouping with several shots penetrating fully. A test with the nail gun gave similar accuracy, but the nails only bounced off; when he fired from 7 ft (2.1 m), only a few of them penetrated shallowly.

=== Action vs. Reaction ===
Myth statement	Status	Notes
In a gunfight, the person who draws second has a better chance of winning.	Busted	The Build Team measured their time to draw and fire a double-action pistol on their own ("action"), then to do the same once a red light came on ("reaction"). Kari and Tory both registered significantly shorter "reaction" than "action" times, so Adam and Jamie set up a trial to factor in the effect of a live enemy shooting back. Armed with paintball pistols and facing off at 10 ft (3.0 m), they carried out six showdowns, with each man firing first in three and second in the other three. In every trial, the man who drew first was also first to fire, but most of them were nearly simultaneous. They noted that two equally matched gunfighters would probably end up killing each other.

=== Weird Bullets ===
Myth statement	Status	Notes
Bullets made of silver or engraved with an enemy's name can be as effective as unmodified ammunition. Based on various scenes in the James Bond movie The Man with the Golden Gun.	Busted (silver) / Confirmed (engraved)	The Build Team brought in a firearms expert to fire an M1 Garand rifle at a target 100 ft (30 m) away, backed with clay blocks behind the center of mass to determine penetrating power. A control run with standard lead bullets gave high accuracy and easily punched through the clay. Three shots with silver bullets struck far off center, while the engraved rounds performed as well as the lead ones. Kari noted that because silver tends to shrink and deform as it cools after molding, those bullets may have acquired shape irregularities that affected their flight.

=== Hero Never Hit ===
Myth statement	Status	Notes
Someone who is running through gunfire will never be hit.	Busted	The Build Team set up an obstacle course for Tory to run through while Grant and Kari fired paintball guns at him. He lasted 6 seconds before being hit when he ran the course unarmed. During a second trial, in which he was given a gun and could shoot back, he lasted 32 seconds and managed to hit both Grant and Kari in that time.

=== What Is Bulletproof? ===
Myth statement	Status	Notes
Various items are bulletproof.	Various results	Footage from past myth testing of what items can or cannot stop a bullet.

== Episode SP19 – "Jawsome Shark Special" ==
- Original air date: August 13, 2012

To celebrate the 25th anniversary of Shark Week on the Discovery Channel, Adam and Jamie counted down their 25 favorite shark-related myths, including some that had not previously aired.

Number	Title (in countdown)	Myth(s) or episode(s) featured	Result	Comments
25	Fighting Back	Jaws Special (2005); Eye Gouge (2008)	Plausible	Buster, then Jamie, then Adam each had a chance to drive sharks away by punching the snout and trying to gouge the eyes.
24	Super Senses	—N/a	—N/a	In addition to possessing acute senses, sharks can detect electromagnetic fields from their prey by using the ampullae of Lorenzini located in their snouts.
23	Chili	Spicy Salsa Shark Shield (2008)	Busted	Testing hot peppers as a shark repellent
22	Magnets	Animal Magnetism (2008)	Busted	Magnets proved effective at repelling baby sharks, but not full-grown ones.
21	Dolphins	Supersize Shark (2007)	Confirmed	Myth: The presence of dolphins will deter sharks from attacking prey.
20	Super Strength	Jaws Special (2005)	Busted	A diving shark tethered to flotation barrels can pull them underwater and keep them submerged.
19	Super Strength	Jaws Special (2005)	Confirmed	A shark can ram a boat with enough force to punch a hole in its hull.
18	Shark Stop	—N/a	Busted	Myth: Sharks will die of asphyxiation if they do not keep moving at all times. Although some can die in this manner, most cannot.
17	Ancient Relics	—N/a	Busted	Myth: Sharks have existed for 400 million years with no changes in their body structure. Although sharks have existed for that long, their current form emerged roughly 100 million years ago.
16	The Smell of Fear	—N/a	Busted	Myth: Sharks can smell a single drop of blood in a swimming pool. They did not respond to human blood, but did notice a drop of fish blood diluted 1 million times. However, the volume of water in a typical pool would dilute the blood billions of times and make it even harder to detect.
15	Matching Sharks	—N/a	Busted	Myth: All sharks have the same streamlined body shape and carnivorous feeding habits. Adam and Jamie presented facts about shark species that do not fit one or the other of these traits.
14	The Yummy Hum	Supersize Shark (2007)	Busted	Myth: A particular sound frequency (40 Hz) strongly attracts sharks.
13	Dog's Breakfast	Dog Bait (2008)	Busted	Building a robotic dog that could swim and release scents to match a real one. A dog owner volunteered to let the cast use his pet, but they decided not to take the risk of having a shark eat it.
12	Flapping Fish	Fish Flap (2008)	Confirmed	Test stopped early for Jamie's safety (he was in a child's rubber boat on the ocean, with increasingly aggressive sharks closing in)
11	—N/a	Jaws Special (2005)	Confirmed	Jamie's first time in a shark cage, testing the myth that it could be damaged or destroyed if a shark hit it at high enough speed
10	Shark Bite	—N/a	No result	Various claims about the strength of a shark's bite. Adam and Jamie built a bite force tester, but could not get any sharks to bite on it.
9	RC Shark	—N/a	Busted	Inspired by the results of No. 22, Jamie tried to use a system of magnets to control the movements of a baby shark, without success.
8	Sandpaper Shark	—N/a	Confirmed	Myth: Sharkskin can be used in place of sandpaper. The cast was able to use a piece of skin to smooth pieces of wood, first by hand and then with a rotary sander.
7	Black Powder Shark	Black Powder Shark (2008)	Busted	A myth inspired by the film Deep Blue Sea
6	A Knight's Tale	—N/a	Busted	Myth: Full plate armor can protect a diver against sharks. When Adam put on the armor and dived in, many sharks were attracted to him, possibly drawn by the electromagnetic fields due to the metal (see No. 24).
5	Yum Yum Yellow	—N/a	Busted	Myth: Sharks are attracted to the color yellow. The cast dropped several containers of bait, painted in different colors, and found no difference in the number of sharks drawn to each.
4	Night Dive	Fatal Flashlight (2008)	Plausible	Comments from the Build Team on having to dive at night
3	Exploding Jaws	Jaws Special (2005)	Busted	Myth: A scuba tank will explode with lethal force if shot with a rifle. Although the tank failed to explode, the air pressure caused it to rocket around the test chamber in a way that could injure a shark or drive it away.
2	Play Dead	Playing Dead (2008)	Confirmed	Adam's favorite shark moment, in which Grant and Tory had to jump into heavily chummed waters
1	Sharks Are Evil	—N/a	Busted	Adam and Jamie commented on the popular belief that sharks are evil creatures to be avoided at all costs. They pointed out the natural behavior of sharks, the high improbability of being attacked, and the large numbers that are killed every year to make shark fin soup.

== Episode 190 – "Titanic Survival" ==
- Original air date: October 7, 2012

=== A Titanic Tale ===
Myth statement	Status	Notes
Jack's death at the end of the 1997 film Titanic was preventable.	Plausible	First, Adam created a 1/4-scale recreation of Jack's death scene in a tub of salty water. With the Rose surrogate placed alone on the board, she stayed afloat, exactly as per the scene. When Adam placed the Jack surrogate on top, the board sank. Next, they investigated the feasibility of Jack and Rose's ability to withstand hypothermia for a 63-minute period, which Titanic director James Cameron stated was accurate to how long Rose's rescue took. For this test, Jamie created a human body simulaid (later dubbed "Thermo Boy") from heat coils encased in ballistics gelatin and calibrated it to regulate its temperature at 98.6 °F (37.0 °C), the human body temperature. Then they conducted two tests with the simulaid in different 29 °F (−2 °C) conditions: one in water, and one in air with wet clothing. In the first test, the simulaid dropped to 84.4 °F (29.1 °C) within 51 minutes, at which point they determined that Jack would have hypothermically lost all motor control and drowned. But in the second test, after the 63-minute mark, the simulaid's temperature was 82.5 °F (28.1 °C), which was survivable. Finally, Adam and Jamie posed as Jack and Rose, respectively, and tried to climb onto a board modified to accommodate their superior weight. Although Jamie managed to fit on just fine, when Adam tried to climb on with him, the board was unable to support them. Then they got the idea to remove Jamie's life vest and strap it to the underside of the board, which increased its buoyancy enough to support the two, leading them to declare the myth plausible. But James Cameron said that while that meant the prop designers had gotten the size wrong, the script from the movie said that Jack had to die.

=== Rocket Surfer ===
Myth statement	Status	Notes
A Californian surfer strapped a rocket to the back of a surfboard and was able to ride it at 20 mph (32 km/h) for 30 seconds.	Busted	The Build Team attached Buster to a surfboard with a rocket motor attached to the end. When they tested it, however, the surfboard backflipped almost immediately, due to the high amount of initial thrust and the fact that the surfboard setup was back-heavy. They decided to test a scenario where the surfer had strapped multiple rockets in stages. Due to Tory's eagerness to ride a rocket-powered surfboard, Grant and Kari repeatedly had him stand on a skateboard and subjected it to various G-forces; at 0.8 Gs, Tory fell off instantly. Then they went and tested a surfboard with 20 fireworks strapped to it, and it pulled 0.6 Gs for three seconds. Finally, they strapped over 200 fireworks to another surfboard, and when Tory rode it, he managed to hold on for a brief moment before falling off the board. Because he failed to make it to 20 mph, and he couldn't hang on for 30 seconds, the team declared the myth busted.

== Episode 191 – "Trench Torpedo" ==
- Original air date: October 14, 2012

=== Trench Torpedo ===
Myth statement	Status	Notes
Trenches dug during World War I were designed to bend at sharp right angles to reduce the impact of an explosive shock wave.	Plausible	First, Adam and Jamie created a small-scale experiment using three tanks filled with water and mineral oil to outline the differences in the wave patterns; the first tank was designed straight, the second with two sharp right angles, and the third with two rounded right angles. When waves were created at one end of each tank, the respective amplitudes at the other end were measured at 3/4", 1/8" and 1/4". Next, they dug three trenches with the same shapes as the tanks, and lined the walls with color-coded plywood to both distinguish the trenches from each other and compensate the shapes as much as possible. Finally, they began testing with explosives, first with an aboveground control, in which sensors at 20, 30, 40 and 50 ft (6, 9, 12 and 15 m) registered pressure differentials of 39, 12, 7 and 5 psi (269, 83, 48 and 34 kPa), respectively. In the straight trench test, the same sensors registered 397, 65, 38 and 21 psi (2,737, 448, 262 and 145 kPa). The sharp-angled trench test showed pressure differentials of 60, 19, 12 and 7 psi (414, 131, 83 and 48 kPa). Finally, the round-angled trench test yielded pressure differentials of 76, 21, 13 and 8 psi (524, 145, 90 and 55 kPa). Because the sharp-angled trench showed the lowest pressure readings out of the three trench tests, Adam and Jamie dubbed the myth plausible.

=== Party Balloon Pile-Up ===
Myth statement	Status	Notes
If a clown car stuffed with balloons crashes, the balloons will act as an airbag and make the crash survivable.	Busted	To simulate a car crash at 35 mph (56 km/h), the Build Team dropped a car with two clown-dressed crash test dummies bumper-first from a height of 41 ft (12 m). In their first crash test, in which they used no balloons, the passenger experienced 340 Gs on his head and 630 Gs on his chest, both of which would be fatal. In their second crash test, with the car stuffed with helium balloons, the passenger suffered head and chest impacts of 350 and 620 Gs, respectively. To investigate the suitabilities of different balloon configurations to cushion the clown passengers, Grant built a rig to drop 50 lb (23 kg) of weight on the balloons inside a large polycarbonate tube. In a control test with no balloons, the weight pulled 100 Gs at impact. They then tested with the same balloon setup as in their previous car crash test, which only reduced the impact to 98 Gs, popping all of the balloons in the process. However, subsequent tests with separate configurations of balloon "animals", small balloons and large balloons yielded respective impacts of 6, 2.8 and 2 Gs. But in a car crash test with the best-performing balloons (the large ones), the passenger suffered 115 Gs on the head and 130 Gs on the chest, both of which would still have been fatal impacts. Despite calling the myth busted at that point, the team continued testing with various balloon configurations of their own designs. They tested a large ball constructed from balloons made to resemble smoked sausages, built by Kari; a giant makeshift balloon bubble wrap, built by Grant; and giant mylar balloons stuffed with smaller latex balloons, built by Tory. When tested in the polycarbonate tube, the three designs showed respective impact results of 3.8, 1.7 and 2.8 Gs. But when Grant's design, the best performing of the three, was tested in a car crash, the passenger pulled 220 Gs on the head and 230 Gs on the chest, a larger impact than the large balloons.

== Episode 192 – "Hail Hijinx" ==
- Original US air date: October 21, 2012
- Original Australia air date: September 3, 2012

This episode was also called "Cliffhanger Bridge Boom" in Australia.

=== Cliffhanger Bridge Boom ===
Myth statement	Status	Notes
It is possible to jump to safety on a collapsing rope bridge. Based on a scene in the film Cliffhanger.	Busted	For small-scale testing, Adam and Jamie built a model bridge with a gas-powered piston to represent the jumper. They rigged one end of the bridge to collapse and fired the piston after a set delay, measuring the jump height. A control run gave a height of 22 in (56 cm), and delays of 50 and 100 ms resulted in jumps of 10 and 4.5 in (25 and 11 cm), respectively; longer delays gave no time for a jump. A second series of tests using an angled jump showed the same trend. They built a full-size, 80 ft (24 m) bridge from planks and steel cables and strung it up across a dry dock at Mare Island Naval Shipyard. Jamie stood near one end, ran toward it as the other end blew out, and tried to jump for the end bar after taking two more steps. He fell as soon as the bridge collapsed, and a second attempt (with Adam standing closer to the end and trying to jump for the bar) also failed. They noted that as soon as the cables were cut, the bridge lost the tension holding it up and the jumper's support was gone. They declared the myth busted at this point, but Jamie wondered if a person could simply hold on to the handrails. Once the rope rails were wrapped with tape, he ran toward the end as the bridge fell and was able to hold on. He tried to climb up, but tired and slipped down when he was just short of the edge. However, Jamie joked that he probably would have succeeded if he genuinely thought his life was on the line.

=== Hail Hijinks ===
Myth statement	Status	Notes
A strong enough hailstorm can sink a boat.	Plausible (just barely)	The Build Team investigated two possibilities, puncturing the hull versus having so much hail pile up that the boat could lose buoyancy. While Grant built a cannon to launch hailstones, Tory learned about their potential size and destructive power and Kari crafted baseball-size ice balls. Tests with aluminum, fiberglass, and wood hulls at speeds of 80, 150 and 300 mph (129, 241 and 483 km/h) did not lead to any punctures, except in one test when a shot struck a rotted patch on the wood hull. These speeds matched the terminal velocity of a falling hailstone, the wind during a severe hailstorm, and the highest recorded wind speed in a tornado. At the Port of San Francisco, the team put a boat in the water and began dumping ice into it. The boat only began to sink after more than 4,000 lb (1,814 kg) of ice had been added, more than the world record hail-fall of 4 ft (1.2 m) in a single afternoon. However, it then bobbed up to the surface due to buoyancy forces that allowed the ice to float free of the boat once it was underwater. The team decided to explore a third scenario, having a hailstone land in the boat while it was in the water. Grant set his cannon up to fire vertically downward into a floating boat, using the fiberglass and wood hulls. The fiberglass did not break at 300 mph (483 km/h), while the wood did puncture and take on water. A second test at 80 mph (129 km/h) did not puncture the wood, but a final shot at 150 mph (241 km/h) did. They classified the myth as plausible, noting the specific set of circumstances needed to sink a boat.

== Episode 193 – "Fright Night" ==
- Original air date: October 28, 2012

=== The Haunted Hum ===
Myth statement	Status	Notes
A particular, inaudible sound frequency can lead people to believe that an area is haunted.	Busted	Adam and Jamie chose a frequency of 19 hertz (just below the bottom threshold of human hearing). They then found four cabins at an abandoned club resort in the woods and set up speakers to play the sound in only one of them. Jamie subjected himself to the sound and reported feeling unnerved. Disguised as an old groundskeeper, Adam met with 10 volunteers and asked them to go into the cabins, saying that something bad had happened in one of them. One at a time, the volunteers spent 3 minutes sitting in each cabin, then made their guess as to which one Adam was referring to. After only 2 of them guessed correctly, Adam and Jamie judged the myth busted, but noted that having all 10 volunteers visit the cabins in the same order may have affected the results.

=== The Smell of Fear ===
Myth statement	Status	Notes
Humans give off a detectable scent when they are sufficiently scared.	Plausible	For comparison purposes, each Build Team member collected sweat samples from him/herself while exercising on a treadmill. After choosing three fan-submitted torments at random, each member spent 7 minutes in a transparent coffin with one of them. Kari was covered with 30 scorpions, Tory with 20 snakes, Grant with 50 rats. All sweat samples from both sets of runs were stored in a freezer to prevent degradation. The team brought in 12 volunteers and had each one smell 6 pairs of samples, guessing which (if any) samples in each pair were fear sweat. None of the volunteers got more than 2 out of 6 right, but odor scientist Pamela Dalton correctly guessed 5 out of 6 when she took the test. To obtain a fresh sample of fear sweat, Tory rappelled to the bottom of a 165 ft (50 m) vertical shaft in Moaning Cavern, fighting acrophobia as he descended. That sample was shuffled with 19 non-fear ones, and Pamela attempted to pick out the fear sweat sample from the group of 20. Even though she did not succeed, the team classified the myth as plausible, noting the need for years of experience in the field of odor detection.

=== Dead Body Disposal ===
Adam and Jamie investigated two myths based on movie scenes involving the transportation and burial of dead bodies.

Myth statement	Status	Notes
It is easy to carry a dead body.	Plausible	Adam and Jamie set up an obstacle course to run with a 150 lb (68 kg) simulated cadaver. They had to pick it up from a dinner table; put it into a closet and take it out again; drag it to a window and push it through; drag it up a flight of stairs, along a platform, and down another flight; and finally wrap it up in a carpet and stuff it into a car trunk. For a control run, each man ran the course using a wad of steel chain with the same weight as the cadaver. Adam posted a time of 3:06; Jamie struggled at the window and finished in 4:33. Both of them began to tire noticeably toward the end of the run. With the cadaver, though, they made much better time due to its weight distribution. Adam finished in 1:20, Jamie in 1:55, leading them to call the myth plausible. Adam and Jamie noted that unlike the steel weight, cadavers are actually much easier to carry since they can be slung over the shoulder to distribute the weight more evenly, and unlike the wad of chain, the cadaver could be moved more incrementally (lifting an arm or a leg at a time, rather than the whole thing all at once).
A shallow grave can be dug in 20 minutes.	Busted	Jamie tried to dig a 2 ft (0.6 m) deep grave, but hit hard-packed earth that slowed him down greatly. It took him over 2 hours to finish digging.

== Episode 194 – "Mini Myth Medley" ==
- Original air date: November 4, 2012

Adam, Jamie, and the Build Team tested five myths chosen at random from viewer submissions.

Myth statement	Status	Notes
It is easy for a person to recognize the back of his/her own hand.	Confirmed	Adam and Jamie took pictures of the backs of 100 people's hands, 50 of each gender. Each of 12 more volunteers had a hand picture taken and mixed with 9 others of the same gender, race, and hand size/shape, and then had to try to identify it within 60 seconds. Volunteers wore gloves during the test to prevent cheating. Eleven of the 12 chose correctly, prompting Adam and Jamie to investigate the ease of identifying other body parts—namely, palms and teeth. Using the same methodology, 7 of 12 were correct on the palm test, 10 of 12 on the teeth.
The "potty dance" can help a person with a full bladder stave off the need to urinate.	Plausible	For a control run, each Build Team member came to work with a completely empty bladder, drank 2 liters of water, then measured the time until he/she could no longer resist the urge to urinate. Tory lasted 1 hr 58 min; Grant, 1 hr 58 min; Kari, 2 hr 39 min. They debated the effectiveness of the "potty dance": distracting attention from the full bladder versus putting more pressure on it. The second day, they repeated the trial but allowed themselves to do the dance. This time, Tory lasted 1:30, Grant 1:52, Kari 2:46. On the third day, they tried various methods to relax as much as possible. Tory lasted 2:05, Grant 2:46, Kari 2:43. The team judged the myth plausible, but noted that results of different methods can vary widely from person to person.

=== Monk Magic ===
Myth statement	Status	Notes
It is possible to throw a needle hard enough to penetrate a pane of glass without shattering it. Based on a viral video of a Shaolin monk performing this feat.	Busted	The Build Team started by throwing needles at panes of typical window glass, with thickness 0.125 in (3.2 mm). Their top throwing speed was 47 mph (76 km/h), but all of their needles only bounced off. San Francisco Giants pitcher Matt Cain tried next, achieving speeds up to 113 mph (182 km/h), but only bent several needles and eventually struck a large chip out of the pane. When the team switched to 0.0625 in (1.6 mm) glass, Matt was still unable to penetrate it but did manage to shatter one needle; with 0.03125 in (0.8 mm) antique glass, he smashed it on his first throw. The team declared the myth busted for human throwers at this point, but Tory modified an air rifle to fire the needles at high speed. Using 0.125 in (3.2 mm) glass, they got no result at 140 mph (225 km/h), chipped the glass at 160 mph (257 km/h), and finally punched a clean hole at 180 mph (290 km/h).

=== Underwater Bike Ride ===
Myth statement	Status	Notes
It is impossible to ride a bicycle underwater.	Busted	Adam and Jamie considered the effect of water resistance and underwater buoyancy forces on a rider's stability and balance. In the shallow end of a swimming pool, Adam was able to pedal and stay upright with his upper body above the surface. However, when he tried again at the deep end, the buoyancy caused him to tip over backwards. He donned 50 lb (23 kg) of ballast and a scuba tank, but still lost traction and was unable to turn or ride uphill without tipping. Jamie then tried to ride the bicycle himself, with the same results. They worked separately on modifications to improve traction on the uphill run. Adam added 50 lb (23 kg) of weight to his bicycle's frame and filled its tires with corn syrup to flatten them out, while Jamie mounted a 120 lb (54 kg) set of lead training wheels and attached another 20 lb (9 kg) weight in front. They laid out a race course at the bottom of the pool, but neither man was able to ride his modified bicycle on its uphill portion without using his feet to push ahead. They classified the myth as busted, since they were able to ride on flat and downhill runs.

=== Fireman Finger ===
Myth statement	Status	Notes
It is possible to break a car window using only a finger tap. Based on a firefighting viral video. (Myth only shown online and in versions of the episode aired outside the US.)	Busted	The Build Team tried it as shown in the video and failed. Declaring the myth busted at this point, they discerned that a center punch hidden in the glove was used in the video. Kari tried this method and succeeded. Tory then tried his own methods: He failed when he used a pocket massager inside the glove, but succeeded by using a drill hidden in the glove.

== Episode 195 – "Cannonball Chemistry" ==
- Original air date: November 11, 2012

=== Mattress Mayhem ===
Myth statement	Status	Notes
It is possible to survive a 35 ft (10.7 m) jump onto a mattress floating on top of a 4.5 ft (1.4 m) deep swimming pool. Based on a scene in the TV series Burn Notice.	Busted	While Adam installed an accelerometer in Buster's chest to measure g-forces on impact, Jamie set up a 35 ft (10.7 m) platform at the shallow end of a local swimming pool. They put Buster in the same position as that used on the show (buttocks first) and dropped him into the pool. He registered 50 g upon impact with the water, the threshold of potential death, and 29 g once he hit the bottom. When Adam and Jamie placed an inner-spring mattress on the water and dropped Buster, they found that the impact had increased to 86 g. They repeated the test with two simulated cadavers and brought in an orthopedic surgeon to assess the extent of injuries with a portable X-ray machine. The drop with no mattress resulted in a paralyzing spinal cord injury and shattered pelvis, while the drop onto the mattress led to even worse pelvic and spinal injuries and a dislocated knee and elbow. Declaring the myth busted at this point, Adam and Jamie decided to find out if there was a way to make the jump and survive. Jamie trained with a professional stuntman to learn jumping/landing techniques, working his way up to greater heights. When he developed severe back pain overnight, though, he left the final attempt up to the stuntman, who jumped from the full 35 ft (10.7 m) and came safely to a stop in just over 4.5 ft (1.4 m) of water.

=== Cannonball Chemistry ===
At the start of the episode, the Build Team apologized for the cannonball accident that occurred while they were testing this myth.

Myth statement	Status	Notes
Some 15th-century cannoneers used stone cannonballs instead of iron ones, to deliver the same damage but disintegrate on impact so the enemy could not reuse them.	Plausible	The Build Team fired a Civil War-era cannon, loaded with an iron ball and 1 lb (454 g) black powder, and measured a speed of 1,200 ft/s (366 m/s). Their first attempt to match that speed with their own small-scale cannon led to the accident, and the testing was immediately called off to assess damage and start an investigation. Several months later, they resumed their work at a remote rock quarry and secured permission to fire stone balls through the full-sized cannon, using a cardboard canister to protect the barrel. On the advice of a geologist, they chose sandstone, limestone, and granite for further testing and fashioned one ball from each material. They scaled down the powder charge based on each ball's weight to match the speed of the iron one, then set up pallets of bricks to stand in for a castle wall. A control test with an iron ball penetrated 2 layers of the wall and destroyed 4 bricks. The sandstone penetrated 1 layer and destroyed 2 bricks; the limestone, 1 layer and 3 bricks; the granite, 2 layers and 4 bricks. In addition, every stone ball broke apart on impact. Having found a stone that could meet both of the original criteria, the team declared the myth plausible.

== Episode 196 – "Food Fables" ==
- Original air date: November 18, 2012

=== Car Cook-Off ===
For their myths, Jamie and Adam were joined by celebrity chef Alton Brown, who is an enthusiast of incorporating science into cooking and had previously busted food myths on an episode of Good Eats reverentially titled Myth Smashers.

Myth statement	Status	Notes
It is possible to set up a holiday meal inside a car's engine compartment and drive long enough to fully cook all the food.	Confirmed	For this supersizing of frying an egg on the hood of a car, Alton surmised that they would need a large car that was a V8 to V12 - and furthermore, an older one because a newer one, as he said, would be "too plasticky." Jamie, in response to this, came up with a vintage V8 Cadillac. After fitting the car with temperature sensors, they took a 90-minute drive, escorted by the California Highway Patrol, and measured temperatures between 200 °F (93 °C) and 500 °F (260 °C), which boded well for them because that meant they had spots with ideal temperatures for different foods. They also noted that they got temperature spikes in some areas during stops in the middle of city driving. While Alton prepared the ingredients, Adam and Jamie built or modified containers to hold the dishes and Jamie added insulation under the hood where needed. They loaded the containers into the chosen spots - which included near the exhaust manifold and the transmission - and drove for 4 hours, again escorted by the CHP, stopping occasionally to check the food temperatures and re-position dishes in order to prevent overcooking. At their destination, they tasted the dishes, agreeing that if the turkey was not satisfactory, then the myth was busted. However, the cooking with the engine compartment was successful, and they ended up with a dinner that included the following dishes: Turkey breast loaves; Turkey legs confit-style with olive oil and thyme; Turkey thighs on herbs; Dressing; Cream of corn with rosemary; Sweet potatoes; Mini pumpkin pies (In an added twist, Alton had never tested the recipe in a real oven before.); Gravy soup (The only dish that did not cook as originally planned - it did not thicken, but was deemed a great soup.)

=== Tryptophan Turkey ===
Myth statement	Status	Notes
Turkey makes people sleepy due to its tryptophan content.	Busted	Kari set up a reaction-time test similar to Whac-a-Mole for Tory and Grant, with 45 seconds to hit as many targets as possible. In a control test, Tory hit 61 while Grant hit 66; after taking a dose of tryptophan, they scored 49 and 60, respectively. Assisted by a nutrition professor, Kari designed three holiday meals for the other two, to be eaten on consecutive days. After the first meal, a large one with turkey, Tory scored 47, Grant 52. The second meal had the same number of calories, but replaced turkey with protein powder mixed in the mashed potatoes, and led to scores of 48 and 42. After the third meal, identical to the first but with smaller portions, they scored 63 and 67. The Build Team judged the myth as busted, since the amount of food eaten had much more of an effect on reaction time than the turkey did.

=== Tastes Like Chicken ===
Myth statement	Status	Notes
It is easy to confuse the taste of unusual meats with that of chicken.	Busted	Kari chose various exotic meats for Tory and Grant to taste-test, then took 9 of them to chef David Lawrence so he could fry them along with a batch of chicken. With the others blindfolded, Kari fed each of them 20 samples (9 exotic, 11 chicken); they had to guess whether or not each was chicken. Tory got 17 of 20 right, Grant 11 of 20. After Tory noted that the texture of the meat was a major clue as to its identity, Kari ground 20 samples (12 exotic, 8 chicken) and cooked them as patties with no additional flavoring. This time, Tory and Grant scored 18 and 19, respectively, leading the Build Team to call the myth busted. However, there was one exotic meat (boar) that both Tory and Grant mistook for chicken.

=== Instant Popcorn ===
Myth statement	Status	Notes
A particular Chinese pressure vessel can be used to cook popcorn faster than any other known method.	Busted	Using his own fastest method with a foil-covered bowl over a gas burner, Alton was able to pop a batch of corn in 1 minute and 45 seconds. He, Adam, and Jamie set up the Chinese vessel to heat another batch until the interior pressure reached 1 MPa, then triggered the pressure release while wearing a bomb suit. The sudden release blew kernels all over the workshop and caused them to pop into a texture resembling puffed rice, but the overall process took 9:31.

=== Dishwasher Lasagna ===
Myth statement	Status	Notes
It is possible to cook lasagna using a dishwasher as an oven.	Confirmed	In this online exclusive, Adam, Jamie and Alton found that even though the dishwasher they had did not quite get up to Alton's preferred temperature (for food safety reasons), they were able to satisfactorily cook lasagna in a dishwasher after they used an aluminum container that was longer and wider than normal (which conducted heat better and had more surface area) and cut their ingredients thinner than usual in order to make them easier to cook. Jamie pointed out that as a wet cooking method, it made the lasagna more moist than usual, but he too found it delicious.

== Episode SP20 – "Explosions A to Z" ==
- Original US air date: November 25, 2012
- Original Australian air date: September 24, 2012

This episode was called "The A to Z of Explosions" in Australia.

The Build Team presents a series of 25 vignettes, one for each letter of the alphabet (except X and Y, which they combined), concerning the explosions that have been carried out in myth testing.

Entry	Notes
Audit; Art	Record-keeping of the 752 explosions to date on the show, tracking size, number by season, and destructive potential, as well as an explosion of paint onto a canvas
Bomb Range	A tour of the range and associated facilities, including the vehicle training area, firearms range, and safety bunker
Cement Truck	A look back at the "Cement Mix-Up" myth from 2005, leading up to the final blast that obliterated a full truck
Dynamite	Revelation that the "dynamite" used on the show is a different, safer explosive with the same energy content
Explosions	Comments from Grant and Tory on the characteristics and types of explosions, illustrated by the destruction of a china cabinet using a charge of C-4
Food Glorious Food	Remembering various explosion myths involving food. Kari noted that all food items destroyed on the show were well past their expiration date and no longer fit for human consumption.
Grenade	A look back at myths involving grenades, especially the "Red Bazooka" myth from 2011, using a rocket-propelled grenade launcher
High Speed	Reflections on the intricate detail revealed by high-speed camera footage of explosions, illustrated by blowing up a television set with C-4
Implants	The testing Adam and Jamie carried out for the "Exploding Implants" myth from 2004, and the fun they had in the process
J.D.	Explosives expert J.D. Nelson's contributions to the show, and his full-time work with the bomb squad in the Alameda County Sheriff's Department
Kitchen	Appliances and entire kitchen sets destroyed in the course of myth testing
Loud	Hearing protection used by the team and technical issues in broadcasting explosions, illustrated by measuring decibel levels of a running lawnmower and a C-4 blast
Movies	Testing of movie-based explosion myths
Nothing	The dangers that bomb technicians face in repairing/rewiring a device when it fails to explode
OSECO	Comments on this company's rupture discs, used to evaluate pressures created by an explosion
Pressure Vessel	Explosions caused by buildup of internal pressure in a container, illustrated by heating a can of shaving cream with a blowtorch until it bursts
Quagmire	Complications in tests caused by heavy rain turning the bomb range into a muddy swamp
Rockets	Mishaps that have caused rockets and rocket-propelled projectiles to explode during flight or on the launch pad. Includes comments by Grant and Tory on the reasons for the failure of the "Supersize Rocket Car" myth test from 2007.
Safety	Extensive safety precautions observed during explosion testing. In an unaired scene, Tory (dressed in a full bomb suit) carried a balloon full of flammable gas onto the bomb range, with the risk of a stray spark setting it off.
Toilet	Myths that have involved blowing up toilets by various means
Underground	Explosions of buried materials, illustrated by setting off a buried charge with a flowerpot full of dirt placed above it
Vehicle	A montage of vehicles destroyed in explosions
Water	Comments on the different behavior of explosions in water and air, illustrated by setting off a charge within a beaker of water
Xylophone	Blowing up some xylophones, and the standard yell of "Fire in the hole!" before any explosion is set off
Yelling	Blowing up some xylophones, and the standard yell of "Fire in the hole!" before any explosion is set off
Zenith	The biggest explosion to date: "Homemade Diamonds" from 2009 (5,000 lb (2,268 kg) ANFO)
