= Side grip =

Holding a handgun sideways to shoot it

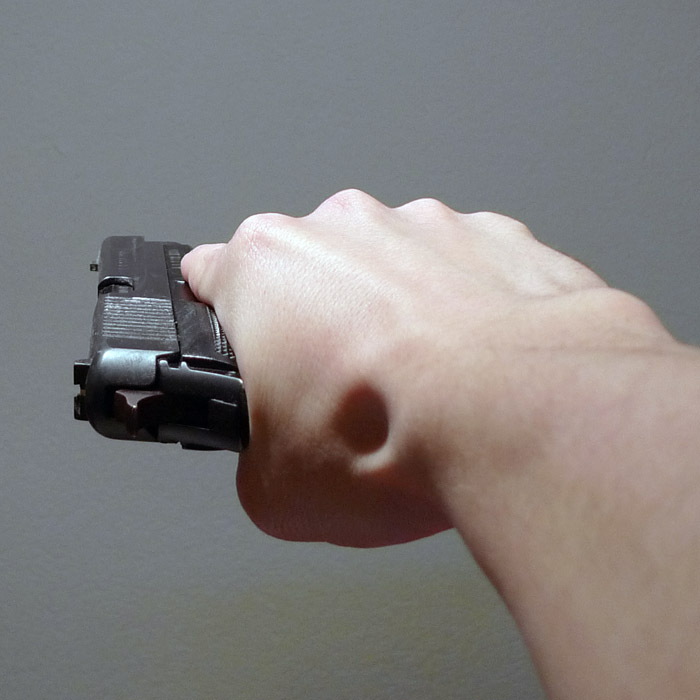
A pistol in the side grip

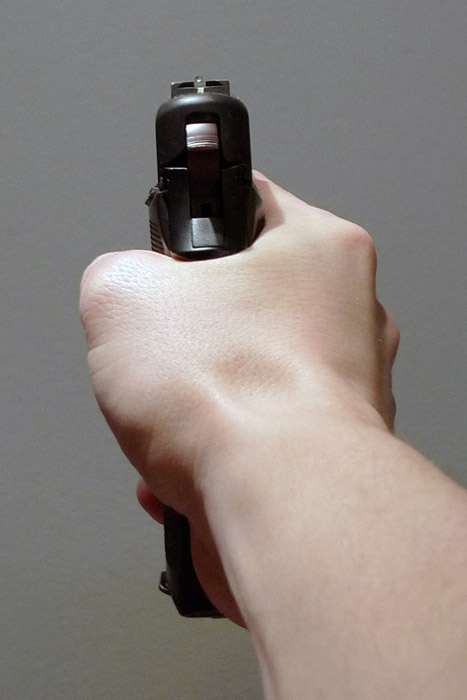
A pistol in a recommended one-handed technique

The side grip is a technique for shooting a handgun in which the weapon is rotated about ninety degrees and held horizontally instead of vertically (as is normally done). Shooting a gun in this way has no practical benefit under most circumstances and makes proper aiming very difficult, but the style has become somewhat popular in hip hop culture and among street criminals (who do not often use the gun sight) due to its portrayal in American film and television since the early 1990s.

== History ==
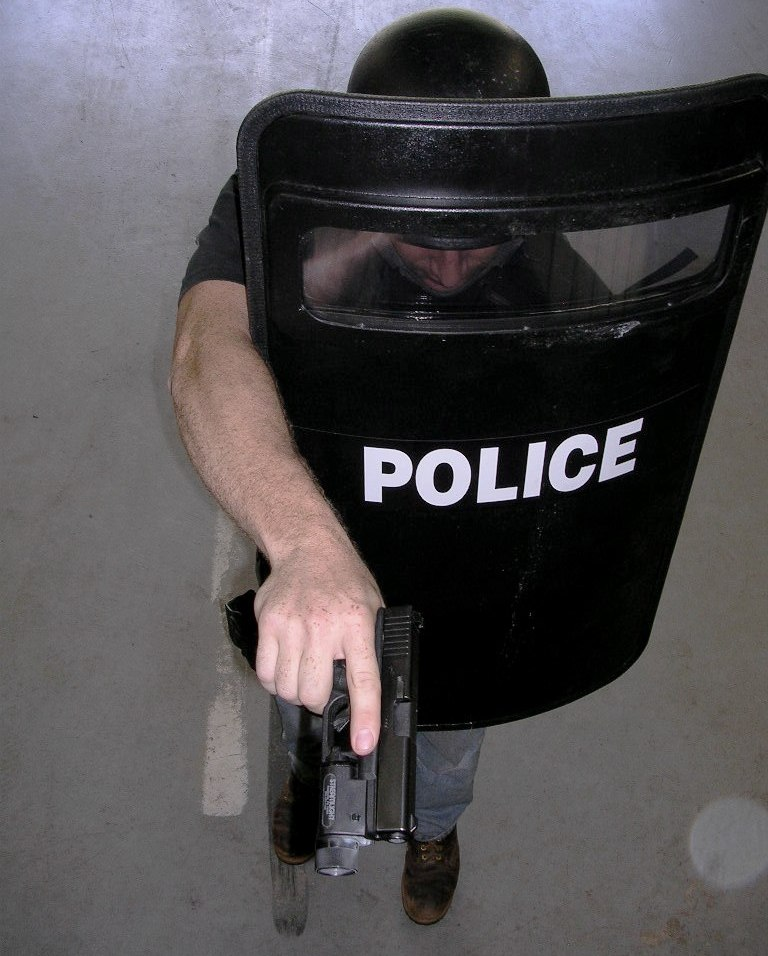
A police officer demonstrates the use of the side grip with a handgun and ballistic shield.

Holding a weapon sideways has long been equated with risky and indiscriminate shooting. For instance, in the 1894 American novel John March, Southerner, by George Washington Cable, a character orates, "No man shall come around here aiming his gun sideways; endangering the throngs of casual bystanders!"

Law enforcement officers will sometimes use the side grip to shoot while holding a riot shield or ballistic shield with their other hand. Because the shield limits the field of view, lifting and tilting the gun may make the sights more visible under these circumstances. Some shooters with issues of ocular dominance will tilt the gun at a 15- to 45-degree angle in order to take advantage of their better eye; the gun held in the left hand and the sights aligned to the right eye, for example.

Although holding a gun sideways makes it hard to control and aim, it does not, as is sometimes believed, make the weapon any more prone to jamming. Because self-loading weapons eject spent cases with a force that is much stronger than gravity, the case will not normally remain stuck in the chamber even if it is ejected upwards.

== In popular culture ==
The side grip has been portrayed in movies since at least the 1960s, notably in the westerns One-Eyed Jacks (1961) and The Good, the Bad and the Ugly (1966). The style's cinematic benefit is that it makes it easier to see both the weapon and the actor's face in a tight camera shot.

The side grip was highly popularized with the 1991 American hood film Boyz n the Hood and 1993 film, Menace II Society. In Menace II Society this technique is shown in the film's opening scene during the armed robbery of a Los Angeles, California convenience store. According to the directors, they witnessed the technique themselves in a 1987 robbery in Detroit, Michigan and used it on film because it struck them as "sloppy, edgy and realistic". Other filmmakers were fast to pick up the gesture, and it soon came to represent "arrogance and cool power" in Hollywood's visual shorthand, being used in a great number of 1990s action and gangster movies including Desperado, Payback, Seven, The Usual Suspects and Copycat. In "46 Long," the second episode of the first season of the HBO series The Sopranos, the outcome of a botched robbery is foreshadowed when one of the men recruited to help is scolded for holding his gun in a side grip.

As a result of its numerous portrayals in American film and television, the side grip is emulated in segments of American popular culture that value coolness and aggressiveness, such as hip hop music and the criminal subculture. As a result, the side grip has been increasingly used in violent armed crime in the United States. The style has become a cliché in rap culture to such an extent that a 2009 New York police statement could describe a criminal as flipping his "gun on its side like a character out of a rap video".
