= Conduit (convention) =

Fan convention in Salt Lake City, Utah, US

CONduit
- Status: on hiatus
- Genre: Science fiction/Fantasy
- Location: Salt Lake City, Utah
- Country: United States
- Inaugurated: 1990
- Most recent: 2015
- Attendance: 500-900
- Organizer: SFCon, Inc.
- Filing status: Utah non-profit
- Website: http://conduit-sf.com/

Conduit, often stylized as CONduit, was an annual general interest science fiction and fantasy convention held in May in Salt Lake City, Utah. CONduit was founded in 1989 but took two years to plan its first convention. While there are other genre conventions in Utah, CONduit was the largest general interest convention, and provided a means for professionals to meet and network with other professionals, as well as a way for fans to meet and enjoy each other's company.

CONduit had an annual charity auction to benefit a local charitable cause. This auction originally benefited Reading for the Future, a non-profit organization which promoted literacy through speculative fiction. The RFF Utah Student Writing and Art Contest was sponsored in part by CONduit. However, RFF ceased operation in January 2010. CONduit was a founding member of the Utah Speculative Fiction Council.

Notable local guests have included Brandon Sanderson, L.E. Modesitt, Jr., Tracy Hickman, Anne Wingate, Dan Willis, Bradley Williams, Eric James Stone, James Dashner, Dave Wolverton, Paul Genesse, Kevin Wasden, and Howard Tayler.

== History ==
1. CONduit, 1991. Guests: Barbara Hambly (author), Derek Hegstead (artist), Erick Wujik (gaming)
2. CONduit 2: Son of CONduit, 1992. Guests: Roger Zelazny (author), Liz Danforth (artist), Mike Stackpole (gaming)
3. CONduit 3: Bride of CONduit, 1993. Guests: Larry Niven (author), Frank & Laura Brodian Kelly Freas (artists), Cat Faber (filk)
4. CONduit 4: King CONduit, 1994. Guests: C. J. Cherryh (author), Liz Danforth (artist), Jennifer Roberson (author)
5. CONduit 5: CONduit the Barbarian, 1995. Guests: Kristine Kathryn Rusch (author), Dean Wesley Smith (authors), David Cherry (artist), ElizaBeth Gilligan (author), Katharine Kerr (author)
6. CONduit 6: Captain CONduit, 1996. Guests: Fred Saberhagen (author), Leonard Parkin (artist), L. Dean James (author)
7. CONduit 7: CONduit of the Gods, 1997. Guests: Timothy Zahn (author), Phil & Kaja Foglio (artists), Steve Jackson (gaming)
8. CONduit 8: Pirates of CONduit, 1998. Guests: David Brin (author), Arthur Roberg (artist), D. C. Fontana (media)
9. CONduit 9: Deep Space CONduit, 1999. Guests: Terry Brooks (author), Michael Goodwin (artist), Bjo & John Trimble
10. CONduit 10: Night of the Living CONduit, 2000. Guests: Charles de Lint (author), Brian Durfee (artist), MaryAnn Harris (artist), Steve Jackson (gaming)
11. CONduit 11: A Space Oddity, 2001. Guests: Alan Dean Foster (author), Larry Elmore (artist), Three Weird Sisters (filk)
12. CONduit 12: CONduit of the Rings, 2002. Guests: Christopher Stasheff (author), Newton Ewell (artist), Jack Donner (media)
13. CONduit 13: The Nightmare CONtinues, 2003. Guests: Harry Turtledove (author), Lynne Goodwin (artist)
14. CONduit 14: Reloaded, 2004. Guests: Steve Miller (author), Sharon Lee (author), Tracy & Laura Hickman (gaming), Jordin Kare (science)
15. CONduit 15: Dragons of CONduit, 2005. Guests: Tim Powers (author), Charles Vess (artist), Susan J. Napier (anime), Shannon Hale (writer to watch)
16. CONduit 16: Wizards of CONduit, 2006. Guests: L. E. Modesitt, Jr. (author), James M. Carson (conceptual artist), Sam Longoria (director, producer, actor, writer for film and theatre)
17. CONduit 17: Shadows of CONduit, May 25–27, 2007. Guests: David Weber (author), Mike Dringenberg (artist)
18. CONduit 18: Chronicles of CONduit, May 23–25, 2008. Guests: Michael A. Stackpole (author), Theresa Mather (artist)
19. CONduit 19: Evil Overlords of CONduit, May 22–24, 2009. Guests: David Farland/Dave Wolverton (author), Howard Tayler, creator of the webcomic Schlock Mercenary.
20. CONduit 20: Space Pirates of CONduit, May 28–30, 2010. Guests: Barbara Hambly (author), Kevin Wasden (artist)
21. CONduit 21: Caped CONduit, May 27–29, 2011. Guests: Carole Nelson Douglas (author), Joey Shoji (filk)
22. CONduit 22: Time Lords of CONduit, May 25–27, 2012. Guests: Tamora Pierce (author), Tim Russ (media), Mary Ellen Smith (costuming)
23. CONduit 23: The Dark Guilds of CONduit, May 24–26, 2013. Guests: Heather Joseph-Witham (author/scholar), Alexis Cruz (media), Paul Genesse (author)
24. CONduit 24: WesterCONduit, July 3–7, 2014 (held jointly with Westercon 67). Guests: Brandon Sanderson (author), Cory Doctorow (author), Howard Tayler (artist and author), Mary Robinette Kowal (author and puppeteer)
25. CONduit 25: There and Back Again, May 22–24, 2015. Guests: Jane Lindskold (author), Larry Nemecek (media/fan), Jessica Douglas (artist)
