= FRF =

FRF may refer to:

== Places ==
- Fairfield railway station (Greater Manchester), in England
- Rhein-Main Air Base (FRF is its OACI airport codename) a former United States airbase in Germany, near Frankfurt.
- ISO 3166-2:FR-F (Centre-Val de Loire)

== People ==
- Faculty research fellow

== Groups and organizations ==
- Romanian Football Federation (Romanian: Federaţia Română de Fotbal)
- Foundation for Religious Freedom, the entity controlling the New Cult Awareness Network
- Free Russia Forum, a conference of the Russian opposition

== Science and technology ==
- Francium fluoride (FrF), a hypothetical fluoride of the highly radioactive element francium
- Frequency response function
- Frequency reuse factor

== Other ==
- French franc (French: Franc Français), the currency of France in use before the Euro
- Fuji Rock Festival, in Niigata Prefecture, Japan

== See also ==
- FFR (disambiguation)
- RFF (disambiguation)
