= Oathbound =

Oathbound may refer to:

- Oathbound: Domains of the Forge
- Oathbound: Arena
- Oath Bound, a 2006 album by Summoning
- Oath-Bound, a 1922 silent film
