= Kevin Wasden =

American artist

- Wasden at CONduit 17 in Salt Lake City.
- Born: Kevin Wasden; Utah, U.S.
- Education: Utah State University; Andy Reiss
- Known for: Painting, Illustration
- Awards: Runner up in Deseret News-KSL Sterling Scholar Awards

Kevin Wasden is a science fiction and fantasy artist, illustrator, and comics artist from Utah. He has illustrated book covers, magazines, and gaming manuals. He attended Utah State University in Logan, Utah where he studied psychology before switching to art and illustration. His first major illustration job was for a professor at USU, after which he moved to New York City, where he illustrated several books and studied oil painting.

Wasden has been inspired by many artists, including Alfons Mucha, Brom, Gustav Klimt, Edgar Degas, and his favorite fantasy artist is John William Waterhouse. Wasden provided guest art for the third Schlock Mercenary collection. He is a member of the Church of Jesus Christ of Latter-day Saints.

== Works ==
In addition to his freelance illustration work, Wasden is the creator and writer of the Technosaurs web comic.

=== Little Women ===
Wasden illustrated several books by Charlotte Emerson based on Little Women by Louisa May Alcott.

- Amy's True Prize, Avon Books, ISBN 0-380-97634-X (hardcover), ISBN 0-380-79706-2 (paperback)
- Beth's Snow Dancer, Avon Books, ISBN 0-380-97632-3 (hardcover), ISBN 0-380-79704-6 (paperback)
- Jo's Troubled Heart, Avon Books, ISBN 0-380-97629-3 (hardcover), ISBN 0-380-79669-4 (paperback)
- Meg's Dearest Wish, Avon Books, ISBN 0-380-97633-1 (hardcover), ISBN 0-380-79705-4 (paperback)

=== Roleplaying books ===
Wasden has illustrated several roleplaying game reference manuals.

- Alchemy & Herbalists, by Steven Schend, Bastion Press, 2002-03-01, ISBN 0-9714392-4-9
- Oathbound: Domains of the Forge, by Greg Dent, Jim Butler, Todd Morasch, Bastion Press, 2002-09-01, ISBN 0-9714392-6-5
- Spells & Magic, by Joe Crow et al., Bastion Press, 2002-05-13, ISBN 0-9714392-5-7

=== Other works ===
- All the Dirt on Dinosaurs, by Don Lessem, Tor Kids, ISBN 0-606-25653-9 (hardcover), ISBN 0-8125-6798-6 (paperback)
- Ask Me Anything About Dinosaurs, by Louis Phillips, Avon Books, ISBN 0-380-78552-8
- Ask Me Anything About Monsters, by Louis Phillips, Avon Books, ISBN 0-380-78551-X
- Exploring Terrific Opportunities for Young Scientists: A Handbook for Teachers and Mentors of Young Scientists, by Prent Klag, Utah State University
- Grave Experiences: An Interdisciplinary Guide to Cemetery Studies, by Prent Klag, Utah State University
- Hazzardous, by Julie Wright, Covenant Communications

=== Gallery Exhibits ===
- Gallery 25 (268 Historic 25th St., Ogden, 334-9881)

=== Personal life ===
- Served a Mission for The Church of Jesus Christ of Latter-Day Saints in the Osorno Chile Mission in 1990. He married Michelle and they had a boy together on 21 Oct 1998.

== See also ==
- Friends & Familiars
