= MythBusters (2007 season) =

- No. of episodes: 25 (includes 4 specials)

Release
- Original network: Discovery Channel
- Original release: January 10 – December 12, 2007

Season chronology
- ← Previous; 2006 season Next → 2008 season

The cast of the television series MythBusters performs experiments to verify or debunk urban legends, old wives' tales, and the like. This is a list of the various myths tested on the show, as well as the results of the experiments (the myth is busted, plausible, or confirmed).

== Episode overview ==
No. overall	No. in season	Title	Original release date	Overall episode No.
70	1	"Hindenberg Mystery"	January 10, 2007	83
Myths tested: Was the Hindenburg disaster actually caused by the doping compound with which the LZ 129 Hindenburg was painted? Can running in a zigzag line save a person from a crocodile?
71	2	"Pirate Special"	January 17, 2007	84
Myths tested: Can a person jab a knife in a boat's sail, ride down the sail, and land safely on the deck? Does an eyepatch help someone see in the dark? Are the splinters made by a cannonball fired at wood more lethal than the cannonball itself? Can rum be used to clean cloth? Note: This is a special double-length episode.
72	3	"Underwater Car"	January 24, 2007	85
Myths tested: How can someone escape from a sinking car? Can paper be folded in half more than seven times?
73	4	"Speed Cameras"	March 7, 2007	86
Myths tested: Is it possible to beat a speed-tracking camera? Can a defibrillator cause nitroglycerin patches to explode?
74	5	"Dog Myths"	March 14, 2007	87
Myths tested: Is there any way to prevent a bloodhound from tracking one's scent? Is it possible to get past a guard dog? Can an old dog be taught new tricks?
75	6	"More Myths Revisited" "More Myths Reopened"	March 21, 2007	88
Myths tested: Can explosives packed in a trombone cause the slide to rocket off it? (Revisit of: The Mad Trombonist); Can a bullet travel through a sniper's scope and kill him? (Revisit of: Firearms Folklore); Can sticking one's finger in a gun barrel stop a bullet? (Revisit of: Finger in a Barrel); If two metal hammers are struck together, or a hammer strikes an anvil, can they shatter with lethal force? (Revisit of: Hammer vs. Hammer); Can a rifle fired with a boresight in the barrel backfire and explode, creating a cartoon-like banana peel effect?
76	7	"Voice Flame Extinguisher"	April 11, 2007	89
Myths tested: Can a human voice extinguish a flame? Can hypnotists plant suggestions in unwilling patients? Can hypnosis help bring back dormant memories?
77	8	"Birds in a Truck"	April 18, 2007	90
Myths tested: Do birds flying in a trailer cause the trailer to become lighter? Will a boat crashing into a channel marker cleave itself in half?
78	9	"Walking on Water"	April 25, 2007	91
Myths tested: Is it possible to walk on water? Can a speeding arrow be snatched out of the air? Can a sword be stopped with one's bare hands?
79	10	"Western Myths"	May 30, 2007	92
Myths tested: Can someone's hat be shot off? Is it possible to break someone out of jail with horses? Can an airbag turn a lock-pick into a lethal spear?
80	11	"Big Rig Myths"	June 6, 2007	93
Myths tested: Can a big rig's tire explode with deadly force? Can fuel be saved by tailgating a semi-trailer truck? Can a car be driven onto a truck's extended ramp at highway speeds?
81	12	"Grenades and Guts"	June 13, 2007	94
Myths tested: Can sacrificially jumping on a grenade save others' lives? Does self-hypnosis work? Can a combination of Diet Coke and Mentos make one's stomach explode?
82	13	"Snow Special"	June 20, 2007	95
Myths tested: Can yodeling actually set off an avalanche? Do cars have better traction on ice while driving backwards? Note: This is a special episode.
83	14	"Baseball Myths"	August 8, 2007	96
Myths tested: Can a baseball be hit hard enough to remove its covering? Can dry balls be hit farther than humid ones? Does sliding into a base get a person there faster? Can balls be hit further with a corked bat? Note: Roger Clemens was a special guest on this episode.
84	15	"Viewers' Special"	August 15, 2007	97
Myths tested: Can a person's eyes pop out while sneezing with eyes open? Can shifting to reverse stop a runaway car? Can three cigarette butts fired from a black-powder rifle kill a person at 7 ft? Note: This is a special episode.
85	16	"Red Rag to a Bull"	August 22, 2007	98
Myths tested: Are bulls really aggravated by the color red? Can ammunition stored in the oven be lethal? Can firearm cartridges thrown in a campfire kill a person? Do bulls in a china shop really cause complete destruction?
86	17	"Superhero Hour"	August 29, 2007	99
Myths tested: Is it possible to climb a building with a motorized grappling hook? Will getting punched by someone wearing a ring leave a ring-shaped imprint? Can a costume be changed in a phone booth? Is it possible to rig a grappling hook onto a car, shoot it at a steel structure, and use it to swing around a 90° corner at high speed?
87	18	"Myth Revolution"	September 5, 2007	100
Myths tested: Can the speed camera be beaten? (Revisit of: Speed Cameras); Can a ninja deflect a bullet with his palm? Can a person breathe from a car tire underwater? Will an RFID chip explode in an MRI scanner?
88	19	"Trailblazers"	October 31, 2007	101
Myths tested: Will a flaming trail of gasoline from a moving vehicle catch up to its tank and cause it to explode? Can a person outrun a trail of burning gunpowder? Can a person be burned by a defibrillator if wearing an underwire bra or a nipple ring?
89	20	"Exploding Water Heater"	November 7, 2007	102
Myths tested: Can a water heater explode like a rocket and shoot through the roof of a house? If a person is being dragged by a horse, can the friction caused by the movement make the jeans catch on fire? Can shrinking jeans by wearing them in a hot bath kill someone?
90	21	"Special Supersized Myths"	November 14, 2007	103
Myths tested: Are sharks attracted by low-frequency sound waves transmitted through water? Does the presence of dolphins deter sharks from attacking their prey? Can the jet exhaust from a Boeing 747 flip a taxi, school bus, or small plane? (Revisit of: Jet Taxi); Can a JATO rocket launch a car through the air? (Revisit of: JATO Car); Can a person waterski behind a cruise ship? Note: This is a double-length episode. Former MythBuster Scottie Chapman reappeared in this episode to assist in the testing.
91	22	"Shooting Fish in a Barrel"	November 21, 2007	104
Myths tested: Is shooting fish in a barrel really as easy as the proverb says? What is the most effective cure for pain caused by hot chili peppers? Are elephants really afraid of mice?
92	23	"Pirates 2"	November 28, 2007	105
Myths tested: Is it possible to use a rowboat as a submarine? Can one escape if buried in the sand up to the neck? What kind of projectiles would pirates use in a cannon if they run out of cannonballs? Note: This is a special episode.
93	24	"Confederate Steam Gun"	December 5, 2007	106
Myths tested: Did the Confederates really build a lethal steam-powered machine gun? Is it possible to fool a modern polygraph test?
94	25	"Airplane Hour"	December 12, 2007	107
Myths tested: Can a person with no flight training safely land a jet airliner while being assisted by the traffic controllers over the radio? If a person jumps out of an airplane with the last parachute, can another person jump out later and catch the person? Is it possible to hold a conversation while falling at terminal velocity? Does a 4,000-foot fall take 90 seconds?

== Episode 70 – "Hindenberg Mystery" ==
- Original air date: January 10, 2007

=== Hindenburg Mystery ===
Myth statement	Status	Notes
The Hindenburg was destroyed by the highly flammable doping compound used to paint it, not the hydrogen used to give it lift.	Busted	Using the same compounds used in the Hindenburg's paint, the MythBusters discovered they could combine to form highly incendiary thermite. However, the actual proportions of components in the paint burned too slowly to match the film footage of the Hindenburg disaster. A scale model of the Hindenburg using the same paint and placed in a hydrogen-rich environment took about a minute to burn and did look very similar to the original events. In the end, the MythBusters concluded the Hindenburg's demise could be attributed to both the hydrogen and the paint, and they agreed that the paint by itself was not responsible for the rapid burning of the airship. They also pointed out that if actual thermite covered the Hindenburg, it would make the airship too heavy to fly.

=== Crocodile Zig Zags ===
Myth statement	Status	Notes
A person can outrun a crocodile by running in zigzags.	Busted	The MythBusters used various methods to try to get both crocodiles and alligators to chase them using lures or openly provoking the animals. However, all of the crocodiles and alligators with which they experimented either did not react, followed them slowly, or made a single lunge. Through further study, the MythBusters concluded, because crocodiles and alligators rely on ambushing their prey, they are unlikely to engage in a prolonged chase. In addition, the MythBusters advised viewers that the best way to avoid a crocodile or alligator is to stay away from the water.

== Episode 71 – "Pirate Special" ==
- Original air date: January 17, 2007

This was a double-length episode.

=== Cannonball vs. Shrapnel ===
Myth statement	Status	Notes
The splinter fragmentation caused by a cannonball's impact with the wooden hull of a pirate ship can kill more pirates than direct impacts with the cannonball itself.	Busted	Using a simple air cannon and four pig carcasses, the MythBusters proved that a cannonball could penetrate at least four pigs with a single shot. However, when a cannonball was fired at a wooden wall, the splinters did not have enough power to pierce any of the pigs. To fully confirm or bust the myth, the MythBusters used an authentic Civil War-era cannon. Through preliminary testing, they proved the Civil War cannon was significantly more powerful than the air cannon. However, when a cannonball was fired at the wooden wall, none of the splinters managed to penetrate the pigs with enough force to be lethal. Therefore, the MythBusters concluded getting hit with a cannonball was more deadly than the splinters it creates.

=== Eye Patch ===
Myth statement	Status	Notes
Pirates wore eyepatches to preserve night vision in one eye.	Plausible	This myth works under the assumption that the eye covered with the eyepatch is already accustomed to low-light conditions, while the other eye must take time to become accustomed. The MythBusters were sent into a pirate-themed obstacle course (which was dark, and Adam and Jamie had not seen the course in light, let alone the layout) with light-accustomed eyes and were told to complete certain objectives. Their movements were hampered by the darkness, and it took them five minutes to finish, with some time penalties. When they went back in with an eye that had been covered for thirty minutes, the MythBusters were able to complete the test much more quickly and without errors. As a control test, the MythBusters then went back into the same room with light-accustomed eyes and ran into the same difficulty as in the first test. The myth was deemed plausible rather than confirmed because there are no recorded historical accounts of it.

=== Knife Sail ===
Myth statement	Status	Notes
A person can safely slow a fall by using a knife to cut a sail.	Busted	Through various small-scale tests, the MythBusters found that sails were not made in one piece but in fact had a number of seams where the sail was folded over into several layers, making them harder to cut. Also, the sharpness of the knife plays a major role in the myth. If the knife is too sharp, the pirate falls too fast. If the knife is too dull, it would be unable to cut through the seams. In the full-scale test, Tory attempted the myth himself by using a moderately sharp knife on a full-size sail. However, every time he attempted the myth, his knife would hit the seam and pop out of the sail. In the end, the MythBusters concluded there is no possible way that a pirate's knife would be able to be at the perfect balance between dullness and sharpness to safely cut through a sail.

=== Rum: Stain Remover? ===
Myth statement	Status	Notes
Pirates used rum as a means of cleaning clothes in addition to drinking it.	Busted	Using rum, modern detergent, period soap, and even urine (allowed to become stale and transform into ammonia), the MythBusters tested to see if rum could be used to clean up blood, tar, and orange stains on fabric. However, after the tests, the results were the modern detergent being best for removing tar, the urine being best for cleaning blood stains, and the rum and period soap having little effect. Also, Jamie jokingly pointed out that pirates would more likely drink the rum than use it to clean their clothes.

== Episode 72 – "Underwater Car" ==
- Original air date: January 24, 2007

=== Underwater Car ===
According to the American Automobile Association, an estimated 11,000 vehicles crashed into bodies of water in one year. The MythBusters tested various methods of escaping a sinking car—in this case, a Ford Taurus.

Myth statement	Status	Notes
If a car falls into the water and becomes submerged, the door cannot be opened until the interior is flooded.	Confirmed	The pressure differential between the outside and inside when the car is submerged is too great for a man to force the door, and the pressure must first be equalized, which means the interior must be flooded first. Adam was forced to resort to emergency air in his first test, since he expended a great deal of energy (and oxygen) in attempting to open the door. A second test later showed it to be possible to escape the car simply by opening the door, but only by remaining calm and not attempting to open the door until the interior is well and truly flooded, so as to conserve oxygen while holding one's breath.

Having confirmed the myth, Adam and Jamie expanded on the myth to determine in what situations and which methods of escaping the car are feasible.

A person can escape a car that has fallen into the water...

Myth statement	Status	Notes
...immediately after hitting the water.	Confirmed	There is not enough water pressing on the door to keep it shut. Adam escaped easily.
...as soon as the water inside the car is up to one's waist.	Confirmed	Adam barely managed to force the door open and was even briefly submerged before he emerged from the car.
...as soon as water covers the car window from the outside.	Busted	At this point, the pressure difference has become too great. Adam was unable to escape.

Adam and Jamie also proved that breaking the window is a viable way to escape a sinking car, if one has a suitable tool. Though breaking the window quickly floods the interior, Adam has to hold his breath for only a few seconds before climbing through the simulated "broken window" and surfacing. The broken window was simulated by installing a much stronger window motor, as removing broken glass from the swimming pool would have been a problem. A person can open a window in a submerged car by...

Myth statement	Status	Notes
...using a manual window crank.	Busted	Using a test weight of 350 lb (160 kg) (equivalent to pressure differential from just two feet of immersion), the pressure of the window glass against the frame is so great that no amount of effort can move the gear. It is more likely that the window handle will be broken.
...opening power windows.	Busted	Though more powerful, power windows still cannot overcome the pressure differential. Contrary to popular belief, though, power windows can withstand immersion in fresh water for prolonged periods and still function. The electricity does not short out immediately.
...attempting to break the window by using a set of keys.	Busted	Window glass is tempered and resistant to impact from blunt objects. Keys are ineffective.
...attempting to break the window by using a cell phone.	Busted	A cell phone is ineffective.
...attempting to break the window by using steel-toed boots.	Busted	Boots are ineffective.
...attempting to break the window by using a window-breaking hammer.	Confirmed	The device is designed with a pointed tip designed to shatter tempered glass. The hammer broke the window on the first try.
...attempting to break the window by using a spring-loaded center punch.	Confirmed	The point of the punch can work like the tip of the hammer, and punches are sold for the purpose of breaking window glass. The punch broke the window on the first try.

=== 7 Paper Fold ===
Myth statement	Status	Notes
A dry piece of paper cannot be folded in perpendicular halves more than seven times, regardless of its size.	Partly busted	It was impossible to fold a piece of letter-sized (8.5" × 11", 216 mm × 279 mm) 20 lb (75 g/m^{2}) copy paper with perpendicular folds more than seven times. The thickness of the paper grew geometrically with each successive fold, and after the seventh fold, the paper was just too thick to fold without breaking. Breaking the rules of the challenge, Grant showed that by folding a particularly thin sheet of paper in the same direction four times and then four times the other way, it is possible to fold the paper eight times. The Build Team then laid out a football field-sized sheet of interconnected paper (170 ft × 220 ft (52 m × 67 m)), and due to the reduction of its area-to-thickness ratio (and with help from a steam roller and a forklift), they were able to perpendicularly fold the paper 11 times. Other methods of folding a piece of paper (such as with alternating folds) proved able to break the fold threshold of seven for letter-sized paper, and perpendicular folds of more than seven are theoretically possible with thinner paper.

== Episode 73 – "Speed Cameras" ==
- Original air date: March 7, 2007

=== Speed Cameras ===
The MythBusters tested whether a speed camera...

Myth statement	Status	Notes
...cannot see through a crystallized plate cover.	Busted	The crystals inside the cover did not reflect enough light to cause overexposure and fool the camera. Also, the legality of such a device was questioned. Additionally, Adam even joked that if someone were to attempt avoiding a speed camera by using this approach, it would make him even more determined to find that person.
...cannot see through a lenticular lens plate cover.	Busted	While designed to distort the plate from an angle, all or most of the letters of the plate were still identifiable in the tests. Also, the legality of such a device was questioned.
...cannot see through plastic wrap.	Busted	The plastic wrap proved to be ineffective.
...cannot see through hairspray.	Busted	The hairspray was ineffective.
...cannot see through commercial distortion spray.	Busted	The commercial spray was ineffective.
...cannot take a picture of a car if it is going fast enough.	Busted	Neither a Dodge Neon nor a Lamborghini Murciélago was able to travel fast enough (at 138 mph (222 km/h)) to outrun the camera. However, on the series premiere of the current format of Top Gear, Richard Hammond presented a segment where his group tried to beat a British Gatso speed camera—with The Stig succeeding using a TVR Tuscan S at 170 mph (270 km/h). This myth was revisited in season 5, wherein Jamie mentioned Top Gear (though not by name, just as a "British car show") and it was explained that while speed cameras in the UK require two consecutive photographs for a conviction, US speed cameras require only one. As part of the revisit, the MythBusters were able to beat the camera by using a jet-powered car traveling at 245 mph (394 km/h).
...can take a picture of a passing bird.	Confirmed	The speed camera managed to catch a pair of trained peregrine falcons passing it at a speed of 40 mph (64 km/h).

The unofficial (Jamie Hyneman) test...

Myth statement	Status	Notes
A speed camera can be fooled if the license plate is switched while someone is driving.	Busted (unofficial)	Rigging the license plate to flip before the camera shot allowed an inaccurate display of the real plate. However, this method is illegal and would most likely net a far greater fine than the speeding ticket itself, rendering the point moot.

=== Exploding Nitro Patches ===
Nitroglycerin is useful in treating heart and blood conditions, but it is also an unstable explosive. The Build Team tested the efficacy of labels warning not to use a defibrillator before removing any nitroglycerin patches.

Myth statement	Status	Notes
Defibrillators can cause medical nitroglycerin chest patches to explode.	Busted	Using a homemade defibrillator that Grant constructed, the Build Team attempted to see whether the electric shock it created was enough to cause the nitroglycerin in the patches to explode. However, the defibrillator failed to detonate the patches, including reproductions of older-model aluminum-backed patches, as well as pure nitroglycerin dabbed directly to the body. The team was forced to use custom, high-power explosives to blow up the body.
An observer who is touching a patient who is being defibrillated can be killed from the shock.	Confirmed	In a related mini-myth scene not shown in some versions of the episode, after an oscilloscope showed that Grant's homemade defibrillator was as effective as a commercial one, the Build Team had a second ballistics gel dummy with voltage paddles in its chest touching the dummy representing the patient while the patient dummy was defibrillated. The oscilloscope reading showed a peak of 13 milliamps of current, and 6 milliamps across the heart are considered potentially lethal.

== Episode 74 – "Dog Myths" ==
- Original air date: March 14, 2007

=== Old Dogs, New Tricks ===
Following the old saying, Jamie and Adam see if they can teach an old dog new tricks.

Myth statement	Status	Notes
You cannot teach old dogs new tricks.	Busted	With the help of professional dog trainers, Adam and Jamie were both able to teach two old dogs (Bobo and Cece, a pair of seven-year-old brother and sister Alaskan Malamutes) sitting, heeling, staying, shaking hands, and lying down. However, Cece was the more obedient of the two dogs as Bobo had trouble staying.

=== Beat the Guard Dog ===
The Build Team tries to distract and get around a guard dog (in this case, a German Shepherd named Eewan) by...

Myth statement	Status	Notes
...distracting it with a steak.	Plausible	The guard dog was distracted by smelling and eating the steak long enough for Kari to reach her goal. However, once the dog was finished, it attacked the intruder.
...acting submissive.	Busted	Grant crawled on his hands and knees, but the dog attacked without hesitation.
...acting aggressive.	Busted	Tory yelled and waved his arms, but the dog attacked without hesitation.
...using the scent of a lactating dog.	Busted	The scent was sprayed on the intruder, but the dog attacked without delay.
...using the scent of wolf urine.	Plausible	Initially, the dog did not attack but instead sniffed the intruder. Eventually, it did attack before the intruder could move very far. Grant theorized that if they covered themselves in wolf urine, they may survive (if they can tolerate the smell).
...using the urine of a dog in heat.	Confirmed	The scent was put on a cloth and dragged along the ground of the fence. The dog followed and licked the scent while the intruder sneaked in, reached the goal, and returned safely.

Afterwards, the team tried to invent ways to get past Eewan.

Task	Status	Notes
Grant built a remote-controlled cat puppet to serve as a distraction.	Failed	The guard dog was initially distracted; however, because of bad controlling, the decoy and the thief crossed paths and eventually caused the guard dog to turn its attention to the intruder.
Tory crawled along the ground inside a barrel with wheels.	Failed	The dog first tried digging for the intruder, but it eventually figured out how to grab one of the wheels for leverage and get at Tory. The experiment was stopped before any risk of injury.
Kari built a human-sized hamster ball covered in plastic wrap.	Partly successful	Kari was able to roll her way to the goal and back, but she was not able to get out of the ball without the dog attacking her.

Overall, while a few methods managed to work, the guard dogs can be specifically trained to ignore certain distractions. Thus, overall, this myth was considered only plausible.

=== Foil the Bloodhound ===
The MythBusters see what it takes to shake a scent hound.

A bloodhound can be deterred by...

Myth statement	Status	Notes
...zigzagging and doubling back.	Busted	Within minutes, the dog found Adam's scent.
...running through water.	Busted	The dog found Adam, as well, and water can even help the dog find people.
...covering the floor with pepper.	Busted	The dog went to the area covered with pepper for a little while, before going back to Adam.
...cleaning old clothes and changing into new ones.	Busted	The dog found Adam, but only after being distracted by the concentrated smell where the clothes were cleaned.
...covering oneself with cologne/coffee.	Busted	Both the cologne and coffee were ineffective.
...making an urban maze with many more smells.	Plausible	Unlike in the other runs, Morgan the bloodhound was confused by the other smells around him. His trainer had to take him back to the start and try again. The dog found Adam only after 90 minutes of wandering around, and he had taken a different path than Adam did. The reason is that Morgan had not yet been trained to deal with urban tracking. However, some bloodhounds are specifically trained to work in urban environments, and the MythBusters pointed out various recorded instances of scent dogs successfully tracking targets in dense urban areas.

=== Conclusion ===
Myth statement	Status	Notes
It is difficult to work with animals.	Busted	At the end of the episode, Jamie expressed astonishment with the ability of Morgan and his trainer to work together to track down Adam, and classified the idea that you should not work with animals as "busted".

== Episode 75 – "More Myths Revisited" ==
- Original air date: March 21, 2007

This is the sixth episode in which earlier myths are retested.

=== The Mad Trombonist ===
Myth statement	Status	Notes
A trombonist had put a firecracker into his mute and, at the final note of the 1812 Overture, launched the mute, striking the conductor and knocking him back into the audience. In addition, the bell of the trombone was blown wide open and the slide was launched. (From The Mad Trombonist)	Re-busted	The retest involved placing simulated lips against the trombone's mouthpiece so as to seal that end. This still failed to cause the slide to fly off the instrument. The MythBusters achieved the feat only by soldering a plug into the mouthpiece, completely sealing it shut; the tuning slide was blown backwards out of the trombone, as well.

=== Sniper Scope ===
Myth statement	Status	Notes
A sniper can kill another sniper by shooting straight through the scope. (From Firearms Folklore)	Plausible	While Jamie used a period-correct Mosin–Nagant PU scope (which has less glass) and a .30-06 armor-piercing round, his shot went completely through the sight and penetrated two inches into the target dummy—deep enough to be a possibly lethal hit. Shots with standard ball ammunition produced less successful results.

=== Finger in a Barrel ===
Myth statement	Status	Notes
A shotgun plugged by a human finger will backfire and explode, injuring or killing the shooter instead of the intended victim. (From Finger in a Barrel)	Re-busted	The retest used a 19th-century double-barreled shotgun made through Damascus welding. The first barrel was damaged by a ballistic gelatin finger, though not as seen in cartoons. A steel finger welded to the end of the second barrel simply made the whole tip of the barrel shoot off.
A .30-06 rifle fired while having a boresight still in the barrel will backfire and explode, creating a cartoon-like banana peel effect as shown in submitted photographs. (Spinoff of Finger in a Barrel)	Plausible	The Build Team's test used a brand-new rifle. The barrel split several inches when fired with a laser boresight in the barrel. The Build Team surmised that the banana peel effect could be achieved if this were to happen in an older rifle that has endured more wear and tear from firings.

=== Hammer vs. Hammer ===
Myth statement	Status	Notes
If two hammers strike each other, at least one hammer will completely shatter with lethal force. (From Hammer vs. Hammer)	Re-busted	First, the Build Team properly heated two modern hammers to the transition point and quenched them, making them as brittle as possible. The two hammers simply snapped at the necks when struck. They then tested older steel hammers (predating World War II). Though the heads began to chip when struck, one of them ultimately snapped at the neck, as well.
If a hammer strikes hard against an anvil, the hammer will completely shatter with lethal force. (From Hammer vs. Hammer)	Re-busted	For this retest, they used a genuine steel anvil and used a rig that would make the hammer strike against the top of the anvil. The pre-WWII steel hammer suffered cracks and chips from first a human-strength and then a superhuman strike, but it did not shatter.

== Episode 76 – "Voice Flame Extinguisher" ==
- Original air date: April 11, 2007

=== Voice Fire-Extinguisher ===
Myth statement	Status	Notes
An unamplified human voice can put out a fire.	Busted	It proved to be impossible for an unamplified voice to extinguish a candle; however, a singer in a local group was able to put the candle out through amplification.
Sound alone can put out a fire.	Confirmed	A pure, amplified tone was able to put out a well-sized fire. This can be done because the pressure waves from the sound disrupt the air enough to snuff out the flame. Also, using a high-explosive bomb can put out flames since the blast wave pushes away the oxygen that fuels the fire, or the explosives use up so much oxygen so quickly, the fire cannot sustain itself. Oil well firefighters commonly use explosives to put out oil well fires.

=== Hypnosis Myths ===
Myth statement	Status	Notes
Using hypnosis can make one go against one's will.	Busted	While hypnotized, Grant was told to do certain uncharacteristic actions through hypnotic suggestion, and he would perform these actions after a specific trigger. However, the triggers did not work (possibly because Grant knew he was being given a trigger, even if he did not know what it was), so the test was performed again on a producer who believed in hypnosis (this time trying to slip the triggers in during an otherwise clandestine hypnosis session). However, this test also failed. In addition, many experts and hypnotists agree that hypnotic suggestion will never work if the suggestion conflicts with the subject's moral fiber. This verdict is in contrast to an earlier myth on hypnosis as a form of remote mind control.
Using hypnosis can make one remember things more clearly.	Confirmed	The Build Team was given a short play (involving Jamie and local actors playing deliverymen) and was later quizzed about minor events, in which they failed miserably. Taking the same tests under hypnosis, they remembered tiny facts such as nametags and tattoos and achieved a better score.

== Episode 77 – "Birds in a Truck" ==
- Original air date: April 18, 2007

=== Birds in a Truck ===
Myth statement	Status	Notes
Birds flying around inside a truck will actually make the truck lighter.	Busted	Adam and Jamie constructed a large box, placed it on top of a scale, and then filled it with captured pigeons. Then, the MythBusters activated a special contraption that would force the pigeons to fly into the air, but they could not detect any discernible difference in the weight of the box. They then placed a model helicopter inside the box and had it hover above the ground, but this method also failed to produce any results. The MythBusters theorized that the air being displaced by the birds' wings and the helicopter rotors was pressing down the box, which is why there was no change in the overall weight. All was in compliance with Newton's third law of motion.

=== Bifurcated Boat ===
Myth statement	Status	Notes
A boat moving at 25 mph (40 km/h) can be split down the middle by hitting a channel marker.	Busted	Through small-scale tests, the team noticed that whenever they tried to have their model boat hit the channel marker dead on, the boat would just glance off with minimal damage. Tory then tried having the boat turn into the marker at the last second, which produced more positive results. Moving on to full scale, the team acquired a used boat (dubbed the Mythity Split) and had it crash into a specially constructed channel marker. The Mythity Split struck the marker, but it only suffered minimal damage rather than splitting. The Build Team then tried moving the boat at faster speeds but still could not split the boat. (The team did acknowledge the split would be possible at a very fast speed but not the mythical 25 mph.) Wanting the boat to be completely destroyed, the Build Team opted to drop it from a crane, effectively busting the myth in the process (and damaging the crane when the boat toppled over onto it).

== Episode 78 – "Walking on Water" ==
- Original air date: April 25, 2007

The MythBusters test various ninja-related myths.

=== Walking on Water ===
Myth statement	Status	Notes
Ninjas had the ability to run across water.	Busted	To test this myth, Adam tried various special shoe designs, including mizu gumo, which were meant to increase his surface area on the water or increase his buoyancy. However, the shoes either failed to keep Adam afloat or were impossible to control as he tried to cross the body of water. Jamie then created a non-Newtonian fluid from a mixture of water and corn starch, which made the water solid enough for Adam to run across unaided. However, ninjas unlikely had access to large amounts of corn starch (if any at all), so the myth was busted.

=== Catching an Arrow ===
Myth statement	Status	Notes
Ninjas can catch arrows in midair.	Busted	To start off, Jamie fired arrows blunted with tennis balls, while Adam tried to catch them. Though it took several tries, Adam did manage to catch the arrows flying through the air. However, these arrows were moving at only a third of the speed of a normal arrow. To test a full-speed arrow, Adam and Jamie built an artificial hand that could close with both human and superhuman speed. The artificial hand managed to catch the arrow easily in superhuman speed, but the human strength setting was just not powerful enough to grip the arrow in time.

=== Catching a Sword ===
Myth statement	Status	Notes
Ninjas can catch a sword in between their bare palms.	Busted	To test this myth, the Build Team constructed a machine to swing a sword, as well as a pair of artificial hands, to try to catch it. However, during their tests, the hands were simply not fast enough to catch the sword, plus they suffered damage as they attempted to stop the blade. When they consulted an expert, he pointed out that it would be more prudent to either block or dodge the sword rather than trying to catch it with one's bare palms. He did show that with the use of ninja Shuko climbing claws, he could easily block a sword with a single hand.

== Episode 79 – "Western Myths" ==
- Original air date: May 30, 2007

=== Shooting a Hat ===
Myth statement	Status	Notes
A cowboy can shoot a hat off a person's head, sending the hat flying through the air without harming the wearer.	Busted	Using an arsenal of period weapons, cowboy hats, and a dummy head, Adam and Jamie were unable to get the hat to fall off the dummy's head, much less fly. The bullets simply could not transfer enough force into the hat to make it fly off. While pistols and rifles were ineffective, the MythBusters found that shotgun shells could make a hat fly into the air since the birdshot provided greater surface area to transfer the force of the shell. However, the birdshot also peppered the dummy in a fashion that would be fatal to a human being.

=== Lockpick of Death ===
Myth statement	Status	Notes
A thief attempted to pick the lock of a car and accidentally tripped the side airbag, launching the lockpick with enough force to skewer his skull.	Busted	The Build Team constructed a robotic arm to simulate a person attempting to pick the lock of a car. They then placed a ballistics gel head over the arm to simulate a human head. However, they were unable to trigger the side airbag with the lockpick (the mechanic present explained that the airbag was not inside the door but in the car and attached to the inside of the door). The team then built a robotic leg, under the assumption that if the thief were unable to break into the car, he would kick the car in frustration and trigger the side airbag. Neither a human nor a superhuman strength kick could trigger the airbag. Plus, the airbag is placed in a way that it would never be pointing towards the lockpick, meaning it could never be launched. To replicate the results, the Build Team encased the lockpick in a sabot and placed it inside an air cannon. The lockpick, fired from the cannon, was able to skewer the skull. However, no clear evidence suggested the myth was in any way true.

=== Old Western Jailbreak ===
Myth statement	Status	Notes
A horse can be used to pull the bars out of a prison window and help free the occupant inside.	Busted	After some research, Adam and Jamie built a replica of a period prison cell (based on one in Fort Dodge, Kansas, built out of railroad ties), complete with a barred window. However, when they tied a horse to the bars and attempted the pull them out, the bars did not budge. Two horses could not pull out the bars, and neither could a motorized cart that was twice as strong as both horses combined. As a last-ditch attempt, the MythBusters tried pulling the bars out using a 30,000-pound (14,000 kg) crane. However, the steel beams bracing the wall failed before the prison bars did. Since not even a modern vehicle could pull the bars out of the window, it is unlikely that any number of horses could.
A prisoner can be freed from an Old West jail cell with a single stick of dynamite.	Busted	The MythBusters placed a single stick of dynamite on the cell window and detonated it, with Buster inside to test whether the occupant would survive. While the dynamite did not cause any significant damage to the wall, it did loosen the bars enough for Adam to pull them out and escape. However, the blast set off all of the shock indicators placed on Buster, indicating that although a single stick of exploding dynamite would allow him to escape, the shock of the blast would kill him first, busting the myth. Jamie remarked that an axe could achieve the same amount of damage the dynamite caused, with significantly less noise.

=== Lone Ranger's Silver Bullets ===
Myth statement	Status	Notes
The silver bullets used by the Lone Ranger are more effective than standard lead bullets.	Busted	This myth is seen on Discovery's website, and it was part of Adam's own curiosity of why the Lone Ranger used silver bullets instead of normal lead ones. As a test, he hand-crafted a silver bullet and fired both it and a lead bullet into ballistic gel. The lead bullet penetrated farther than the silver bullet due to its greater density and mass, thus it is more effective in bringing down an opponent. Also, silver shrinks when cooled, forcing precision accuracy when forging bullets out of it, and was used as a form of currency back in the Wild West, which would make using silver bullets impractical and a waste of good money.

== Episode 80 – "Big Rig Myths" ==
- Original air date: June 6, 2007

This was the first episode in which all myths shown on television (excluding the special website-only myth, which was plausible) were confirmed.

=== Exploding Tire of Death ===
Myth statement	Status	Notes
A tire on a big rig can explode with lethal force.	Confirmed	The MythBusters first tested whether a big rig tire could actually explode. They managed to obtain several truck tires and subjected them to actual road conditions to try to replicate certain circumstances that could cause a tire to explode. Although they could not make a tire fail catastrophically, they managed to cause it to disintegrate violently by running the tire flat at highway speed, though the flying debris failed to hit the dummy set up next to the tire. However, the MythBusters were able to measure the velocity of the debris. Taking an actual piece of the exploded tire, the MythBusters launched it at its measured initial velocity into a pig spine-equipped ballistics gel dummy behind a car window. The piece of debris smashed through the window and decapitated the dummy, proving the myth was true.

=== Drafting for Money ===
Myth statement	Status	Notes
Drafting, or slipstreaming, behind a big rig will improve a car's fuel efficiency.	Confirmed	To test this myth, the Build Team procured a car, a big rig, and a device that could measure a car's fuel efficiency. They then drove the car behind a moving big rig at various distances ranging from 100 to 2 ft (30.48 to 0.61 m) and measured the amount of fuel the car consumed. They discovered the closer the car was to the big rig, the less drag was produced, thus the more fuel saved. At just 10 ft (3.0 m), the car managed to increase its fuel efficiency by 40%. Drafting at 2 ft (0.61 m) was slightly lower than the ten-foot distance, mainly because Grant had to keep working the car pedal to maintain distance from the truck. However, they did not dispute the fact that drafting actually can increase a car's fuel efficiency if a constant velocity is kept. However, the Build Team has warned that drafting is incredibly dangerous because the truck driver may not be able to see cars that close, and the driver of the car may not be able to react in time if the truck were to make a sudden stop (they noted that at two feet, a person has less time to act than it takes to blink).

Scale wind tunnel test: drag reduction from baseline at 50 mph (80 km/h): seven car lengths / 10 ft (3 m) / 6 ft (2 m) / 2 ft (1 m); 21% / 60% / 80% / 93%	Controlled road test: fuel consumption decrease from baseline at 55 mph (89 km/h): 100 ft (30 m) / 50 ft (15 m) / 20 ft (6 m) / 10 ft (3 m) / 2 ft (1 m); 11% / 20% / 27% / 39% / 28%

=== Knight Rider Ramp ===
Myth statement	Status	Notes
As seen in the TV series Knight Rider, a moving car can safely transition from a road into a moving big rig by ramp.	Confirmed	To test this myth, the MythBusters started with a small-scale test using a toy car. Simulating the Knight Rider stunt, the MythBusters found the toy car could enter the big rig safely without a sudden and dangerous acceleration that many people had feared. They then tested the stunt at full scale using a Chevy Camaro, which is similar to a Pontiac Trans Am like the one used in Knight Rider. They tested at both 30 mph (48 km/h) and 55 mph (89 km/h) with no difficulty. The MythBusters explained, even when hitting the truck's ramp, the car's inertia keeps it going at exactly the same speed relative to the ground—which lets it safely drive into the big rig, with no surprising accelerations. Jamie then reinforced the concept by safely exiting the moving semi truck in reverse.

=== Cyclists Drafting a Big Rig ===
Myth statement	Status	Notes
Cyclists can draft behind a big rig and achieve "crazy speeds".	Plausible	This myth is seen on the Discovery Channel's website. The Build Team decided to test whether a cyclist would have an easier time riding if he were to draft a big rig. Tory was chosen as the cyclist and performed a control test by cycling up to 20 miles per hour unaided. To ensure accuracy, Grant kept track of Tory's heart rate and Kari measured his speed with radar. By the end of the control run, Tory was exhausted by the effort. During the actual test, however, Tory literally coasted along behind the big rig and rarely had to pedal at all. Due to the obvious difference in performance and the fact that professional cyclists draft behind each other during competitions, the myth was plausible but unsafe. This test was finally aired in the 2011 "Planes, Trains, and Automobiles" special.

== Episode 81 – "Grenades and Guts" ==
- Original air date: June 13, 2007

=== Self Hypnosis ===
The Build Team tested whether self-hypnosis could...

Myth statement	Status	Notes
...cure seasickness.	Busted	Grant, who is susceptible to seasickness, volunteered to test self-hypnosis to see whether he could overcome his condition. As a control, he was put into a chair that helped induce seasickness while Tory and Kari kept track of how long it would take for him to vomit. Grant then used a self-hypnosis CD to try to cure his sickness. After his self-hypnosis session, Grant went back to the chair, but he still succumbed to his sickness, although it took twice as long.
...change eye color.	Busted	Kari first went to an eye center to obtain a control photo of her eye color (brown). She then underwent a self-hypnosis session in an attempt to change her physical eye color. However, when she went back to the eye center to have her eyes analyzed, the results showed no change in eye color.
...eliminate a person's fear of bees.	Busted	Because Tory had no real issues that could be resolved through self-hypnosis, the Build Team instead brought Adam and tried to cure him of his irrational fear of bees. For the control test, they measured Adam's heart rate and physical stress levels when he was shown a box full of bees and had to put his hand inside it. After going through his self-hypnosis session, Adam retook the test. During the retest, he showed the same amounts of fear and physical stress as in the control test, showing he still possessed his fear.

Though the Build Team tested self-hypnosis only in several specific cases, because of the results, they deemed that the overall myth of self-hypnosis was busted.

=== Diet Coke & Mentos II: Exploding Stomach ===
Myth statement	Status	Notes
If a person swallowed both Mentos and Diet Coke, their stomach would explode.	Busted	This myth is based on an internet video where a man ingested both Diet Coke and Mentos and fell unconscious, reportedly from a ruptured stomach. When this myth was tested with a pig's stomach, it was learned that the simple act of drinking the soda released much of the carbon dioxide within it, preventing the expected cascade of foam the Mentos and soda combination would give off. Even pumping the gas from the normal Mentos/cola fountain directly into the stomach did not make the stomach burst, but like in the previous myth of soda and Pop Rocks, the stomach expanded to the point where the victim would be in a lot of pain and induced vomiting. Only by blowing compressed air directly into the stomach did it burst.

=== Hand Grenade Hero ===
This myth was based on various Hollywood depictions of how heroes would dispose of triggered grenades to save their comrades. The MythBusters tested whether a hero could save his buddies by...

Myth statement	Status	Notes
...covering the grenade with his own body.	Confirmed	During the control test, the MythBusters detonated a grenade with no obstacles with several plywood dummies around it at varying distances. The shrapnel inflicted lethal injuries on most of the dummies. For the actual test, the MythBusters planted a ballistics gel dummy over the grenade before detonating it. While the ballistics gel dummy was completely destroyed, only one of the plywood dummies suffered any severe damage, and the damage caused was not lethal. While the hero would undoubtedly die in the attempt, he would be able to save his comrades nearby, as also described in dozens of Medal of Honor citations.
...placing the grenade in a bucket full of water.	Confirmed	The MythBusters placed a grenade in a bucket full of water, in hopes that the bucket would slow down the shrapnel enough to inflict no harm on the plywood dummies. However, there were fears that the bucket would in fact contribute to the damage by being turned into shrapnel itself. After the test, only one of the dummies suffered lethal damage, but still significantly less shrapnel damage occurred than in the control test. Though they found this method to be less effective than the previous one in terms of injuries prevented, it has the advantage that the hero does not have to sacrifice himself.
...throwing the grenade inside a refrigerator. This particular myth was based on a scene in the Monk episode "Mr. Monk and the Election".	Busted	The MythBusters obtained a refrigerator and placed it in the middle of a group of the dummies. They then placed a grenade inside it and detonated it. The refrigerator was literally turned into a giant fragmentation grenade as also happened in the original episode. Unlike in the episode, however, where the fridge absorbed the explosive force enough to leave bystanders unharmed, the flying debris from the MythBusters' test destroyed the dummies immediately in front of and behind the refrigerator, though standing to the sides seemed safe. The MythBusters agreed that putting a grenade in the refrigerator was not a good idea.

Before the above experiments, Adam tested a mini myth:

Myth statement	Status	Notes
It is possible to pull the pin out of a grenade by using one's teeth.	Busted	Adam tried it and failed. It takes 10 lbf (44 N) to pull the pin by hand, enough force to either break or uproot teeth.

== Episode 82 – "Snow Special" ==
- Original air date: June 20, 2007

The following myths state that an avalanche can be caused by...

Myth statement	Status	Notes
...yodeling.	Busted	While the small-scale experiments indicated that, aimed at the right place, an amplified voice can set off an avalanche, in the final test, no amount of yodeling by a professional yodeler could elicit a response. The yodeler was provided with a megaphone, but again, no avalanche took place.
...a whip crack.	Busted	Adam theorized that the miniature sonic boom caused by the cracking of a whip could trigger an avalanche, but no avalanche took place.
...submachine gun fire.	Busted	This myth was started with stories of World War I soldiers setting off avalanches in heavily snowed-in areas with their artillery, thus using them as environmental weapons. Adam and Jamie attempted to test if lower-powered weapons, such as machine guns, could also cause an avalanche. They tested this with a pair of MP5s, though they could not cause an avalanche to start.

Despite the "busted" designation, Jamie emphasized that avalanches are "finicky beasts" and cases of skiers unintentionally setting them off have been noted. Therefore, it is impossible to tell exactly what will trigger an avalanche.

=== Frozen Tongue ===
Myth statement	Status	Notes
A person's tongue can instantly stick to a freezing (below 32 °F) metal pole when touched, making it difficult to remove.	Confirmed	This is the classic "triple dog dare" stunt (from A Christmas Story). Using both Tory's tongue and a pig's, a standard human tongue can be frozen to a cold metal pole substantially enough to risk pulling some of the skin and muscle off the tongue. Kari jokingly suggested that a person could free himself by urinating on the contact point between the pole and the tongue.

=== Driving on Ice ===
Myth statement	Status	Notes
Driving backwards on an icy road will give the car better traction than driving forwards.	Busted	While drivers were found to get better traction on an icy road while driving in reverse, when put into practice, the increased traction did not offset the sheer difficulty of driving in reverse. The Build Team theorized that because driving backwards is so difficult by itself, the ice compounded that difficulty, rendering any additional traction useless.

== Episode 83 – "Baseball Myths" ==
- Original air date: August 8, 2007

This episode featured Roger Clemens as a guest star in a short segment explaining the physics behind different pitches.

=== Corked Bat ===
Myth statement	Status	Notes
A baseball bat filled with cork can hit a baseball farther than a normal bat.	Busted	This myth operates under the assumption that cork-filled bats can be swung faster because of their lighter weight and that the springiness of the cork could propel the ball farther. To eliminate the human factor of the myth, Adam and Jamie constructed a special batting rig and used a pressurized air cannon to launch the baseball at it. Tests showed that the cannon could launch the ball 80 miles per hour. Regulation bats could propel the ball away at 80 mph (130 km/h) while corked bats could propel the ball only 40 mph (64 km/h), half the speed of regulation bats. The reason was that corked bats have less mass to transfer force into the ball, and the cork actually absorbs some of the ball's impact. The MythBusters concluded that using a corked bat will not improve performance (it will in fact hurt it), and the major league batters who were caught using corked bats risked their careers for absolutely nothing.

=== Humid Balls ===
Myth statement	Status	Notes
A dry baseball can be hit farther than a ball stored in a humid environment, which is why baseball teams that store their balls in humid environments suffer from lower home run averages.	Plausible	The Build Team started off with a small-scale test by dropping dry and humid balls from a certain height. The results showed that the dry balls tended to bounce higher than the humid balls. For the full-scale test, Grant built his own rig (dubbed "The Mad Batter") that could both swing the bat and pitch the ball at the same time. The Build Team then tested the rig at a baseball field using humid balls, dry balls, and control balls stored in a normal environment. The results showed definitively that the dry balls were hit the farthest distance and the humid balls were hit the least distance. The Build Team agreed that outside forces may be at work, but the data supported the myth enough to be considered plausible.

=== Rising Fastball ===
Myth statement	Status	Notes
A fastball (pitched overhand) can lift itself higher into the air.	Busted	Despite the testimony of some pitchers, even going as fast as the fastest pitch ever recorded, a baseball cannot generate an aerodynamic lift force greater than its own weight. The maximum force a fastball can exert is only half of its weight, making a rising fastball impossible. When compared to a "non-rising" fastball, the baseball does not drop as much as it normally would, giving it the optical illusion of appearing to have risen.

=== The Slide ===
Myth statement	Status	Notes
On bases that a player cannot overrun, it is faster to slide into them.	Confirmed	While this is a popular tactic used by baseball players, some speculate that sliding will actually slow a person down due to the friction being exerted between their bodies and the ground. With some coaching, the Build Team learned how to slide like baseball players. They then timed how long it would take to run to a base and slide to a base. The results showed that the entire team—Tory, Jamie, and Grant—reached the base faster by sliding than by running, by a fraction of a second, supporting the explanation that as they ran, Tory, Jamie, and Grant had to slow down at the last second so their momentum would not carry them past the base. With such definitive results, the MythBusters agreed that sliding to a base is faster than running. Ed Sprague Jr., then head coach of the baseball team called the Pacific Tigers, appears as a guest, coaching the group in sliding technique.

=== Hitting the Hide Off a Ball ===
Myth statement	Status	Notes
A baseball's stitches can tear and the hide of the baseball will fall off if the baseball is thrown fast enough and hit hard enough.	Busted	The MythBusters modified their corked bat rig to fire the baseball at much higher speeds. It fired the ball at a static bat with speeds over 200 mph (320 km/h), which is almost twice as fast as the fastest pitch ever recorded, which broke the bat. However, the ball remained intact. The MythBusters then fired the cannon at maximum power. The hide of the ball did come off, but the ball was fired at a metal pole (which is much harder than wood) at 437 mph (703 km/h), four times faster than, and with 17 times the energy, any human could pitch.

== Episode 84 – "Viewers' Special" ==
- Original air date: August 15, 2007

Viewers picked myths they thought needed to be tested, and the MythBusters picked the best to test.

=== Eye-Popping Sneeze ===
Myth statement	Status	Notes
If a person sneezes with his or her eyes open, his or her eyes will fly out from the force.	Busted	It was hard for Adam and Jamie to sneeze with their eyes open, but Adam eventually did the trick by forcing his eyelids open with his fingers. His eyes were fully intact. It would be impossible for a person's eyes to pop out because of the number of natural attachments that keep the eyes inside the sockets.

=== Stopping a Car in Reverse ===
Myth statement	Status	Notes
A runaway car can be stopped by shifting the gears into reverse.	Busted	The MythBusters tested this myth with both an automatic and a manual car. Both cars were given the full force of the brake and stopped after 65 and 80 ft (20 and 24 m), respectively. Shifting into reverse did just about nothing, and both cars stopped after over 1,000 ft (300 m). The automatic car had a fail safe to prevent it from going into reverse while traveling forward, while the manual car could engage reverse gear only if it was stationary. The MythBusters also tested if an automatic car in park would have stopped it; it did not. Additionally, shifting into reverse or park at high speeds can damage the transmission of the car.

=== Killer Butts ===
Myth statement	Status	Notes
Cigarette butts fired out of a gun can hit with lethal force.	Confirmed	The MythBusters first fired cut-off cigarette ends, but none of them penetrated the ballistics gel mold, let alone into the heart. Only after they fired at point-blank range and fired cigarette butts from used cigarettes, full of cigarette waste material, thus adding mass, was the heart damaged.

=== Car Remote Capers ===
Myth statement	Status	Notes
By cutting a hole in a tennis ball, one can squeeze the ball and the resulting air pressure can unlock a car door.	Busted	The Build Team replicated an online viral video with two different tennis balls with two sized holes, but the car door did not unlock. They blasted the lock with full air pressure, but it still did not do anything. They finally recreated the events in the video by having Tory unlock the door remotely in the background, and were quick to point out that clever editing can make things look real.

=== Car Explosion ===
Myth statement	Status	Notes
A "Hollywood explosion" will blow up a car.	No result	Adam and Jamie got a request from Chris, a 12-year-old fan, to blow up his parents' car (he had his parents' permission, and the car looked old to viewers). The "Hollywood explosion" partly blew up the car. A real explosion blew up the car, and a part of the car landed in a tree.

=== Stopping a Blade ===
This was an online-only special. The Build Team also tested if one could prevent an opponent's sword from piercing the chest with...

Myth statement	Status	Notes
...a hardcover Bible.	Confirmed	The team did not use a Bible for religious reasons, so a hardcover book (the pocket reference of the MythBusters with similar properties to a Bible) was used, and it was able to prevent a sword being thrust at human strength and speed from piercing the pig's flesh.
...a bunch of coins.	Busted	The coins merely deflected the blow to another part of the body.
...dollar bills.	Confirmed	The blade could not penetrate more than 53 bills.

== Episode 85 – "Red Rag to a Bull" ==
- Original air date: August 22, 2007

=== Hot Bullets ===
Jamie and Adam investigated myths inspired by reports of gun owners attempting to use their ovens to store guns and ammunition since a proper gun cabinet is not available—and then running into trouble if they forgot to remove the guns and ammo before using the oven.

Myth statement	Status	Notes
An oven door can stop bullets.	Busted	The oven door failed to stop .38-caliber rounds, .357-magnum rounds, and shotgun shells. The only exception was the .22-caliber pistol rounds were unable to pierce the steel part of the oven door.
Cartridges can explode with lethal force if they are stored inside a hot oven.	Busted	.22-, .44-, and .50-caliber cartridges were placed inside an oven. All of the cartridges exploded once the oven was hot enough, but none of them were able to penetrate the oven. Without a gun barrel to contain and direct the propellant gases, the bullets did not develop enough speed to pierce the glass or steel portions of the oven. The cartridge casings actually caused more damage than the bullets.
A gun can fire a bullet with lethal force if stored inside a hot oven.	Confirmed	For the absolute worst-case scenario, Adam and Jamie placed a loaded .38-caliber revolver inside a hot oven pointing towards the oven door. Once the temperature was high enough, the gun spontaneously discharged and sent the bullet out of the oven and deep into a calibrated plywood/soundboard backstop, meaning it could possibly kill anybody who happened to be standing in front of the oven.
Cartridges thrown into an open fire can explode with lethal force.	Busted	Using a robot, Jamie dropped a box of cartridges with varying calibers directly onto a campfire. While many of them immediately discharged, it appeared that none of the bullets could be lethal. Like in the oven test, most of the damage was being dealt by the cartridge casings, which could not travel fast enough to be lethal. However, Adam and Jamie determined the bullets could cause many non-lethal injuries.

=== Campfire Chaos ===
While their fire that they used to test bullets on an open fire was still going, Adam and Jamie took the opportunity to test the danger and lethality of other containers or pressure vessels when placed into a fire.

Myth statement	Status	Notes
Aerosol cans placed in an open fire can explode with lethal force.	Busted	While the aerosol cans exploded rather violently, the worst damage they could do was cause burns. Adam also joked that it would be another way that one could lose an eyebrow as he famously did in "Cell Phone Destroys Gas Station".
A beer keg can explode with lethal force if placed in an open fire.	Plausible	Getting the keg into the fire proved to be difficult at first as the full keg was too heavy. Adam figured that once the keg was light enough (and everyone in the party was drunk enough), the keg could be tossed in. While the beer keg exploded violently, there was no shrapnel from the explosion. However, the MythBusters pointed out that any shrapnel thrown from such a powerful blast could kill a person. Jamie also joked that it would be a waste of beer.
A fire extinguisher will explode with lethal force if placed in a fire. This myth is shown only on the Discovery website.	Busted	Though fire extinguishers are capable of killing a person if the cylinder is punctured, they will not explode when put in a fire due to a built-in safety feature. Newer extinguishers have a release valve, which blows out if the cylinder's pressure limit is exceeded. After a while in the fire, the release valve was triggered by increased pressure and the carbon dioxide was released safely.

=== Red Rag to a Bull ===
Myth statement	Status	Notes
The color red can infuriate a bull and make it charge.	Busted	To test this myth without putting themselves in danger, the Build Team constructed three fake matadors that would carry differently colored flags. First, they placed stationary flags of different colors near a bull. The bull charged the red, white, and blue flags with equal ferocity, even when all three flags were out at once. Using a remote-controlled clothesline, the Build Team managed to prove the bulls were angered by movement rather than color. They then placed the matador dummies in the ring, each one dressed in a different color. The bull charged the white dummy first, the blue dummy second, and the red dummy last. Finally, Tory went into the ring while dressed in a red jumpsuit and had to stay still while two professional cowboys moved around the ring to try to draw the bull's attention. The bull chased the cowboys for a short time but ignored Tory, which proved the theory that bulls concentrated on movement more than color. The Build Team also busted a corresponding misconception that bulls are colorblind. Recent research in the past 15 years (of this taping) had revealed that bulls (and other cloven-hooved animals) are capable of seeing color; however, the capability is limited to hues of only red and blue, both of which were coincidentally used in the test.

=== Bull in a China Shop ===
Myth statement	Status	Notes
The idiom "bull in a china shop" is accurate.	Busted	The Build Team placed shelves full of china inside a bull pen and released bulls inside it. Surprisingly, the bulls went out of their way to avoid the shelves, even when multiple bulls were inside the pen at the same time. A single shelf was knocked over by accident by the first bull released in the pen, and a few dishes were knocked to the ground when as many as four bulls were running around, but overall, the bulls proved surprisingly nimble. A representative from the National Rodeo Association later corroborated the results, explaining that bulls seldom move when placed in tight confinement such as pens and trailers.

== Episode 86 – "Superhero Hour" ==
- Original air date: August 29, 2007

=== Grappling Hook ===
Myth statement	Status	Notes
Superheroes can use grappling hooks to quickly scale walls.	Grappling gun: busted; handheld winch: plausible	To begin, Adam used a plain grappling hook and rope, while Jamie had a special cannon that could shoot the hook 100 ft (30 m) in the air. While it took several tries for Adam to throw the grappling hook over a 20-foot (6.1 m) wall and gain purchase, Jamie managed to accomplish this task in one shot. They then attempted to scale the wall, but they found that scaling a wall with just a grappling hook and rope was too difficult and time-consuming. Adam and Jamie then began working on different parts of the popular grappling hook gadgets. Adam would build the gun that would deliver the grappling hook into the wall, while Jamie would build the winch that would allow the superhero to actually scale the wall. Jamie tested his handheld winch, which managed to pull him up 27 ft (8.2 m) in just 20 seconds. However, he had to cut the line since he had neglected to add a reverse function as a way to get down. Adam then tested his gun, which took numerous tries to find purchase in the wall. When Adam attempted to swing from the line, it instantly failed. Even with such mixed results, the MythBusters agreed that a handheld grappling hook device was too implausible.

=== Ring Punch ===
Myth statement	Status	Notes
A superhero can punch a person so hard, he can leave a scar that matches the imprint on his ring. This myth was based on the comic book superhero The Phantom.	Busted	First, the Build Team measured the force of their punches and compared them to the punching strength of professional fighters. Grant then constructed a punching robot that could replicate these forces. Meanwhile, Tory constructed a ballistics gel fist while Kari designed the rings out of sterling silver. For the target, the Build Team obtained a human skull and stretched pig skin over it to simulate human skin. Punching the head with Tory's level of strength caused some damage, but it did not produce a ring-shaped scar. The professional fighter's level of strength produced similar results. The Build Team then used superhero-level strength, which crushed the skull. The Build Team concluded that a punch powerful enough to leave an imprint of their ring would most likely crush the victim's skull and kill him. (Throughout the portions of the episodes where they continually tested this myth, Tory mentions he may have broken his hand on the force gauge.)

=== Phone Booth Quick Change ===
Myth statement	Status	Notes
A superhero can change into his or her costume while inside a phone booth.	Confirmed	The Build Team took turns removing their street clothes to reveal their superhero costumes while inside a phone booth. Kari was the fastest, changing in just 33 seconds, while Tory was the slowest, taking around 80 seconds to change.

=== Vehicle Grappling Hook ===
Myth statement	Status	Notes
A car can fire a grappling hook and use it to make sharp turns at high speeds.	Busted	The Build Team converted the vehicle (Pontiac Trans Am) used in the earlier Knight Rider myth into a mock Batmobile dubbed the "Mythmobile". They then built a nitrogen-powered cannon portable enough to fit in the car and powerful enough to launch the steel grappling hook. They then tested how fast a car would need to go to make a manual turn impossible, which was about 30 mph (48 km/h). While they were able to hook the grappling hook around the target, the cable always snapped when the car attempted to make the turn. They concluded, while the other aspects of the myth are plausible, no rope or cable that is strong enough to withstand the force currently exists.

== Episode 87 – "Myth Revolution" ==
- Original air date: September 5, 2007

The MythBusters revisit several past myths with a special twist. This time, they are exploring several side myths that they had missed while testing the main myths.

=== Swatting a Bullet ===
Myth statement	Status	Notes
A modern ninja can slap a bullet out of the air. (From Catching an Arrow)	Busted	The Build Team first set up a small-scale test by firing paintballs at Tory and seeing if he could slap the paintballs away. During the test, Tory proved that human reflexes were fast enough to slap away a paintball. The Build Team then constructed a rig that would mimic a human hand making a slapping motion and used it to try to slap bullets fired from a 9-mm handgun. The Build Team quickly discovered that human speed was nowhere near fast enough to slap the bullet, so they powered up the rig to slap at superhuman speed. The hand managed to slap the bullet, but it was not powerful enough to significantly change the bullet's trajectory (it just cut the hand).

=== Thumbs Over the Airbag ===
Myth statement	Status	Notes
Drivers who hold the steering wheel in the 10–2 position can have their thumbs ripped off by a deploying airbag. (From Lockpick of Death)	Busted	The Build Team obtained steering wheels with working airbags and created a pair of ballistics gel hands that would simulate a driver holding the steering wheel in the 10–2 position. When the airbag deployed, it knocked the arms off the steering wheel, but it did not cause any visible damage to the thumbs. The Build Team then tested the myth with the driver's hands positioned in a fashion similar to the Vulcan salute with the thumbs directly over the airbag, based on a report of an actual thumb injury. The deploying airbag caused serious damage to the thumbs, including breaks in the simulated bones. However, because the myth specified the commonly used 10–2 position, the myth was busted.

=== Exploding RFID Tags ===
Myth statement	Status	Notes
An RFID tag will explode if placed inside an MRI. (From Exploding Tattoo)	Busted	The Build Team inserted an RFID tag into pig flesh and placed it inside the MRI, but they failed to get any results. Kari then had an RFID tag placed inside her arm and was placed inside the MRI. The RFID tag remained unaffected and left Kari unharmed.

=== Breathing Through a Tire ===
Myth statement	Status	Notes
A person can stay under water for an extended period of time by breathing the air from a car tire. (From Underwater Car)	Busted	Once again, Adam volunteered to sit inside a sinking car. Once the car sank, Adam exited the vehicle, cut a hole in the tire, and attempted to breathe the air leaking from it. However, he could not breathe in enough air from the tire and was forced to breathe from an emergency air tank.

=== Beating the Speed Camera ===
Fans complained about inconsistencies in the first speed camera tests, prompting the MythBusters to revisit the tests to see if a speed camera were 10 ft (3.0 m) from the ground, it can be beaten by...

Myth statement	Status	Notes
...a magnified cover.	Re-busted	The magnified cover partially obscured the license plate from the higher-angle camera but not enough to deter a ticket; only one character was obfuscated.
...a reflective cover.	Re-busted	The reflective cover failed to obscure the license plate.
...commercial spray.	Re-busted	The commercial spray failed to obscure the license plate.
...pure, raw, unadulterated speed.	Confirmed	Acknowledging the success of Top Gear, which Jamie referred to as "a car show in the UK" in beating the speed camera, the MythBusters obtained a racecar dubbed "The Beast", which used a jet engine that could propel it speeds of up to 300 mph (480 km/h) (by comparison, the TVR Tuscan S that The Stig drove to beat a British Gatso speed camera with the needed 170 mph (270 km/h) to succeed). In the first run, The Beast hit 245 mph (394 km/h) and managed to pass the camera so fast that it never took a picture. In the second run, the speed camera was slightly modified to account for the increased speed, but it still failed to take a picture of The Beast, which traveled faster than in the first run. Even though the speed camera was beaten, the MythBusters pointed out that only specialized cars like The Beast could achieve those kinds of speeds and would therefore be very easy to find by the authorities.

=== Snow Rescue ===
Myth statement	Status	Notes
A trained dog can rescue a person trapped in an avalanche. (From Snow Special)	Confirmed	This is seen only on the Discovery Channel's website. Adam was buried in a snow cave with 15 minutes of air and an emergency beacon. A trained dog was able to locate Adam with time to spare.

== Episode 88 – "Trailblazers" ==
- Original air date: October 31, 2007

Adam and Jamie get on the trail of some flammable Hollywood fables, while Kari, Grant, and Tory break out the defibrillator for some electrifying action.

=== Vapor Trail ===
Myth statement	Status	Notes
If the trail of gasoline from the leaking gas tank of a moving vehicle is lit, the fire can catch up to the tank and blow up the car.	Busted	Through small-scale tests, the MythBusters discovered that gasoline burns at just over 3 mph (4.8 km/h), which is as fast as a brisk walk. They then burned leaking gasoline indoors using both a remote control car and a regular pickup, and the flame did not catch up to the gasoline tank. A car going at the low speed of 20 mph (32 km/h) could easily outrun the stream of fire. Finally, the MythBusters let the gasoline catch up to the tank, and it did not explode. Finally, trying to cause an explosion, the MythBusters filled the tank with enough gasoline to get the fuel/air mixture into the "butter zone", where the right mix of air and gasoline vapor will cause an explosion. However, not even the fuel/air mix could make the tank explode, completely busting the myth.

=== Gunpowder Keg ===
Myth statement	Status	Notes
One can outrun a trail of burning gunpowder and kick the trail out before the burning powder reaches its explosive destination.	Plausible	In large-scale testing, an even trail of gunpowder was laid out on a plywood floor. Adam outran the fire and kicked out the trail with plenty of time to spare. Jamie gave it a shot, but Adam hindered his attempt and the powder reached the end. The tests showed that the igniting gunpowder did not move very fast, with Adam showing that a brisk walk is enough to overtake the flame. (US narrator Robert Lee called the myth "confirmed", but Adam and Jamie's verdict was "plausible".)
A trail of burning gunpowder can set off the keg from which the powder spilled.	Plausible	The MythBusters then figured, what if the person failed to make it in time? They laid out a final trail of gunpowder and remotely ignited it. As expected, the keg exploded. Adam called this explosion "the best we've ever done".

=== Shocking Defibrillator ===
In these three myths, using Grant's homemade defibrillator from Exploding Nitro Patches, the Build Team tests whether a defibrillator can...

Myth statement	Status	Notes
...burn someone if the electricity arcs with an underwire bra.	Plausible	The bra did cause a burn, but only when the wire was exposed and the paddles were placed very close to the exposed wire. This would not be likely in normal circumstances, as the paddles would never be placed so close together and medical staff are trained to remove possible obstructions before using a defibrillator.
...burn someone if the electricity arcs with a nipple piercing.	Plausible	The nipple piercing did cause a severe burn (and caused cratering in the ballistics gel dummy), but only when the paddles were placed very close to the piercing. This would also not be likely in normal circumstances; see above.
...jump-start a car. (This myth was available only online.)	Busted	The high voltage generated by the defibrillator was enough to destroy the car's starter motor, rendering it immobile.

== Episode 89 – "Exploding Water Heater" ==
- Original air date: November 7, 2007

=== Exploding Water Heater ===
Myth statement	Status	Notes
A water heater can explode like a rocket and shoot through the roof of a house.	Confirmed	Remnant of the water heater In small-scale testing, the MythBusters started with a small six-gallon (23 L) water heater and disabled all of its safety features under the theory of poor installation or neglect. While the water heater eventually ruptured, it did not explode like a rocket. The MythBusters then upgraded to a larger 30-gallon (110 L) water heater, which exploded with significantly greater force, sending the water heater several hundred feet into the air. To confirm the stated myth, the MythBusters obtained a full-sized 52-gallon (200 L) water heater and built a shack around it with a roof that followed standard California building codes. The water heater eventually exploded, shooting through the roof 500 ft (150 m) into the air and disintegrating the shack. In light of these results, the MythBusters deemed the myth was confirmed. The MythBusters also mentioned two real-life cases of rocketing water heaters found by their researchers, including one in which the heater went through several floors and loosened the house from its foundation, leading to the house being condemned.

=== Blue Jean Myths ===
The Build Team tested two myths that revolved around denim jeans.

Myth statement	Status	Notes
If a person is being dragged by a horse, the friction caused by the movement will make the jeans catch fire.	Busted	Wearing full body padding and a denim shirt and jeans, Tory allowed himself to be pulled along the ground by a horse. While the movement and friction did increase the surface temperature of the jeans, it was not enough to cause the jeans to combust. The Build Team then moved the experiment into the lab, where they simulated the friction caused by being dragged by a horse with a power sander. However, when they applied the jeans to the power sander, the jeans were torn apart before they could combust. The Build Team then agreed that friction alone cannot make jeans catch fire.
Shrinking jeans while wearing them in a hot bath for six hours can kill a person.	Busted	The theory behind this myth is that if a person wears a pair of jeans and sits in a hot bath intending to shrink them to fit, the shrinking jeans can cut off blood circulation to the legs, which can cause a lethal clot or require the legs to be amputated. The Build Team experimented with a pair of ballistic gel legs with tubes running through it simulating blood vessels. They then covered the legs in jeans and put them in a hot bath for six hours, but they found no change in blood flow. They then had Grant wear a pair of blue jeans and had him sit in a hot bath for six hours. During the experiment, Grant was continually monitored by a medical expert, and by the end of the six hours, he was declared healthy and in no risk of death. The Build Team decided the myth was busted, but they reminded the audience that blood clots and cutting off blood circulation are very real dangers and should not be taken lightly.

== Episode 90 – "Special Supersized Myths" ==
- Original air date: November 14, 2007

This episode was "dedicated to Mr. Wizard", Don Herbert, known for his Mr. Wizard science programs, which ran from 1951 to 1990. It ran for 2 hours.

=== Supersize Shark ===
The MythBusters tested the following myths involving great white sharks.

Myth statement	Status	Notes
Sharks can hunt by feeling low-frequency sound waves transmitted through water.	Busted	The MythBusters traveled to the waters of South Africa where great white sharks are abundant and placed underwater speakers in the water. After transmitting sounds at various frequencies ranging from 40 to 100 Hz and even resorting to high-frequency sound, the MythBusters failed to attract any sharks. Though they did attract one shark when using a high-frequency sound, this was deemed to be a false positive caused by Jamie's presence in a shark cage, and when it was retested without Jamie being in the water, no sharks were attracted.
The presence of dolphins can deter sharks from attacking their prey.	Plausible	This myth was born from the stories of dolphins protecting shipwrecked sailors from sharks. The MythBusters built an animatronic replica of a dolphin and took it to the shark-infested waters of South Africa. They tested the waters by throwing in a seal-shaped lure to have it attacked by a great white shark barely five seconds after it hit the water. They then placed the fake dolphin in the water with the lure. The sharks approached the lure, but when they saw the dolphin, they opted not to attack. The MythBusters replaced the lure with actual bait, but the results were the same, and the sharks appeared reluctant to attack. However, once the MythBusters removed the dolphin, the sharks immediately began attacking the lures and bait again. With these results and with plenty of anecdotal evidence, the MythBusters decided that the myth was plausible.

=== Supersize Jet Taxi ===
This is a retest of the old Jet Taxi myth, because the MythBusters were unable to obtain a full-sized plane and fans both complained and mentioned the BBC automotive show Top Gear test of the myth (which was acknowledged ambiguously by Jamie referencing a "British TV show"). This time, the Build Team tests if the engines of a Boeing 747 can flip...

Myth statement	Status	Notes
...a taxi.	Confirmed	The Build Team obtained a taxi and towed it across the rear of the 747 as it was powering up for takeoff. The moment the taxi crossed the engine exhaust, it was lifted into the air and flipped several times, completely demolishing the vehicle.
...a school bus.	Confirmed	Like with the taxi, the team towed the school bus across the path of the 747 engine exhaust. Also like the taxi, the school bus was lifted off the ground; it rolled 1½ times and was completely demolished.
...a small airplane.	Confirmed	Like the taxi and school bus before it, the airplane was thrown into the air and suffered significant damage when it crossed the path of the 747 engine exhaust.

=== Supersize Rocket Car ===
This is a spinoff of a previous myth, the JATO Rocket Car. This time, the MythBusters test for the results, not the circumstances. Former Build Team member Scottie Chapman makes an appearance in this segment.

Myth statement	Status	Notes
A Chevy Impala with rockets can move fast enough to achieve flight.	Appropriately supersized	The MythBusters started with small-scale tests and determined their old JATO configuration was not suitable for the myth, because the top-mounted rockets caused the car to veer off course. Instead, they opted to mount the rocket tubes inside the trunk of the car to achieve a more stable trajectory. They then obtained a Chevy Impala (named "Holly" by its previous owner) and made the necessary modifications to accommodate the rockets. To ensure the car would get into the air, the MythBusters set up a ramp built from two shipping containers. However, when they started the actual test, the car and the rockets exploded, completely destroying the car before it could even leave the ramp. Because none of the central questions of the myth were answered despite the care and expertise that had gone into the test, the MythBusters had trouble deciding what to call the myth. In the end, they agreed that the myth was "appropriately supersized".

=== Supersize Cruise Ship Waterskiing ===
Myth statement	Status	Notes
A person can waterski behind a full-sized cruise ship.	Confirmed	The Build Team first started by having Tory practice waterskiing. However, instead of waterskis, Tory opted to use a wakeboard. After some practice wakeboarding and swapping tow lines between two different boats, the Build Team then tested the myth on a full-sized cruise ship, the MS Regal Empress. While his first try failed, Tory managed to successfully transfer to the tow line attached to the cruise ship and managed to waterski behind it, proving the myth is possible.

== Episode 91 – "Shooting Fish in a Barrel" ==
- Original air date: November 21, 2007

=== Shooting Fish in a Barrel ===
Myth statement	Status	Notes
A person can easily shoot a fish in a barrel.	Confirmed	Because they could not realistically use a live fish to test for the myth, the MythBusters obtained a dead fish and inserted a motor inside it to simulate swimming. They then placed the fish in a wooden barrel filled with water and fired at the fish with a 9-mm pistol. However, their first shot missed, so Adam painted the interior of the barrel white and added transparent windows to improve visibility. With these improvements, both Adam and Jamie were easily able to hit the fish. They then decided to use a multitude of smaller fish and upgraded their weapon to a shotgun. The buckshot managed to hit some of the fish, but only three of the total of 30 fish. Adam and Jamie then tested whether just the shockwave could kill the fish. Using pressure patches, they found it can kill the fish, meaning a person would not need to actually hit the fish. To put the myth to bed, Adam and Jamie decamped to a firing range owned by weapons manufacturer Dillon Aero. On location, the MythBusters placed a dead 3-foot (0.91 m) sea bass in a water-filled barrel. They then used a Dillon Aero M134 minigun and several thousand rounds of ammunition to destroy the barrel and fish. The Dillon Aero site was referred to onscreen as a "secret location" because the rounds are illegal in California, where MythBusters is based. Because of the vagueness of the conditions of the myth, the MythBusters declared that shooting fish in a barrel is easy.
The pressure shockwave of a bullet hitting the water is enough to kill a fish.	Confirmed	The MythBusters calculated that the lethal amount of force required to kill a fish is 8.15 pounds per square inch (56.2 kPa). However, the instrument that measured pressure was not fast enough to register the impact of the bullet, so the MythBusters instead opted to use stickers that measured g-force. After firing a single 9-mm bullet, the MythBusters saw the shockwave of the bullet was enough to trip all three stickers (50 g, 75 g and 100 g). This means the shooter does not necessarily have to hit the fish to kill it.

=== Hot Chili Cures ===
The Build Team wolfs down various spicy peppers to test whether the following substances are better hot chili cures than milk.

Myth statement	Status	Notes
Milk	n/a (control)	The milk was used as a control because it is already proven to reduce discomfort due to the fats it contains. Grant and Tory used the milk as a measuring stick for the rest of the supposed cures, all of which were found to be less effective than milk.
Water	Busted	The water did not perform as well as the milk, because although it initially helped, the discomfort immediately returned once the water left the mouth.
Beer	Busted	The beer helped slightly, but it was still not very effective.
Tequila	Busted	The tequila initially intensified the discomfort, but the numbness induced by it slightly lessened the pain. However, it still was not very effective.
Toothpaste	Busted	The toothpaste had no effect at all.
Petroleum jelly	Busted	The petroleum jelly failed to work, which made the MythBusters rather disgusted.
Wasabi	Busted	Grant reacted violently to the wasabi, stating it only made his discomfort worse, but Tory stated he actually felt some relief. However, it still was not effective as milk. (The discrepancy may be partly because Grant was eating crushed jalapeños, while Tory was eating far spicier habaneros.)

=== Elephants Scared of Mice ===
Myth statement	Status	Notes
Elephants are scared of mice.	Plausible	Adam first visited Wilke's Wildlife Rescue in South Africa to borrow some mice for the myth. The MythBusters then traveled to Aquila Private Game Reserve to find wild elephants to test. The MythBusters hid a mouse under a ball of elephant dung, planning to flip the dung over and reveal the mouse when the elephants approached it. When the MythBusters flipped the dung and revealed the mouse, the approaching elephant was startled and quickly moved away from the mouse. The MythBusters then flipped dung without the mouse under it, but the elephants did not react at all. The MythBusters then repeated their first experiment to confirm their results, and the elephant noticed the mouse and actively avoided it. Even though the elephants did not panic at the sight of the mouse, their acting cautiously around them was enough to have the myth be considered plausible, as it was not known whether the reaction was due to fear of or empathy for the mouse.

== Episode 92 – "Pirates 2" ==
- Original air date: November 28, 2007

In this episode, the MythBusters test several myths based on scenes from the film Pirates of the Caribbean: The Curse of the Black Pearl and other pirate movies.

=== Rowboat Submarine ===
Myth statement	Status	Notes
Two pirates can use a rowboat as a makeshift submarine by walking along the ocean bottom and using the rowboat to hold a pocket of breathable air.	Busted	On their first test, the MythBusters tried walking into a pool with a rowboat over their heads, but their bodies were too buoyant and were unable to pull the rowboat to the bottom of the pool. To solve their buoyancy problem, the MythBusters loaded themselves down with over 60 lb (27 kg) of pirate gear and attempted the myth again, but they met similar results. They then weighed the boat down with 500 lb (230 kg) of weights, but not even that was enough to keep the rowboat under the surface. The MythBusters then calculated that it would take more than 2,000 lb (910 kg) of force to keep the rowboat and the air pocket underwater, making the myth impractical if not impossible. To explain the scene in the movie, the MythBusters demonstrated that it was achieved through special effects and clever editing.

=== Buried in Sand ===
Myth statement	Status	Notes
A man buried up to his neck in wet sand (dubbed a "sand necktie") cannot escape his inevitable demise.	Confirmed	Tory was the Build Team member to get buried in sand to test the myth. He was buried in dry sand up to his neck to see if the weight of sand would cause him to pass out, and if not, whether he could escape on his own. Within five minutes, Tory was able to free one of his arms. From there, it took him 86 minutes to dig himself out of the sand. However, the Build Team decided to use more accurate conditions and buried Grant in wet sand, continually adding water to simulate the rising tide. While Grant tried to escape, the water kept pushing the sand back into the cavities he was digging out, immobilizing him. Grant was eventually forced to rely on outside help to escape, confirming the myth that the sand necktie is a lethal and dastardly way to get rid of a person.

=== Cannonball Chaos ===
Adam and Jamie tested several cannonball myths involving improvised cannon ammunition and whether they are lethal or not. Using a Civil War-era cannon nicknamed "Old Moses" that had been used to help test Cannonball vs. Shrapnel on the first Pirate Special, the MythBusters fired various improvised materials that would be found on a period pirate ship at dead pigs to test their lethality. Some of these improvised cannonballs include...

Myth statement	Status	Notes
...grapeshot.	Confirmed	The grapeshot is actual period ammunition that pirates used and was used as a control test. The grapeshot destroyed the target.
...bottles of rum.	Busted	The glass shattered and the rum vaporized during the firing, leaving only small bits of glass to hit the target. Aside from minor superficial damage and the smell of rum, glass rum bottles are harmless.
...cutlery.	Busted	The cutlery did not cause any noticeable damage. All of the projectiles were spread too far out and lacked the force to cause any lethal damage.
...steak knives.	Plausible	Because they were placed in a container, the steak knives were all pointing forward and had their direction set. This allowed them to hit the target, causing serious cuts and lacerations.
...a peg leg.	Busted	When fired, the peg leg was completely destroyed, leaving no visible trace except for wood chips.
...nails.	Plausible	The sharp, heavy nails caused almost as much damage as the grapeshot, tearing through the target with relative ease. Adam likened the effect to that of a needlegun.
...chains.	Confirmed	The long, heavy chain remained intact and did the most damage to the target, almost ripping it in half.

=== MacGyver Mini Myth ===
During the commercial break, the MythBusters tested this myth as a promo for their upcoming MacGyver special.

Myth statement	Status	Notes
A person can break a lightbulb by using drain cleaner shot out of a spray bottle.	Confirmed	The drain cleaner caused a thermal shock in the hot glass of the lightbulb, causing it to shatter. This concept was also demonstrated during the Lethal Lava Lamp myth, when Grant successfully caused a lava lamp to explode by spraying it with water.

== Episode 93 – "Confederate Steam Gun" ==
- Original air date: December 5, 2007

=== Steam Powered Machine Gun ===
Myth statement	Status	Notes
The Confederates successfully created a working steam-powered centrifugal gun (firing bullets using centrifugal force).	Busted	The MythBusters first tried to confirm whether a steam-powered machine gun in fact existed. A Civil War weapons expert confirmed the Winans Steam Gun actually existed and has the blueprints to prove it. However, the gun's lethality and effectiveness were unconfirmed. The MythBusters then constructed a steam gun based on the blueprints they received, with a pair of water heaters providing the steam to spin the barrel. On their test run, they fired a single round that struck the gun's steel safety shield, creating a deep dent that could potentially cause lethal damage to a person. Satisfied with the test run, the MythBusters took the gun for full-scale testing. They tested the gun based on three major factors: a range of 500 yd (460 m), a rate of fire of 400 rounds per minute, and the weapon's requirement of being lethal. The gun performed well on the first two criteria, firing five rounds per second at a range of 700 yd (640 m). However, the weapon lacked any lethal force at ranges beyond point blank, and it was not very reliable in terms of delivering the bullets to the targets in an effective manner. The MythBusters concluded that, as a concept and a machine, the steam gun performed perfectly, but as a weapon, it was too unreliable and impractical.

=== Beating the Lie Detector ===
Myth statement	Status	Notes
Through mental or physical means, a person can fool a lie detector test from a polygraph machine.	Plausible	To make the test results genuine, Tory and Grant were instructed to steal money from a safe while the innocent Kari was used as a control. Also, they were promised a reward (first-class seats on the next MythBusters trip) for beating the test and a punishment (cleaning and waxing the entire crew's cars) for failing. During the test, Tory attempted to use pain to hide his lying, while Grant tried to focus his mind. However, neither of them could beat the polygraph. While they both failed the test, the Build Team decided not to rule out the possibility that some people out there could be capable of fooling a polygraph.
A person can fool a lie detector test from an fMRI, which measures brain activity.	Plausible	Like in the first test, all three Build Team members had to steal something to fulfill the conditions of the myth. Each member had the choice of stealing either a ring or a watch, and the members then underwent a lie detector test while being scanned by the fMRI. Like before, there was a reward ($1,000) and a punishment (a trip back to San Francisco via bus, a 3,077-mile (4,952 km) trip) if they passed or failed the test. Both Tori and Kari tried to think happy and fearful thoughts, respectively, while Grant tried to keep his brain active for the entire test. In the end, Tory and Kari both failed the test, while Grant managed to fool the fMRI, making the myth possible. The results showed all three stole the ring when, in fact, Grant actually stole the watch (in addition to the ring, Tory also stole a DVD from an adjacent drawer). As a result, Grant received $1,000, while Kari and Tory were forced to ride the bus back to San Francisco.

=== MacGyver Mini Myth ===
During the commercial break, the MythBusters tested this myth as a promo for their upcoming MacGyver special.

Myth statement	Status	Notes
A person can "repair" a fuse box by wrapping a burnt-out fuse with a metal foil gum wrapper.	Confirmed	The metal in the shiny part of the gum wrapper acts as a replacement conduit for the burnt-out fuse, allowing the circuit to be re-established when replaced. However, this makeshift replacement may not burn out under excess current as a proper fuse does. Many houses have caught fire because of makeshift replacements for blown electric fuses.

== Episode 94 – "Airplane Hour" ==
- Original air date: December 12, 2007

=== Talked into Landing ===
Myth statement	Status	Notes
An untrained civilian can be instructed how to successfully land a plane over the radio. This is based on the movie Airplane! (which in turn was based on the movie Zero Hour!)	Plausible	This myth, based on multiple airplane movies, posed a challenge to the MythBusters because they could not afford to test it using real aircraft. Instead, they used a NASA simulator. For their first test, both Adam and Jamie decided to see if they could land a plane unaided. However, since both MythBusters had no flight experience and had no idea what most of the instruments and controls did, their attempts ended badly. Jamie came in far too fast and at a bad angle, and he could not locate and activate the landing gear, resulting in his simulated plane flipping over and breaking apart (which potentially would have led to a 100% fatality rate in real life). Adam failed to locate his destination, stalled before even making it to the airport, and ended up crash-landing in a field, an outcome that ironically would have resulted in far fewer fatalities than Jamie's landing. In their second runs, Adam and Jamie had Terry, a licensed pilot, give them instructions via radio. With Terry's help, both Adam and Jamie were able to land their planes safely. However, though the test was a success, Terry pointed out that most modern planes are so advanced, their autopilot systems can land the planes by themselves, negating the need for civilian pilots. This information, coupled with the lack of any recorded incidents, led the MythBusters to declare the myth plausible.

=== Point Break Trilogy ===
The MythBusters test three skydiving myths based on a scene in the film Point Break.

Myth statement	Status	Notes
A person can freefall for over 90 seconds from a height of 4,000 ft (1,200 m).	Busted	The Build Team dropped a Simulaid from a plane at a height of 4,000 ft and measured the time it took for it to hit the ground. They timed the total freefall time at just 31 seconds, which would make the 90-second freefall scene in the movie impossible, especially considering the additional time needed to account for parachuting was not factored in (the Simulaid was simply dropped to the ground, exploding on impact).
Two people can have a conversation with each other while in freefall.	Busted	To test this myth, Grant skydived out of a plane. A skydiving instructor was to approach Grant while he was freefalling and then attempt to say to Grant, "Grant, if you pull my finger, you will hear a tuba." During the freefall, the instructor yelled the phrase multiple times, but Grant could not hear him, because the sound of the air rushing past drowned out his voice. The Build Team concluded it was impossible to have a conversation in freefall.
By streamlining their bodies, people can catch up to other people in tandem freefalling at terminal velocity in the skydiving position with a 15-second head start from 15,000 ft (4,600 m).	Confirmed	The Build Team first performed several small-scale tests using wind tunnels, and demonstrated that objects with a greater surface area do, in fact, have a slower terminal velocity than objects with equal mass but smaller surface area. For the full-scale test, Tory, while in tandem with another skydiver, jumped out of a plane and assumed the skydiving position. Nick, a professional skydiver, gave Tory and the skydiving instructor a 15-second head start, then jumped out of the plane after him and assumed a streamlined posture. 20 seconds after leaving the plane, Nick closed the distance between himself and Tory and passed Tory just as he was deploying his parachute. With such definitive results, the Build Team declared the myth confirmed.

=== MacGyver Mini Myth ===
During the commercial break, the MythBusters tested this myth as a promo for their upcoming MacGyver special.

Myth statement	Status	Notes
A person can stop a sulfuric acid leak with chocolate and hot water.	Confirmed	Grant and Kari demonstrated that the myth was possible, showing that the sugars in the chocolate reacted with the acid to form a plastic mass that plugged up the leak.
