= Birds in a truck riddle =

Scientific riddle about weight in motion

The birds in a truck riddle is a riddle that asks whether a container or a truck carrying birds changes in weight when the birds inside are flying.

The television series MythBusters investigated the question in a 2007 episode, testing it both with a box of pigeons and again with a model helicopter. They concluded that the contents being in flight made no difference to the weight, and theorised that the downdraft of air from the wings or rotors pressed down against the base of the box with the same force as the resting bird or helicopter.

A drone research team from Stanford University measured the forces involved in a bird's hovering and found that it created "double the lift during the downstroke [of the wings] so that the birds did not have to lift their weight during the upstroke", with the amount of lift on the upstroke being "almost none". They concluded that a truck containing a few birds would fluctuate in weight over time, but a larger flock flapping at random would cancel one another and leave the truck's weight unaffected.
