= RFF =

RFF may refer to:

== Organizations ==
- Rainforest Foundation Fund, charitable foundation dedicated to preserving the rainforest by preserving indigenous peoples rights
- Reading for the Future, a series of grassroots groups that encourage literacy using speculative fiction (science fiction, fantasy, etc.)
- Réseau Ferré de France, company that owned and maintained the French national railway network from 1997 to 2014
- Resources for the Future, American nonprofit that researches the environment, energy and natural resources
- Ricardo Franco Front, a Colombian revolutionary guerrilla group
- Russian Fencing Federation, the Russian fencing federation

== Other ==
- Regina Folk Festival, annual music festival in Saskatchewan, Canada
- Request for feedback, a page concerning Wikipedia article feedback
- Rescue Firefighting can refer to Aircraft Rescue and Firefighting
- Radial Forearm Flap, a surgical technique for Phalloplasty
