= Oathbound: Domains of the Forge =

2002 Fantasy role-playing game

- Cover art by a'lis
- Designers: Greg Dent; Brannon Hollingsworth; Jim Butler; Todd Morasch; Darrin Drader; Ken Marable
- Illustrators: a'lis; Brannon Hall; Ginger Kubic; Jeremy Jarvis; Kevin Wasden; Stephanie Pui-Mun Law; Todd Morasch
- Publishers: Bastion Press
- Publication: 2002
- Genres: Fantasy RPG

Oathbound: Domains of the Forge is a fantasy role-playing game campaign setting published by Bastion Press in 2002 that uses the d20 System rules.

== Setting ==
The focus of the campaign is the city of Penance on the harsh world called The Forge, where an ancient god has been imprisoned. The player characters are involuntarily pulled from their home planes to The Forge by rival clans seeking power. To prove their worth, they are given to tasks to fulfill.

Following an introduction, the book is divided into eight chapters of information about the campaign world:

1. Arrival: Character creation, and basic information about the world and its two suns
2. Inhabitants of the Forge: New races and classes
3. Matter of Prestige: New prestige classes
4. The Seven Domains: The seven continents of the world
5. The Black Flock: The people
6. City of Penance: Information about the city and the laws
7. The Bloodholds: Other places of note
8. The Hub Tavern

The ninth chapter is an adventure, "Dark Welcomes". The book finishes with three appendices (rules, monsters, and non-player character stat blocks), and a glossary.

== Publication history ==
In 2002, Bastion Press released a role-playing game campaign setting, Oathbound: Domains of the Forge that featured a harsh setting that Dale Donovan noted was similar to the grim and difficult "classic Ravenloft and Planescape settings." The 352-page hardcover book was created by Greg Dent, with additional material by Brannon Hollingsworth, Jim Butler, Todd Morasch, Darrin Drader, and Ken Marable. Cover art was by a'lis, with interior art by a'lis, Brannon Hall, Ginger Kubic, Jeremy Jarvis, Kevin Wasden, Stephanie Pui-Mun Law, and Todd Morasch, and cartography by Niklas Brandt, Rob Lee and Todd Morasch.

Over the next year, Bastion released eight supplements for the new campaign world. Oathbound: Arena was published in 2003.

== Reception ==
Dale Donovan, writing for d20 Weekly, noted that "it has a large amount of setting material accompanied by additional character generation and other rules material, adventure ideas, and a complete introductory adventure." Donovan also noted that the feel of the setting was conveyed by the art, writing, "One of the main artists is Todd Morasch, who has a coarse style with emaciated-looking, gnarl-knuckled creatures and bold, wavy detail lines. Stephanie Pui-Man Law and a'lis (who does the cover illustration) are arguably the most talented contributors; their styles help create an eerie, otherworldly feel for the setting."

In Issue 10 of Fictional Reality, Mark Theurer liked the variety of new races "including an upright walking kitty cat (actually very cool), a humanoid canine race and more." Theurer noted that this is not a campaign "for the meek or mild. It is a place of mighty, and I do mean mighty, heroes fighting powerful villains. Can it turn into a pure hack 'n' slash game? Sure, but any game can. This world is for wading through massive amounts of lackeys to get to the main bad guy and then going toe to toe with him and hoping that all of your special abilities and powers can get you through it safely." Theurer concluded, "Basically, it's a high-powered campaign world that looks like a lot of fun to play in."

In Issue 2 of d20Zine, Steve Creech commented, "This is quite possibly the best new campaign setting on the market, period. It has a feel reminiscent of Planescape with a touch of Dark Sun added in. It's a power gamer's dream world, with the potential to hit epic levels with one supercharged and stacked character." Creech concluded, "Considering that Bastion Press' CEO is Jim Butler (who was Brand Manager of TSR for seven years), it's no surprise that this book is taking the gaming world by storm."
