= Friends & Familiars =

Friends & Familiars is a 2003 role-playing game supplement published by Bastion Press.

== Contents ==
Friends & Familiars is a supplement in which players and gamemasters will find ready‑to‑use sidekicks, cohorts, animal companions, and familiars designed to add to any adventuring party with flavorful supporting characters.

== Reviews ==
- Pyramid
- Fictional Reality #12
- Legions Realm Monthly (Issue 11 - Jul 2003)
