= List of MythBusters cast members =

This is a list of cast members of the television series MythBusters on the Discovery Channel. In addition to the core cast members, the MythBusters team includes several honorary MythBusters, and some recurring guests.

== Mythbusters Reboot cast ==
=== Jon Lung ===
Jon Lung is a product designer and graphic designer from Staten Island, New York, known as a co-host on the 2017 revival of the series. Lung and his co-host Brian Louden were selected as hosts after winning the reality television competition series Mythbusters: The Search. This aired in January and February 2016.

=== Brian Louden ===
Brian Louden is an American pilot and rescue diver from Houston, Texas, known as a co-host on the 2017 revival of Mythbusters. Louden and his co-host Jon Lung won the spots from competition on Mythbusters: The Search, which aired in January and February 2016.

== Original cast ==
Recurring experts are sometimes referred to as "Honorary MythBusters".

=== Jamie Hyneman ===
Jamie Hyneman is a main cast member on MythBusters, along with Adam Savage. His demeanor on the show is calm, logical and no-nonsense, in stark contrast to Savage's more animated, impulsive and energetic persona. The two often have very different ideas for performing experiments and building devices. Hyneman's ideas tend to be simpler, and he prefers to reduce a solution to its most basic form. These two experts have competed when testing myths.

In numerous interviews, both Jamie and Adam have said that one of the reasons for the show's success is their differences. They have a mutual respect for each other's work. However, they do not have a social relationship outside the show. In a 2015 interview, they said their arguments were part of early seasons, but they worked to have such occasions reduced on-camera.

=== Adam Savage ===
Adam Savage has been involved in MythBusters since its creation. Savage's demeanor on MythBusters is animated and energetic, providing a foil to Jamie Hyneman's more reserved straight man persona.

Savage and Hyneman were the only hosts of the show for the first season of MythBusters. Starting with the second season, members of Hyneman's staff were introduced and began to appear regularly in episodes; Kari Byron, Tory Belleci and welder Scottie Chapman appeared in the second season. In the third season, Chapman was replaced by Grant Imahara, a robot builder and model maker.

=== Kari Byron ===
Kari Byron was a co-host until 2014 with fellow co-hosts of the "Build Team," Tory Belleci and Grant Imahara. She and the others also hosted their own segments. She became involved in the show after persistently showing up at Hyneman's M5 Industries workshop in a desire to get hired by his company. She and the other Build Team members were given a more prominent role beginning with the show's second season. Not having had a long history in show business, Byron at first found it difficult to act naturally with this more visible position but gradually became more accustomed to it. Byron first appeared in the background of JATO Rocket Car, the first episode of the show, though her first proper on screen appearance was in episode two, where Adam and Jamie made a mold of her butt to test the myth of getting stuck on an airplane toilet.

During the second half of the 2009 season, Byron was on maternity leave and was temporarily replaced by Jessi Combs. In 2010–2011, Byron had her own show, Head Rush, on the Science Channel, geared towards science education and teens.

Byron has also hosted the 2010 and 2011 editions of Large, Dangerous Rocket Ships for the Science Channel. She and Belleci made a guest appearance on the October 3, 2012 episode of the Discovery series Sons of Guns. They test fired some of the weapons in the Red Jacket shop and watched as the staff retested a myth previously busted by the Build Team: that a propane tank could explode if struck by a bullet. On August 21, 2014, it was announced that Byron, along with co-stars Grant Imahara and Tory Belleci, would be leaving MythBusters.

=== Tory Belleci ===
Tory Belleci is often considered by fellow MythBusters Kari Byron and Grant Imahara to be more of a daredevil and, as such, often performs the more dangerous stunts when testing a myth. These have included: testing the "Red Flag to a Bull" myth; testing the myth that a human's tongue will instantly stick to a frozen pole, in the "Frozen Tongue" myth; and the "Underwater Blow Dart" myth. One of his more popular stunts, shown several times on the show, was an attempt to jump over a toy wagon on a bicycle; the attempt failed, resulting in Belleci flipping forward, landing on his face and skidding across the pavement, only to immediately respond with an "I'm okay". As a result of doing these stunts, he is often involved in comical accidents while testing myths. According to the October 28, 2012 episode of MythBusters, he suffers from acrophobia.

During the "Fall Guys" myth, Belleci fell off a roof, and despite being strapped into a safety harness system, landed in an open window ledge below the drop point, and injured his leg causing substantial bleeding.

He and Byron made a guest appearance on the October 3, 2012 episode of the Discovery series Sons of Guns. They test fired some of the weapons in the Red Jacket shop and watched as the staff retested a myth previously busted by the Build Team: that a propane tank could explode if struck by a bullet.

On August 21, 2014, it was announced that Belleci, along with co-stars Byron and Imahara, would be leaving MythBusters.

=== Grant Imahara ===
Grant Imahara (1970 – 2020) joined MythBusters on the invitation of friend and occasional employer Jamie Hyneman and Industrial Light and Magic (ILM) colleague Linda Wolkovitch. He joined as the third member of the Build Team, replacing former MythBusters welder Scottie Chapman. His colleagues often jokingly referred to him as the "geek" of the Build Team. He often made the robots that are needed for the show and otherwise specialized in operating the computers and electronics for the myths. On August 21, 2014, it was announced that Grant, along with co-stars Kari Byron and Tory Belleci, would be leaving MythBusters.

Grant Imahara died on July 13, 2020, after suffering a brain aneurysm.

=== Christine Chamberlain ===
Christine Chamberlain (1971–2025) was a "MythTern" (a portmanteau of MythBusters and "intern"), joining the MythBusters team after winning a Discovery Channel contest; she appeared during the show’s second season. In that role, she primarily assisted hosts Jamie Hyneman and Adam Savage during myth tests. She remained with the program through its third season.

She died at age 54, after a six-year battle with cancer, at the Blue Ridge Hospice Inpatient Care Center in Winchester, Virginia.

=== Scottie Chapman ===
Scottie Chapman (born 1971) is a former member of the Build Team who was called the "Mistress of Metal" for her work in welding and metal craft. Notable for her tattoos (which were used for a myth investigation in one episode), she departed after the third season. On her MySpace blog, she revealed that she would not be back as a regular, but she appeared in the "Supersize Rocket Car" as well as in the "Young Scientist Special" as part of The Great Ice Debate myth. She also made an appearance in one episode broadcast after her departure that involved an experiment, executed over a number of months, which began when she was with the show and ended after she had left (episode "Breaking Glass," Myth "Rolling Stone Gathers No Moss"). She was formerly the bassist of the band Fuzz, which would evolve into Weezer.

=== Jessi Combs ===
Jessi Combs was a cast member on the Build Team for a short time. Her arrival was announced on July 31, 2009, by the Discovery Channel when co-host Kari Byron went on maternity leave prior to giving birth to her first child. Byron left the show on the episode "Dumpster Diving" and Combs replaced her on the show. Combs was an American television personality and metal fabricator who appeared from 2005 to 2008 on the Spike show Xtreme 4x4. Prior to appearing there she appeared on the TLC program Overhaulin' as a guest fabricator.

After high school Combs turned down a scholarship to attend an interior design school. In 2004, she graduated from WyoTech in the Collision & Refinishing Core Program at the top of her class. She also took the Street Rod Fabrication and Custom Fabrication and High Performance Powertrain programs.

Combs died in August 2019 in a crash of a jet-powered high-speed race car in southeastern Oregon while attempting to set a new four-wheel land speed record, which was posthumously awarded to her in June 2020 by Guinness World Records.

=== Jessie Nelson ===
Jessie Nelson, or simply Jess, was a "MythTern" (portmanteau of MythBusters and intern). She made her first appearance on MythBusters during the "Archimedes' Death Ray" episode as part of the girls' team on the small scale build-off. She appeared again in the "Whirlpool of Death" myth. In that episode she assisted Adam with the building of scale models to test the whirlpool, and towards the end of the episode got to hold his hand as he vomited in the whirlpool tank, adding her own memorable quote to MythBusters: "Smells like pizza". She then appeared in the "Mega Movie Myths" episode, where she helped find a car for the use with the ejector seat myth. She also appeared in "Air Cylinder of Death", "Christmas Lights", "Hindenburg Mystery", "Western Myths", "Walking on Water", "Birds in a Truck", "Bifurcated Boat", mixing the non-Newtonian fluid, "Pirate Special", "Special Supersized Myths", and "Superhero Hour".

== Staff ==
=== Robert Lee ===
Robert Lee (born September 25, 1957) is the narrator of the series, who shares the job of explaining experiments and facts with the hosts, often using a copious number of puns and humor. In some regions—such as the United Kingdom and Scandinavia—he is replaced by Irish and British narrators Robin Banks or Daisy Beaumont. Rufus Hound narrates the version of the show that aired on the BBC. Lee returned to narrate the revival MythBusters: The Search as well, and he followed this with the narration for MythBusters Jr., Motor MythBusters and Mythbusters: There’s Your Problem! This makes him the longest continuous serving member of the franchise.

=== Heather Joseph-Witham ===
Heather Joseph-Witham is a professional folklorist who appeared on-screen during seasons 1–2. Her role was to explain the background and urban legends that the myths were based on, but was later dropped as the stories tested became more absurdist. She received her doctorate from the now defunct Folklore and Mythology Program at UCLA in 1998, and is currently an associate professor at Otis College of Art and Design in Los Angeles, California.

=== Eric Haven ===
Eric Haven is a former comic book artist who draws the blueprint drawings used to introduce each episode, as was revealed in the 2012 season's "Mailbag Special". He took over the job from the MythBusters (Savage and Hyneman) and the former Build Team (Byron, Belleci, and Imahara).

He has been a researcher for the program for 33 episodes from 2004 to 2005 and served as an associate producer from 2005 until 2012 for 143 episodes. Since the broadcast of Season 13, he has been credited as a producer for the show.

== Guests ==
=== Helpers ===
Many people have come on the show to provide assistance with the myths.

- Frank Doyle Jr.: Frank Doyle is a retired FBI agent who appeared in the myths "Cement Mix-Up", "Exploding Gas Tank", "Exploding Pants", "Crimes and Myth-Demeanors 2", "Exploding Nitro Patches", "Voice Flame Extinguisher", and others. Frank assisted the MythBusters by helping load a cement truck with 850 pounds of explosives to cause its destruction. He also provided the tracer ammunition for the revisit of the myth that shooting a gas tank can cause it to explode "Car Capers" revisit. He also supervised the making of the explosives for the "Exploding Pants" myth. Doyle has since become somewhat of a regular on the show, helping with many explosives that are used.
- Erik Gates: Erik Gates was a rocketry expert who appeared in the episodes JATO Chevy, Ming Dynasty Astronaut, Swingset 360, Confederate Rocket, and Salami Rocket. Erik provided rockets and his rocketry expertise in several myths, starting with the very first experiment—the legend of the Jet Assisted Take-Off Chevy Impala. Gates died in a construction accident unrelated to rocketry on December 20, 2009, at the age of 47. The episode Mini Myth Mayhem was dedicated to his memory.
- J. D. Nelson: J. D. Nelson is the Alameda County sheriff sergeant and EOD team leader who appeared in the myths Exploding Pants, Dynamite Paint Job, and others. "JD" supervises the use of the Alameda County Sheriff Office's bomb disposal range in Dublin, California for many of the explosives episodes.
- Alan Normandy: Initially introduced as sergeant Alan Normandy, and now a South San Francisco police lieutenant and court-certified firearms expert, he appeared in the myths Blown Away, Finger in a Barrel, Catching a Bullet in Your Teeth, Bullets Fired Up, Mega Movie Myths, Firearms Folklore, Myths Revisited, Exploding Tire of Death, Killer Cigarette Butts, and others. Normandy frequently assists the MythBusters by supplying modern firearms—including fully automatic weapons—to evaluate myths and legends about guns. A 29-year police veteran, chief firearms instructor, former SWAT officer and police sniper, Normandy often assists the MythBusters as a range safety officer, and also provides some legal and firearms expertise. A regular guest and often referred to as an "old friend," Normandy has been a consultant to the production even before the first episode aired.
- Roger Schwenke: Roger Schwenke is an acoustician for Meyer Sound who appeared in the myths "Does a Duck's Quack Echo?", "Brown Note", "Breaking Glass", and "Sounds Bogus". He was called an honorary MythBuster by Adam in the "Breaking Glass" myth. He also helped bust the "Does a Duck's Quack Echo?" and brown note myths as well as demonstrating how to shatter glass using only sound waves.
- Sanjay Singh: Sanjay Singh was an emergency medical technician who appeared in the episodes Poppy Seed Drug Test, Myths Revisited, Exploding Pants, Pirates 2, and others. He worked in Alameda County and was on several episodes of MythBusters beginning with the third episode until his death in 2010. He provided first aid back up to the show's hosts. The episode Storm Chasing Myths was dedicated to his memory.
- Stephen C. Smith: Stephen C. Smith is an aeronautic engineer that provided expertise on the Concrete Glider episode, the "Plywood Parachute" portion of the Beat the Radar Detector episode, and the formation flying portion of the Toilet Bomb episode.

=== Celebrities ===
In addition, several celebrity guests have been brought in to guest on the show, either for their high level of skill or knowledge in a certain area. This list is non-extensive.

- Jonathan Banks: Jonathan Banks is an actor, famous for portraying the hitman Mike Ehrmantraut in Breaking Bad. He plays a shady hitman during opening and closing skits in the episode "Supernatural Shooters"
- Alton Brown: Alton Brown is a celebrity chef who was featured on the episode "Food Fables".
- Sophia Bush: Sophia Bush is an actress who appeared in the episode "Star Wars Special".
- James Cameron: James Cameron is a film director who appeared in the myth "A Titanic Tale".
- Matt Cain: Matt Cain is an MLB pitcher from the myth "Monk Magic".
- Roger Clemens: Roger Clemens is an MLB pitcher from the episode "Baseball Myths".
- Shirley Eaton: Shirley Eaton is a James Bond actress from the myth "Goldfinger".
- Jon Fitch: Jon Fitch is a MMA fighter from the myth "Coffin Punch".
- Vince Gilligan: Vince Gilligan is the creator and producer of Breaking Bad, and was in the episode "Breaking Bad Special".
- Ray Guy: Ray Guy was an NFL punter from the myth "Helium Football".
- Ricky Jay: Ricky Jay was a world-record-holding card thrower from the myth "Killer Deck".
- Barack Obama: U.S. president Barack Obama asked Jamie and Adam to meet him in the White House Library, to which they obliged. He gave them the "Archimedes Solar Ray 3.0" myth, asking them to revisit for the third time the "Ancient Death Ray" myth and report the results, and was once again busted.
- Aaron Paul: Aaron Paul is an actor who plays Jesse Pinkman on the show Breaking Bad, and was in the episode "Breaking Bad Special".
- Seth Rogen: Seth Rogen is an actor featured in the episode "Green Hornet Special".
- Michael Rooker: Michael Rooker is an actor who played Merle Dixon on The Walking Dead and was in the episode "Zombie Special".
- Wallace Spearmon Jr.: Wallace Spearmon Jr. is an olympic sprinter who tried to run on water in "Running On Water".
- Nik Wallenda: Nik Wallenda is an acrobat, aerialist, daredevil, and high wire artist who appeared on the episode "Duct Tape Canyon".

== Non-human assistants ==
=== Buster ===
Buster is a Hybrid II model crash test dummy that plays an important role in many experiments by taking the place of a human subject in the more dangerous myth tests. The first and most recognized of the dummies used in the show, Buster was introduced in the beginning of the first season for the "Exploding Toilet" myth. Savage had purchased the dummy to take the place of Hyneman (who had second thoughts about testing the myth because he realized the foam he would be using was flammable), and Hyneman gave it its name.

Because of the nature of the situations in which the MythBusters use him, Buster has been subjected to forces and situations that far exceed his original design parameters as an automobile crash test dummy. As a testament to the danger of the tests in which he is used—often resulting in his being broken into pieces, burnt, or otherwise mutilated—Buster has had to be extensively repaired and rebuilt over the course of the series to the point that the episode "Buster Special" was devoted to his being completely redesigned and rebuilt as "Buster 2.0". Buster was designed with quick and simple repair in mind, and boasts improved joints, with a more realistic range of movement, and easily replaceable poplar wood "bones". Poplar was chosen because its shear strength was very similar to human bone, providing an accurate gauge of how bones would react in experiments. Buster's new flesh (with the exception of his face, hands, and feet) is made of a silicone marketed for use in animatronics called Dragon Skin. Buster's original head was retained when he was rebuilt, but it had to be replaced after it was shattered during a mishap on the "Escape Slide Parachute" myth. His original face was retained to fit over his replacement head. They tested Buster 2.0 by dropping him 60 feet (about 20 meters) off a crane while inside a donated Cadillac named Earl.

The MythBusters have at times adapted Buster to fit specialized equipment or give him new functionality. For myths involving holding onto things (such as "Plywood Builder"), his hands are replaced with clamps or quick-release rigs. For myths involving falls (like "Hammer Bridge Drop"), monitoring equipment, such as accelerometers or shock gauges, is installed on or within his body. He was also attached to a pneumatic system at one time so he could punch sharks for the "Shark Punching" myth.

Just before testing the revisited "Jet Taxi" myth, Buster spoke two lines as chosen by fans: "Adam, I am your father," followed by "I wonder if Mike Rowe is hiring," a reference to the host of Discovery's other popular show, Dirty Jobs. In October 2007, the fan site also uploaded a video spoof of Buster's life narrated by Jim Forbes of Behind the Music and starring Tory, Grant, Kari and Adam.

As Grant once noted, there are very few times when Buster is actually used for his original purpose (a crash test dummy) on MythBusters.

Since his introduction on the show (in something of a running joke) the cast refer to Buster as if he were an actual living person, and consider him a full member of the cast in his own right. On several myths that involved long drops or intense forces in which Buster was damaged, Adam and others expressed dismay and concern over Buster having been damaged so extensively, most notably during the "Escape Slide Parachute" myth.

On the "Viewer Special 2" episode, a new Buster was introduced. This Buster is a former crash test dummy provided by Dayton T. Brown, Inc. The new Buster was named "Buster 2.0"—not to be confused with the remodeled "Buster 1.0". The original Buster has been retired. During the James Bond special, Buster was dressed up in a tuxedo when he was used for the exploding propane myth. In most myths involving people, Buster is usually dressed in whatever clothes are relevant to the myth (e.g. a police uniform, farmer's overalls, etc.) to give him more character and an air of faux authenticity.

In more recent episodes, the hosts of the show as well as the narrator appear to have taken up a policy of calling any human-analogue "Buster" (not just the specific crash test dummies given the name). However, this practice is very rarely, if at all, applied to dummies made out of ballistics gel or otherwise used to represent human tissue (such as pigs).

In the series finale, Buster is attached to a rocket sled and launched toward a concrete block wall at a speed of over Mach one, disintegrating on impact. Adam subsequently recovers some of the fragments and gives them to Jamie and the Build Team in a follow-up reunion special.

=== Simulaids ===
Simulaids are Buster's family of at least four dummies, dubbed "Randy" or "Rescue Randy" (father), "Jane" (mother), "Suzy" or "Simulated Suzy" (daughter), and an unnamed son. Rescue Randy has also been referred to as "Ted" (for Bus-Ted, Annihila-Ted, Humilia-Ted, and so on). These were added partly because Buster (even after his redesign) was becoming increasingly difficult to repair, and also because not all myths can be accurately tested with Buster due to his size, weight, and other factors. For instance, Suzy (a child dummy) was used to test the myth that a child could go 360 degrees around a swing set. Being representative of an adult man, Buster would not have properly fit the criteria for the myth. The Simulaids were first introduced in the Killer Brace Position myth, primarily because multiple dummies were needed for testing. At least one Simulaid has been destroyed in the course of subsequent experiments (In the "Point Break" trilogy the Simulaid was destroyed when it hit the ground from 4000 feet).

=== Ted ===
Ted is an extra crash-test dummy used in the show. In addition to this, any full-size human made from ballistics gelatin is usually named Ted, from the last syllable of bus-ted, annihila-ted, exploi-ted. One instance of Ted's use was in the "Train Suction" myth, in which he played the unsuspecting commuter.

=== Buster 4.0 ===
Buster 4.0 is an extra crash-test dummy, noted for his skin made out of leather. He made his debut in episode 184, where the build team used him to test the myth of "Super Adhesive Seatbelt."

=== Mini Buster ===
Mini Buster is the generic name given to human analogues used in small scale, most often associated with wooden mannequins. In all other cases, the figures used are either modeled after team members (by sticking a picture of their face to the doll,) or given no name at all.

=== Thermo-Man ===
Thermo-Man is a dummy made out of ballistics gel, filled with copper piping to simulate a human body's circulatory system. He was first used in the "Titanic Survival" myth, where Adam and Jamie used him to test the possibility of the film's main characters, Rose and Jack, dying of hypothermia.

=== Neck Man and Collar Boy ===
Neck Man and Collar Boy are dummy heads with extremely long necks, made from a pig's spine. They were used to test the "Tornado Decapitation" Myth, that tornado-force winds can propel a pane of glass with enough force to decapitate a human.

=== Judy, Trudy, and John ===
Judy, Trudy, and John are inflatable sex dolls used to test the "Snowplow Split" myth, that a snowplow can split a car in half following a non-injurious head on collision. As the team could not bring Buster to Wisconsin with them, the inflatable dolls were substituted, deflating to show any injuries sustained. Judy did not survive the first crash, so her sister Trudy was put in her place.

=== Deadblow ===
Deadblow, Grant Imahara's battlebot, has been used to aid the MythBusters in various ways, such as measuring vibrations in the ground (for the "Chinese Invasion Alarm" myth) to being a cat decoy (in the "Beat the Guard Dog" myth). Grant temporarily renamed the robot "Blinky" and fitted it with a set of headlights to simulate an oncoming vehicle for the "Driving in the Dark" myth.

=== Sparky ===
Sparky was a robot used multiple times on the show. In the "Gunpowder Keg" myth, Jamie took the motor and wheels from an electric wheelchair and fitted it with a metal hood for protection, a remote control, and a stand for a keg of gunpowder. The MythBusters drilled a hole in the keg and lit the ensuing trail of gunpowder on fire to see if the fire would travel up the falling stream of gunpowder and explode the keg. After many trials, the myth was called plausible, and Sparky survived. Sparky was used again in both the "Hot Bullets" and the "Campfire Chaos" myths to drop bullets of various caliber as well as aerosol cans into a campfire to see if they could cause serious injury or death. Sparky was not damaged, but it was determined that both bullets and bug spray could cause injury but would be unlikely to kill someone if dropped into a campfire.

=== Mythdog Bo ===
Mythdog Bo is a small dog that appears in the 2017 revival of the show. She does not provide much help and only appears when she walks on set, and her random appearances have caused some jokes.

=== Buster II/Jr ===
Buster Jr is the version of Buster in the 2017 version of the show. He was introduced in the second episode, where they needed a criminal to block a propane chimney. They needed the replacement after the original was fired into a brick wall with a rocket.
