= FFR =

FFR may refer to:

== Medicine ==
- Fellowship of the Faculty of Radiology of the Royal College of Surgeons in Ireland
- Fractional flow reserve, a technique used in coronary catheterization
- Frequency following response

== Military ==
- Falster Foot Regiment, a Royal Danish Army infantry regiment
- Frontier Force Regiment, of the Pakistani Army
- Fitted For Radio, British Army designators for vehicles equipped to carry radio equipment

== Music ==
- Fast Food Rockers, a British pop group
- Fit for Rivals, an American band
- For Future Reference, a 1981 album by the British synthpop band Dramatis
- Friendly Fire Recordings, an American record label

== Sports ==
- French Rugby Federation (French: Fédération Française de Rugby), governs rugby union in France
- French Rugby League Federation (French: Fédération Française de Rugby à XIII)
- Russian Fencing Federation
- FC Fazisi Racha, a Georgian association football club

== Transportation ==
- Factory Five Racing, an American automobile kit company
- Franconian Forest Railway, in Bavaria, Germany
- Fischer Air, a defunct Czech airline

== Other ==
- Federal funds rate, in the United States
- Filtering face respirator, a particulate-filtering respirator worn on the face, such as an N95
- Five Finger Rapids, Yukon River, Canada
- Flathead Forest Reserve, Montana
- Franciscan Friars of the Renewal, a religious institute in the Latin Church of the Catholic Church
- French First Republic
- Frontline Freelance Register, association of freelance journalists who work on military and humanitarian frontlines
