= Paul Genesse =

American writer

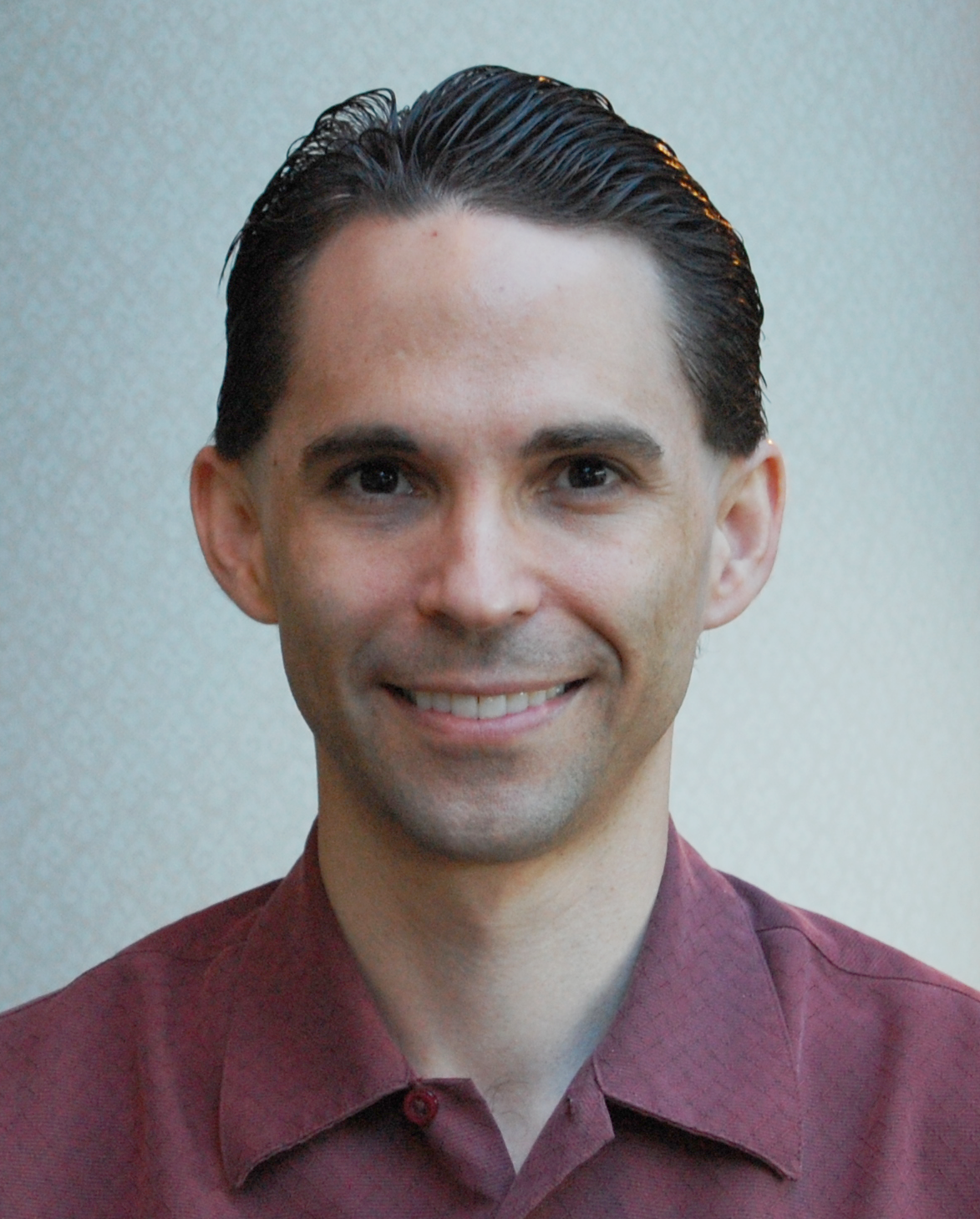
- Genesse at Mountain-Con III in 2007
- Born: 1973 (age 52–53)
- Education: Northern Arizona University
- Occupations: Registered nurse, writer
- Spouse: Tammy Lyn Feintuch
- Writing career
- Language: English
- Genre: Fantasy
- Website: paulgenesse.com

Paul Genesse (born 1973) is a writer of young adult fantasy novels and a cardiac unit nurse at Intermountain Medical Center in Murray, Utah. His first book, The Golden Cord, was a best seller for Five Star Publishing.

== Biography ==
Genesse graduated from Beatty High School in 1992 in Beatty, Nevada. While attending high school, Genesse decided he wanted to become a nurse. He graduated in 1996 with a Bachelor's degree in nursing from Northern Arizona University in Flagstaff, Arizona, where he also took multiple writing classes.

His writing has been influenced by television series such as M*A*S*H and China Beach, as well as The Lord of the Rings series by J. R. R. Tolkien.

He currently lives in South Jordan, Utah.

== Works ==
=== Iron Dragon series ===
Genesse has published two volumes of his Iron Dragon series through Five Star Publishing, the science fiction and fantasy imprint of the publishing house Gale. The third book in the series was published through Iron Dragon Books. The first volume was a best seller for the publisher, and was reprinted multiple times. There are five books in the series.

1. The Golden Cord (April 16, 2008, Five Star, ISBN 1-59414-659-4)
2. The Dragon Hunters (May 15, 2009, Five Star, ISBN 1-59414-825-2)
3. The Secret Empire (January 14, 2012, Iron Dragon, ISBN 0-9850038-0-4)
4. The Crystal Eye (forthcoming, Iron Dragon)
5. The Iron Brotherhood (finale, forthcoming, Iron Dragon)

=== Short works ===
He has also published a number of short stories in various anthologies and magazines.

- "The Mob", published in Furry Fantastic (ISBN 0756403812, Daw Books, 2006)
- "The Pirate Witch" in Pirates of the Blue Kingdoms (ISBN 0980208645, Walkabout Publishing, 2007)
- "Almost Brothers" in Fellowship Fantastic (ISBN 0756404657, Daw Books, 2008)
- "God Pays" in The Dimension Next Door (ISBN 0756405092, Daw Books, 2008)
- "Greg and Eli" in Imaginary Friends (ISBN 0756405114, Daw Books, 2008)
- "The Queen's Ransom" in Blue Kingdoms: Shades and Specters (ISBN 0980208610, Walkabout, 2008)
- "Captain Maeve" in Blue Kingdoms: Buxom Buccaneers (ISBN 0980208653, Walkabout, 2009)
- "Kitty and the City" in Catopolis (ISBN 0756405149, Daw Books, 2009)
- "Revenge of the Little Match Girl" in Terribly Twisted Tales (ISBN 0756405548, Daw Books, 2009)
- "The Nubian Queen" in Steampunk'd (ISBN 0756406439, Daw Books, 2010)
- "The Cost of a Tasmanian Tiger" in The Chain Story created by Mike Stackpole

=== As editor ===
- The Crimson Pact, Volume 1 (ISBN 0983263159, Alliteration Ink, 2011)
- The Crimson Pact, Volume 2 (ISBN 0984006508, Alliteration Ink, 2011)
- The Crimson Pact, Volume 3 (ISBN 0984006559, Alliteration Ink, 2012)
- The Crimson Pact, Volume 4 (ISBN 978-0-9858254-6-1, Alliteration Ink, 2012)
