= Oathbound: Arena =

Oathbound: Arena is a 2003 role-playing game supplement published by Bastion Press.

== Contents ==
Oathbound: Arena is a supplement in which a war‑scarred desert domain sourcebook introduces brutal armies, new races and prestige options, mass‑combat systems, devastating war machines, and an artifact‑hunting adventure, all centered on surviving the ruthless trials of Barbello's crimson sands.

== Reviews ==
- Pyramid
- Fictional Reality (Issue 14 - Dec 2003)
- Legions Realm Monthly (Issue 17 - Feb 2004)
