= Reading for the Future =

Reading for the Future (RFF) is an international group which encourages literacy and reading through the use of speculative fiction. Some regional groups collect new and used books which are then distributed free of charge to schools and libraries. For many rural schools, this is the only way they get new books.

RFF does not have a central organization but is rather a series of grassroots groups. Developing the Young Reader (DYR) associated with RFF in April 2000. Reading for the Future does have a Web site filled with resources for educators, librarians, home schoolers and parents (website).

== Groups ==
Regional groups are listed alphabetically. If webpages are known, they are linked.

- Utah RFF Utah is a member of the Utah Speculative Fiction Council.
