= Blendo =

Combat robot

Blendo is a combat robot designed and built by Jamie Hyneman. Adam Savage handled the electronics and control systems.

Blendo pioneered the full-body kinetic energy spinner weapon, which later became common in BattleBots. The robot featured a shell constructed from a wok and was powered by a 5hp lawnmower engine. Blades attached to the shell inflicted damage on its opponents, often removing bodywork and, in some cases, propelling them over the polycarbonate safety shields into the audience.

== Combat performance ==
=== Robot Wars ===
Blendo made its debut in the second Robot Wars competition in San Francisco (1995). After two matches against the robots Namreko and DoMore, it was deemed too hazardous to continue by the event supervisors and the insurance company, due to pieces of its opponents being thrown over the arena walls. Blendo was granted co-champion status in exchange for withdrawing from the competition. It returned in the fourth Robot Wars in 1997, after the height of the arena walls had been increased to prevent debris from reaching the audience. In this competition, Blendo once again faced off against two robots (Hercules and Punjar) and swiftly defeated both. However, after causing damage to the arena walls in both matches, Blendo was again asked to withdraw in exchange for co-champion status.

=== BattleBots ===
Blendo participated in a total of four BattleBots competitions. Despite its reputation for extreme violence, Blendo experienced limited success in BattleBots. Factors contributing to its lack of success included a stronger arena design capable of containing Blendo's energy, more resilient opponents capable of withstanding multiple hits, similar spinner designs in other robots, and Blendo's tendency to self-destruct, leading to its defeat in the first match in all four BattleBots events in which it competed.

=== After BattleBots ===
Following its time on BattleBots, Jamie Hyneman and Adam Savage went on to host the Discovery Channel series MythBusters, which also featured fellow combat robot competitor Grant Imahara and his robot, Deadblow.

Blendo is an inaugural member of the Combat Robot Hall of Fame.
