= Punkin chunkin =

Sport of hurling a pumpkin mechanically

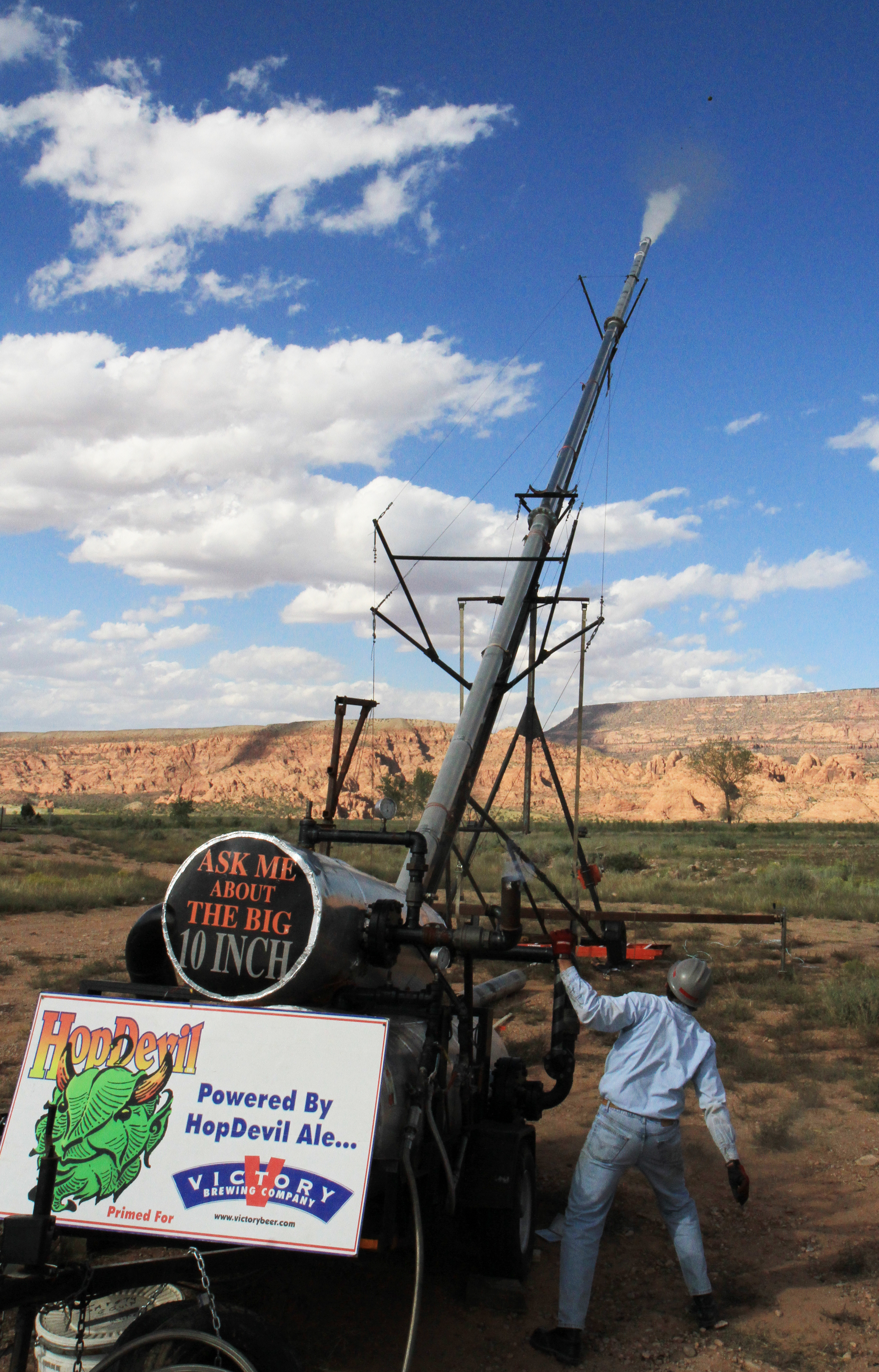
"Big 10 Inch" takes a world record shot in Moab, Utah, September 9, 2010

Punkin chunkin or pumpkin chucking is the sport of hurling a pumpkin by mechanical means for distance. The devices used include slingshots, catapults, centrifugals, trebuchets, and pneumatic (air) cannons.

Punkin chunkin competitions, formal and informal, exist throughout the United States in the autumn, particularly in early November as a means to dispose of surplus pumpkins from Halloween. World Championship Punkin Chunkin, held annually in November in Delaware by the World Championship Punkin Chunkin Association (WCPCA), was the first and largest annual competition. The event ran annually from 1985 to 2013; a myriad of legal and logistical problems caused multiple events to be cancelled after that, and subsequent championships have been more sporadic. A European Championship has been held in Bikschote, Belgium, each year since 2004.

The Guinness world record shot is held by a pneumatic cannon dubbed "Big 10 Inch", at 5,545.43 feet (1,690.25 m), on September 9, 2010, in Moab, Utah. The shot received certification from Guinness World Records in early February 2011. Big 10 Inch has also competed many times at the WCPC event in Delaware. The WCPCA World Record, which includes only shots made at the annual World Championship event, is currently held by The American Chunker air cannon, captained by Brian Labrie, at 4,694.68 feet (1,430.94 m) on November 1, 2013, in Bridgeville, Delaware. The difference in results between Delaware and Utah can be attributed to Utah's higher elevation (and thus lower air pressure, thereby reducing air resistance) and the more restrictive subset of the WCPCA only counting its own competitions.

The range achieved by devices depends on their mass, shape, and size; the yield limits, stiffness, pitch, and elevation of the hurler, and the weather. The choice of pumpkin is another important variable; Casper, Lumina, and La Estrella are the most common varieties used for competitions since they tend to have thicker rinds than other varieties and can thus withstand greater forces during launch. One of the core rules for competition is that the pumpkin must remain whole after leaving the device until hitting the ground for the chunk to count. Pumpkins that burst after leaving the barrel or sling are referred to as "pie" (short for "pumpkin pie in the sky"); such launches were disqualified under WCPC rules.

Punkin Chunkin events, usually independently organized, are held throughout the United States, with active annual contests in Lake County, California; Clayton, New York; Ellicottville, New York; Brasstown, North Carolina and Bald Eagle State Park in Centre County, Pennsylvania.

A variant of the competition, the pumpkin shoot, emphasizes accuracy over distance, as competitors aim to hit a specific target. A "Great Pumpkin Shoot" has been held in Olean, New York, most years since 2010.

== World Championship Punkin Chunkin ==
Video of a pressurized air pumpkin cannon being fired.

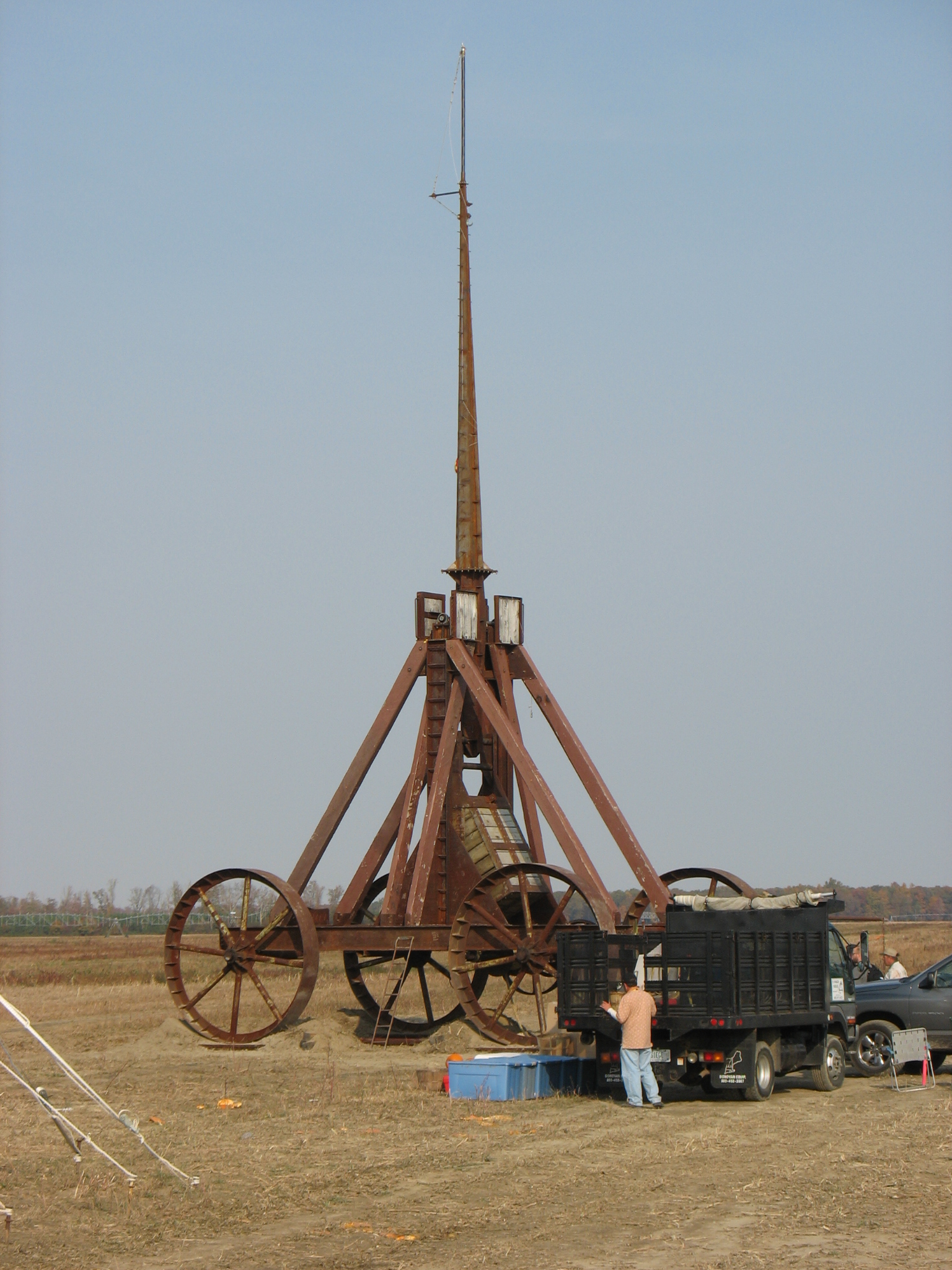
"Yankee Siege" trebuchet, from New Hampshire, at 2008 Punkin' Chunkin'

World Championship Punkin Chunkin (WCPC) was the name of an annual contest held the first full weekend after Halloween in Delaware from 1986 through 2013 and in 2016. It was also held in 2019 in Illinois and is scheduled to take place in 2023 in Oklahoma. It is governed by the World Championship Punkin Chunkin Association (WCPCA).

Teams competed in the following divisions: Air Cannon, Female Air Cannon, Centrifugal, Catapult, Torsion, Trebuchet, Human Powered, Centrifugal Human Powered, Youth Air Cannon, Youth Catapult, Youth Trebuchet, Youth Human Powered, Youth 10 & Under, and Theatrical. Each division competed strictly for distance except for the Theatrical division which relies on a fan vote. The teams get three shots, one taken on each of three consecutive days. Only a team's longest shot is scored for official results. Spotters riding on ATVs find the impact point, and then a professional surveyor calculates the distance based on GPS coordinates of the impact and the machine. The impact point is marked with color-coded spray paint.

The event also featured amusement rides, food vendors, fireworks, live concerts, a pumpkin cooking contest, a chili cook-off, the Miss Punkin Chunkin pageant, and other attractions.

The event originated in 1986, and early in its history convened in Lewes, Delaware. Due to increasing space requirements (distance of shots, number of teams, and number of spectators) new locations in Sussex County had to be found. In 2007, WCPC moved to Bridgeville (at 38°43′20″N 75°32′08″W), near the intersection of Seashore Highway and Chaplains Chapel Road. About 75 teams competed, the event drew more than 20,000 people, and grossed more than $800,000 in ticket sales and associated revenues. More than 70% of that money would be donated to a variety of community organizations. Starting with the 2014 WCPCA event, festivities were to be held at Dover International Speedway in Dover, after the landowner who hosted the event evicted the event from his property due to a 2011 lawsuit (one that was eventually settled out of court). However, the 2014 event was canceled due to logistics problems (the speedway did not have long enough of a straightaway to cover the one-mile distance the competition requires), and the contest was expected to be permanently shuttered prior to the 2015 contest due to insurance companies refusing to cover the contest.

After considering a move to a location in Maryland, the organization announced plans to revive the World Championship Punkin Chunkin contest for 2016 at its previous site in Bridgeville after the insurance concerns were addressed.

No World Championship was held in 2017 because of another injury-related lawsuit; before the decision to cancel, the organizers had suggested that the 2017 championship would have been the last one due to the lawsuit and the related withdrawal of its television partner. 2018 came and went with the organization having gone silent, and no championship was held that year.

In May 2019, the World Championship announced its intent to relocate to Chanute Air Force Base in Rantoul, Illinois, and return for 2019. Organizers cited better state protections against liability in Illinois compared to Delaware, Illinois' status as the country's most prolific pumpkin growing state, the fact that the former air force base is a brownfield that does not need to be cleared of crops (allowing the event to be held a few weeks earlier in the season), and lower costs for police and fire protection.

The 2019 World Championship was substantially downsized (in terms of number of competitors) due to the relocation, as many of the Delaware regulars were unwilling to trek across several states to partake. This allowed for a more intimate experience (spectators could visit the contestants in the pits before the competition began), but also led the organizers to believe the event would run at a financial loss for them.

For 2020, the organizers sought to return to the eastern United States but were unable to do so because of coronavirus restrictions; the event was to be held in 2020 in an altered format, but organizers again claimed they could not find a host "in (a state) with favorable liability laws;" they also declined to hold the event in 2021, citing "many obstacles in our path in recent years - some well known and others, not so much(.)" The organizers stated that though they loved Delaware, they were convinced that "certain organizations within our state (...) will work to see that (the changes necessary to return the event to Delaware) never happen" and that it was outright illegal to host the event in Maryland due to firearms laws in that state, limiting options for returning the contest to Delmarva as they had hoped. No championship was held in 2021 or 2022.

In 2023, the World Championship Punkin Chunkin, in lieu of holding their own competition, licensed the brand to Punkin Chunkin International, who held a World Championship in a field east of Vinita, Oklahoma, on October 28 of that year. No further licenses have been issued and no other World Championships have been held in the years since.

=== Television coverage ===
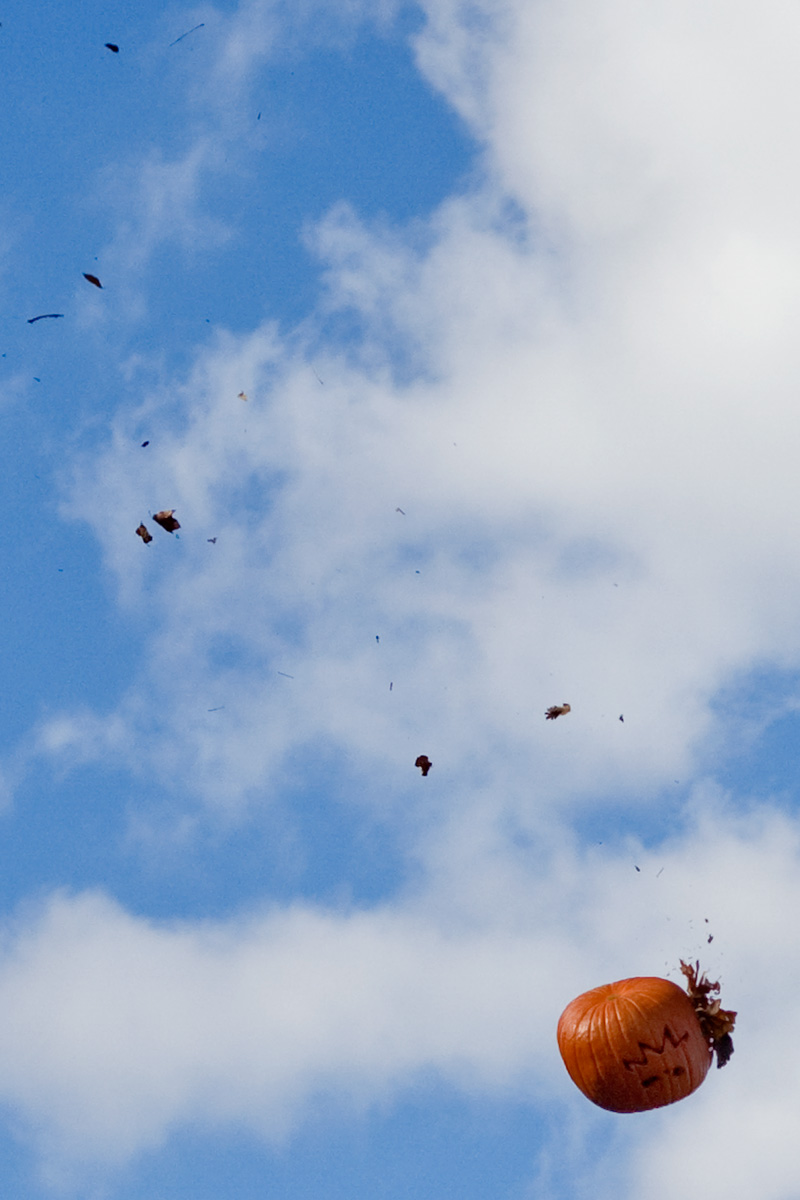
Pumpkin chucking, Pumpkin chucked from trebuchet in Ohio

The Science Channel carried the World Championship from 2009 to 2016. WCPCA and the Science Channel agreed to a new 3-year contract that ran through the 2016 WCPC. In 2009 and 2010 the "Punkin Chunkin" special aired on tape delay on Thanksgiving Day. Each year of coverage thus far has featured an hour long special titled "Road to the Chunk" that preceded coverage of the WCPC event. The previous year's contest is shown around Halloween and sporadically throughout the year. Road to Punkin Chunkin 2011 featured three 30-minute episodes airing weekly leading up to Thanksgiving.

The first televised Punkin Chunkin special was aired by the Discovery Channel in 2002, hosted by Bryan Callen. In 2008, after a six-year hiatus, Punkin Chunkin returned to cable television on the Science channel as a 1-hour program, hosted by Brad Sherwood. 2009 brought a two-episode broadcast covering the teams heading to the event, and then the event itself, each hosted by Zach Selwyn and Mike Senese. 2010 was hosted by Jamie Hyneman and Adam Savage of the Discovery Channel program MythBusters. From 2011 to 2013, the special was hosted by MythBusters "Build Team" members Tory Belleci, Kari Byron, and Grant Imahara. Clip shows compiling footage of previous Punkin Chunkin events aired in 2014 and 2015.

During taping of the 2016 festivities, one of the event's air cannons malfunctioned and chunks of flying metal struck a member of the TV production staff in the head seriously injuring her; after the injury, Science Channel opted to discontinue filming and not air Punkin Chunkin that year. The staffer is believed to have recovered from her injuries. The producer filed a lawsuit against the WCPCA, its officers and the landowner in 2017, prompting them to cancel the World Championship for 2017. The lawsuit was dismissed in early 2019.

The 2019 event was not televised on a traditional broadcast, cable or satellite outlet. The organizers streamed most of the festivities on Facebook Live. The 2023 event was also scheduled to stream on Facebook Live but was postponed when a rainstorm disrupted the Starlink Internet connection; a taped version of the event was released on the Punkin Chunkin Web site on Thanksgiving afternoon that year.

An unidentified event billed both as "pumpkin sling" and "pumpkin toss" was added to the lineup of ESPN8 The Ocho in 2026.

== World Championship Punkin Chunkin champions ==
Overview of Punkin Chunkin champions
Year	Team name	Distance (feet)
2019	Chunk Norris	4,091
2016	American Chunker Inc.	4,305.82
2015	American Chunker Inc.	4,536.57
2013	American Chunker Inc	4,694.68
2012	Young Glory III	3,887.92
2011	Second Amendment Too	4,329.37
2010	Hormone Blaster	3,755.65
2009	Big 10 Inch	4,162.65
2008	Young Glory III	4,483.51
2007	Big 10 Inch	4,211.27
2006	2nd Amendment	3,870.50
2005	2nd Amendment	4,331.72
2004	Old Glory	4,224.00
2003	2nd Amendment	4,434.28
2002	2nd Amendment	3,881.54
2001	Old Glory	3,911.02
2000	Old Glory	4,086
1999	Big 10 Inch	3,695
1998	Q36 Pumpkin Modulator	4,026
1997	Universal Soldier	3,718
1996	Q36 Pumpkin Modulator	2,710
1995	Mello Yellow	2,655
1994	Universal Soldier	2,508
1993	Under Pressure	1,204
1992	De Terminator	852
1991	Ultimate Warrior	776
1990	Ultimate Warrior	775
1989	John Ellsworth	612
1988	Melson - Thompson	600
1987	Melson - Thompson	300
1986	Melson - Thompson	178

== World Championship Punkin Chunkin records ==
Overview of World Championship Punkin Chunkin records
Machine class	Team name	Distance (feet)	Year
Adult Air	American Chunker Inc	4,694.68	2013
Adult Female Air	Hormone Blaster	4,382.96	2013
Adult Centrifugal	Bad To The Bone	3,245.58	2013
Adult Catapult	Chunk Norris	4,091	2019
Adult Trebuchet	Colossal Thunder	3,377	2019
Adult Human Powered	Shooda Noed Beter	2,343.42	2016
Adult Torsion	ETHOS	3,792	2019
Adult Centrifugal Human Powered	Smokin Lamas	1,776.37	2013
Youth Air	Snot Rocket	4,206.32	2013
Youth Catapult	Chunk 58	1731.43	2018
Youth Trebuchet	Colossal Thunder	2,402.63	2013
Youth Human Powered	Stomach Virus	1,230.12	2013
Youth 10 & Under	Little Blaster	1,939.81	2002
Youth 10 & Under Catapult	Jersey Devil	1,272.64	2013
Youth 10 & Under Trebuchet	Pumpkin Pirates	418.99	2013

== See also ==
- Potato cannon
