= M5 Industries =

Special effects company in San Francisco

M5 Industries, Inc.
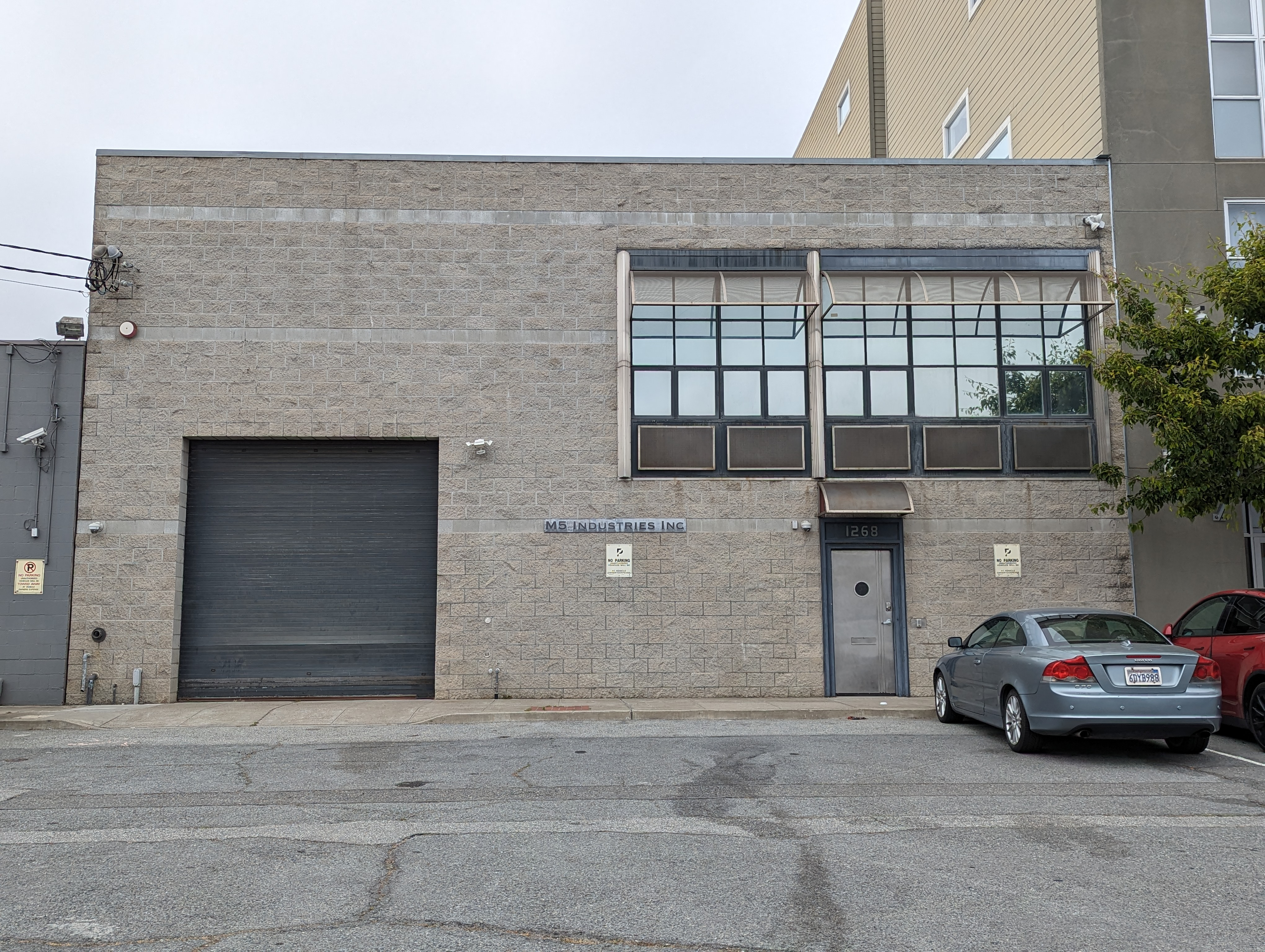
- M5 facility in San Francisco
- Company type: Private
- Industry: Motion picture support services
- Genre: Visual Effects
- Founded: 1997; 29 years ago
- Founder: Jamie Hyneman
- Headquarters: 1268 Missouri Street, San Francisco, California, US
- Services: Research and development; Custom fabrication and testing; MythBusters (formerly)
- Owner: Jamie Hyneman
- Website: Official website

M5 Industries (M5) is a special effects company in San Francisco, California, best known as the working lab of the TV series MythBusters. Founded in 1997 by Jamie Hyneman, it specialized in producing props for movies and television. Following the conclusion of filming the Mythbusters series, it became a research and development firm.

== History ==
In 1997, Jamie Hyneman took over the Colossal Pictures workshop, using it to establish M5 Industries. The company originally produced special effects props for film, including animatronic puppets, such as those seen in James and the Giant Peach and The Nightmare Before Christmas. M5 Industries has produced special effects for many commercials, such as a motorized 7 Up soft drink vending machine that shoots soda cans at people and a remote-controlled shoe for Nike.

The facilities were used extensively for the production of the television show MythBusters, with the M5 Industries workshop used as the primary shooting location for the first season. During the second season, when a second team of MythBusters was introduced, a second space located at 2200 Jerrold Avenue in San Francisco, (Note: Located at 37°44′47.5″N 122°23′52.6″W) dubbed "M7" was leased for them. Many of the people who appear on MythBusters were originally employees of M5, notably Kari Byron and Tory Belleci.

Since the end of production for Mythbusters, the company no longer does special effects for movies and television, now focusing on research and development, such as engineering a tank which can be used to fight wildfires. The workshop does not offer tours or allow visits from the public because of insurance issues.

== Name ==
The company's name was suggested by Adam Savage. He intended to suggest the name of either the branch of the British secret service which built gadgets in James Bond fiction (Q Branch) or British secret service itself (MI6), but was mistaken as to the correct name, and suggested M5. Savage alleges that Hyneman never paid him the promised $50 prize for having his suggestion selected.

Grant Imahara also explained that he asked Jamie Hyneman what the "M" stood for in M5 to which he replied "Movies, Monsters, Mechanics, Machining..." and Imahara was thinking that the final M comically stood for Mustache. M5 Industries' website from 2000 says "M5 stands for Models, Machines, Miniatures, Manufacturing... and yes, at least a little bit of Magic."
