= The Daughter Also Rises =

- The Simpsons episode
- Episode no.: Season 23; Episode 13
- Directed by: Chuck Sheetz
- Written by: Rob LaZebnik
- Production code: PABF06
- Original air date: February 12, 2012

Guest appearances
- Michael Cera as Nick; Jamie Hyneman as himself; Adam Savage as himself

Episode features
- Chalkboard gag: "I will not replace a candy heart with a frog's heart"
- Couch gag: Moe and a group of ancillary characters come in and congratulate the show for reaching 500 episodes, but Lisa (using a Simpsons guide book) tells Moe and the others that this is only the 499th episode. Moe reveals that Fox is only going to do the congratulations once, much to everyone else's disappointment.

Episode chronology
← Previous "Moe Goes from Rags to Riches"	Next → "At Long Last Leave"
- The Simpsons season 23

"The Daughter Also Rises" is the thirteenth episode of the twenty-third season of the American animated television series The Simpsons. The episode was directed by Chuck Sheetz and written by Rob LaZebnik. It originally aired on the Fox network in the United States on February 12, 2012.

The episode parodies the MythBusters program in that Bart and Milhouse are inspired by a show called MythCrackers to debunk some urban schoolyard legends. The hosts of MythBusters, Adam Savage and Jamie Hyneman, guest starred in the episode as themselves, while actor Michael Cera played Lisa's new love interest Nick. "The Daughter Also Rises" received a 2.0 Nielsen rating in the demographic for adults aged 18–49, and was viewed by around 4.26 million people. The episode received mixed reviews.

== Plot ==
On Valentine's Day, Marge allows Homer to have a guys' night out with Bart as her Valentine's Day gift to him while she and Lisa go to a restaurant for dinner. While Homer and Bart have a good time and bond as father and son, Marge finds she has little in common with Lisa and distracts herself at the buffet table. During this, Lisa spots a handsome boy named Nick through a crack in the wall between their tables. The two become attracted to each other and begin dating.

Eventually, Lisa invites Nick over to meet the rest of her family. However, despite being impressed by Nick, Marge warns Lisa not to spend too much time with him, worried that Lisa is becoming too different from her. Confused at this, Lisa goes to Grampa for advice.

Grampa tells her the story of Pyramus and Thisbe, two lovers who would talk through a crack in the wall between their houses as their families hated each other. They kissed underneath a mulberry tree, signifying their eternal love. Inspired by this, Lisa asks Grampa to drive her and Nick to Mulberry Island by sunset so they can share a moment of eternal love, and he agrees, stealing his retirement home's shuttle van to drive them. However, he drops them off to make the rest of the journey when the police arrest him for stealing the van and the TV remote from the home.

Homer, Marge and Bart bail him out and catch up to Lisa and Nick just as they begin rowing their boat through the river to the tree. Marge uses water shoes to skate across the river, making it to the Mulberry tree where Lisa and Nick are having second thoughts about committing to a relationship and decide to break up instead, doubting that they could devote the rest of their lives to one another. Also, Nick reveals he is not very brave and exciting as he led Lisa to believe as he only pretended to be brave so Lisa could like him. Marge comforts Lisa when she tells her the moment she wanted, and then kisses her under the Mulberry tree to remind her of their own eternal mother-daughter love.

Meanwhile, Bart and Milhouse are inspired by the show MythCrackers to debunk some urban schoolyard legends. At first, the students are fascinated by the myth debunking. However, this eventually works out too well and the students are left disappointed by the lack of interesting myths in school. So Bart and Milhouse come up with a way to make school fun again by creating a myth where Groundskeeper Willie is a werewolf.

== Production ==
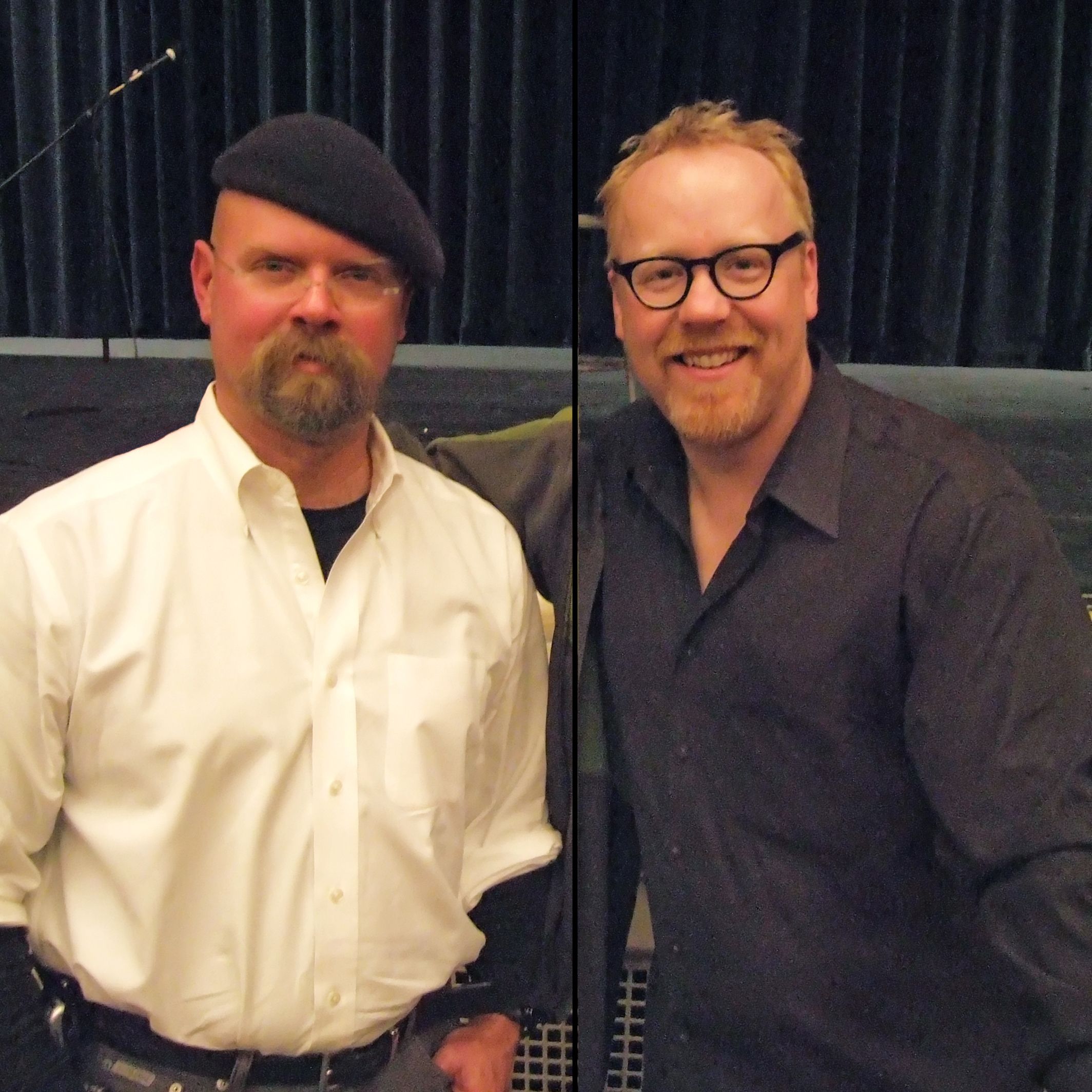
The hosts of MythBusters, Jamie Hyneman (left) and Adam Savage, guest starred in the episode.

The episode was written by Rob LaZebnik. It parodies the Discovery Channel program MythBusters, in which hosts and special effects experts Adam Savage and Jamie Hyneman test the validity of different myths. Both Savage and Hyneman guest starred in the episode as themselves, hosting the MythCrackers program that Bart and Milhouse watch. Canadian actor Michael Cera guest starred in the episode as the voice of Nick. Executive producer Al Jean described the character as a boy who charms Lisa, but she realizes that he is less than expected.

Franz von Suppé's overture Light Cavalry Overture is featured in the episode, and according to The Simpsons music editor Chris Ledesma, "I got to spend the afternoon editing and choosing just the right bars to use in the montage so the parts that [showrunner] Al Jean wants to hear are in the shots while also maintaining the right tempo and 'hitting' the right moments."

"The Daughter Also Rises" revealed the origins of the Scottish character Groundskeeper Willie, which had previously been the matter of a debate between Glasgow and Aberdeen, with people of both cities claiming that they live in the hometown of Willie. However, "The Daughter Also Rises" revealed that the character is actually from Kirkwall.

== Reception ==
The episode originally aired on the Fox network in the United States on February 12, 2012. It was watched by approximately 4.26 million people during this broadcast, and in the demographic for adults aged 18–49, it received a 2.0 Nielsen rating and a five percent share. The rating was a seventeen percent decrease from the previous episode the aired two weeks earlier, making this the lowest-rated episode so far of the season. However, "The Daughter Also Rises" faced strong competition from the highly rated 54th Grammy Awards, which increased its rating by forty-one percent from the previous year's awards as a result of Whitney Houston's death on February 11. The episode became the second highest-rated broadcast in Fox's Animation Domination lineup for the night in terms of both total viewers and adults aged 18–49, finishing higher than new episodes of Napoleon Dynamite, American Dad!, and The Cleveland Show, but lower than a new Family Guy episode.

Hayden Childs of The A.V. Club called the episode "mediocre" and "lackluster," criticizing the lack of humor. He also wrote that the "worst crime of the episode appears to be a case of the guest star wagging the dog, with the show working so hard to make Lisa’s love interest a Michael Cera type that they forgot to give Michael Cera much to do in the way of acting or comedy."

Teresa Lopez of TV Fanatic gave the episode 3.5 out of 5 stars. She liked watching Lisa with her crush but felt it was somewhat out of character. She thought the MythBusters subplot was just a way to seem up to date.
