= Crash Test World =

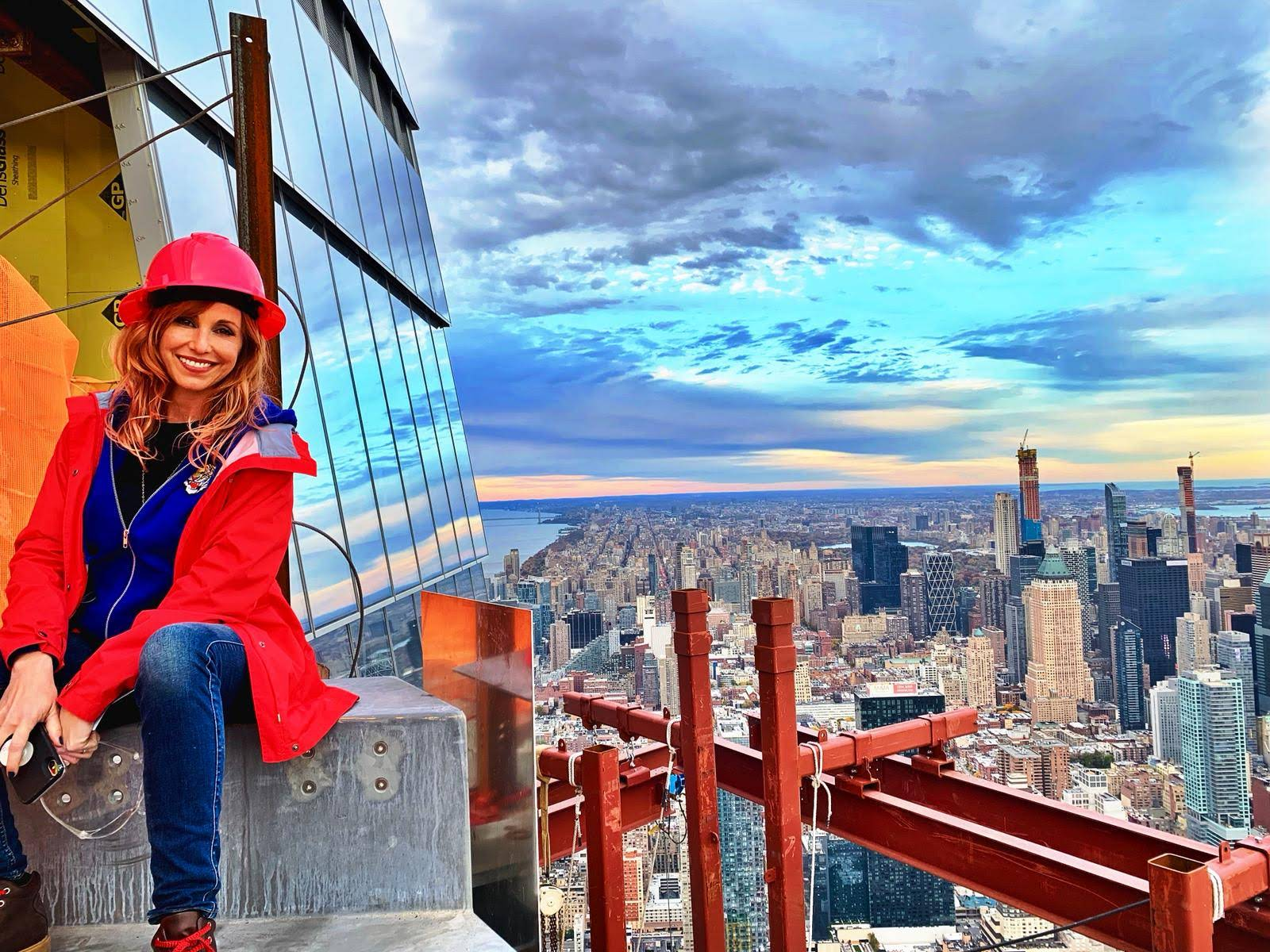
- Kari Byron on location filming the New York City episode of Crash Test World
- Genre: Education
- Created by: Jenny Buccos
- Presented by: Kari Byron
- Country of origin: United States
- Original language: English
- No. of seasons: 1
- No. of episodes: 6

Production
- Executive producers: Jenny Buccos; Andrew Zimmern
- Producer: Intuitive Content
- Running time: 30 minutes
- Production company: ProjectExplorer

Original release
- Network: Science Channel
- Release: January 8, 2021

Crash Test World is a television program from ProjectExplorer starring former MythBusters host Kari Byron. It premiered on October 14, 2019, in Brooklyn, New York, and online via 5-minute excerpts. On February 20, 2020, ProjectExplorer announced that Escapade Media had sold the rights for the program in the United States and Canada to Discovery Channel. On December 22, 2020 Science Channel announced that Crash Test World would become available on January 8, 2021.

== Episodes ==
The first six episodes in Season 1 were filmed in locations around the world including Israel, Qatar, New York, Silicon Valley, and Berlin.

Overview of Crash Test World episodes
Episode name	Release date	Description
Tech for Good / How is technology improving our lives?	January 7, 2021	Kari visits one of the United States' top tech capitals and meets with students, rescue workers and a startup-tech company to demonstrate their groundbreaking technologies. Kari discovers how so much of this technology is bringing people together.
Berlin, Germany / Do walls work?	January 7, 2021	Kari dives into the ongoing urban experiment known as Berlin and discovers that what was once the most defining feature of the city, the Berlin Wall, has given way to an entirely unique open, urban experience of art, culture and immigration.
Feed the World / How do we better feed our growing planet?	January 14, 2021	How will the growing world be fed? Kari meets with business owners and community leaders in San Francisco and Detroit to learn about alternative and sustainable proteins and the importance that honey bees have on the environment.
Israel / How do we live together peacefully?	January 14, 2021	Kari visits communities across Israel and discovers that there are many ways to achieve peaceful coexistence: whether through curiosity of technology, sharing food and cuisine or enjoying sporting activities together.
Doha, Qatar	January 21, 2021	Kari ventures to Doha, Qatar, on the Arabian Peninsula to discover how people rely on centuries-old customs and modern technology to grow food, find water and keep cool all while living in the desert.
New York City / How do we make mega-cities more livable?	January 21, 2021	With more than half of the world's population in cities, functions like transportation and waste management are a major challenge. Kari visits New York City, where urban planners, developers and kids in the Bronx work to make their city more livable.
