= Headrush =

Headrush may refer to:

- Headrush (film), a 2003 Irish film starring Steven Berkoff
- Head Rush (TV series), a 2010 Discovery show
- Headrush EP, by the band Creaming Jesus
- HeadRush, a spinoff of the PC CD-ROM game You Don't Know Jack
- "Headrush", a song on the 2015 album Walk the Plank by Zebrahead
- "Headrush", a song on the 2018 album What Happens Next by Joe Satriani
- Headrush, name of the line of guitar effects processing products from the company inMusic Brands
- Orthostatic hypotension, a sudden drop in blood pressure and coordination when a person stands up too quickly
- Vertigo (medical), a medical symptom of a balance disorder
