= Kari Byron =

American television host and artist (born 1974)

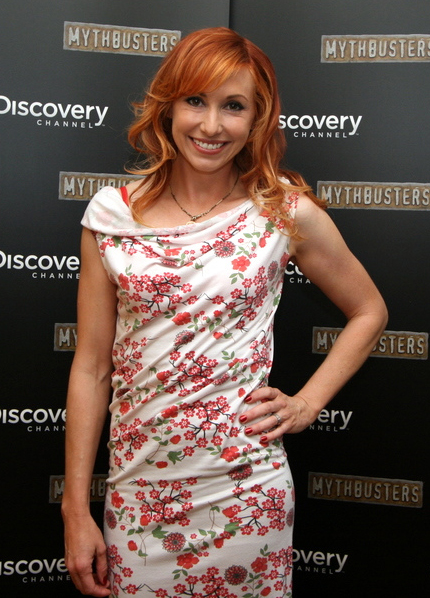
- Byron in 2010
- Born: Kari Elizabeth Byron; December 18, 1974 (age 51); Santa Clara County, California, U.S.
- Education: San Francisco State University
- Occupation: Television host
- Years active: 2003–present
- Television: MythBusters (2003–2014); Head Rush (2010–2011); White Rabbit Project (2016); Crash Test World (2021)
- Spouse: Paul Urich (m. 2006; div. 2020)
- Children: 1

Kari Elizabeth Byron (born December 18, 1974) is an American television host, best known for her role on MythBusters on the Discovery Channel and on the Netflix series White Rabbit Project.

Byron was born in the San Francisco Bay Area in California and graduated from San Francisco State University in 1998 with a Bachelor of Arts in film and sculpture. Byron was a cast member of MythBusters from 2005 to 2014 where she was part of "The Build Team". From 2010 to 2011, Byron hosted Head Rush, aimed at science education and teens, and Large, Dangerous Rocket Ships. From 2011 to 2014, she presented Punkin Chunkin on the Science Channel. She co-hosted Netflix's White Rabbit Project in 2016 and was the presenter of Crash Test World. Byron is also the co-founder of EXPLR Media, an education streaming service. Outside of television, Byron is an artist and author. She wrote a memoir titled Crash Test Girl in 2018.

== Early life ==
Byron was born in the San Francisco Bay Area in California. She graduated from Los Gatos High School in Los Gatos, California, and studied at San Francisco State University, graduating in May 1998 with a Bachelor of Arts in film and sculpture. She spent the following year backpacking, primarily in South Asia, and was involved in a number of art projects.

== Career ==
=== MythBusters ===
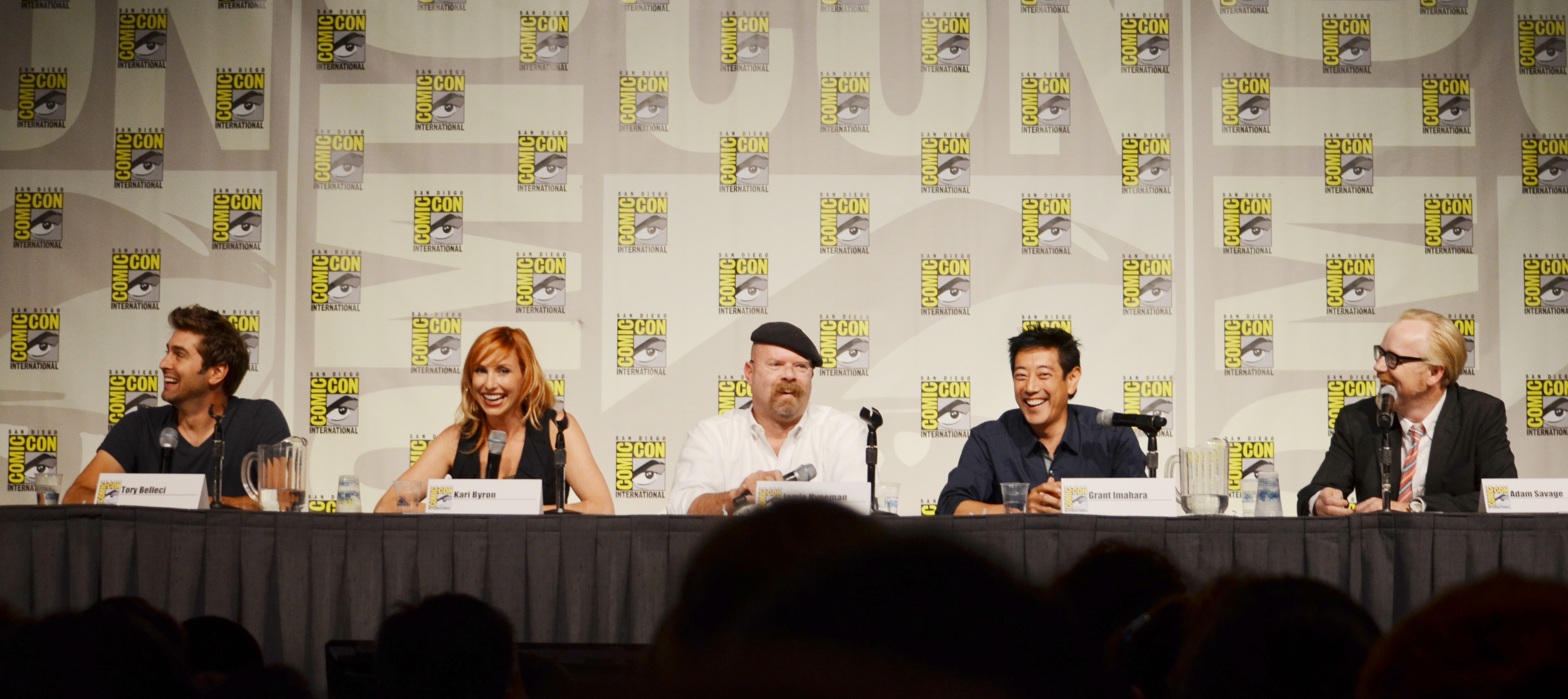
MythBusters Tory Belleci, Byron, Jamie Hyneman, Grant Imahara, and Adam Savage in 2012

Byron was a cast member on MythBusters from 2004 to 2014. Along with fellow cast members Tory Belleci and Grant Imahara she was part of what is commonly referred to as "The Build Team" or B Team. This Build Team worked with Adam Savage and Jamie Hyneman to test the plausibility of various myths throughout their tenure with the show. She and the others also hosted their own segments. She became involved in the show after persistently showing up at Hyneman's M5 Industries workshop in a desire to get hired by his company. She and the other Build Team members were given a more prominent role beginning with the show's second season. Not having had a long history in show business, Byron at first found it difficult to act naturally with this more visible position but gradually became more accustomed to it.

During the second half of the 2009 season, Byron was on maternity leave and was temporarily replaced by Jessi Combs. From 2010 to 2011, Byron had her own show, Head Rush, on the Science Channel, geared toward science education and teens.

Byron also hosted the 2010 and 2011 editions of Large, Dangerous Rocket Ships for the Science Channel. She and Belleci made a guest appearance on the October 3, 2012, episode of the Discovery series Sons of Guns. They test-fired some of the weapons in the Red Jacket shop and watched as the staff re-tested a myth previously busted by the Build Team: that a propane tank could explode if struck by a bullet. She left the show in 2014.

Byron and Belleci hosted coverage of Punkin Chunkin on the Science Channel from 2011 to 2014. In 2015, Byron and Belleci hosted Thrill Factor, a new show for the Travel Channel.

Looking back on her time on MythBusters, she says that she made lifelong connections with the cast and crew. Specifically, she said, "I made family with these people, I take them everywhere I go."

=== White Rabbit Project ===
Byron, along with Imahara and Belleci, hosted the Netflix production White Rabbit Project, released on Netflix on December 9, 2016. The series focused on unusual aspects from history and pop culture.

=== Crash Test World ===
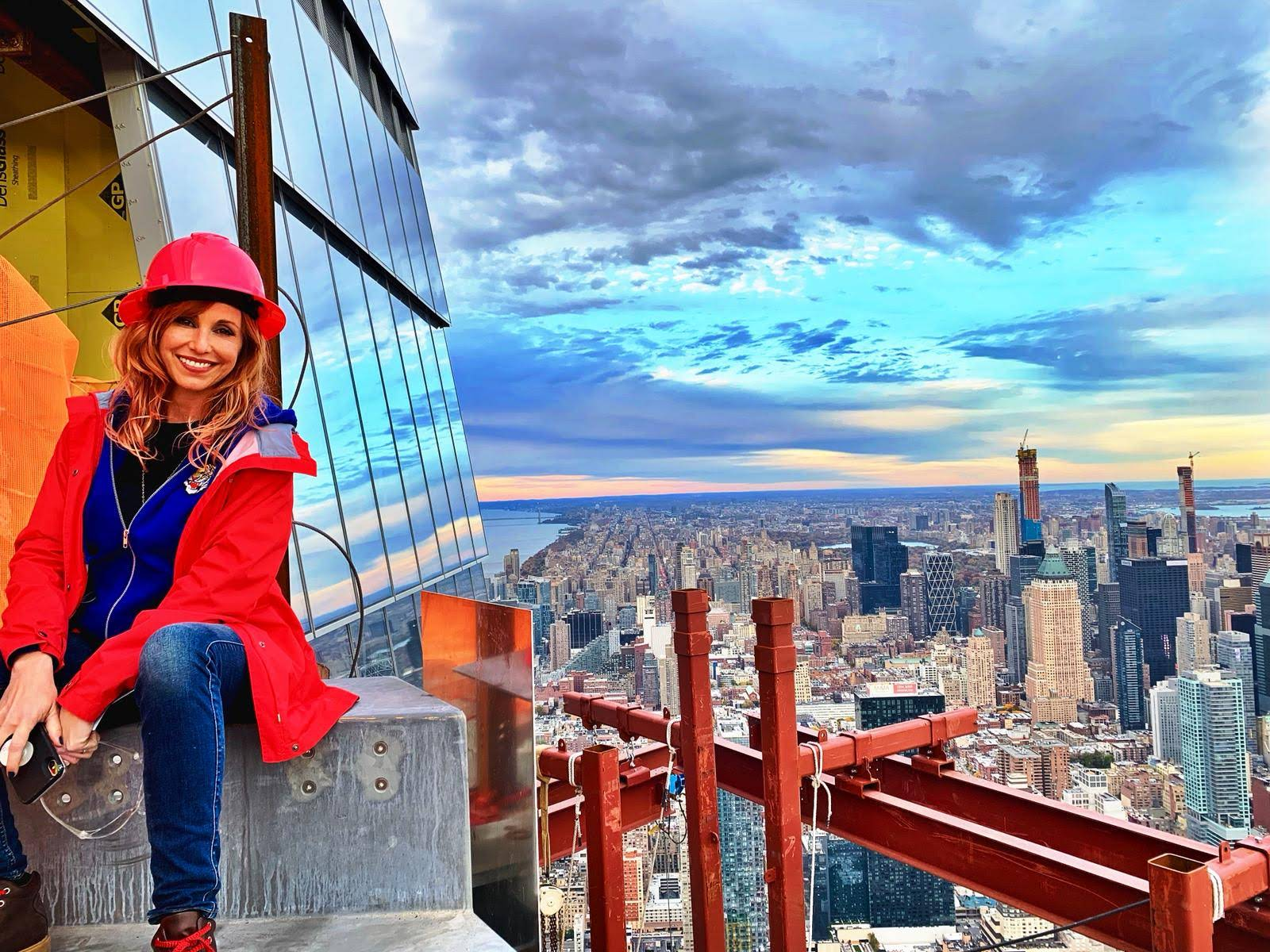
Byron during filming for Crash Test World in Hudson Yards, Manhattan

Byron became host of the series Crash Test World. The six-episode series aired on Science Channel starting January 8, 2021.

=== EXPLR Media ===
Byron is currently the co-founder of EXPLR Media, an education streaming service. At a Future of Education Technology Conference in 2022, Byron stated about EXPLR Media, "Many women I know in STEM who are trying to pitch shows are constantly told the voice of a woman is not trusted in science television. And we're talking about successful hosts. How do we show them who they can be? …I want our audience to be able to look at every show that we do and find somebody that looks like them."

=== Mythfits ===
In June 2025, Byron, with Belleci as a co-host, started the Mythfits podcast.

== Personal life ==
Byron married artist Paul Urich in March 2006. They have a daughter, born in 2009. On June 26, 2019, Byron petitioned for separation from Urich and their marriage was dissolved on March 20, 2020.

She was previously a vegetarian, later identified as a pescatarian in a 2011 interview, and in a 2025 episode of the Mythfits Podcast revealed that she now eats meat.

Byron continues to create art, including paintings created by igniting gunpowder. In 2018 she published a memoir Crash Test Girl, with HarperOne. Byron is credited with creating the original cover art, and providing interior art, for canvas: poems (Viewless Wings Press, 2021), using the black powder technique.

In Crash Test Girl, Byron states she has "contended with severe bouts of depression" since she was twelve. She states she has depressive episodes "a few times a year"; in addition, she had postpartum depression, more severe than her normal depression, for six months after her daughter was born.
