= Deadblow =

Combat robot from the BattleBots television series

Deadblow (1999)
- Grant with Deadblow, 1999

Details
- Made by: Grant Imahara
- Name: Deadblow
- Year of manufacture: 1999
- Series: BattleBots
- Type/Class: Middleweight
- Propulsion: Electric
- Weapon: Air powered hammer
- Weapon details: 3/8" solid titanium - 1500 psi
- Control system: 1 R/C unit

Competition results
- Years active: 1999–2002
- Tournament wins: 0
- Special wins: 2 Rumble wins
- Win/lose record: 7/6
- Ranking: 2

Dimensions

Construction
- Material: 6061-T6 aluminium
- Propulsion: 2x 12V DC wheelchair motors

Deadblow is a combat robot that was built and driven by Grant Imahara. It competed on BattleBots in the middleweight division using a fast pneumatic hammer as its weapon. Deadblow won two rumbles and was ranked second among middleweights, after Hazard. Afterwards, it was used by Imahara to help in some experiments on the television series MythBusters.

== Use on MythBusters ==
After Imahara joined MythBusters in 2005, Deadblow was used on the show several times, though often with other attachments besides its original titanium hammer. Its debut came in "Bottle Rocket Blast-Off", when Imahara demonstrated it – while its accomplishments were reeled off with accompanying footage – before using the pneumatic system that normally powered the hammer to test the pressure rating of a soda bottle. Its most notable use came in 2009 in "Driving in the Dark", which saw Imahara, Tory Belleci and temporary Build Team member Jessi Combs testing the myth that smugglers can beat checkpoints at the Canada–US border by turning off their headlights while not crashing or navigating wrongly due to lack of light. To simulate an oncoming car with its headlights ablaze, Imahara fastened halogen lamps to Deadblow, earning it the nickname of "Blinky", and drove it towards Belleci, who was playing the role of a smuggler in a go-kart with its headlights off, causing him to veer and crash into the tire wall. Its other uses on the show include the "Beat the Guard Dog" myth where it played the part of a robotically controlled cat; Imahara modified it to mount a taxidermied cat and make the cat's joints hang loosely.

The robot currently resides in Imahara's personal workshop following his death.

== See also ==
- List of MythBusters cast members
