= The Explosion Show =

- Written by: Dan Riley
- Presented by: Tory Belleci; Tommy Passemante
- Starring: Tory Belleci; Tommy Passemante
- Country of origin: United States
- Original language: English
- No. of seasons: 1
- No. of episodes: 6

Production
- Executive producers: Jeff Tremaine; Rob Dyrdek; Shanna Zablow Newton; Mike Odair; Shane Nickerson; Wyatt Channell
- Cinematography: Tyler Whitbread
- Editors: Rob Eigen; Sascha Stanton Craven

Original release
- Network: Science Channel
- Release: January 1 – February 5, 2020

The Explosion Show is a television series that premiered on the Science Channel in January 2020.

== Episodes ==
No.	Title	Original release date	U.S viewers (millions)
1	"When Mountains Explode"	January 1, 2020	N/A
2	"FBI Bomb Squad"	January 8, 2020	N/A
3	"Fireworks Declassified"	January 15, 2020	N/A
4	"Fighting Fire with Fire"	January 22, 2020	N/A
5	"Blowing Up Hollywood"	January 29, 2020	N/A
6	"Black Powder Blast"	February 5, 2020	N/A

== See also ==
- 2020 in American television
