= Unchained Reaction =

Television series

- Genre: Reality; Science
- Created by: Adam Savage and Jamie Hyneman
- Starring: Adam Savage; Jamie Hyneman; Charles Haine
- Country of origin: United States
- Original language: English
- No. of seasons: 1
- No. of episodes: 6

Production
- Executive producers: Adam Savage; Jamie Hyneman; Daniel Soiseth; Lloyd Braun; Gail Berman; Gene Stein; David Pritikin; Tracy Rudolph
- Production companies: Discovery Studios; BermanBraun

Original release
- Network: Discovery Channel
- Release: March 18 – May 3, 2012

Unchained Reaction is a science and engineering reality game show that aired on the Discovery Channel. It was judged and executive-produced by Adam Savage and Jamie Hyneman, best known for hosting the science entertainment series MythBusters.

The series premiered on March 18, 2012. The show pits two teams of various backgrounds against each other to build an elaborate chain reaction contraption (sometimes also referred to as a "Rube Goldberg" machine or device). Teams are provided with identical sets of tools and materials and are given five days to construct a series of mechanisms based on a predetermined theme. Midway through each week, the teams are provided with a surprise "missing link" item that they must add to the middle of their machines. The winner would be selected by Savage, Hyneman, and a guest judge.

== History ==
Discovery Channel announced Unchained Reaction, described by Savage as his "super secret project", on January 20, 2012. In the announcement, Savage said he and Hyneman wanted to create a show "that puts the process of problem-solving and ingenuity front and center".

The series was produced by Discovery Studios and BermanBraun (Gail Berman and Lloyd Braun). The first and only season consisted of six episodes.

== Episodes ==
No.	Title	Guest judge	Original release date
1	"Heavy vs. Light"	Adrian Hightower	March 18, 2012
2	"Fire and Ice"	Adam Sadowsky	March 25, 2012
3	"Speed"	W. Daniel Hillis	April 1, 2012
4	"Take Flight"	Bruce Gray	April 8, 2012
5	"Jack of All Trades"	Julia Greer	April 15, 2012
6	"Movie Mayhem"	Rick Baker	May 3, 2012
