= White Rabbit Project (TV series) =

Netflix series

- Genre: Science investigation
- Presented by: Kari Byron; Tory Belleci; Grant Imahara
- Country of origin: United States
- No. of seasons: 1
- No. of episodes: 10

Production
- Executive producers: John Luscombe; Ryan Senter; Martyn Ives
- Running time: 45–48 minutes
- Production company: Beyond Productions

Original release
- Network: Netflix
- Release: December 9, 2016

White Rabbit Project is a Netflix series starring Kari Byron, Tory Belleci, and Grant Imahara, the build team from MythBusters, that was released on December 9, 2016. According to the official synopsis, the team investigates topics such as "jailbreaks, superpower technology, heists, and crazy World War II weapons", which they will explore through experiments, builds, and tests. Despite positive reception, the series was cancelled by Netflix after one season.

== Production ==
The show was first announced at DragonCon 2016. The show is produced by John Luscombe, Ryan Senter, and Martyn Ives, who are from Beyond Productions, the production company for Mythbusters. A trailer was released for the series on November 29, 2016.

== Episodes ==
No.	Title	Original release date
1	"Super Power Tech"	December 9, 2016
The team tests the viability of various superpowers such as mind control and human flight.
2	"Jailbreak"	December 9, 2016
The team compares different prison breaks including the escape of Pascal Payet and El Chapo; Tory replicates the escape of the Strelzyk and Wetzel families, who on September 16, 1979, escaped from East Germany to West Germany in a homemade hot air balloon
3	"Crazy WW2 Weapons"	December 9, 2016
The trio explore experimental weapons in World War 2, including bombs attached to bats and feeding Adolf Hitler estrogen. Kari tries to build a jet propulsion platform meant to allow for the rapid airdrop of heavy weapons.
4	"Scam Artists"	December 9, 2016
The team talk about a number of famous Scam Artists such as Victor Lustig AKA the man who sold the Eiffel Tower twice and the man who created the ponzi scheme.
5	"Heist!"	December 9, 2016
The team talk about a number of famous heists, including the Hatton Garden safe deposit burglary.
6	"May G Force Be with You"	December 9, 2016
The hosts measure g-forces in various contexts to find the most extreme, measuring g forces experienced from jousting to roller coasters to race cars.
7	"Tech We Love to Hate"	December 9, 2016
The team find the most annoying tech between, machine voice interaction, repeated stop lights in cities, drones, printers constantly failing, and the constant nagging of too smart tech.
8	"Where's My Hoverboard?"	December 9, 2016
The team investigates the promised tech of the past, including hoverboards, jet packs, holograms, X-ray glasses, bionic body parts, and dermal regeneration.
9	"Invented Before Its Time?"	December 9, 2016
Was the tech we have today invented long before its assumed creation? The hosts investigate proposed precursors of the mobile phone, GIF, car navigation, the portable music player, selfie stick, and music streaming services.
10	"Speed Freaks"	December 9, 2016
Exceptional feats of speed. The hosts look at the speed of RC cars, speed skiing, fastest human, electric car, speed skydiving, and the SR-71 Blackbird spy plane.
