= ProjectExplorer =

ProjectExplorer is a documentary short film series. The films, directed and produced by ProjectExplorer's Founder, Jenny M Buccos, focus on histories and cultures of foreign places and people using interviews with subject experts, artists, and public figures including Archbishop Desmond Tutu, Dr. John Kani, Greg Marinovich, and Sipho “Hotstix” Mabuse. Produced for a child and young adult audience, segments in each series depict everyday life and the challenges and concerns of those living in the locations and regions featured. Each film is 2–4 minutes in length, with each series containing approximately 40 films.

The ProjectExplorer series is distributed internationally without charge via the web by ProjectExplorer, LTD. an American not-for-profit organization.

Three series have been produced and distributed.

In fall 2009, ProjectExplorer's third series, Jordan, received a GOLD level Parents' Choice Award for excellence in web programming.

== Film series ==
=== Shakespeare's England (2006) ===
The first series was filmed in London, Stratford-upon-Avon, and New York City. The series includes more than 30 film segments.

United Kingdom locations and individuals include:

- The London Eye
- The Tower of London
- The Whitechapel Bell Foundry, which demonstrates the process of making a bell
- Simon Hughes, Member of Parliament and President of the Liberal Democrats
- The Old Vic
- The Royal Shakespeare Company
- The National Archives (UK)

Segments filmed in New York City include:

- Michael Cumpsty discusses and performs monologues from Hamlet (while starring in the Classic Stage Company production)
- Michael Stuhlbarg discusses and performs a monologue from Macbeth

=== South Africa (2007) ===
Filmed in Johannesburg, Cape Town, and KwaZulu Natal, the series contains over 40 film segments including:

- Ntate Thabong Phosa, a lesiba player from Lesotho. Due to the rarity of lesiba players globally, this is one of the only publicly available examples of the lesiba played on film.
- A Robben Island piece, filmed at the cell in which Nelson Mandela was held for 18 of his 27-year imprisonment.
- JSE Securities Exchange with Leigh Roberts, correspondent for CNBC Africa.
- A 3-part series on HIV/AIDS with amfAR Director of Research, Dr. Rowena Johnson. Dr. Johnson discusses high cost of anti-retroviral drugs and testing in South Africa.
- The June 16, 1976 Soweto Uprising, with archival film footage and photography from SABC and The Sowetan newspaper.

Prominent South Africans featured in the series:

- Dr. John Kani, Chairperson of the Apartheid Museum and TONY Award Winning Actor
- Musician Sipho “Hotstix” Mabuse
- Former U.N. Ambassador Dave A. Steward, Executive Director of the FW de Klerk Foundation
- Director and producer, Duma Ndlovu
- Malcolm Purkey, Artistic Director of the Market Theatre

=== South Africa, Part II (2008) ===
Filmed in Johannesburg, Cape Town, and New York City, the series contains over 10 film segments.

Prominent South Africans featured in the series:

- Archbishop Desmond Tutu, Nobel Peace Prize laureate
- Photojournalist Greg Marinovich, Pulitzer Prize winner and co-author of The Bang-Bang Club
- Vusi Mahlasela, musician
- Author, Max du Preez

=== Jordan (2008) ===
Filmed in Amman, Petra, Umm Qais, Jerash, Madaba, Bethany, the Dead Sea, and New York City, the series contains more than 45 film segments.

Jordan series segments include:

- A tour of the throne room of King Abdullah II, at Raghadan Palace
- Sharing mansaf with a Bedouin family in the Wadi Rum desert
- The UNRWA Jabal Hussein refugee camp
- The Siq, Treasury, and Monastery at Petra
- The ruins of Gadara at Umm Qais
- Jerash, the capital and largest city of Jordan's Jerash Governorate
- Madaba, home of the Madaba Map and the mosaic capital of Jordan
- The archaeological site at Bethany
- Traditional clothing from Salt and Ma'an
- The reintroduction into the wild of the endangered Arabian Oryx
- The Desert Castles
- The science of the Dead Sea
- Her Royal Highness Princess Basma bint Ali and her Royal Botanic Garden
