= Jamie Hyneman =

American TV host (born 1956)

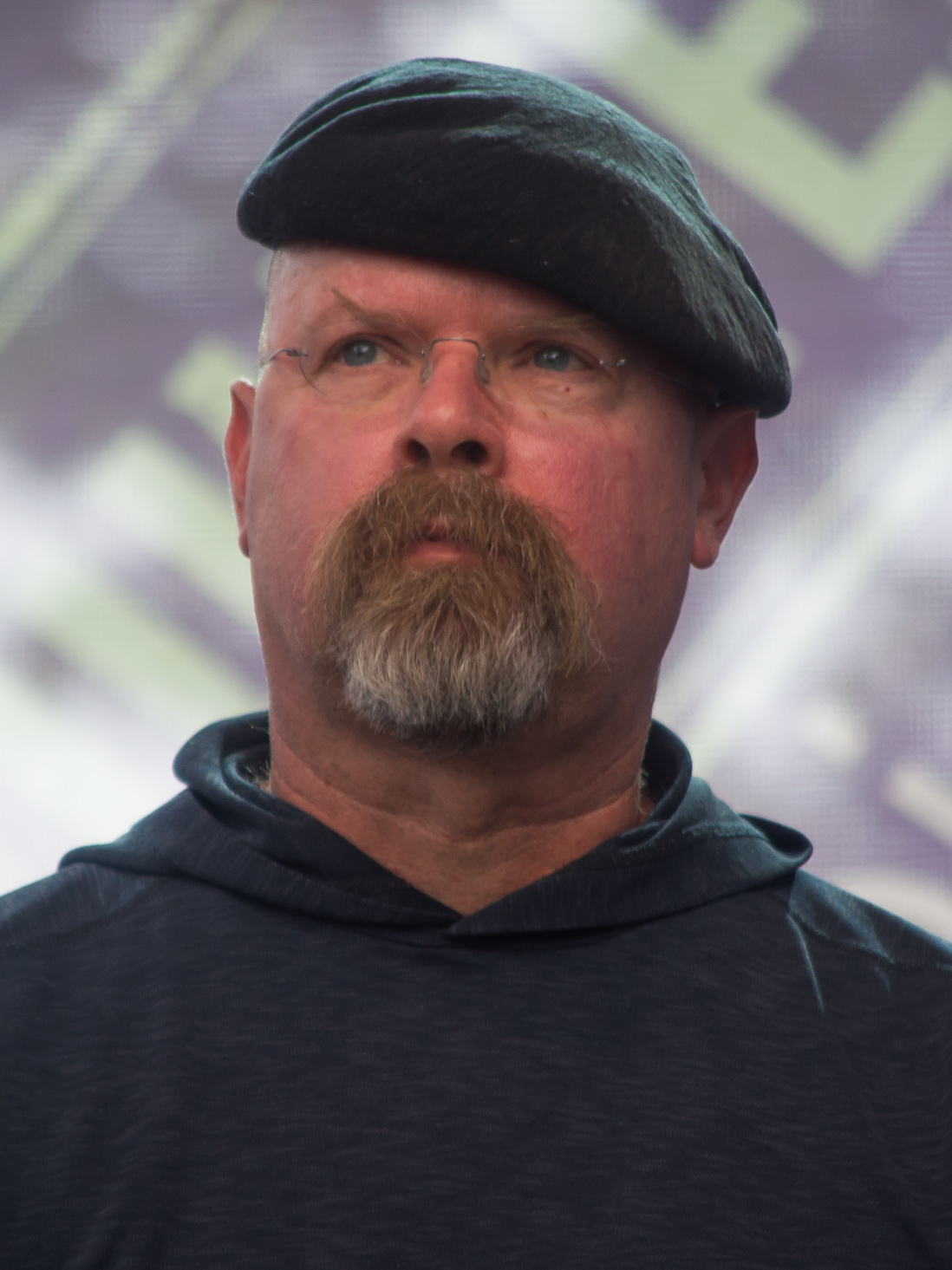
- Hyneman in 2016
- Born: James Franklin Hyneman; September 25, 1956 (age 70); Marshall, Michigan, U.S.
- Education: Indiana University
- Occupations: CEO, M5 Industries
- Years active: 1985–present
- Spouse: Eileen Walsh (m. 1989)
- Website: m5industries.com

James Franklin Hyneman (/ˈhaɪnəmən/; born September 25, 1956) is an American special effects expert who was co-host of the television series MythBusters alongside Adam Savage, where he became known for his distinctive beret, rimless glasses and walrus moustache. He is also the owner of M5 Industries, the special effects workshop where MythBusters was filmed.

He was an early competitor in Robot Wars, but his robot Blendo was deemed too dangerous for competition. He is the inventor of the Sentry, an unmanned firefighting robotic vehicle. He is also one of the designers of the aerial cable robotic camera system Wavecam used in sports and entertainment events.

== Early life and education ==
Hyneman was born James Franklin Hyneman in Marshall, Michigan, to Franklin K. (1929–2016) and Betty Jo (née Calender; 1930–1972) Hyneman, and grew up on a farm in Columbus, Indiana. He had one older sister named Susan (1954–2024). He said, "I was a problematic kid, to be sure. I left home when I was 14 and hitchhiked all over the country." As a child, Hyneman spent time at Indiana University, where his mother was a graduate librarian. At age fifteen, he owned a pet store in a shopping mall in Columbus. Hyneman graduated from Columbus North High School in 1974.

In 1982, Hyneman earned a degree in Russian linguistics from Indiana University Bloomington.

== Career ==
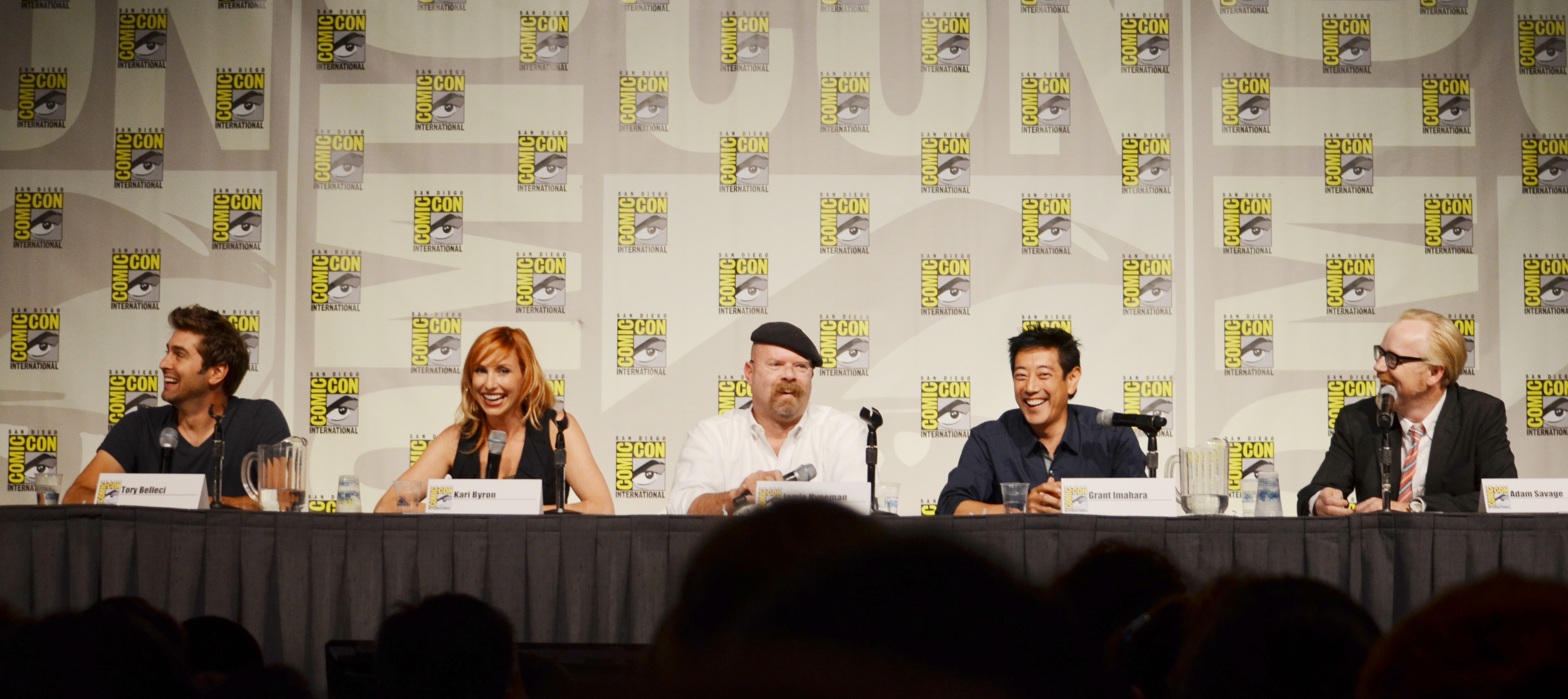
MythBusters Tory Belleci, Kari Byron, Hyneman, Grant Imahara, and Adam Savage in 2012

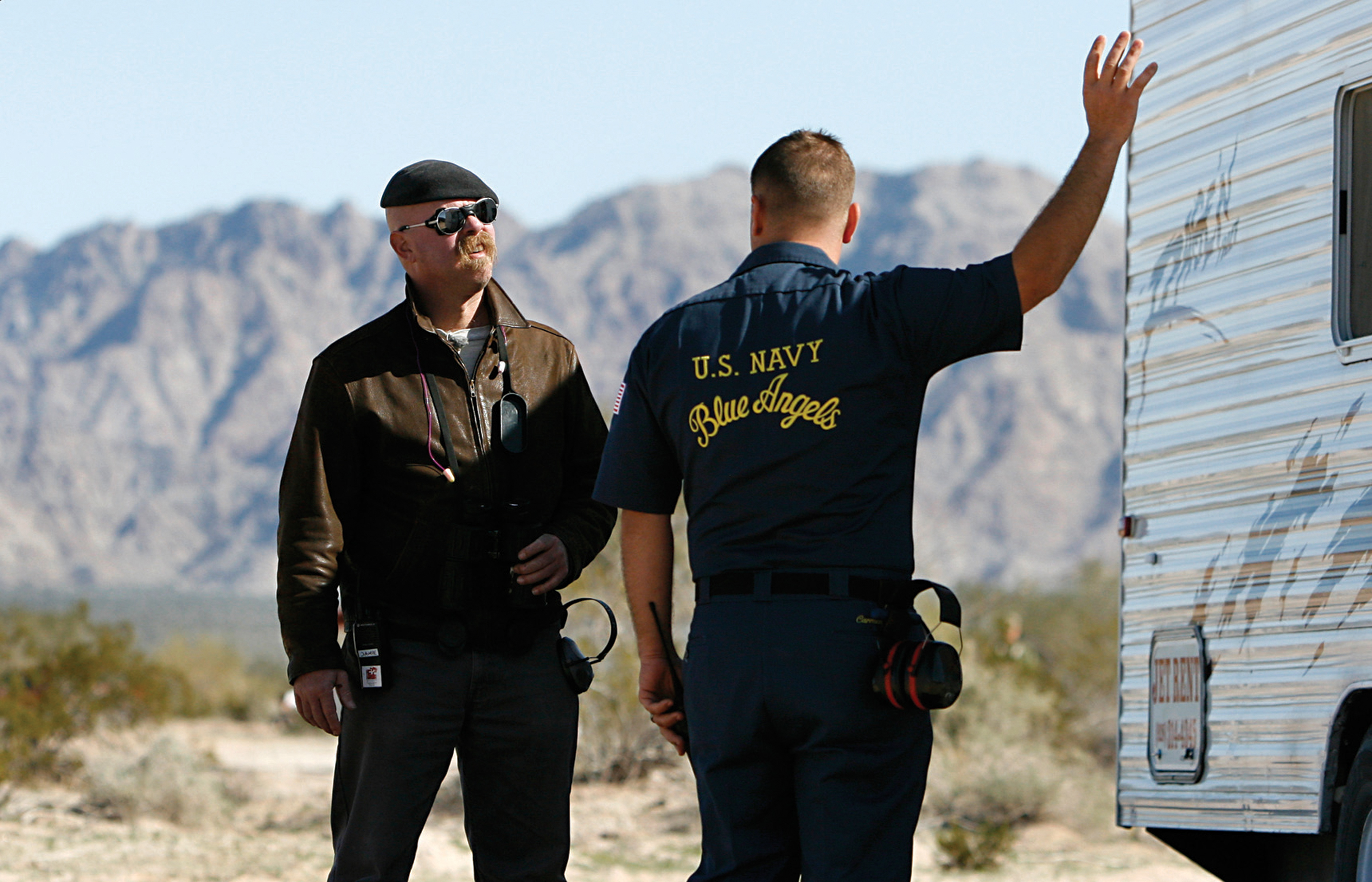
Hyneman and a Blue Angels team member at Marine Corps Air Station Yuma prepare for the Sonic Boom Sound-off episode in 2009.

Hyneman has worked as a boat captain, certified divemaster, wilderness survival expert, linguist, pet store owner, animal wrangler, machinist, concrete inspector, and chef. He co-hosted MythBusters from 2003 to 2016.

=== Special effects work ===
Hyneman owns the special effects company M5 Industries in San Francisco. Some of his achievements in commercials include the can-spitting vending machine seen in 7 Up commercials, and his patented two-wheeled football shoe from Nike Lab commercials.

=== Other appearances ===
Hyneman and Adam Savage portray two army junk-sellers in the film The Darwin Awards. They appear during the story of the rocket-car, which they partially reproduced previously in the MythBusters series's pilot episode and retested twice more.

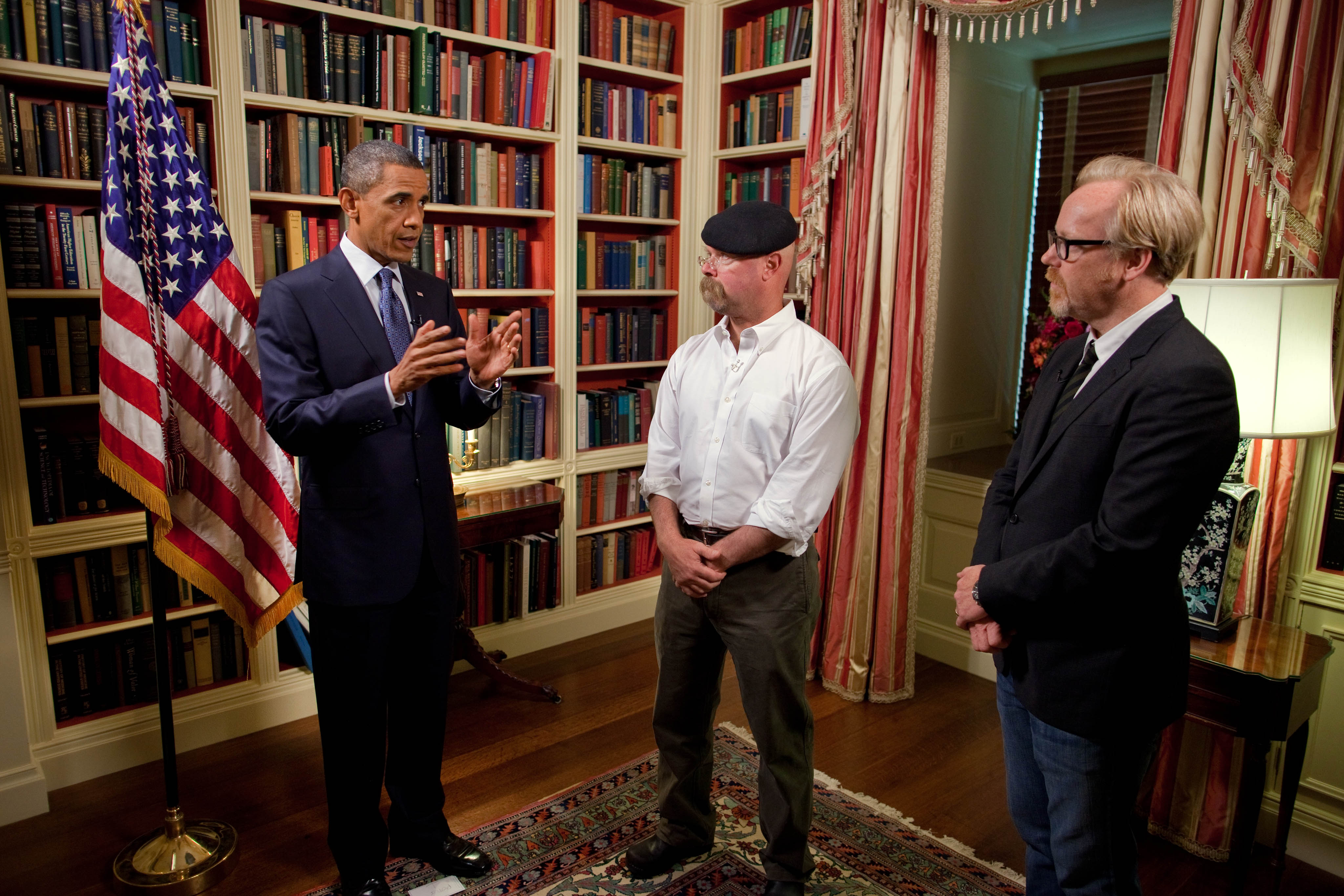
President Barack Obama meets with Hyneman and Adam Savage in the White House Library on July 27, 2010.

Hyneman made a cameo appearance along with Savage on CSI: Crime Scene Investigation on the May 1, 2008 episode "The Theory of Everything", where they play inspectors giving thumbs-up after seeing a shirt soaked in pepper spray catch fire when shot by a taser. They tested this myth on MythBusters and declared it confirmed with certain types of pepper spray.

He and Savage executive produced and appeared as judges on the game show Unchained Reaction, which premiered in March 2012. The two also voiced characters on The Simpsons episode "The Daughter Also Rises" as a parody of themselves, the "MythCrackers", which prompts Bart and Milhouse to experiment in a similar fashion. Both Hyneman and Savage also voiced stormtroopers in the Phineas and Ferb: Star Wars special.

== Academic career ==
In November 2021, he was appointed professor of practice at LUT University in Lappeenranta, Finland, for a five-year term until November 2026, and gave his first lecture on prototypes on November 18, 2021.

=== Honorary degrees ===
He received an honorary Doctor of Engineering degree from Villanova University on May 16, 2010, and gave a commencement address. On November 25, 2011, Hyneman was awarded an honorary doctorate from the University of Twente for his role in the popularization of science and technology. In February 2017 he was named one of the fourteen new honorary doctors of technology by LUT University.

== Personal life ==
In 1984, Hyneman met science teacher Eileen Walsh when he owned a sailboat diving charter business in the Virgin Islands. Hyneman and Walsh married in 1989. Hyneman is an atheist. He has stated that while he has not been formally diagnosed, he suspects he displays characteristics of autism spectrum disorder.

== See also ==
- List of atheists in film, radio, television and theater
