= Head Rush (TV series) =

- Genre: Documentary; Science
- Created by: Peter Rees (MythBusters)
- Starring: Kari Byron
- Narrated by: Robert Lee
- Composer: Neil Sutherland
- Countries of origin: Australia; United States
- Original language: English
- No. of seasons: 2
- No. of episodes: 40

Production
- Camera setup: Multiple
- Running time: 60 minutes

Original release
- Network: Science Channel
- Release: August 23, 2010 – October 3, 2011

Related
- MythBusters

Head Rush (also billed as Head Rush Refresh in 2011) is a spin-off of the popular MythBusters show airing on Discovery's Science Channel since it debuted in 2010.

Described by Discovery as a "commercial free hour of MythBusters mashups, hosted by Kari Byron", the show features about ten minutes of new material—experiments and quizzes presented by Kari, as well as TV celebrity and scientist appearances, pitching the idea that "science is cool"—interwoven in fifty minutes of material from MythBusters episodes.

These celebrity segments include "Cool Jobs In Science", which has featured other Science, Discovery, and TLC stars such as Dr. Michio Kaku (Sci Fi Science), Cake Boss's Buddy Valastro, Dr. G: Medical Examiner's Dr. Jan Garavaglia, and each of the other four MythBusters.

== Episodes ==
=== Series overview ===
Season	Episodes	Originally released	
Season	Episodes	First released	Last released
1	30	August 23, 2010	October 1, 2010
2	10	August 26, 2011	October 3, 2011

=== Season 1 (2010) ===
No. overall	No. in season	Title	Original release date
1	1	"Exploding Drinking Glass"	August 23, 2010
2	2	"Leaf Blower Balancing"	August 24, 2010
3	3	"Ultimate Smoke Rings"	August 25, 2010
4	4	"Shrimps on Treadmills"	August 26, 2010
5	5	"Flaming Balancing Act"	August 27, 2010
6	6	"Water Bending Electrons"	August 30, 2010
7	7	"Liquid Nitrogen Balloon"	August 31, 2010
8	8	"Sauerkraut Clock"	September 1, 2010
9	9	"Spinning Light Show"	September 2, 2010
10	10	"Hot Balloon"	September 3, 2010
11	11	"Disappearing Glass"	September 6, 2010
12	12	"Strength of Salt"	September 7, 2010
13	13	"Bubble Power"	September 8, 2010
14	14	"Singing Glass"	September 9, 2010
15	15	"Burning Cash"	September 10, 2010
16	16	"Gas Powered Fountain"	September 13, 2010
17	17	"Test Tube Trickery"	September 14, 2010
18	18	"Monster Toothpaste"	September 15, 2010
19	19	"Bed of Nails"	September 16, 2010
20	20	"Human Conductors"	September 17, 2010
21	21	"Disappearing Water"	September 20, 2010
22	22	"Gravity Defying Fluid"	September 21, 2010
23	23	"Flaming Tornado"	September 22, 2010
24	24	"Fire Sandwich"	September 23, 2010
25	25	"Magnetic Boats"	September 24, 2010
26	26	"Gelatin Fiber Optics"	September 27, 2010
27	27	"Karate Challenge"	September 28, 2010
28	28	"Eggshell Physics"	September 29, 2010
29	29	"Super Wind Bags"	September 30, 2010
30	30	"Clouds in a Bottle"	October 1, 2010

=== Season 2: Refresh (2011) ===
No. overall	No. in season	Title	Original release date
31	1	"Grape Plasma"	August 26, 2011
32	2	"Candy Calories"	August 27, 2011
33	3	"Milk Kaleidoscope"	August 29, 2011
34	4	"Moody Crystals"	August 30, 2011
35	5	"Cornstarch Flamethrower"	September 6, 2011
36	6	"Smashing Physics"	September 9, 2011
37	7	"Gravity Fountain"	September 12, 2011
38	8	"Funnel Attraction"	September 19, 2011
39	9	"Synchronized Metronomes"	September 19, 2011
40	10	"FIRST Robotics"	October 3, 2011
