= Tory Belleci =

American television host (born 1970)

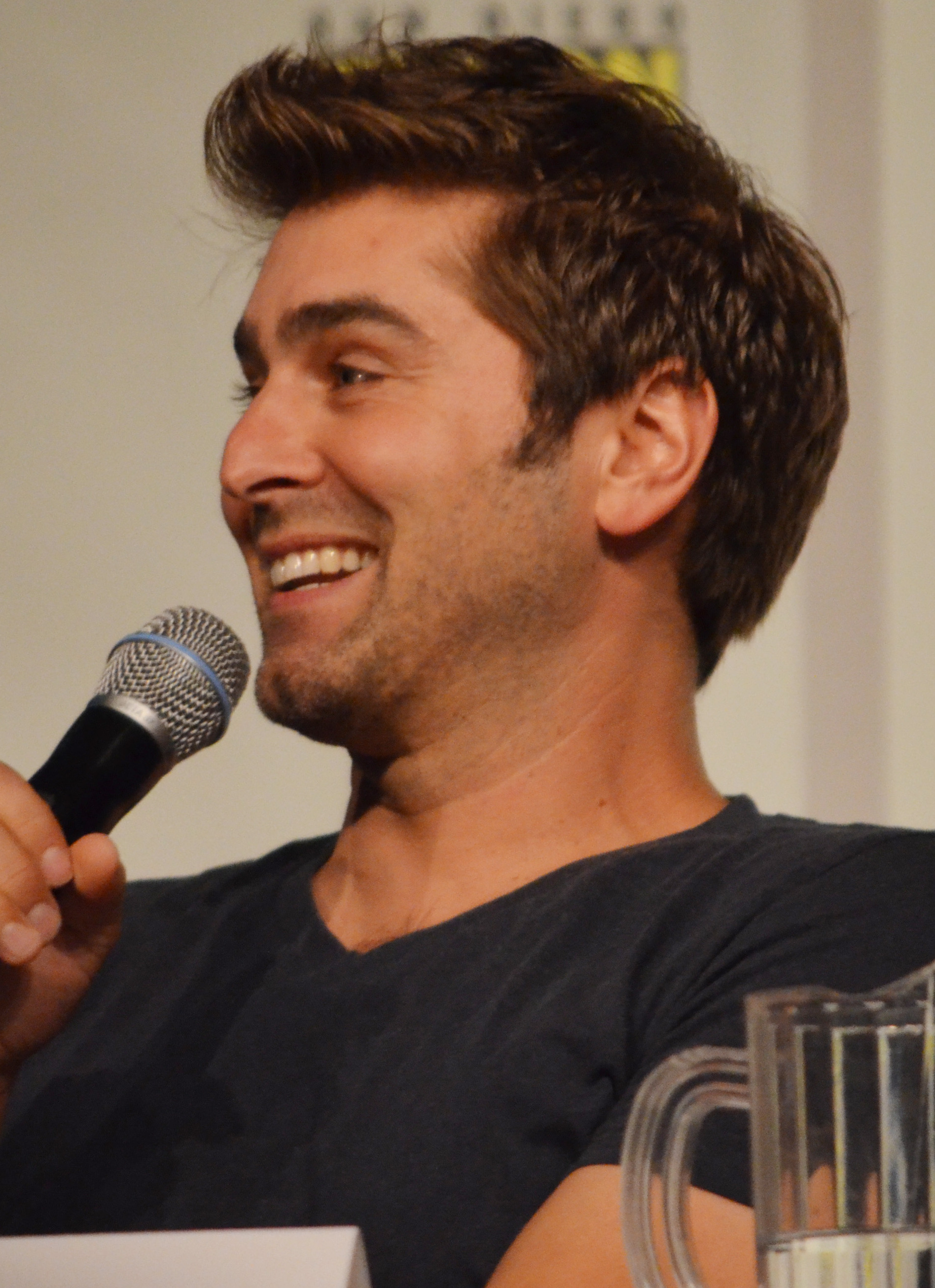
- Belleci in 2012
- Born: Salvatore Paul Belleci; October 30, 1970 (age 55); Monterey, California, US
- Education: San Francisco State University
- Occupations: Model maker, television host
- Spouse: Erin Bothamley (m. 2020)
- Children: 1
- Website: torybelleci.com

Salvatore Paul Belleci (/bəˈleɪtʃi/ bə-LAY-chee; born October 30, 1970) is an American television personality and model maker, best known for his work on the Discovery Channel television program MythBusters. He has also worked with Industrial Light and Magic on films including Star Wars: Episode I – The Phantom Menace and Star Wars: Episode II – Attack of the Clones. The Federation battleships and podracers are some of Belleci's pieces.

== Early life ==
Belleci has a long history of working with fire and explosives. At an early age, his father showed him how to make a Molotov cocktail. Later, he accidentally set part of his house on fire with a homemade flamethrower. When he was 19, he was nearly arrested for setting off a homemade pipe bomb near his parents' home in Seaside, California. The responding police officer encouraged the young Belleci to find a way of expressing his love for explosions and special effects in a way that did not involve getting arrested.

== Career ==
=== Early work ===
In 1994, after graduating from San Francisco State University's film school, he started working with Jamie Hyneman at M5 Industries. Belleci worked as a stage manager, running errands and cleaning the shop, but quickly moved up the ranks. A few years later, he started work at Industrial Light and Magic (ILM). Belleci worked for ILM for eight years as a model builder, sculptor, and painter. Belleci began work on Discovery Channel's MythBusters in 2003, doing work behind the scenes and, in the second season, was featured as part of the show's build team. In the show's third season, he received on-screen credit. In 2005, Belleci persuaded fellow ILM veteran Grant Imahara to join the show, following the departure of original cast member Scottie Chapman.

Belleci worked on the Matrix trilogy, Van Helsing, Peter Pan, Starship Troopers, Galaxy Quest and Bicentennial Man.

One of his short films, SandTrooper, has appeared on Syfy and in the Slamdance Film Festival.

=== MythBusters ===
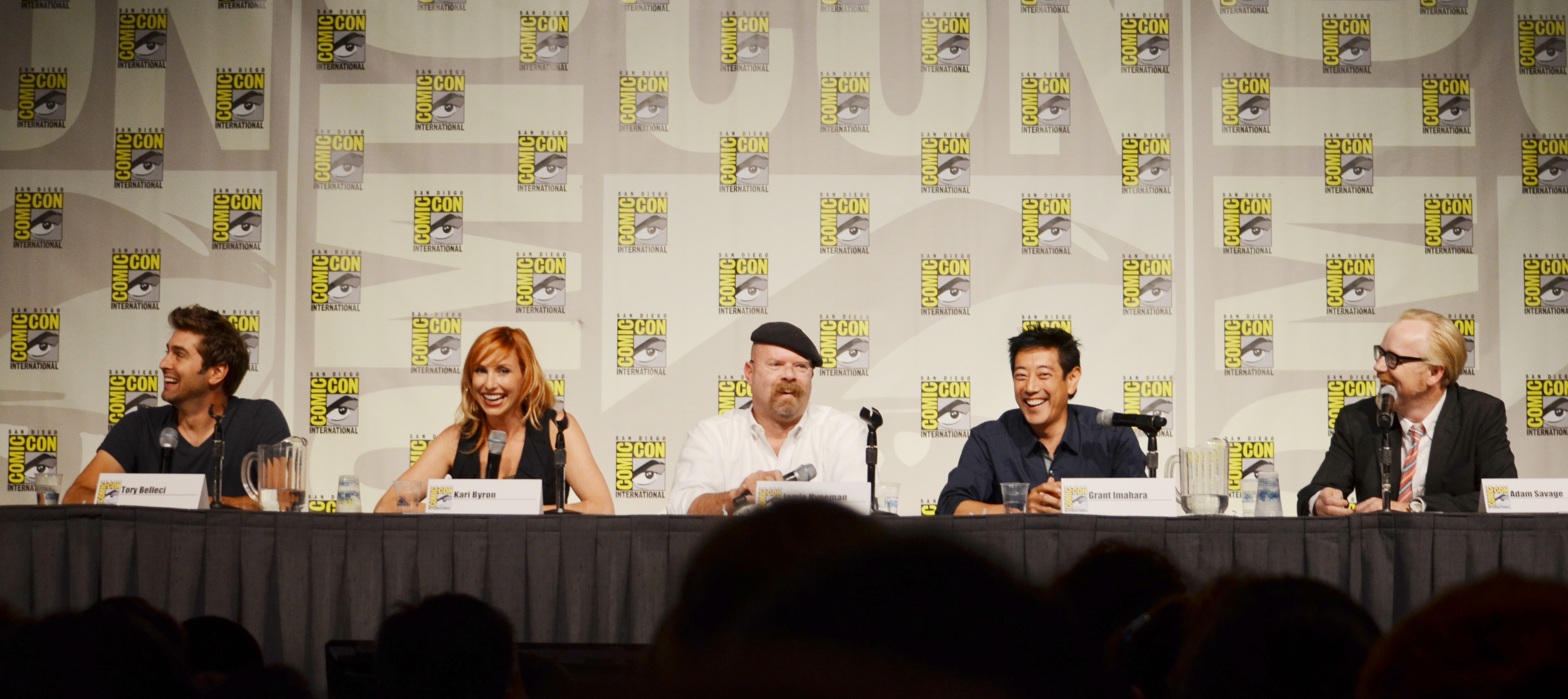
MythBusters Belleci, Kari Byron, Jamie Hyneman, Grant Imahara, and Adam Savage in 2012.

Belleci was often considered by fellow MythBusters Kari Byron and Grant Imahara to be more of a daredevil and, as such, often performed the more dangerous stunts when testing a myth. These have included: testing the "Red Flag to a Bull" myth; testing the myth that a human's tongue will instantly stick to a frozen pole, in the "Snow Special" episode; and the myth "can you stay underwater for an hour while breathing through a dart tube?", in the "Ninja Movie Myths 2" episode. One of his more popular stunts, shown several times on the show, was an attempt to jump over a toy wagon on a bicycle; the attempt failed, resulting in Belleci flipping forward and landing on his face. The bike almost hit Belleci's head. As a result of doing these stunts, he is often involved in comical accidents while testing myths. According to the October 28, 2012, episode of MythBusters, he suffers from acrophobia.

During the "Hollywood Hang" sequence, of the 2010 episode "Soda Cup Killer", Belleci fell off a roof, and despite being strapped into a safety harness system, landed in an open window frame below the drop point, and injured his leg, causing substantial bleeding.

He and Byron made a guest appearance on the October 3, 2012, episode of the Discovery series Sons of Guns. They test-fired some of the weapons in the Red Jacket shop and watched as the staff re-tested a myth previously busted by the Build Team: that a propane tank could explode if struck by a bullet.

On August 21, 2014, it was announced that Belleci, along with his co-stars Byron and Imahara, would be leaving MythBusters.

In 2021, Belleci returned to host Motor MythBusters and was joined by engineer Bisi Ezerioha and mechanic Faye Hadley. The show focuses on tall tales about automobiles and last aired in March 2022.

In June 2025, Belleci and Byron launched the Mythfits podcast, in which they explore contemporary science, history and culture as well as revisit their time on the show.

=== Other work ===
From 2011 to 2013, he co-hosted Punkin Chunkin on the Science Channel with fellow MythBusters build team members Kari Byron and Grant Imahara.

In 2013, Belleci created a YouTube channel, Blow It Up, where he and various guests use explosives to blow up everyday items.

In 2015, Byron and Belleci hosted Thrill Factor, a new show for the Travel Channel. In this show they visit and showcase thrill rides around the world and explore a little bit of science such as the effect of G forces on breathing, heart rate and other factors.

Belleci starred alongside Imahara and Byron in the Netflix show White Rabbit Project, which premiered on December 9, 2016.

Belleci starred alongside Richard Hammond (Top Gear, The Grand Tour) for the Amazon Video series The Great Escapists, announced in August 2019 which was produced by Hammond's Chimp Productions. The fictional six-episode adventure series stranded the two on a deserted island via shipwreck, and the two used available resources to build out the means to survive on the island.

Beginning in 2020, Belleci co-hosted The Explosion Show on the Science Channel.

Belleci also appeared in Jackass Forever (2022), and Jackass: Best and Last (2026).

== Personal life ==
Belleci proposed to his longtime girlfriend, Erin Bothamley, in 2018. They married in a private ceremony in 2020. They had a daughter on August 22, 2021.

During MythBusters' 2010 break, Belleci volunteered time to visit Haiti. He visited orphanages and installed clean-water systems with "Life Giving Force," a nonprofit organization dedicated to providing clean water to communities in need. He communicated that the trip has had a profound effect on him and that he admires the resilience of the Haitian people.

Belleci is a devout Christian.
