= Grant Imahara =

American engineer and TV host (1970–2020)

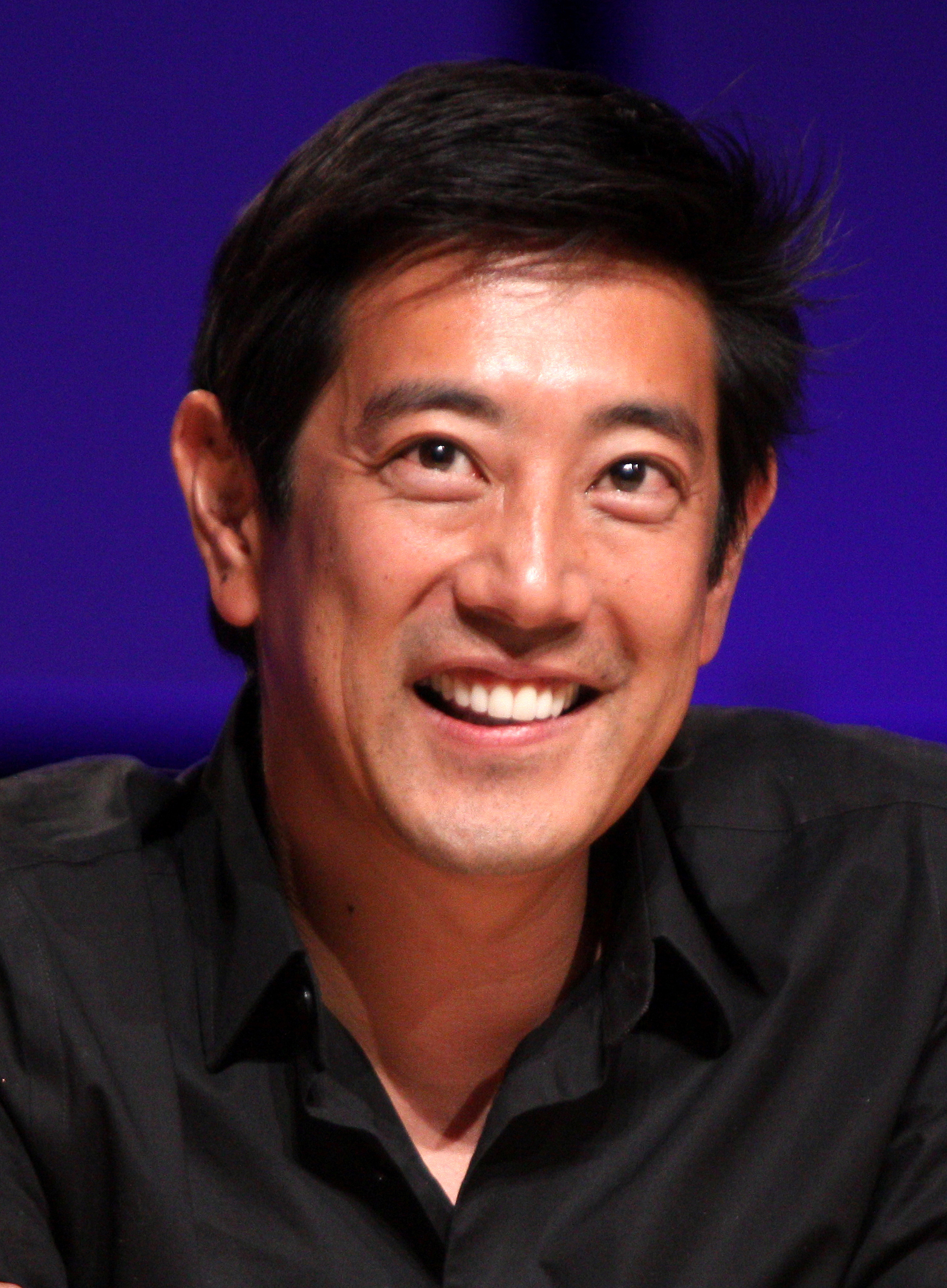
- Imahara in 2013
- Born: Grant Masaru Imahara; October 23, 1970; Los Angeles, California, U.S.
- Died: July 13, 2020 (aged 49); Los Angeles, California, U.S.
- Education: University of Southern California (BS)
- Occupations: Electrical engineer; roboticist; television host
- Known for: MythBusters; BattleBots

Grant Masaru Imahara (October 23, 1970 – July 13, 2020) was an American electrical engineer, roboticist, television host and actor. He was best known for his work on the television series MythBusters, on which he designed, built, and operated numerous robots and machines to test myths over the course of the show.

Imahara began his career at Lucasfilm, where he worked in the THX division as an engineer and in the Industrial Light & Magic (ILM) division in visual effects. His work has been featured in films from franchises such as Star Wars, Jurassic Park, The Matrix, and Terminator. His first foray into television was on the robot combat series BattleBots, for which he designed and competed with his robot Deadblow and later returned as a judge. Imahara was also a chief model maker with ILM on such movie projects as Galaxy Quest. In 2005, Imahara joined the cast of Mythbusters as a member of the Build Team, appearing in over 200 episodes of the series until his departure in 2014. In 2010, he designed the animatronic "robot skeleton" Geoff Peterson to serve as a sidekick on The Late Late Show with Craig Ferguson. He starred in the 2016 Netflix series White Rabbit Project alongside his MythBusters co-stars Kari Byron and Tory Belleci.

Imahara portrayed Hikaru Sulu in all 11 episodes of the web series Star Trek Continues. He also played Lieutenant Masaru in the 2015 movie Star Trek: Renegades. Imahara died on July 13, 2020, at the age of 49, after suffering a ruptured intracranial aneurysm.

== Early life ==
Imahara was born on October 23, 1970, to a Japanese-American family in Los Angeles, California. His Japanese name was Imahara Masaru (今原 真申). Imahara graduated from the University of Southern California (USC) with a bachelor of science degree in electrical engineering. For a time, he considered switching majors with the intention of becoming a screenwriter, but he decided to stay on the engineering track after assisting Tomlinson Holman, a professor at the USC School of Cinematic Arts.

Imahara was a live action role-playing gamer.

== Career ==
=== Early work ===
After graduation, Imahara was hired as an engineer for Lucasfilm's THX division; he then moved to the company's visual effects division, Industrial Light & Magic (ILM), where he worked for nine years. While at ILM, he was involved in several films, including The Lost World: Jurassic Park, Star Wars: Episode I – The Phantom Menace, Galaxy Quest, A.I. Artificial Intelligence, Star Wars: Episode II – Attack of the Clones, Terminator 3: Rise of the Machines, The Matrix Reloaded, The Matrix Revolutions, Van Helsing, and Star Wars: Episode III – Revenge of the Sith.

Imahara has been credited in many feature films as a model maker. In particular, he was credited for his work in updating the aging R2-D2 robots for the Star Wars prequel trilogy. As an official Artoo Technician, he made a cameo appearance in the mockumentary R2-D2: Beneath the Dome. He was also credited as chief model maker for Industrial Light & Magic on such projects as Galaxy Quest in 1999 wherein he designed custom circuit boards to provide the lighting effects on the NSEA-Protector space ship engine nacelles.

=== MythBusters ===
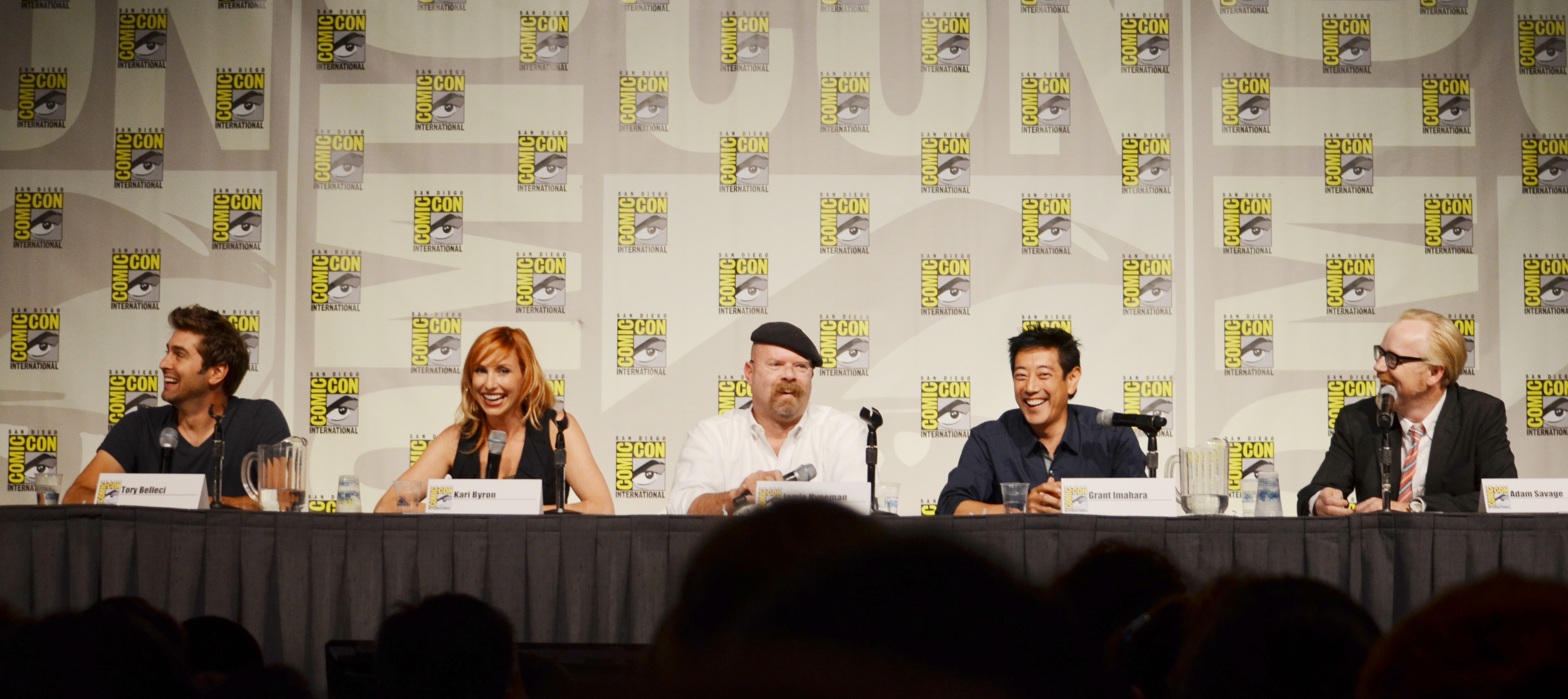
Imahara (second from right) alongside fellow MythBusters at the 2012 San Diego Comic-Con

Imahara joined MythBusters on the invitation of friend and occasional employer Jamie Hyneman and former ILM colleague Linda Wolkovitch, who was an associate producer of MythBusters. He joined as the third member of the Build Team along with Kari Byron and Tory Belleci, replacing former MythBusters welder Scottie Chapman. His colleagues often jokingly referred to him as the "geek" of the Build Team. He often built robots that were needed for the show and specialized in operating computers and electronics for testing the myths. Imahara, along with Byron and Belleci, left the show after the 2014 season.

=== White Rabbit Project ===
Imahara reunited with Byron and Belleci for the 2016 White Rabbit Project, a Netflix Original Series, in which the team investigated topics such as jailbreaks, superpower technology, heists, and bizarre World War II weapons, evaluated against a defined set of criteria and explored through experiments, builds, and tests. The complete first season of the series was released on Netflix on December 9, 2016. Despite receiving good reviews, the series was not renewed.

=== Other work ===
In addition to his role on MythBusters, he is known for his appearances on BattleBots, where he designed and competed with his robot Deadblow. By 2018, he was selected as one of the judges for the eighth season on BattleBots. He made a cameo appearance on Syfy's Eureka and the web series The Guild. Other works include designing the circuit that created the rhythmic oscillation of the arms of the modern Energizer Bunny; leading Team ILM to victory in an appearance on Junkyard Mega-Wars; and authoring Kickin' Bot: An Illustrated Guide to Building Combat Robots (ISBN 0-7645-4113-7).

Imahara was a cast member and story writer for the short film Architects of Evil, created for the 2004 Industrial Light & Magic Backyard Film Contest. He was a mentor for the Richmond High robotics team Biomechs #841 for the FIRST Robotics Competition, lending his expert guidance on how to create the right robot for the right job. Imahara was profiled in the magazine IEEE Spectrum for an issue focusing on engineering dream jobs.

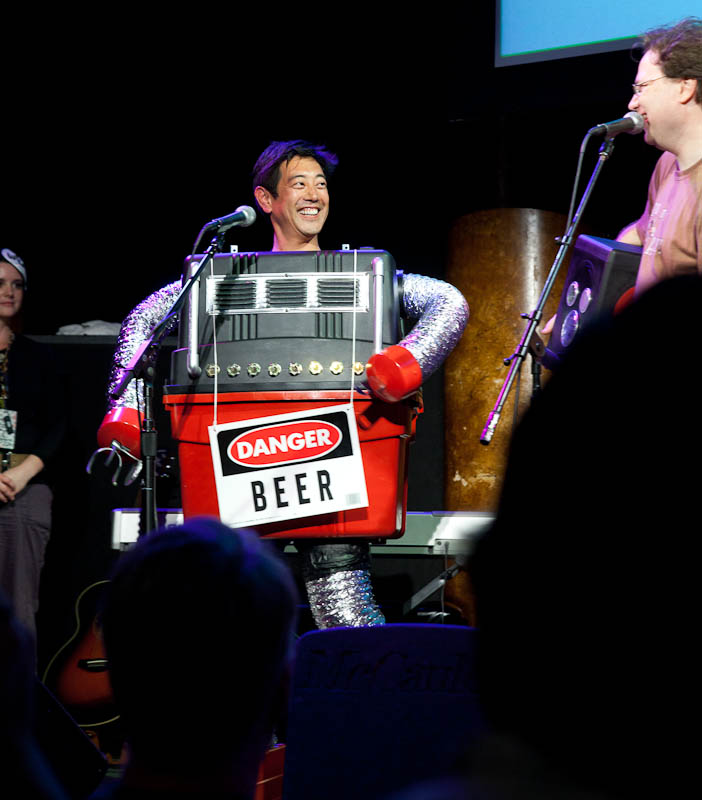
Imahara in a "BeerBot" robot costume at W00tstock in 2010

One of Imahara's independent projects, during early 2010, was constructing a robotic sidekick for Craig Ferguson, host of The Late Late Show. The robot, named Geoff Peterson, was unveiled on The Late Late Show's April 5, 2010, episode. It was controlled and voiced by comedian and voice actor Josh Robert Thompson.

In 2012, Imahara's likeness was used in the popular webcomic America Jr, in which he appeared as himself as a celebrity judge for a competition to select the country's Surgeon General.

In 2012, Imahara had a cameo role on the finale of Eureka, in the episode titled "Just Another Day", as a robotics scientist operating EMO.

Imahara portrayed Hikaru Sulu in all 11 episodes of the web series Star Trek Continues. He also played Lieutenant Masaru in the 2015 movie Star Trek: Renegades.

Imahara was a guest on TWiT's Triangulation (episode 121) on September 25, 2013. He also partnered with Mouser Electronics to kick off their "Empowering Innovation Together" campaign, where he hosts several webisodes.

In 2014, Imahara appeared in a series of videos showing the behind-the-scenes process of how several McDonald's foods are made.

He made an appearance in the 2015 TV movie Sharknado 3: Oh Hell No!

Imahara took an active part in advising Team USA in a giant-robot battle between American company MegaBots and Japanese company Suidobashi Heavy Industry.

Imahara hosted the second season of the web series The Home of the Future, produced by The Verge in partnership with Curbed.

On October 18, 2017, Imahara tweeted that he had been consulting for Walt Disney Imagineering for six months, for a "top secret" project. On May 21, 2018, he was included as an author on the Disney Research paper "Stickman: Towards a Human Scale Acrobatic Robot", which explores the creation of "a simple two degree of freedom robot that uses a gravity-driven pendulum launch and produces a variety of somersaulting stunts". On June 29, 2018, Disney revealed that the Stickman prototype had evolved into an innovative, autonomous, self-correcting, acrobatic style of audio-animatronic figure, named Stuntronics, which will be utilized within Disney theme parks throughout the world.

In March 2020, while Imahara was working as a consultant for Disney Research and a mechanical designer at Spectral Moon, he built a fully animatronic model of Baby Yoda with the intention of touring children's hospitals with the lifelike robot to cheer up sick children. Imahara spent three months on the personal project doing the mechanical design, programming and 3D printing and completed it four months prior to his death.

== Personal life ==
Imahara was engaged to his long-time girlfriend, costume designer and actress Jennifer Newman (granddaughter of Robin Olds) since 2016. They began dating in August 2011.

Imahara mentored the robotics team at Richmond High School in California while working for Lucasfilm's VFX.

== Death and legacy ==
Imahara died on July 13, 2020, at the age of 49, after suffering a ruptured, previously undiagnosed intracranial aneurysm. As a result, Discovery Channel and the Science Channel ran a marathon broadcast over two days in Imahara's honor, using selected MythBusters episodes, the TV special Killer Robots: Robogames 2011 (which Imahara hosted), and finishing with the White Rabbit Project episode "May G Force Be with You".

On October 23, 2020, on what would have been his 50th birthday, the Grant Imahara STEAM Foundation was announced by his mother, professional colleagues, and friends (including Mythbusters castmates Kari Byron, Tory Belleci and Adam Savage). It provides mentorship, grants and scholarships to under-served youth pursuing STEAM-related fields. More than 80 props from Mythbusters were auctioned to benefit the Grant Imahara STEAM Foundation in August 2021. Some of those props had been built by Imahara during the more than 200 episodes of Mythbusters that he appeared in between 2005 and 2014.

Several months after his death, BattleBots co-founder Greg Munson announced on an episode of The Adam Savage Project podcast that it had renamed its "Best Design Award" to the "Grant Imahara Award for Best Design" as a tribute to Imahara.

In the Dungeons & Dragons web series Critical Role, Imahara is honored by Dungeon Master Matthew Mercer as a non-player character known as Imahara Joe. Imahara Joe is a tinkerer who helps the main characters build mechanical automaton motorbikes to achieve their goals. Mercer tweeted that Imahara was "one of the most lovely people I have ever known".
