= Adam Savage =

American television host (born 1967)

- Savage in 2025
- Born: Adam Whitney Savage; July 15, 1967 (age 59); New York City, U.S.
- Occupations: Special effects creator; educational video presenter
- Known for: Mythbusters; Tested.com
- Spouse: Julia Ward (m. 2004)
- Children: 2

YouTube information
- Channel: Adam Savage's Tested
- Years active: 2010–present
- Subscribers: 7.2 million
- Views: 1.812 billion
- Last updated: 8 May 2026
- Website: adamsavage.com

Adam Whitney Savage (born July 15, 1967) is an American special effects creator and educational video presenter. He is best known as the former co-host, with Jamie Hyneman, of the Discovery Channel television series MythBusters and Unchained Reaction. His model work has appeared in major films, including Star Wars: Episode II – Attack of the Clones and The Matrix Reloaded. He hosts the TV program Savage Builds, which premiered on the Science Channel on June 14, 2019. His platform Adam Savage's Tested includes a website and a YouTube channel.

== Early life ==
Savage was born on July 15, 1967, in New York City. He grew up in North Tarrytown (now Sleepy Hollow), a town in Westchester County about 25 miles (40 km) north of New York City. He graduated from Sleepy Hollow High School in 1985. His maternal grandfather, Cushman Haagensen, was a surgeon who pioneered breast cancer surgery. His father, Whitney Lee Savage (1928–1998), was a painter, filmmaker, and animator known for his work on Sesame Street and The Electric Company, two nationally syndicated public television children's shows. The Clay Center in Charleston, West Virginia, features some of his work in its permanent collection. Whitney Lee was also known for directing the 1969 underground short film Mickey Mouse in Vietnam.

His mother, Karen, was a psychotherapist. Savage was the second youngest of six children, with the four older children coming from his parents' previous marriages. He has two older brothers, two older sisters, and one younger sister. His sister Kate Savage is an artist.

Savage began acting as a child and had five years of acting school. His early credits include voicing animated characters that his father produced for Sesame Street, Mr. Whipple's stock boy Jimmy in a Charmin commercial, and a drowning young man saved by a lifeguard in the 1985 Billy Joel music video "You're Only Human (Second Wind)".

Savage abandoned acting at age 19. "I had passed on that in favor of doing stuff with my hands," he said. He describes MythBusters as "the perfect marriage of two things, performance, and special effects". As a teenager in Sleepy Hollow, Savage routinely visited the local bike shop to have flat tires fixed. The shop showed him how to do the repairs himself. From this experience, Savage said, "I realized you could take a bike apart and put it back together and it wasn't that hard... I've been building and putting bicycles together since then."

Savage broke his neck on his eighteenth birthday in a swimming accident, an injury he survived without suffering long-term consequences.

== Career ==
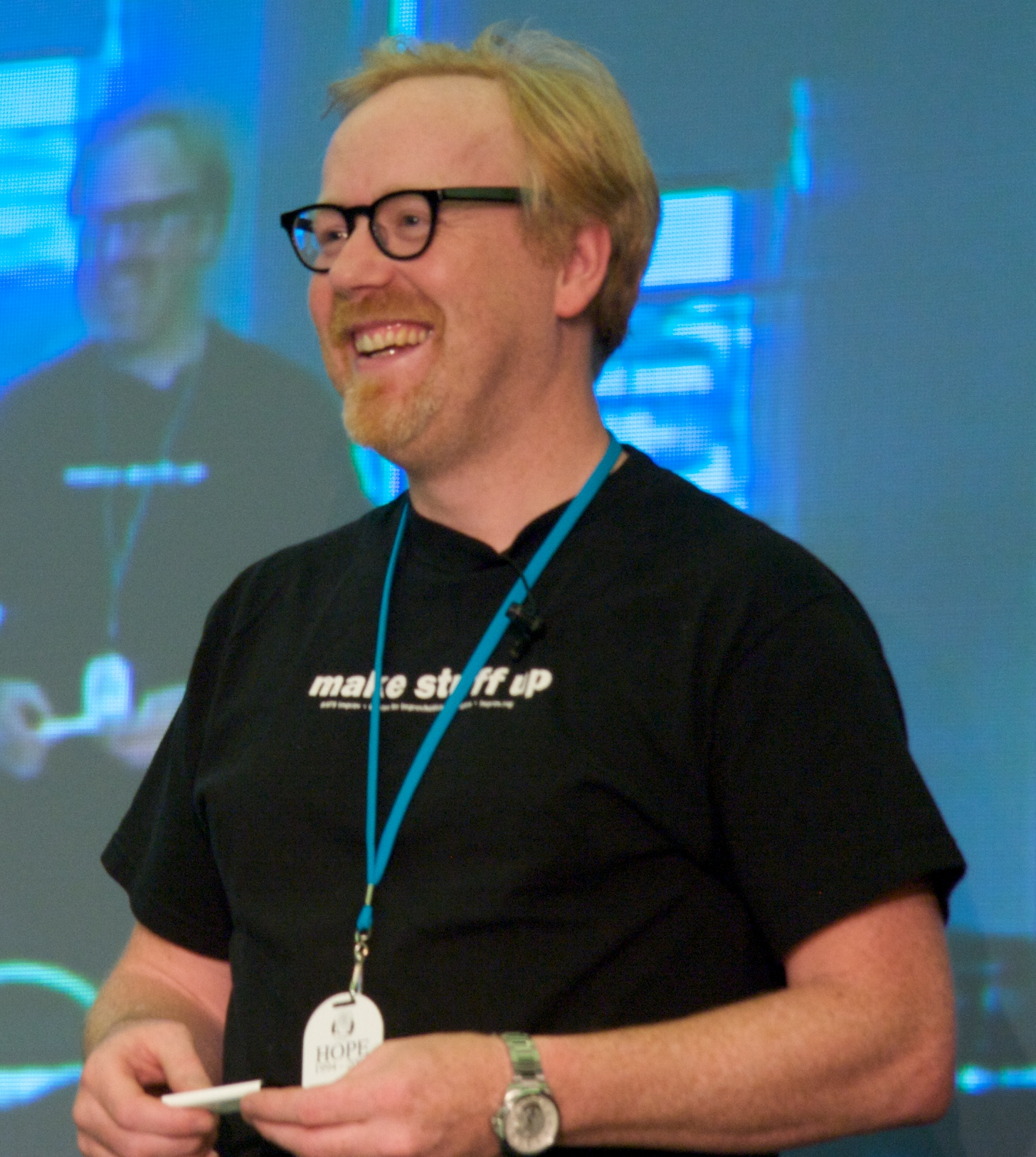
Savage in July 2008

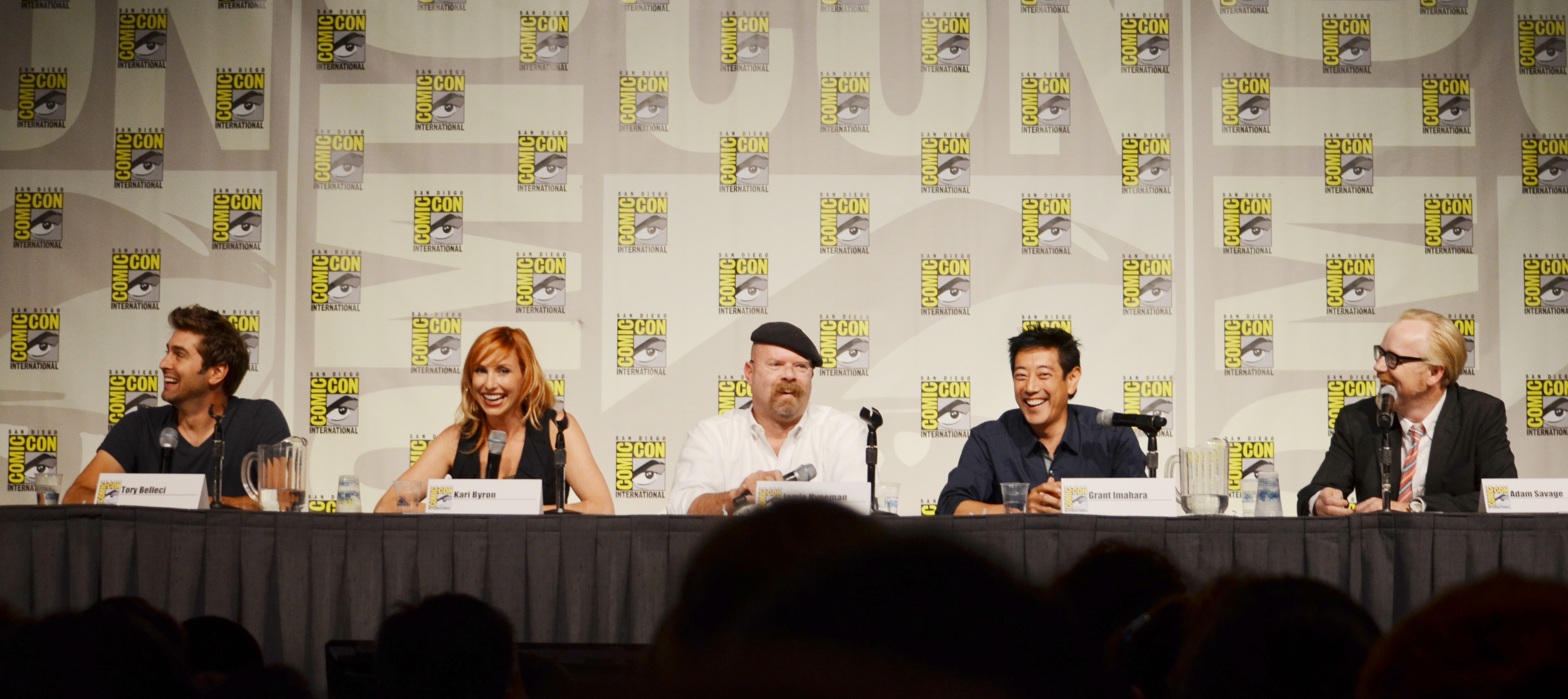
MythBusters Tory Belleci, Kari Byron, Jamie Hyneman, Grant Imahara, and Savage in 2012

Savage has worked as an animator, graphic designer, carpenter, projectionist, film developer, television presenter, set designer, toy designer, and gallery owner. He worked as a model maker on Galaxy Quest, Bicentennial Man, Star Wars: Episode II – Attack of the Clones, The Mummy, The Matrix Reloaded, and Space Cowboys, among others. He played the role of a helpful engineer in the 2001 film Ever Since the World Ended and the part of an army surplus store owner who sells a man a rocket engine for his pickup truck in the 2006 film The Darwin Awards, which also featured MythBusters co-star Jamie Hyneman.

Savage appeared with Hyneman on CSI: Crime Scene Investigation on the May 1, 2008, episode "The Theory of Everything". He appears as a special effects artist in the "making of" material for The Matrix Revolutions, where he discusses some of the miniature effects used and the difficulties involved. He previously taught advanced model making in the Department of Industrial Design at the Academy of Art University in San Francisco.

Savage was a regular presenter at magician James Randi's annual skeptics conference The Amaz!ng Meeting, first appearing in January 2006. He credits Michael Shermer with introducing him to the skeptical community. Shermer interviewed him for Skeptic Magazine in 2006. He appeared in the United Kingdom, giving a talk at the first Amaz!ng Meeting London in October 2009 hosted at the Mermaid Conference Centre, Blackfriars. He was a featured performer at the three w00tstock v1.x shows in 2009 and appeared in four w00tstock v2.x shows in 2010. He appeared as a guest on Diggnation's 220th show.

Savage has been a regular guest speaker at the annual Maker Faire since 2008, speaking on different topics such as his obsession with the dodo bird and problem-solving, and taking questions from the audience members about MythBusters, among other topics. He hosted an episode of the Discovery Channel series Curiosity, in which he speculated whether humans could live forever. He discussed various topics during the program, such as limb regeneration, organ printers, and age reversal. In 2011, he appeared as "Dan" in a short film directed by Frank Ippolito entitled Night of the Little Dead. On November 25, 2011, he received an honorary doctorate from the University of Twente (Enschede, Netherlands) for popularizing science and technology.

Savage and Hyneman were judges on the game show Unchained Reaction which premiered in March 2012. Savage is an occasional guest host for lecture events at the San Francisco-based non-profit City Arts & Lectures, and he delivered a keynote address at the South by Southwest conference on March 10, 2014. On March 24, 2012, he appeared as a featured speaker at the first Reason Rally in Washington D.C. On May 18, 2012, he was the commencement speaker at Sarah Lawrence College. He co-hosts the weekly podcast Still Untitled: The Adam Savage Project. The project launched on June 5, 2012, and is in the format of a conversation among Savage, tested.com editors-in-chief Will Smith and Norman Chan, and Simone Giertz about topics from science and movies to do it yourself and work ethics. Episodes typically last 30 to 45 minutes. Savage is a co-owner, editor, and contributor at tested.com.

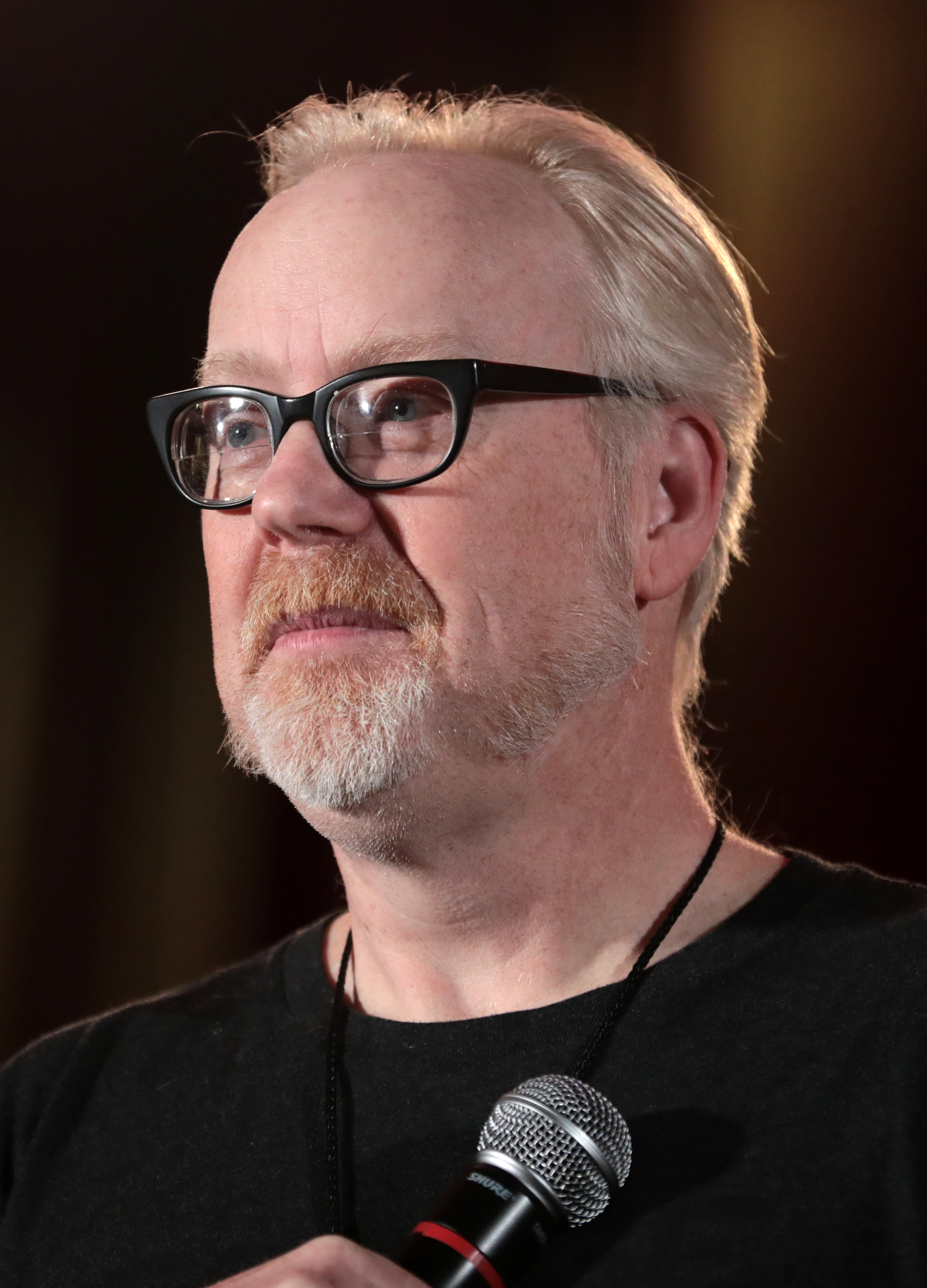
Savage in May 2019

In 2017, Savage toured with Michael Stevens on the Brain Candy LIVE! tour. In April 2017, he played the role of a mission specialist in the episode Caliban's War of the series The Expanse. In June 2017, he was named "Humanist of the Year" by the American Humanist Association at their annual conference. In October 2017, he played a cameo as a merchant selling blood bags in the Blade Runner 2049 short film 2048: Nowhere to Run.

In April 2018, Discovery Channel announced that Savage would host and produce a new series called MythBusters Jr. which focused on a group of young scientists tasked with completing various experiments using STEAM skills. In July 2018, he created and acted in the short film A Farewell To Arms in collaboration with Weta Workshop. The same year, he won the Heinz Oberhummer Award for Science Communication. In February 2020, SiliCon Valley Comic Con appointed him as its Creative Director, succeeding Steve Wozniak.

In 2022, Savage became godfather of the Discovery Princess cruise ship. In 2023, he created a box for Isaac Newton's death mask held by the Royal Society.

=== MythBusters ===
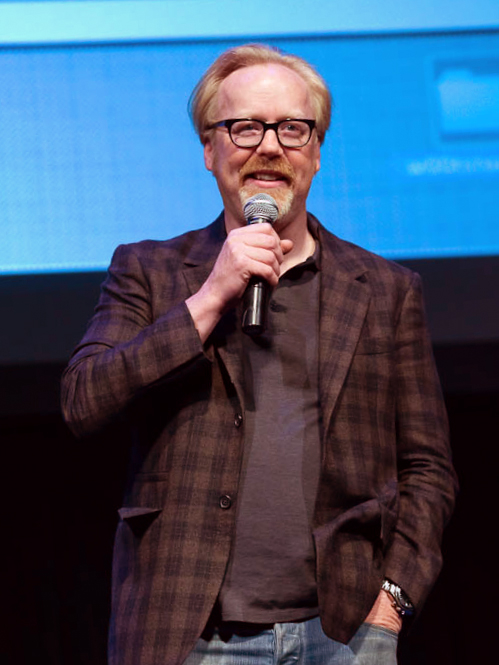
Savage in July 2011

Savage starred on MythBusters from 2003 to 2016. His role with his co-hosts was to disprove or confirm myths through testing and experiments done at different scales. His demeanor on MythBusters is animated and energetic, providing a foil to Jamie Hyneman's more reserved straight-man persona. Savage and Hyneman were the sole hosts of the show for the first season of MythBusters. They introduced members of Hyneman's staff in the second season, who began to appear regularly. Kari Byron, Tory Belleci, and welder Scottie Chapman appeared in the second season.

In the third season, robot-builder and model-maker Grant Imahara replaced Chapman. MythBusters was filmed in San Francisco and edited in Artarmon, New South Wales. It aired 282 total episodes before its cancellation at the end of its 2016 season. In November 2017, Discovery's sister network Science Channel revived the series with new hosts Jon Lung and Brian Louden.

In 2019, Savage hosted the spin-off series Mythbusters Jr., featuring a team of teenagers skilled in STEAM topics.

=== Other work ===
In 2019, Savage published his first book, Every Tool's a Hammer: Life Is What You Make It, exploring his approach to making.

== Personal life ==
Savage at his "cave" in 2025

Savage married Julia Ward on September 11, 2004. He has twin sons from a previous relationship. He wears hearing aids in both ears due to congenital otosclerosis.

In the late 1980s, Savage lived at Eighth Avenue and Carroll Street in Park Slope, Brooklyn. He later moved in with his parents for less than a year, working for a graphic design firm in Manhattan. A close friend living on Broderick Street in San Francisco asked him to become his roommate, and Savage moved to San Francisco in August 1990. He continues to live in San Francisco.

In a 2011 interview, Savage publicly identified himself as an atheist. In a 2019 Twitter post, he said he was an agnostic. In a YouTube video dated December 14, 2020, Savage stated that he had married 20 to 25 couples over 25 years, and implied that he was an ordained minister with the Universal Life Church, a group whose only belief is "Do that which is right."

Regarding his relationship with Hyneman, he mentioned that although the two were not friends, they had mutual respect for each other, stating "We didn't care to say the truth to each other, because we didn't care if we hurt each other's feelings," he said. "It has to do with respect."

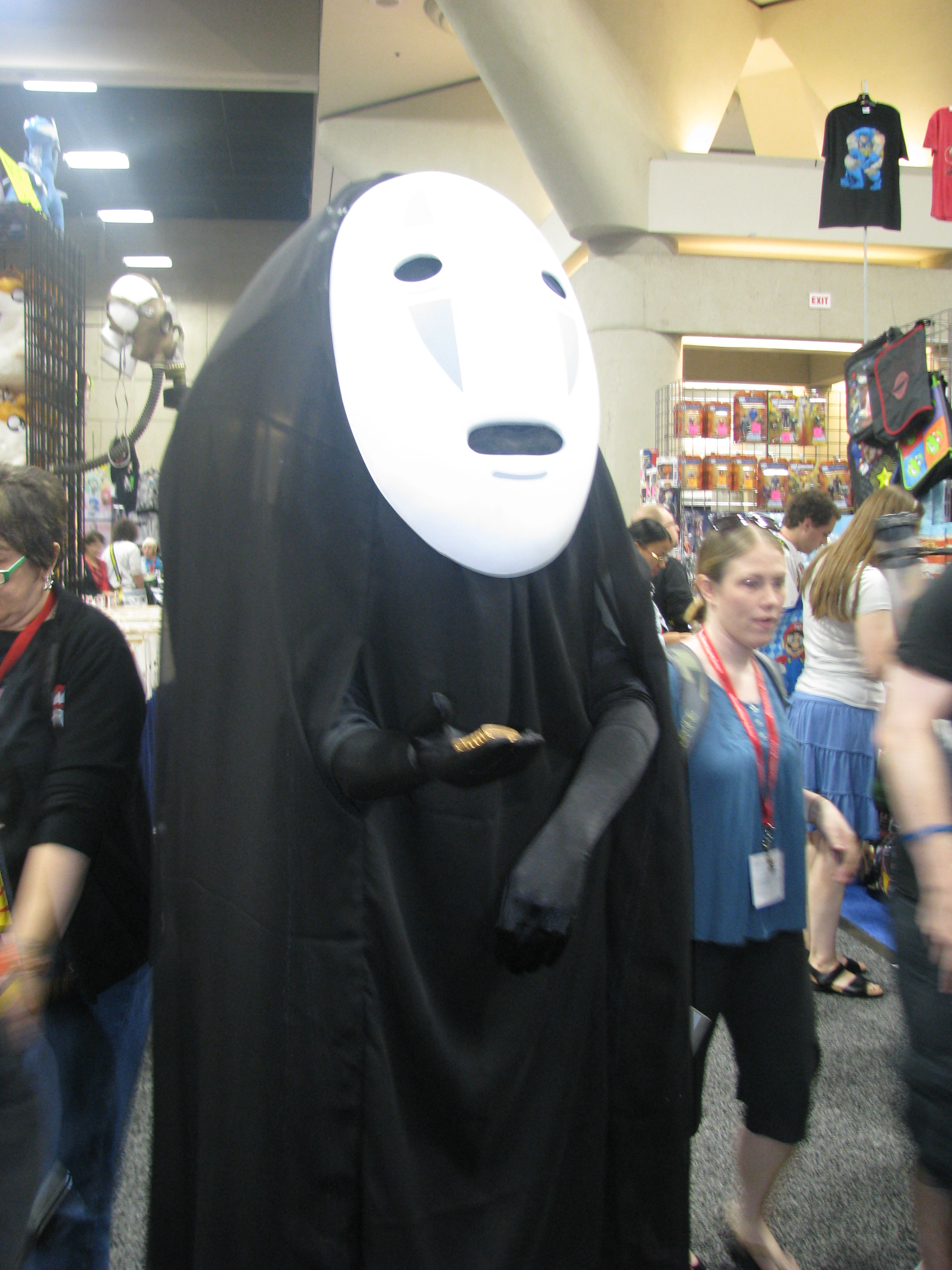
Savage cosplaying as "No-Face" from Spirited Away at San Diego Comic-Con in 2011

Savage has a lifelong interest in costume making and cosplay. He stated, "I remember my mom getting me a Jaws costume when Jaws came out... and wearing a Batman costume. Back then, everyone dressed up as hobos." He strives for authenticity with his costumes. While in high school, he and his father made a suit of armor out of aluminum roof flashing with seven hundred rivets. "I wore it to school and passed out from heat exhaustion in math class. I woke up in the nurse's office, and the first thing I said was, 'Where's my armor?'"

In June 2020, Savage's younger sister, Miranda Pacchiana, filed a lawsuit against him, alleging that Savage had repeatedly raped her when they were both children. Savage responded:

While I hope that my sister gets the help she needs to find peace, this needs to end. For many years, she has relentlessly and falsely attacked me and other members of my family to anyone who will listen [...] I will fight this groundless and offensive lawsuit and work to put this to rest once and for all.

The siblings' mother came to Adam's defense, stating, "It makes me very sad to say this, but my daughter suffers from severe mental health challenges, and it's devastating that she's putting Adam and our entire family through this. Adam is a good man, and I support him completely." The lawsuit was settled through mediation on May 24, 2021, and dismissed the next day. Details of the settlement were not made public. Pacchiana removed her original blog post about Savage, which had precipitated the lawsuit.
