= Discovery Science (Indian TV channel) =

Indian pay Television channel

- Type: Science Channel
- Country: India
- Broadcast area: India; Bangladesh; Nepal; Sri Lanka
- Headquarters: Mumbai, Maharashtra, India

Programming
- Languages: English; Hindi
- Picture format: 576i (SDTV 16:9)

Ownership
- Owner: Warner Bros. Discovery India
- Sister channels: See List of channels owned by Warner Bros. Discovery in India

History
- Launched: 25 January 2010; 16 years ago

Availability - Available on all major Indian DTH & Cables.

Terrestrial
- DVB-T2 (India): Check local frequencies

Streaming media
- Discovery+ (India): SD & HD
- Jio TV (India): SD & HD
- Amazon Prime Video (India): SD & HD

Discovery Science is an Indian pay television network, operated by Warner Bros. Discovery India. It primarily features programming in the fields of space, technology, and science. The channel is a science television channel. It was launched in 2010. From 1 March 2021, it began to follow a timeshifted schedule of the Southeast Asia feed.

== History ==
Former logo used by Discovery Science from 2010 to 2012

The channel was launched on 25 January 2010.

Discovery Science introduced its 2011 global logo in India in July 2013.

Discovery Science India did not rebrand to match the other international channels in 2016.

== Programming ==
Science Channel broadcasts a number of science-related television series originally produced by or aired on Discovery Channel, such as Beyond Tomorrow, among others. Discovery Communications has also produced a few programs specifically for Science, such as MegaScience and What The Ancients Knew. Programs from other Discovery Networks channels, PBS and the BBC are either regularly or occasionally aired on the network. Television series produced in the 1990s, such as Discover Magazine and Understanding, are carried on the network's weekday schedule. Science also broadcasts programs such as Moments of Impact and An Idiot Abroad. The channel has experienced some drifting from its intended format throughout its existence, increasingly adding reruns on several science fiction series such as Firefly and Fringe to its schedule in recent years.

== Specials and miniseries ==
- 2057 – Predictions on the future technology of the body, city, and the world.
- Uncovering Aliens - 2013 mini series of 4 episodes.
- Base Camp Moon – Returning to the Moon, harvesting Moon dust for oxygen/water, robotics (Robonaut), etc.
- The Challenger Disaster – A biography surrounding the mystery of the titular tragedy, starring William Hurt. Science's first foray into dramatic programming, its premiere on the channel will be simulcast on sister network Discovery Channel.
- The Critical Eye – An eight-part series examining pseudoscientific and paranormal phenomena.
- Dinosaur Revolution – A four-part miniseries on the natural history of dinosaurs. The last two episodes were planned to air on Discovery Channel, but a last-minute schedule change landed them on Science.
- Exploring Time – A two-hour TV documentary mini-series about natural time scale changes
- Extreme Smuggling
- Futurecar – New technology may be used to create advanced cars and sometimes funny cars in the future.
- Hawking – About the early work of British theoretical physicist Stephen Hawking.
- Hubble Live – Launch of Space Shuttle Atlantis on NASA's Servicing Mission 4 (HST-SM4), the eleven-day fifth and final mission to repair the Hubble Space Telescope
- A Life In Memory – An hour-long documentary about Memories, and PTSD and the ways they effect our lives. "Barney recalls the day he was hit by a car: his back was broken, and his wife was killed. Today, he will be given a pill to erase the memory of that tragic day for good. At a treatment center in Montreal, PTSD patients are given a second chance at life."
- Lost Luggage – Rebroadcasts of An Idiot Abroad episodes from previous seasons, each including two new "Lost Luggage" segments filmed at Ricky Gervais' home in England in which Gervais and Karl Pilkington hold brief discussions.
- Mars Rising – A six-part series on possible future missions to Mars.
- NextWorld – Predicting the future of the world, humanity, and life.
- Outlaw Tech
- Perfect Disaster – Predicting violent natural disasters that could happen in the near future.
- Prophets of Science Fiction – Biographies of some of the greatest sci-fi authors.
- Punkin Chunkin – A one-hour condensed version of the World Championship pumpkin chunking contest in Sussex County, Delaware. Traditionally aired on Thanksgiving.
- Science of Star Wars – Explains how the cutting edge technology of Star Wars might be useful and possible to implement in everyday life.
- Tank on the Moon – Concentrates on Russian attempts to launch an unmanned rover to the Moon before the successful American Apollo program.
- What the Ancients Knew – Rediscovered innovations of the ancient world.
- The Planets (miniseries)
- The Planets and Beyond

== See also ==
- Discovery Channel
- Discovery Turbo
- Science Channel
- Pogo
