= Discovery Science =

Discovery science is a scientific methodology.

Discovery Science may also refer to:

== TV channels ==
- Discovery Science (European TV channel)
- Discovery Science (Asian TV channel)
- Discovery Science (Canadian TV channel)
- Discovery Science (Indian TV channel)
- Discovery Science (Latin American TV channel)
- Science Channel, American TV channel formerly called Discovery Science

== Science centers ==
- Discovery Science Place, located in Tyler, Texas
- Discovery Science Center, located in Santa Ana, California

== See also ==
- Fort Collins Museum & Discovery Science Center
- National Institute for Discovery Science
- Discovery (disambiguation)
- Science (disambiguation)
