= AAOM =

AAOM may refer to:

- American Academy Of Microbiology, now the American Society for Microbiology
- American Association of Oriental Medicine, now the American Association of Acupuncture and Oriental Medicine
- American Academy of Occupational Medicine, now the American College of Occupational and Environmental Medicine
- American Academy of Oral Medicine
- Alternativna Akademska Obrazovna Mreza
- American Association Of Museums
- American Association of Orthopedic Medicine
- Association of Assessing Officers of Manitoba
- Asia Academy of Management
- Australian Aboriginal Outreach Ministries
- Autism Alliance of Michigan
