= The Critical Eye =

TV series examining paranormal claims

- Genre: Paranormal
- Directed by: Brendan Goekel
- Starring: William B. Davis
- No. of seasons: 1
- No. of episodes: 8

Production
- Executive producer: Joshua C. Berkley
- Producer: Amy Mack
- Production company: 62 Blue Productions LLC

Original release
- Network: Discovery Science Channel
- Release: October 29, 2002 – February 24, 2003

The Critical Eye is a Discovery Science Channel documentary series examining pseudoscientific and paranormal phenomena. The eight-part documentary series aired from October 2002 through February 2003 and was hosted by actor and scientific skeptic William B. Davis.

== Series description ==
The Critical Eye, alternately labeled as just Critical Eye, was produced by the Discovery Science Channel, and was produced in association with Skeptical Inquirer Magazine. The show was described by cosmolearning.org as "William B. Davis hosts this programme bringing to the viewers the science behind the paranormal and the unexplained."

== Historical event references ==
The series discusses several notable events:

- The 1990 civil trial brought against Judas Priest alleging subliminal messaging in their music
- The Stargate Project
- The Phoenix Lights
- The Roswell UFO incident
- Project Blue Book
- The Heaven's Gate mass suicide

== Episodes ==
Each episode of the series consists of four or five segments focused specifically on one pseudoscientific or paranormal phenomenon. Each segment begins by explaining the phenomenon in question, discusses it with both scientists/skeptics and proponents/believers, and concludes with street interviews regarding the legitimacy of the phenomenon in question.

| No. | Title | Original release date |
|---|---|---|
| 1 | "Mind Games" | October 29, 2002 |
Explores hypnosis, subliminal messages & repressed memory. Guests: Judith Cassis, hypnotherapist; Joe Nickell; Phillip Appel, American Rehabilitation Hospital; David Willey; Justin Tranz; Robert Bornstein; James Alcock; Eldon Taylor, self-help author; Tim Moore, professor of psychology at York University; Neil Brick, abuse survivor and founder of the SMART newsletter; Elizabeth Loftus; Linda Walker, Child Protection Project/ritual abuse investigator; Richard Ofshe; Prudence Calabrese, transdimensional remote viewing consultant; Ray Hyman; Russell Targ.
| 2 | "The Dark Side" | October 29, 2002 |
Vampirism, witchcraft, voodoo rituals, and exorcism.
| 3 | "Alternative Medicine" | January 13, 2003 |
Acupuncture, homeopathy, reiki, therapeutic touch, gemstone therapy, and magnet therapy. Guests: Robert Park; David Molony, executive director of the American Association of Oriental Medicine; Wallace Sampson; James Gordon; James Reaves, acupuncture patient; Ronald Lawrence, author of Magnet Therapy; Gary Null; Pauline Crouch, naturopathic physician; Keith DeOrio, homeopathic practitioner; Gary P. Posner of the Scientific Review of Alternative Medicine; Holland Taylor; Bela Scheiber, founder of the Rocky Mountain Skeptics; Marianne Borelli, therapeutic touch practitioner; Irene Morelli, therapeutic touch practitioner; Kit Haggard, nurse & reiki master; Faith Sisk, reiki master.
| 4 | "Legendary Myths" | January 27, 2003 |
Bigfoot, the Loch Ness Monster, Atlantis, and Noah's Ark. Guests: Loren Coleman; Michael Dennett, writer; Benjamin Radford; Peter Byrne, Bigfoot hunter; John Morris; Gerald Larue; Ken Feder; John McIntosh, president of the SEARCH foundation; Justice Rines, Academy of Applied Science; David Childress; Matt Sapero, co-founder of Team Atlantis, an underwater archeological research team; Kevin Christopher of the Center for Inquiry.
| 5 | "Aliens" | February 3, 2003 |
Analyzes the likelihood that extraterrestrial intelligence exists. Guests: Stan Gordon, UFO researcher; Joe Nickell; James McGaha, astronomer & scientific skeptic; George Reynolds, UFO researcher; Ken Frazier, Skeptical Inquirer magazine; Bill Bean, UFO witness; Budd Hopkins; James Alcock; David Jacobs; Clifford Stone, aerial phenomenon researcher; John Greenwald of The Black Vault; Kevin Kennedy of the Unarius Academy of Science; Jill Tarter; Seth Shostak.
| 6 | "The Death Zone" | February 10, 2003 |
Near-death experiences, ghosts, reincarnation, and spirit channeling. Guests: Loyd Auerbach; Joe Nickell; Paul Kurtz; Aann Golemac, clairvoyant medium; Thomas Smith, paranormal investigator; PMH Atwater, author; James Alcock; Raymond Moody; Michael Roehm of the Washington Buddhist Vihara; Tom Shroder; Sylvia Browne; Suzane Northrop; Chip Denman, professor of statistics at the University of Maryland.
| 7 | "Foretelling the Future" | February 17, 2003 |
Psychic behavior, palmistry, tarot cards, astrology, and the predictions of Nostradamus.
| 8 | "Mystical Wonders" | February 24, 2003 |
Stonehenge, the Pyramids of Giza, the Nazca Lines in Peru, and crop circles.
