= Science Channel =

American pay television channel

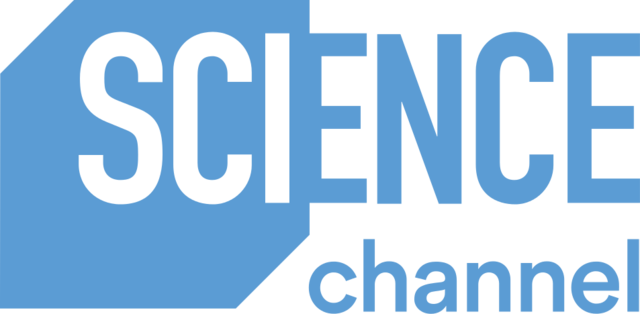
- Logo used since 2016
- Country: United States
- Broadcast area: Nationwide
- Headquarters: Silver Spring, Maryland, U.S.

Programming
- Language: English
- Picture format: 1080i HDTV

Ownership
- Parent: Skydance Corporation
- Sister channels: list of assets owned by Skydance

History
- Launched: October 7, 1996; 30 years ago
- Former names: Quark! (prelaunch, 1994–1996); Discovery Science Network (1996–1998); Discovery Science Channel (1998–2002); The Science Channel (2002–2007)

Links
- Website: Science Channel

Availability

Streaming media
- Affiliated Streaming Service: Discovery+/HBO Max
- Service(s): Philo, DirecTV Stream, Sling TV, Hulu + Live TV, Vidgo

Science Channel (often simply branded as Science; abbreviated to SCI) is an American pay television channel owned by Skydance Corporation. The channel features programming focusing on science related to wilderness survival, engineering, manufacturing, technology, space, space exploration, ufology and prehistory.

As of November 2023, Science Channel is available to approximately 34,000,000 pay television households in the United States-down from its 2013 peak of 78,000,000 households. Along with American Heroes Channel, Boomerang, Cooking Channel, Destination America, Discovery Family, and Discovery Life, Science Channel is among the less prevalent networks of Warner Bros. Discovery.

In recent years, Science Channel has lost carriage with the growth of streaming alternatives including its parent company's HBO Max, and has generally been depreciated by Warner Bros. Discovery in current retransmission consent negotiations with cable and streaming providers. Science Channel is still a major content provider to Discovery+, a sister streaming service to HBO Max.

== History ==
In November 1994, Discovery Networks announced plans for four digital channels set to launch in 1996. Discovery originally named the network under the working title Quark!; this was changed before its launch to the Discovery Science Network. Discovery Science launched in October 1996 as part of the simultaneous rollout of the new channel suite (alongside Discovery Home & Leisure, Discovery Kids and Discovery Civilization). In 2007, adult shows began airing around the clock weekdays, while younger children shows began airing around the clock weeknights.

The channel has undergone various rebrandings throughout its history. Its name was first modified to the Discovery Science Channel in 1998, and then was renamed The Science Channel in 2002, as the first network in the Discovery Networks digital suite to drop the "Discovery" brand from its name (however, international versions of the channel continue to use the "Discovery Science" name). The channel later shortened its name to just Science Channel in 2007 as part of a rebrand that included the introduction of a new logo based on the periodic table; in 2011, the network rebranded as simply Science, introducing a new logo and graphics package designed by Imaginary Forces. In 2008, the channel changed its programming to adult-oriented, and removing all shows for elementary children.

On December 23, 2016, Discovery Communications debuted a new logo for Science after five years. This rebrand was done by Sibling Rivalry, a New York–based design agency.

=== High definition ===
The channel launched a high-definition simulcast feed that broadcasts in 1080i; it was launched on September 1, 2009, along with Discovery Channel HD, TLC HD and Animal Planet HD.

== Programming ==
Science Channel broadcasts a number of science-related television series originally produced by or aired on Discovery Channel, such as Beyond Tomorrow, among others. Discovery Communications has also produced a few programs specifically for Science, such as MegaScience and What The Ancients Knew. Programs from other Discovery Networks channels, PBS and the BBC are either regularly or occasionally aired on the network. Television series produced in the 1990s, such as Discover Magazine and Understanding, are carried on the network's weekday schedule. Science also broadcasts programs such as Moments of Impact and An Idiot Abroad. The channel has experienced some drifting from its intended format throughout its existence, increasingly adding reruns on several science fiction series such as Firefly and Fringe to its schedule in recent years.

=== Series ===
Below is a selected list of Science series.

- Against the Elements
- Alien Encounters
- All-American Makers
- America's Lost Vikings
- Are We Alone?
- BattleBots
- Before We Ruled the Earth
- Beyond Tomorrow
- Black Files Declassified
- Brainiac: Science Abuse
- Brink
- Build It Bigger
- Building Giants
- Building the Ultimate
- Catch It Keep It
- Chaos Caught on Camera
- Close Encounters
- Colossal Construction
- Conspiracies Decoded
- Cooper's Treasures: The Legend Continues
- Cosmic Quantum Ray
- Cosmos: A Personal Voyage
- Curse of the Bermuda Triangle
- Danger by Design
- Dark Matters: Twisted But True
- The Day the Universe Changed
- Deconstructed
- Destroyed in Seconds
- Discover Magazine
- Download – The True Story of the Internet
- Ecotech
- Engineered
- Engineering Catastrophes
- Exodus Earth
- The Explosion Show
- Extreme Engineering
- Extreme Ice Machines
- Extreme Machines
- Factory Made
- Forbidden History
- Firefly (re-runs)
- Fringe (re-runs)
- Futurescape with James Woods
- The Gadget Show
- Head Games
- Head Rush
- How Do They Do It?
- How It's Made (see also List of How It's Made episodes)
- How the Universe Works
- Human Universe
- Hurricane Man
- An Idiot Abroad
- If We Built It Today
- Impossible Engineering
- Impossible Fixes
- Ingenious Minds
- Invention Nation
- It's All Geek to Me
- Junkyard Wars
- Killers of the Cosmos
- Legends of the Deep
- Lost Luggage
- Living with Dinosaurs
- Lost World of Pompeii
- Mammals vs. Dinos
- Mantracker
- Mega Machines
- Meteorite Men
- Miracle Planet
- The Moaning of Life
- Monster Bug Wars
- Monster Ships
- Mummy Mysteries
- Mutant Planet
- Mysteries of the Abandoned
- Mysteries of the Missing
- MythBusters
- MythBusters Jr.
- MythBusters: The Search
- NASA's Unexplained Files
- Oddities
- Outrageous Acts of Psych
- Outrageous Acts of Science
- Paleoworld
- Patent Bending
- Phantom Signals
- The Planets and Beyond
- Popular Science's Future of...
- Prophets of Science Fiction
- Race to Escape
- Raging Planet
- ReGenesis (re-runs)
- Savage Builds
- Sci Fi Science: Physics of the Impossible
- Science of the Movies
- Secret Nazi Ruins
- Secrets of the Underground
- Shipwreck Secrets
- Skyscrapers: Engineering the Future
- Solar Empire
- Space's Deepest Secrets
- Species of Mass Destruction
- Strange Evidence
- Strip the City
- Strip the Cosmos
- Stuck with Hackett
- Stuff You Should Know
- Survivorman
- Terra Nova (re-runs)
- Through the Wormhole (with Morgan Freeman)
- Tomorrow's World Today
- T-Rex: New Science, New Beast
- Tracking Africa's Dinosaurs
- Triassic Giants
- Truth Behind the Moon Landing
- Underground Marvels
- Understanding
- Unearthed
- Unearthing Ancient Secrets
- Unearthing Ancient Secrets 2
- Unearthing Ancient Secrets 3
- Unexplained and Unexplored
- The Unexplained Files
- Utah's Dino Graveyard
- What Could Possibly Go Wrong?
- What on Earth?
- Wonders of the Solar System
- Wonders of the Universe
- World's Strangest

=== Specials and miniseries ===
- 2057 – Predictions on the future technology of the body, city, and the world.
- Base Camp Moon – Returning to the Moon, harvesting Moon dust for oxygen/water, robotics (Robonaut), etc.
- The Challenger Disaster – A biography surrounding the mystery of the titular tragedy, starring William Hurt. Science's first foray into dramatic programming, its premiere on the channel will be simulcast on sister network Discovery Channel.
- The Critical Eye – An eight-part series examining pseudoscientific and paranormal phenomena.
- Dinosaur Revolution – A four-part miniseries on the natural history of dinosaurs. The last two episodes were planned to air on Discovery Channel, but a last-minute schedule change landed them on Science.
- Exploring Time – A two-hour television documentary miniseries about natural time scale changes
- Extreme Smuggling
- Futurecar – New technology may be used to create advanced cars and sometimes funny cars in the future.
- Hawking – About the early work of British theoretical physicist Stephen Hawking.
- Hubble Live – Launch of Space Shuttle Atlantis on NASA's Servicing Mission 4 (HST-SM4), the eleven-day fifth and final mission to repair the Hubble Space Telescope
- A Life In Memory – An hour-long documentary about Memories, and PTSD and the ways they effect our lives. "Barney recalls the day he was hit by a car: his back was broken, and his wife was killed. Today, he will be given a pill to erase the memory of that tragic day for good. At a treatment center in Montreal, PTSD patients are given a second chance at life."
- Lost Luggage – Rebroadcasts of An Idiot Abroad episodes from previous seasons, each including two new "Lost Luggage" segments filmed at Ricky Gervais' home in England in which Gervais and Karl Pilkington hold brief discussions.
- Mars Rising – A six-part series on possible future missions to Mars.
- NextWorld – Predicting the future of the world, humanity, and life.
- Outlaw Tech
- Perfect Disaster – Predicting violent natural disasters that could happen in the near future.
- Prophets of Science Fiction – Biographies of some of the greatest science fiction authors.
- Punkin Chunkin – A one-hour condensed version of the World Championship punkin chunkin contest in Sussex County, Delaware. Traditionally aired on Thanksgiving.
- Science of Star Wars – Explains how the cutting edge technology of Star Wars might be useful and possible to implement in everyday life.
- Tank on the Moon – Concentrates on Russian attempts to launch an unmanned rover to the Moon before the successful American Apollo program.
- Uncovering Aliens - 2013 mini series of 4 episodes.
- What the Ancients Knew – Rediscovered innovations of the ancient world.
- The Planets (1999 TV series)
- The Planets and Beyond

== International ==
There are international versions of Science in Southeast Asia, Europe, France, United Kingdom, Italy, India, Sweden, Turkey, Canada, Latin America and Australia. The channels are branded Discovery Science and do not broadcast all of the same shows as the US channel.

== See also ==
- List of documentary channels
- Discovery Science (disambiguation)#TV channels
