= My Shocking Story =

Television Documentary Series

My Shocking Story is a documentary television series originally broadcast in 2008 on Discovery Channel UK. It was broadcast by The Learning Channel in the United States, Discovery Channel Australia and Seven Network in Australia and Discovery Channel Italy in Italy. The series documents unusual or shocking medical ailments and conditions.

== Episodes ==
=== Series One ===
- "Half-Man Half-tree
- "World's Fattest Kids"
- "My Big Foot"
- "The Man With No Face"
- "World's Smallest Mom"
- "World's Smallest Kids"

=== Series Two ===
- "Octoboy"
- "Human Spider Sisters", about the Spider Girls, conjoined twins from India
- "Treeman Meets Treeman"
- "World's Tallest Giants"
- "Albino Crisis"
- "Giant Head"
- "Treeman: Search for The Cure"
- "Human Face Transplant"
- "Real Wolf Kids"
- "Octopus Man"
- "Electric Human"
- "Freak Show Family"
- "Coma Miracle"
- "Burnt And Survived"
- "Which Sex Am I?"
- "World's Heaviest Man"
- "Reconstruct My Face"
- "Can't Stop Growing"
- "Rewire My Brain"
- "Save Me Before I'm Born"
- "Sleep Sex"

== Reception ==
Laura Brown of the Sunday Times called the series "spectacular as it chronicles the lives of patients with unusual medical conditions". The Age television critic Brad Newsome praised as "wonderful" the moments during which Dede and Zainal, two people afflicted with warts, meet. Kerrie Murphy of The Australian said the show "handl[es] the topics with the sort of sensitivity unexpected from a show with that title" and called it an "affecting documentary".
