= Spider Girls =

Bengali conjoined twins

Ganga and Jamuna Mondal
- Born: Ayara and Jayara Ratun; 1969 (age 56–57) or 1970 (age 55–56); Basirhat, West Bengal, India
- Citizenship: Indian
- Employer: Dreamland Circus
- Known for: Being conjoined twins
- Spouse: Gadadhar
- Children: 1 (deceased)

Ganga and Jamuna Mondal (born Ayara and Jayara Ratun, 1969 or 1970), known professionally as The Spider Girls and The Spider Sisters, are conjoined twins from a Bengali family in Basirhat, West Bengal, India.

== Employment ==
They work at the travelling "Dreamland Circus" in India. Their act consists of them sitting on a charpoy in a tent, with paying spectators allowed entry to view and converse with them. In 2009, they were reported to have earned GBP26 for five hours a night. They are married to a single man named Gadadhar, a carnival worker.

== Anatomy ==
The twins are joined at the abdomen and pelvis, have four arms, and three legs, two of which are fused into a single, nine-toed limb, which remains concealed behind their body. They share a stomach, but have two hearts, two kidneys, one liver, and one reproductive tract.

The twins have been examined by doctors to determine whether or not they can be separated. However, they have no plans to do so because they feel it would be against God's will, carry too great a medical risk, and would rob them of their employment. They have said, "We are happy as we are. The family will starve if we are separated."

== Personal life ==
The twins were born Ayara and Jayara Ratun, but their parents changed their names at the age of five to honour the Ganga and Jamuna rivers.

Although they both have separate ration cards, they share the same plate at meals. They each vote separately in elections, but when they attempted to open a joint bank account, they were refused.

In 1993, they gave birth to a daughter by Caesarean section, but she died hours after being born.

== In the media ==
- "Human Spider Sisters", My Shocking Story, a documentary series
- "An Idiot Abroad": Season 3, Episodes 2 & 3
