= List of An Idiot Abroad episodes =

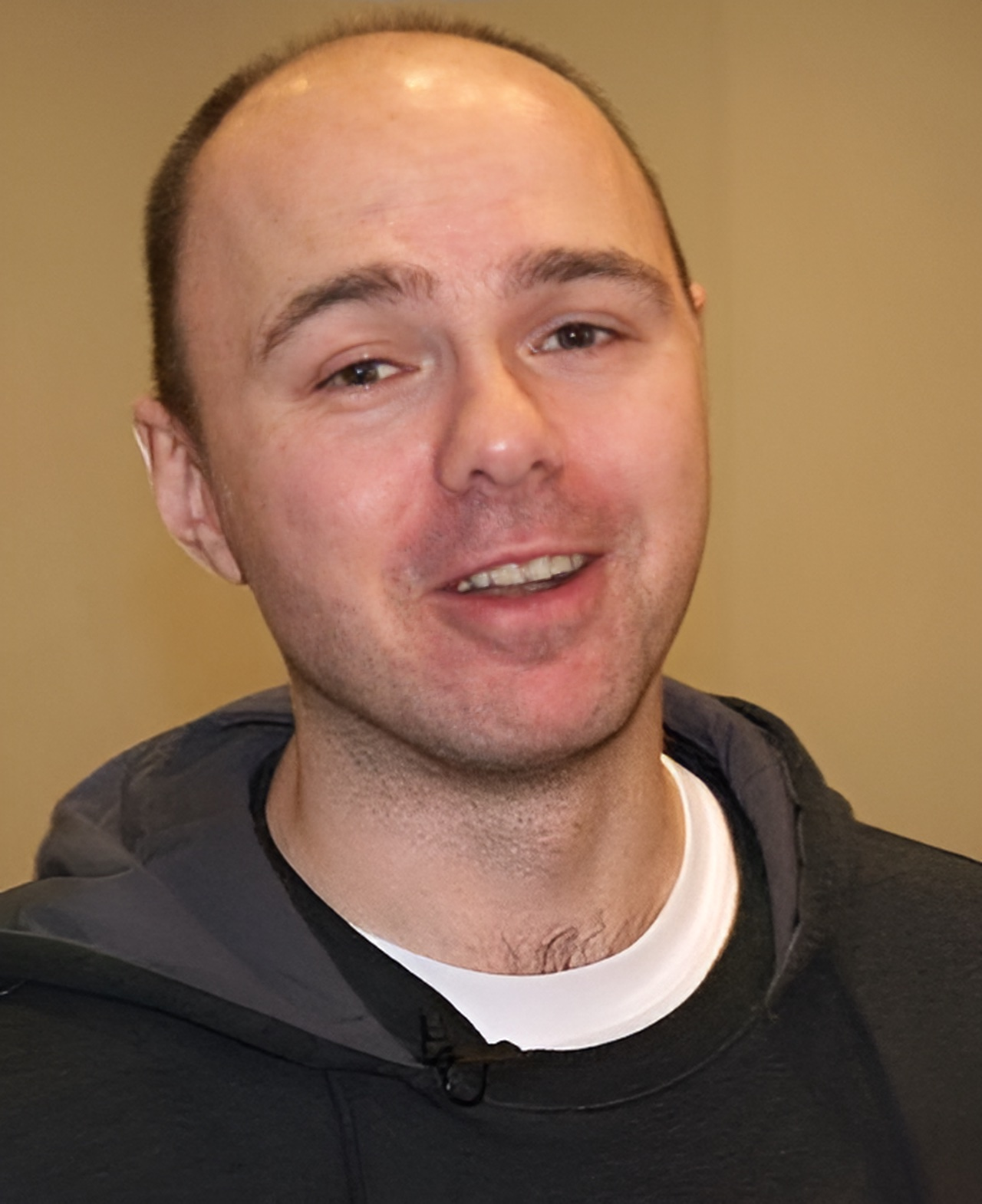
The series features Karl Pilkington as he travels around the world.

An Idiot Abroad is a travel documentary television series that was originally broadcast on Sky1 in the United Kingdom. The programme was created by and features Karl Pilkington and his former radio show colleagues Ricky Gervais and Stephen Merchant. As of 21 December 2012, 20 episodes of An Idiot Abroad had aired over three series.

The first series aired between 23 September and 11 November 2010 and centred on Pilkington's journeys to the New Seven Wonders of the World (excluding the Colosseum, which was replaced by the Great Pyramids); it ran for eight episodes. In the second series, which aired 23 September – 11 November 2011, Pilkington participates in several popular "bucket list" activities, such as swimming with dolphins and climbing Mount Fuji; it also ran for eight episodes. A third series, a three-part special titled The Short Way Round, aired 30 November – 21 December 2012; in it, Karl was accompanied by Warwick Davis, who stars in Gervais's situation comedy show Life's Too Short, on a trip loosely recreating Marco Polo's 13th-century journey from Venice to China. Stephen Merchant did not participate in the third series.

The first two series have been released on DVD in Regions 1, 2, and 4. The third series has been released on DVD only in Region 2.

In February 2013, Science, which broadcast all three series in North America, began rebroadcasting episodes of An Idiot Abroad under the title An Idiot Abroad: Lost Luggage. Each Lost Luggage episode consists of the original episode and two brief, new "Lost Luggage" segments filmed at Gervais's home in England which were not included in the original episode. In each "Lost Luggage" segment, Gervais and Pilkington hold a short discussion.

== Series overview ==
Series	Episodes	Originally released	
Series	Episodes	First released	Last released
1	8	23 September 2010	11 November 2010
2	8	23 September 2011	11 November 2011
3	4	30 November 2012	21 December 2012

== Episodes ==
=== Series 1: The 7 Wonders (2010) ===
No. overall	No. in series	Title	Directed by	Original release date	UK viewers (millions)
1	1	"China"	Krishnendu Majumdar	23 September 2010	1.24
Gervais and Merchant send Pilkington to China with the goal of seeing the Great Wall. Pilkington lands in Beijing but is unimpressed by the pollution and a population that does not speak English. He wanders the streets and is repulsed by the different types of food as well as its door-less public restroom stalls. He meets a fortune teller, gets a fire-based massage, and participates in Shaolin Kung Fu. At the Great Wall, he receives a call from Merchant who insists that he travel the entire length of the wall.
2	2	"India"	Luke Campbell and Krishnendu Majumdar	30 September 2010	1.38
Pilkington's next Wonder to visit is the Taj Mahal in India. He rides down the middle of a busy highway in a cycle rickshaw. He is about to stay the night in a shop stall but his hosts place him in an apartment bedroom. He encounters a religious festival known as Holi day, where he is pelted with coloured paint powder. He attends the Kumbh Mela festival where he visits the religious Babas who practice extreme forms of yoga, such as being naked with strange piercings. He tries the lotus position, and visits a Baba who has had his right arm raised for the past twelve years. He meets with the Elephant Baba, who has a deformed face that is in the shape of an elephant on one side, and his assistant who winds his genitals around a walking stick and bounces. He meets an American Hindu acolyte who brings him to a Hindu holy man. He bathes with them in the River Ganges. On his way to Agra he visits a cow sanctuary. He is later stationed in an inn "nearby" the Taj Mahal, but is disappointed by the filthiness of its honeymoon suite. The next morning, he visits the Taj Mahal and also sees the wonder from a small boat.
3	3	"Jordan"	Luke Campbell and Krishnendu Majumdar	7 October 2010	1.85
Pilkington intends to go to Petra in Jordan, but first makes a stop in Israel. He visits the Wailing Wall in Jerusalem. He gets abducted, but it is a simulation; the group then teaches him kidnap survival training. He shares a lift with a group of Na Nachs who jump out at street stops and dance. He crosses over to Palestine where he visits the Church of the Nativity in Bethlehem. He visits the Dead Sea where he enjoys floating around until somebody's "goz" gets stuck in his navel. Later on, he goes to Jordan where he rides a camel for eight hours and spends time in a Bedouin settlement where they prepare lamb eyeballs and testicles for dinner. He forgoes more camel riding and arrives at Petra where he stays the night in one of the caves nearby.
4	4	"Mexico"	Jamie Jay Johnson and Krishnendu Majumdar	14 October 2010	1.65
Pilkington visits Mexico to see Chichen Itza. He arrives in Mexico City on Good Friday, and attends a recreation of the crucifixion of Jesus. He begins a quest for Mexican jumping beans but cannot find any locals who have heard of them. He undergoes professional wrestling training. He visits a colorful cemetery. On Easter Sunday, he gets caught up in a Burning of Judas festival where he runs in terror. (Note: In the Burning of Judas festival that Pilkington observes, people carry paper mache animals, such as frogs or bulls, that represent Judas Iscariot and "bad things". They then attach fireworks to the animals, light them, and run through the streets. Pilkington runs in terror and tries to hide.) At a ranch, he meets up with charros where he rides a horse, drinks tequila and eats the worm. They want him to ride a bull, but he refuses. He meets up with some descendants of the Mayans who built the temples; he helps them knock down a wasp nest to harvest its larvae, which they then share with him in tortillas. He sees Chichen Itza at sunrise, but it fails to impress him. He feeds Hobnob biscuits to a lizard, and fields a cell phone call from his girlfriend, who asks him how to operate the DVD player. He observes medical personnel as they attend to a woman who has fainted. After leaving Chichen Itza, he reports that he enjoyed his visit because of the free spirit of the Mexican people, but is disappointed that he could not find Mexican jumping beans.
5	5	"Egypt"	Krishnendu Majumdar	21 October 2010	1.62
Pilkington visits Egypt to see the Great Pyramids. He wanders the streets of Cairo, where he gets swarmed in a market by pushy restaurant salesmen. He goes to the Pyramids on camelback, but his visit is ruined by poor visibility. He receives a lesson in how to barter with Egyptians, then is bored by a visit to the Museum of Egyptian Antiquities, after which he has lunch at a deaf KFC. He then takes a cruise on the Nile and visits a couple who believe that the Pyramids were built by extraterrestrials. Finally, he returns to the Pyramids, and this time succeeds in seeing them.
6	6	"Brazil"	Krishnendu Majumdar	28 October 2010	1.54
Pilkington goes to Rio de Janeiro to see the towering statue of Christ the Redeemer. His visit to Brazil coincides with Carnival, which he finds too noisy, crowded, and stressful. He attends a block party, learns to dance, and marches in a parade. He then meets his guide, Celso, who takes him for a Brazilian wax and assists him in shopping for ultra-tight Brazilian beachwear before taking him to a gay beach. Finding his accommodations – an overcrowded hostel in which guests sleep together dormitory-style – unacceptable, Pilkington agrees to spend the night at Celso's home, where Celso dresses as a female impersonator. Pilkington then seeks peace and quiet at a secluded beach, only to discover that it is a nude beach. Eventually he fulfills the main goal of his trip, visiting the statue of Christ The Redeemer on foot and then taking a helicopter tour.
7	7	"Peru"	Krishnendu Majumdar and Richard Yee	4 November 2010	1.92
Pilkington goes to Peru to see the pre-Columbian Incan site known as Machu Picchu, an "Old Mountain" perched on a mountain ridge above the Urubamba Valley. First, however, Gervais and Merchant send him on a three-day trip in the Amazon Basin, where he camps, travels by boat, is frightened and annoyed by the presence of insects and dangerous creatures, and tries to feed a biscuit to a large boa constrictor. He also spends time with a tribe of former cannibals, with whom he practices throwing arrows. He complains that Sir David Attenborough mostly hosts television nature documentaries with voiceovers made in the comfort of a studio in London rather than experiencing the danger and discomfort of traveling and camping in the wild himself, and wonders why he (Pilkington) could not do the same thing for An Idiot Abroad episodes. Finally, he embarks on the 11-hour hike up to Machu Picchu, during which he is serenaded by his guides. After eight hours of hiking, he gives up about three-quarters of the way to Machu Picchu, and instead provides a voice-over where he spoofs Attenborough as the episode ends with film of the ancient city taken by his camera crew.
8	8	"Karl Comes Home"	Krishnendu Majumdar	11 November 2010	1.60
Pilkington meets with Ricky Gervais and Stephen Merchant to discuss his travels and the possibility of a second series. He also recreates his favourite travels, which are those he took to a holiday park in Wales as a child.

=== Series 2: The Bucket List (2011) ===
No. overall	No. in series	Title	Directed by	Original release date	UK viewers (millions)
9	1	"Desert Island"	Luke Campbell	23 September 2011	2.66
Karl Pilkington goes to the South Pacific to spend time alone on a "desert island." On his way there, he attempts bungee jumping in New Zealand but chickens out. He then goes to Vanuatu where the locals perform land diving, and opts to perform his jump from the lowest bar. He also tries arse boarding, (Note: Pilkington describes arse boarding: "They'd sit on a type of homemade ski and then slide down the side of the ash-covered volcano as if it were snow". Pilkington, Karl (2012). The Further Adventures of An Idiot Abroad. Canongate Books. ISBN 9780857867513.) meets a tribe that worships Prince Philip, and interacts with another primitive tribe, dancing with them while wearing a jockstrap decorated with foliage before spending a night alone on an island in Vanuatu.
10	2	"Trans-Siberian Express"	Richard Yee	30 September 2011	2.20
Pilkington's second "thing to do" is to travel on the Trans-Siberian Express which departs from Moscow, Russia. While he expects a luxury "Orient Express" experience, Ricky Gervais and Stephen Merchant have other ideas: Pilkington is moved to the Third Class passenger cabin. Along the way, Gervais and Merchant have him stop by a cosmonaut training facility where he endures a centrifuge and prepares for a reduced gravity airplane flight. He also visits a group of locals whose relaxation method is to bury him alive and give him only an airtube for breathing. Then he passes through Mongolia where he must wrestle in place of a village local for their Nadaam festival. He eventually ends up in China, his "least-favourite place" from the last series, but he enjoys his visit to a dwarf village. (Note: Actor Warwick Davis makes a guest "appearance" where he talks to Pilkington on the phone. He is offended that Pilkington enjoyed the dwarf village in China.)
11	3	"Swim with Dolphins"	Luke Campbell	7 October 2011	2.23
Pilkington heads off to Australia to swim with dolphins. Before he reaches Australia, Gervais and Merchant plan a stopover in Thailand, in time for one of their water festivals. He is given a makeover by some ladyboys of Thailand. He then trains with a Muay Thai kickboxing group and later participates in a blindfolded match. He gets a massage from a women's prison inmate. He also visits a hospital museum, and a King Cobra Village to hang out and eat with the locals. He visits a monkey park where he loses his snacks right away. When Pilkington finally goes to Australia, Gervais and Merchant decide that swimming with dolphins is too boring so they have him go in a shark cage where he encounters great white sharks.
12	4	"Whale Watching"	Richard Yee	14 October 2011	2.25
Pilkington heads to Alaska to go whale watching. He is not prepared for the arctic conditions there. Gervais and Merchant have planned some snow hiking and dog sledding for him. He rides with an ice road trucker to the northernmost city in the United States, Barrow, where he meets with the Inuit. They feed him bowhead whale meat and take him for a snowmobile ride to visit Point Barrow, the northernmost point in Alaska, where he sees the icebound seacoast. He then assists a local truck driver in Barrow who collects the contents of the local residents' chemical toilets. He sees glaciers up close by swimming in ice-cold water. When Pilkington finally gets to catch his whale-watching cruise, he learns that Gervais and Merchant have stuck him on a deep-sea fishing trawler, where he gets so seasick he does not care about seeing the whales while the rest of the crew point them out.
13	5	"Meet a Gorilla"	Luke Campbell and Benjamin Green	21 October 2011	2.18
Pilkington heads to Africa to meet a gorilla in its natural habitat. Before he travels to Uganda, Pilkington agrees to start in South Africa, as he has been there on holiday before. Gervais and Merchant want Pilkington to have an authentic African experience, so they arrange some time for him to help a charity rebuild a hut. Pilkington also visits some cooling towers in Soweto where Gervais and Merchant offer to buy some huts if he bungee jumps off the tower, but Pilkington negotiates that he will buy them if he doesn't. Pilkington lies and tells Gervais and Merchant that he did the jump. Pilkington visits a family who has a pet hippopotamus named Jessica. Pilkington visits a local tribe and prepares a meal for their king and his entourage. Pilkington goes on safari with a guide who checks the droppings of various animals by tasting them, and helps a conservation team relocate a male rhinoceros. Pilkington then goes on a long hike through the Bwindi Impenetrable Forest in Uganda before eventually coming "face-to-face" with a mountain gorilla. After the return trek, he confesses to Gervais that he lied about the bungee jump.
14	6	"Route 66"	Jamie Jay Johnson	28 October 2011	2.20
Pilkington chooses to drive along the legendary Route 66 in the United States in an open-top Cadillac, but Gervais and Merchant place him in a Smart Car. Along the way, they make him participate on-stage with a Glee-styled high school choir, (Note: The original transmission of the "Route 66" episode showed Karl as a lead performer for Van Halen's song "Jump", but due to rights issues, this was cut from the U.S. broadcast. Gervais stated "Van Halen are trying to put a stop on it, because [Pilkington's performance] is that bad. But Sky have got a blanket agreement so we can put it out in England...but we can't put it out in America or on the DVD." The video was replaced by a previously cut scene where the troupe performs The Police's "Every Little Thing She Does Is Magic" instead. Karl does not have a solo spot on this performance, but humour is derived from his inability to keep in sync with the other performers.) hang out with New Age therapists in a cuddle party, prospect for gold, ride a monster truck, and visit an Amish family. His final task is to ride on top of a plane, which Pilkington initially refuses, but his other option is to dress up and dance at the International Mr. Leather convention in Chicago. Pilkington chooses the plane.
15	7	"Climb Mount Fuji"	Jamie Jay Johnson	4 November 2011	2.66
Pilkington's last "thing to do" is to climb Japan's most spiritual destination: Mount Fuji. On arrival in Japan, Pilkington visits a cat café and later visits a sumo wrestling stable and participates in training. He gets lost as he tries to find his hotel room. Gervais and Merchant put him up in a capsule hotel. The next day, they also have him do morning exercises with the factory workers, visit some stores, and then head out to meet a Zen Buddhist monk and do temple duties. He also tries out traditional sushi, and has a good look at Mount Fuji while on the world's steepest rollercoaster. Pilkington then makes the long trek up Mount Fuji where he gets an inspiration for an invention: Pilko Pants, inflatable trousers which make it more comfortable to sit on hard or cold surfaces.
16	8	"Karl Comes Home"	Krishnendu Majumdar	11 November 2011	2.30
Pilkington returns home and discusses and reviews his travels with Gervais and Merchant again. He agrees to take a prostate exam (which was also used as an incentive to get people to watch the series on Science). He also talks about what kind of superhero he would be, answers some viewer questions, and shows Merchant his new invention, Pilko Pants.

=== Series 3: The Short Way Round (2012) ===
The special was split into four parts, and aired at the end of 2012.

No. overall	No. in series	Title	Directed by	Original release date	UK viewers (millions)
17	1	"Venice & Macedonia"	Richard Yee	30 November 2012	2.24
Pilkington is joined by Warwick Davis as they begin their adventure – a loose recreation of Marco Polo's 13th-century journey from Italy to China – in Venice. After visiting a square where Davis feeds pigeons and gets gelatos, they go to a costume shop where they dress up for a masquerade ball event later that day. While Davis enjoys the role-playing, Pilkington becomes annoyed. In one of the masquerade events, they are blindfolded and presented with various smells and tastes. The next day, Pilkington tries out a water jet pack, but fails to get out of the water. They travel to Skopje, Macedonia, where they spend an evening with Romani gypsies. They take part in a Sufi religious ceremony. Pilkington attempts to ride some tethered helium balloons but is too heavy; he has Davis ride them, which Gervais finds not as funny.
18	2	"India"	Luke Campbell	7 December 2012	2.06
Pilkington and Davis continue in Marco Polo's footsteps by traveling to India. In Mumbai, Pilkington and Davis visit a laughter yoga gathering, and participate in a Bollywood film called Chingari. (Note: The Chingari Pilkington and Davis participated in is a Bhojpuri film and is not the same Chingari film released in 2012 that stars Darshan.) They travel to Varanasi by train, and take a boat cruise on the River Ganges where they observe the custom of cremation on the river. They plan to camp out to watch the sunrise, but Pilkington gets so annoyed by a raving local that they leave for a hotel. The next morning, they return to witness the sunrise over the Ganges. They visit South Kolkata, West Bengal, to participate in a circus. After their performance, Pilkington insists that they visit the Spider Girls, who are conjoined twins in Siliguri, West Bengal. Davis and Gervais are concerned that Pilkington may say something insensitive to the girls.
19	3	"China"	Luke Campbell	14 December 2012	2.26
The episode begins with Pilkington and Davis still in India. Pilkington takes the Spider Girls to their performance where they are displayed as biological rarities. He sits with the girls and insists that Davis join him, which Davis eventually does while an appreciative crowd applauds – much to Pilkington's amusement but Davis's dismay. They then complete Marco Polo's journey by flying to China and boarding a boat at Chongqing for a cruise on the Yangtze River. Davis gets a private cabin, but Pilkington has to share one with noisy Chinese musicians. They visit one of the Sichuan Giant Panda Sanctuaries to see the giant pandas, but the staff enhances their experience by having them dress up in giant panda costumes to mingle with the animals. At Chengdu, they ride a boat in a park and have their ears cleaned, and Pilkington tries to make Davis eat exotic Sichuan cuisine. They climb the steps of Mount Emei, one of the four sacred Buddhist mountains; Davis comes down with a painful sinusitis attack during the climb, but he makes it to the top with Pilkington's encouragement. Rounding out the trip, they take a ferryboat from Hong Kong to Macau and stay at the Venetian Macao hotel, where they ride in a gondola on the hotel's canal much as people do where they began their journey in Venice. They stop by the Macau Tower, where Pilkington thinks he is just heading to a nice dinner in the restaurant on the top floor of the tower, not knowing that Gervais has texted Davis and told Davis it is up to him to get Pilkington to engage in the extreme activities also available at the top of the tower, such as bungee jumping. Pilkington and Davis participate in the tower's "Skywalk X", where they hang over and walk along the tower's outside rim. Davis does the "Sky Jump", a controlled descent to the ground, but Pilkington chickens out. The episode ends with a montage of scenes of Pilkington and Davis together in Venice, Macedonia, India, and China during their journey while the romantic song "Somewhere" from West Side Story plays on the soundtrack.
20	4	"A Commentary"	Luke Campbell	21 December 2012	0.77
Gervais joins Pilkington and Davis for an audio commentary on Episode 3 ("China"). (Note: Science did not broadcast Episode 4 during the third series' premiere run in North America in January–February 2013, however it did broadcast the commentary in March with the Lost Luggage episodes.)

=== Lost Luggage (2013) ===
Rebroadcasts in North America on Science of episodes from previous series, each including two new "Lost Luggage" segments filmed at Gervais's home in England in which Gervais and Pilkington hold brief discussions.

No.	Title	Directed by	Original release date
1	"Karl Pilkington's Greatest Journeys: India"	Luke Campbell and Krishnendu Majumdar	9 February 2013
A rebroadcast of Episode Two from Series One ("India"), documenting Pilkington's journey to see the Taj Mahal. In the two new "Lost Luggage" segments, Gervais and Pilkington discuss criticism of Science for broadcasting An Idiot Abroad because of the show's lack of scientific merit; in the other, they discuss Gervais's collection of globes and Pilkington's belief that globes are impractical because it is too hard to carry them along to use while traveling.
2	"Karl Pilkington's Greatest Journeys: Mexico"	Jamie Jay Johnson and Krishnendu Majumdar	16 February 2013
A rebroadcast of Episode Four from Series One ("Mexico"), documenting Pilkington's journey to see Chichen Itza. In the first new "Lost Luggage" segment, Gervais and Pilkington introduce themselves to the television audience and disagree on the proper way for television personalities to introduce themselves; in the second, they discuss the role of bees in sniffing out bombs at airports and debate whether the bees have adapted to take on this new role.
3	"Karl Pilkington's Greatest Journeys: Jordan"	Luke Campbell and Krishnendu Majumdar	23 February 2013
A rebroadcast of Episode Three from Series One ("Jordan"), documenting Pilkington's journey to see Petra. In the first new "Lost Luggage" segment, Gervais and Pilkington discuss their friendship, which Pilkington compares to the relationship he once had with a pet magpie. In the second one, Pilkington provides his opinion on which Internet sites should be retained and which done away with, adding that he believes the content of YouTube requires more oversight.
4	"Karl Pilkington's Greatest Journeys: Whale Watching"	Richard Yee	2 March 2013
A rebroadcast of Episode Four from Series Two ("Whale Watching"), documenting Pilkington's journey to Alaska to go whale-watching. In the first new "Lost Luggage" segment, Gervais and Pilkington discuss a caterpillar that hibernates for 20 years at time and how strange it would be to live that way. In the second one, they debate the extent to which learning is worth the effort.
?	"Karl Pilkington's Greatest Journeys: 7 Wonders"	Krishnendu Majumdar	Offered on Demand
A rebroadcast of Episode Eight from Season Two ("Karl Comes Home"), in which Gervais, Merchant, and Pilkington discuss Pilkington's travels during Season Two. In the first new "Lost Luggage" segment, Gervais and Pilkington discuss the "best thing" Pilkington has learned during his travels, which Pilkington decides is "don't go to Russia." In the second one, they role-play a scene in which Pilkington plays an 8-year-old talking to Gervais, who plays an elderly man who is a "broken-down bum;" Pilkington wants to know where the elderly man receives his mail.
?	"Karl Pilkington's Greatest Journeys: Route 66"	Jamie Jay Johnson	Offered on Demand
A rebroadcast of Episode Six from Season Two ("Route 66"), in which Pilkington travels along Route 66 in the United States. In the first new "Lost Luggage" segment, Gervais and Pilkington discuss the first time they met, and Pilkington describes having Gervais as a friend as "tiresome." In the second one, they agree that they do not understand modern fashion.

== Notes ==
- Episode viewing figures from BARB.
