= Coco (robot) =

Humanoid robot by the Massachusetts Institute of Technology

Coco is the latest platform at the Massachusetts Institute of Technology's Humanoid Robotics Group, and a successor to Cog. Unlike previous platforms, Coco is built along more ape-like lines, rather than human. Coco is also notable for being mobile. Although there is ongoing research on the robot, the group has many robots dealing with human interactions. The Humanoid Robotics Group has planned to add more useful functions in the future, but have not set an exact date for such project.

== Humanoid Robotics Group mission ==
The mission of the Humanoid Robotics Group is to create a robot that can interact with humans and objects without being dependent on a caretaker. Coco should be able to investigate environments and be able to discover important outlooks of the world. Using multiple sensors, Coco should be conducive to human interaction. Interactions with humans include:

- reacting to others' emotions
- showing empathy
- non-aggressive social behavior
- independence

== Physical ==
All the following dimensions of Coco are in millimeters:

- length of the head is 165
- width of the head is 140
- from left shoulder Y-axis to right shoulder Y-axis is 252
- from shoulder Y-axis to shoulder X-axis is 58
- from hip to hip is 269
- from hip to shoulder 292
- forearm is 156
- upper arm is 154
- upper leg is 65
- lower leg is 45

Coco's appearance is ape-like, which coincides with early evolutionary behaviors. It has broad shoulders, short legs, and long arms made of carbon fiber. The robot's color is all black except for the head which is clear and has two colored eyes with cameras that indicate objects near it. The cords connecting the back of the head to the body are used for transmitting codes for movements and reactions.

Coco is a fifteen DOF (degrees of freedom) quadruped with gorilla-like proportions. DOF is the number of independent conditions that define Coco's arrangement. The DOF are located all throughout the robot. There are two DOF per hind leg, one on the hip, another at the knee, three in each front limb, two on the shoulder, and one on the elbow. The head has an additional five DOF for the movement of the object. Coco can change postures and its vestibular system allows it to have its eye ground level to see objects in a small radius. It has a high speed serial cable that links the robot to the main controller.

The controlling method is called torque-position control, which is the force applied to a lever in a rotation. The method most similar to the torque control is the Series Elastic Actuators, "springs that are intentionally placed in series between the motor and actuator output to have a constant force" but that method powers the elastic element. Most of the above methods are useful but the least useful is the elastic element.

== Uses ==
Coco is controlled through many sensors to walk and be aware of the objects in its perimeter. For future uses, Coco will be able to be aware of others emotions and produce a reaction. Coco will also be able to help different types of learning and interact with humans or objects that need its help.

== Future work ==
The aim for the Humanoid Robotics Group is for Coco to have many human-like experiences through common sense, emotions, and visuals. The Humanoid Robotics Group plans to contribute more work to Coco such as: providing the robot with high level functions to develop interactive behaviors, providing aid for some types of learning, providing an improvement in the force control, and providing hand-eye coordination. It is planned that in the near future, Coco should be able to be aware of its own body, have flexible limb dynamics, and be able to interact with humans without it being controlled.

== Related robots from the HRG ==
The links below are websites to robots that the Humanoid Robotics Group has been involved with. These projects are similar to Coco but have different body structures and postures.

- Cog - motor dynamics that are similar to humans
- Kismet - human communication skills
- Macaco - reacts to its surrounding
- Retired robots include:
  - Wheelesley
  - Pebbles
  - Boadicea
  - Polly
  - Modots
  - Ants
  - Hannibal and Attila
  - Genghis
