= Exploring Time =

Exploring Time is a two-hour TV documentary mini-series about natural time scale changes that aired in 2007 on The Science Channel.

The documentary is a co-production of Twin Cities Public Television, Red Hill Studios, and NHK. It was made possible by a major grant from the National Science Foundation, and produced in association with Arte France and Granada International.

== Part/Hour 1 ==
- Introduction to Timescales: Days to Decades
- Decades to Centuries
- Centuries to Thousand of Years
- Thousands of Years to Millions of Years
- Millions to 100's [sic] of Millions of Years
- 100's [sic] of Millions of Years
- Billions of Years, The Lifespan of the Universe

== Part/Hour 2 ==
- Introduction to Smaller and Smaller Timescales
- Human Perception of Time, From Days to Hours
- Hours to seconds
- Seconds to Tenths of Seconds
- Tenths of Seconds to Milliseconds
- Milliseconds to Microseconds
- Microseconds to Nanoseconds
- Nanoseconds to Attoseconds
- Attoseconds to Planck Time
- Planck Time, the Shortest Timescale Imaginable
