= Prophets of Science Fiction =

- Genre: Documentary; Science fiction
- Directed by: Declan Whitebloom
- Narrated by: Jonathan Adams
- Country of origin: United States
- Original language: English
- No. of seasons: 1
- No. of episodes: 8

Production
- Executive producers: Ridley Scott; Gary Auerbach; Julie Auerbach; Henry Capanna; Mary Lisio; David Cargill; David W. Zucker
- Producers: Chris Chaffin; Joseph Peicott; Kevin Tavolaro; Amy Cron; Simon Brown; Charlie Cook
- Running time: 45 minutes

Original release
- Network: Science
- Release: November 9, 2011 – March 7, 2012

Prophets of Science Fiction is an American documentary television series produced and hosted by Ridley Scott for the Science Channel. The program premiered on November 9, 2011.

The series covers the life and work of leading science fiction authors of the last couple of centuries. It depicts how they predicted and, accordingly, influenced the development of scientific advancements by inspiring many readers to assist in transforming those futuristic visions into everyday reality. The stories are told through film clips, reenactments, illustrations and interviews.

The first episode received mixed reviews. Commentators appreciated the approach of combining coverage of contemporary scientific research and biographical exposition, but criticized the series as "light on the substance and heavy on the exaggeration". The series' attempts to link Mary Shelley's Frankenstein to developments such as organ transplants, supercomputers and DNA research were described by one critic as far-fetched but by another as successful.

== List of episodes ==
The series' first season consists of 8 one-hour episodes which aired on the Science Channel in November 2011 and February 2012.

No.	Subject	Air date
1	Mary Shelley	9 November 2011
2	Philip K. Dick	16 November 2011
3	H. G. Wells	23 November 2011
4	Arthur C. Clarke	30 November 2011
5	Isaac Asimov	15 February 2012
6	Jules Verne	22 February 2012
7	Robert Heinlein	29 February 2012
8	George Lucas	7 March 2012
