= Discovery Science Place =

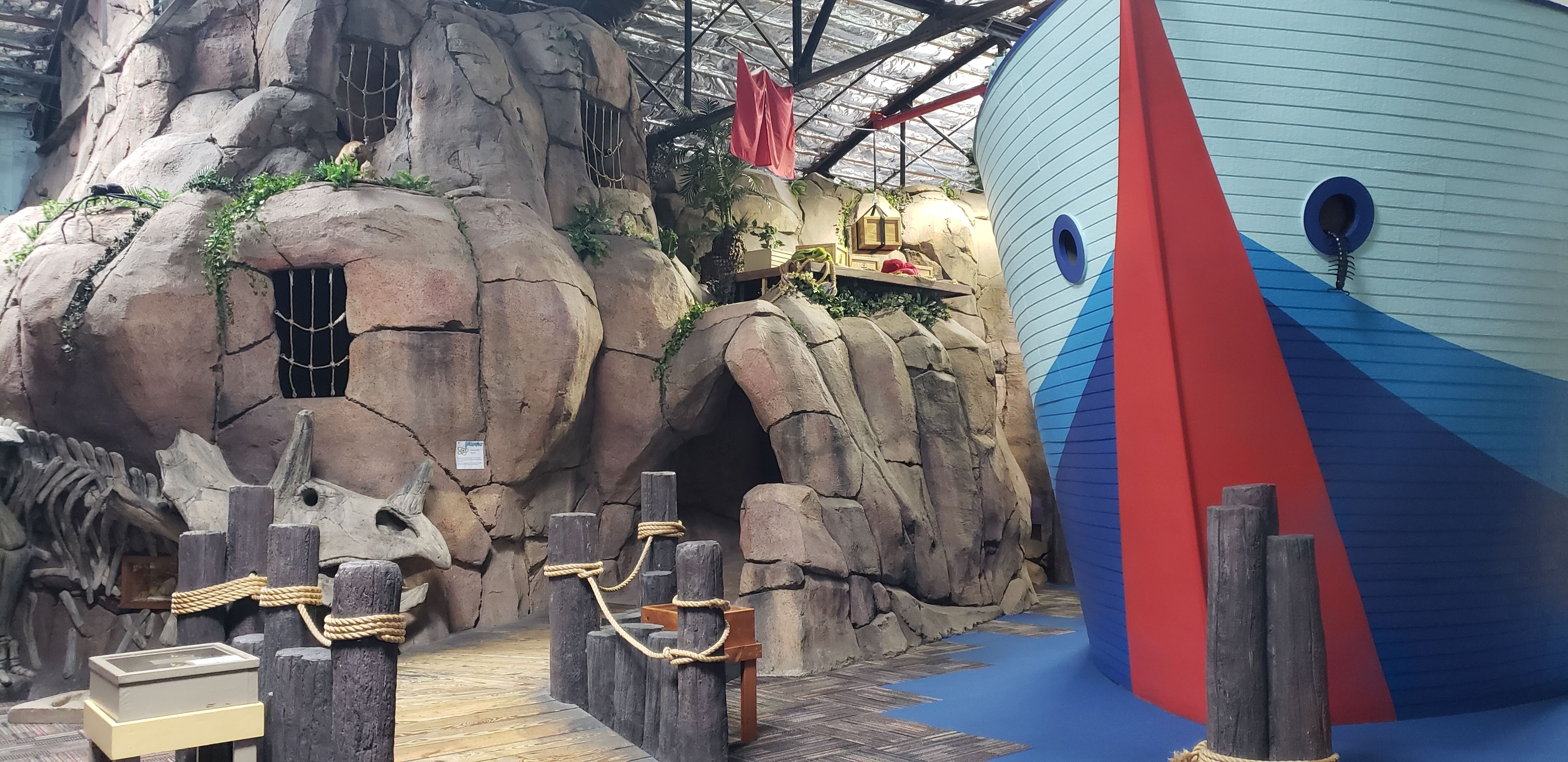
- Entryway to Discovery Landing
- Former name: The Discovery Place
- Established: 1993
- Location: Tyler, Texas
- Coordinates: 32.3534°N 95.3009°W
- Type: Science museum
- Director: Carol Whiteside
- Website: Discovery Science Place

The Discovery Science Place is a children's science museum located in Tyler, in the U.S. state of Texas. The museum is housed in an old car dealership and has been in service to the community since 1993. The museum offers an extensive array of exhibits including:

- A small mock television news station with working cameras and mini-control board
- Assorted physics-related exhibits, including a kinetic sculpture.
- Fish tank with assorted goldfish
- A large (indoor) man-made cave, with various rock/sediment exhibits built-in and an earthquake simulator.
- Indoor dinosaur fossil dig pit
- A scale representation of various public buildings located in and around Tyler, including the Smith county courthouse, Brookshire's Grocery Company, and Southside Bank.
