= Hubble Live =

- Genre: News / Science / Technology
- Starring: Josh Zepps
- Narrated by: Josh Zepps
- Country of origin: United States
- Original language: English

Production
- Running time: 45 minutes (approx)

Original release
- Network: Science Channel
- Release: May 11, 2009

Related
- The Ends of the Universe: Hubble's Final Chapter

Hubble Live, fully titled Hubble Live: The Final Mission, was a one-hour live American television special presentation that premiered on May 11, 2009 on the Science Channel. The program covered the launch of Space Shuttle Atlantis on NASA's Servicing Mission 4 (HST-SM4), the eleven-day fifth and final mission to repair the Hubble Space Telescope. The program was hosted by Josh Zepps, who is the host of science news series Brink, and featured interviews with NASA astrophysicist and space telescope expert Kim Weaver and former NASA astronaut Paul William Richards.

A one-hour documentary film titled The Ends of the Universe: Hubble's Final Chapter also premiered on the same day and channel.

== See also ==
- STS-125
- Hubble Space Telescope
- Science Channel
