= Time-Place learning =

Animals have Time-place learning ability

Time-place learning (TPL) is the process by which animals link events (e.g. finding food, encountering a predator) with both the location and time of occurrence. It enables them to decide which locations to visit or to avoid based on previous experience and knowledge of the current time of day. TPL presumably allows animals to maximize their chances of finding resources (food, mates) and avoiding predators, increasing survival chances. TPL requires spatial memory and a sense of time. The latter may be based on external time-cues (Zeitgebers), or internally generated circadian rhythms ("biological clock"). TPL may fundamentally underlie episodic memory.

== Insects ==
The first evidence for time-place learning in animals came from studies in the 1930s on honeybees, which could be trained to visit two different feeders, one in the morning and the other in the afternoon. Subsequent work in the 1980s showed that only a few individuals in the colony were able to learn that task, and did so with more precision for the morning than for the afternoon feeding. Honeybees can also be trained to recognize one visual pattern to obtain food in the morning, and another pattern to get food in the afternoon; when presented with both patterns simultaneously, the same bees choose the "morning" pattern in the morning and the "afternoon" pattern in the afternoon.

The Neotropical ant Ectatomma ruidum is also capable of time-place learning. They can learn to visit a feeding site in the morning, another one at midday, and a third one in the afternoon. They follow this spatio-temporal pattern even when food is withheld on test days. They then stay at the feeder for the approximate duration that food was normally available before moving on, at the right time, to the next feeder. This shows that the ants do not rely on direct cues from the food itself, but use instead a learned association between daily time and place.

== Fish ==
In fish, time-place learning has been demonstrated in the golden shiner and the inanga. Golden shiners could be taught to seek food in one half of their aquarium in the morning, in the other half at midday, and back to the first half in the afternoon. They maintained this spatio-temporal pattern even when food was withheld on test days. The spatio-temporal pattern also shifted gradually over several days when the day-night cycle was suddenly shifted early by 6 h, as is typical of circadian rhythms.

Inangas could be taught to seek food in one half of their aquarium in the morning and in the other half in the afternoon, even on test days when food was withheld. However, they could not be taught to avoid one half in the morning and the other half in the afternoon in response to simulated attacks by a heron.

A test of time-place learning with young convict cichlids yielded negative results, for two as well as four time-place associations per day. This was attributed to a low cost of travel between the aquarium corners in which the food was delivered, such that fish could quickly sample all corners sequentially without having to learn which exact corner gave food.

== Birds ==
In birds, time-place learning has been confirmed in garden warblers, starlings, weavers, and pigeons. Garden warblers could learn to visit four rooms inside a large aviary, one during each quarter of a day. It took them only 11 days to learn, with 70% accuracy, to visit the correct room at the correct daily time to get food. The spatio-temporal pattern of visits was then maintained even when food was made available in all rooms at all times. As with circadian rhythms of activity, the spatio-temporal pattern of room visits shifted gradually over several days following a 6-h advance of the day-night cycle, and it ran freely with a non-24 h periodicity for up to 6 days when the birds were placed under constant 24-h dim light and constant food availability. Starlings can show similar patterns, with free-runs up to 11 days in constant dim light.

The insectivorous weaver bird Ploceus bicolor can also learn to associate four feeding rooms with four feeding times, and it maintains the correct spatio-temporal pattern even when one of the rooms is blocked on test days (the bird then waits for the next feeding time and visits the appropriate room for that time); however, room blocking disrupts the spatio-temporal pattern in the granivorous weaver bird Euplectes hordaceus, which suggests that time-place learning may be stronger in species for which food in nature is more likely to vary spatio-temporally (as is the case for insects, as opposed to grain).

Finally, pigeons can learn to peck one key to get food in the morning, and another key in the afternoon, and they maintain this pattern for four days in constant light.

== Mammals ==
Laboratory rats have been taught to enter one arm of a maze in the morning and another in the afternoon, though only 63% of the animals could attain the criterion of nine correct choices over ten consecutive trials. In a protocol not based on food acquisition, rats swimming in a tank could learn the location of one resting platform in the morning, and another in the afternoon. However, other studies have failed to find evidence of time-place learning in rats. Outcomes of time-place tests with rats seem to depend on what behaviors are measured to assess learning, and on the (sometimes too low) costs of not performing well.

Faced with a choice of entering one of three arms at three different times of day, laboratory mice can learn which arm to enter at the correct time, be it to obtain food (a positive reinforcement) or to avoid receiving a mild electric shock (a negative reinforcement).
