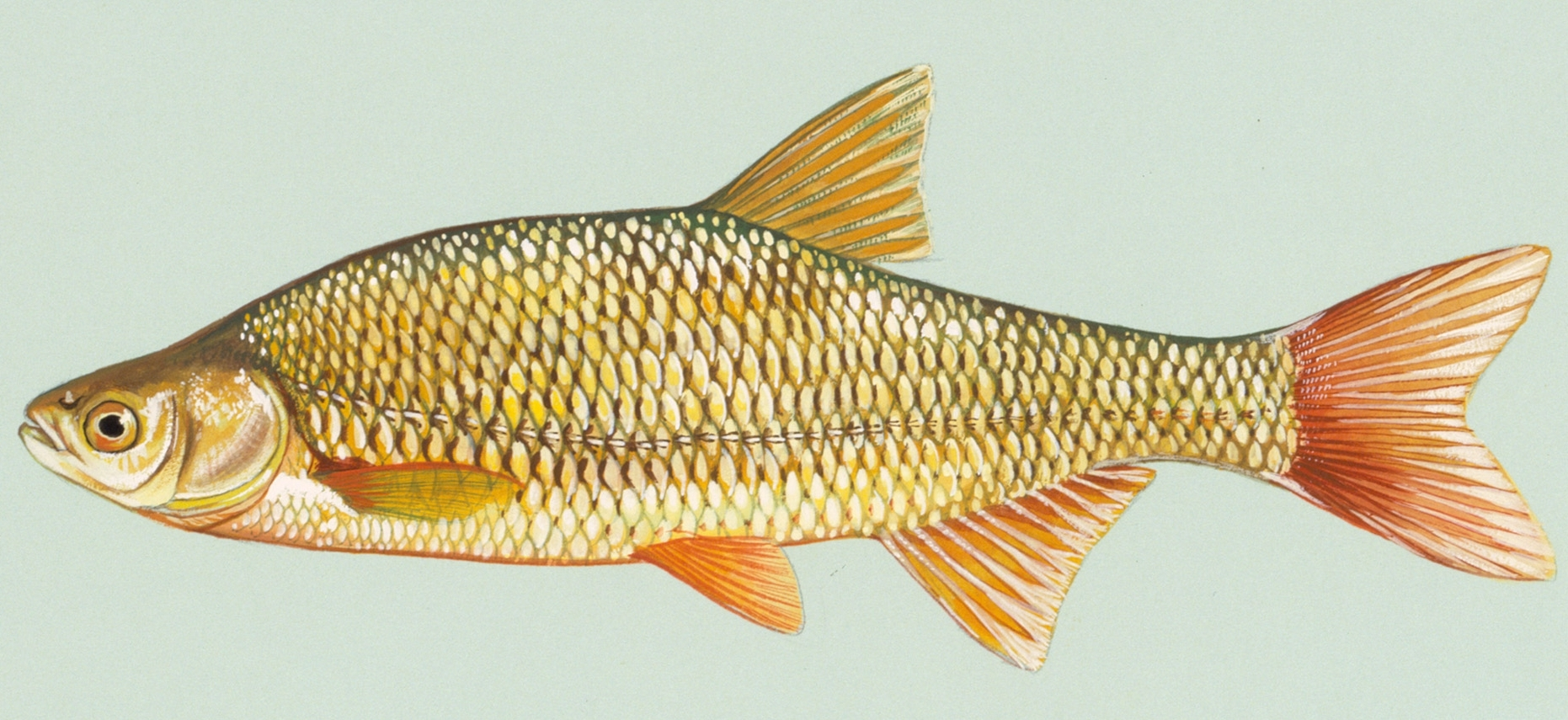

Conservation status
- Least Concern (IUCN 3.1)

Scientific classification
- Kingdom: Animalia
- Phylum: Chordata
- Class: Actinopterygii
- Division: Teleostei
- Order: Cypriniformes
- Family: Leuciscidae
- Subfamily: Leuciscinae
- Genus: Notemigonus; Rafinesque, 1819
- Species: N. crysoleucas

Binomial name
- Notemigonus crysoleucas (Mitchill, 1814)

Synonyms
- Genus: Stilbius Gill, 1865; Leucosomus Heckel, 1843; Stilbe DeKay, 1842; Hemiplus Rafinesque, 1820; Species: Abramis crysoleucas Mitchill, 1814; Cyprinus crysoleucas Mitchill, 1814; Notropis chrysoleucas (Mitchill, 1814); Notemigonus ischanus Jordan, 1877; Plagyrus americanus Cope, 1865; Plargyrus americanus Cope, 1865; Luxilus leptosomus Girard, 1856; Luxilus seco Girard, 1856; Leuciscus boscii Valenciennes, 1844; Notemigonus crysoleucas boscii (Valenciennes, 1844); Leuciscus gardoneus Valenciennes, 1844; Abramis versicolor DeKay, 1842; Leuciscus chrysopterus DeKay, 1842; Hemiplus lacustris Rafinesque, 1820; Notemigonus auratus Rafinesque, 1819; Cyprinus hemiplus Rafinesque, 1817; Notemigonus crysoleucas crysoleucas (Mitchill, 1814)

= Golden shiner =

Golden shiner Temporal range: Late Miocene to present, 5–0 Ma

Species of fish

The golden shiner (Notemigonus crysoleucas) is a species of freshwater ray-finned fish belonging to the family Leuciscidae. This fish occurs in eastern North America. It is the sole member of the genus Notemigonus. Commonly used as a bait fish, it is probably the most widely pond-cultured fish in the United States. It can be found in Quebec and elsewhere in southeastern Canada west to Manitoba or Saskatchewan, and its French name is Méné jaune or Chatte de l'Est.

== Taxonomy ==
It is the only North American member of the subfamily Leuciscinae, within which it occupies a relatively basal position, though still rather derived. All other members of this subfamily are found in Eurasia. Fossil remains of Notemigonus sp. have been recovered from the Late Miocene–aged Montbrook fossil site of Florida, US.

== Description ==
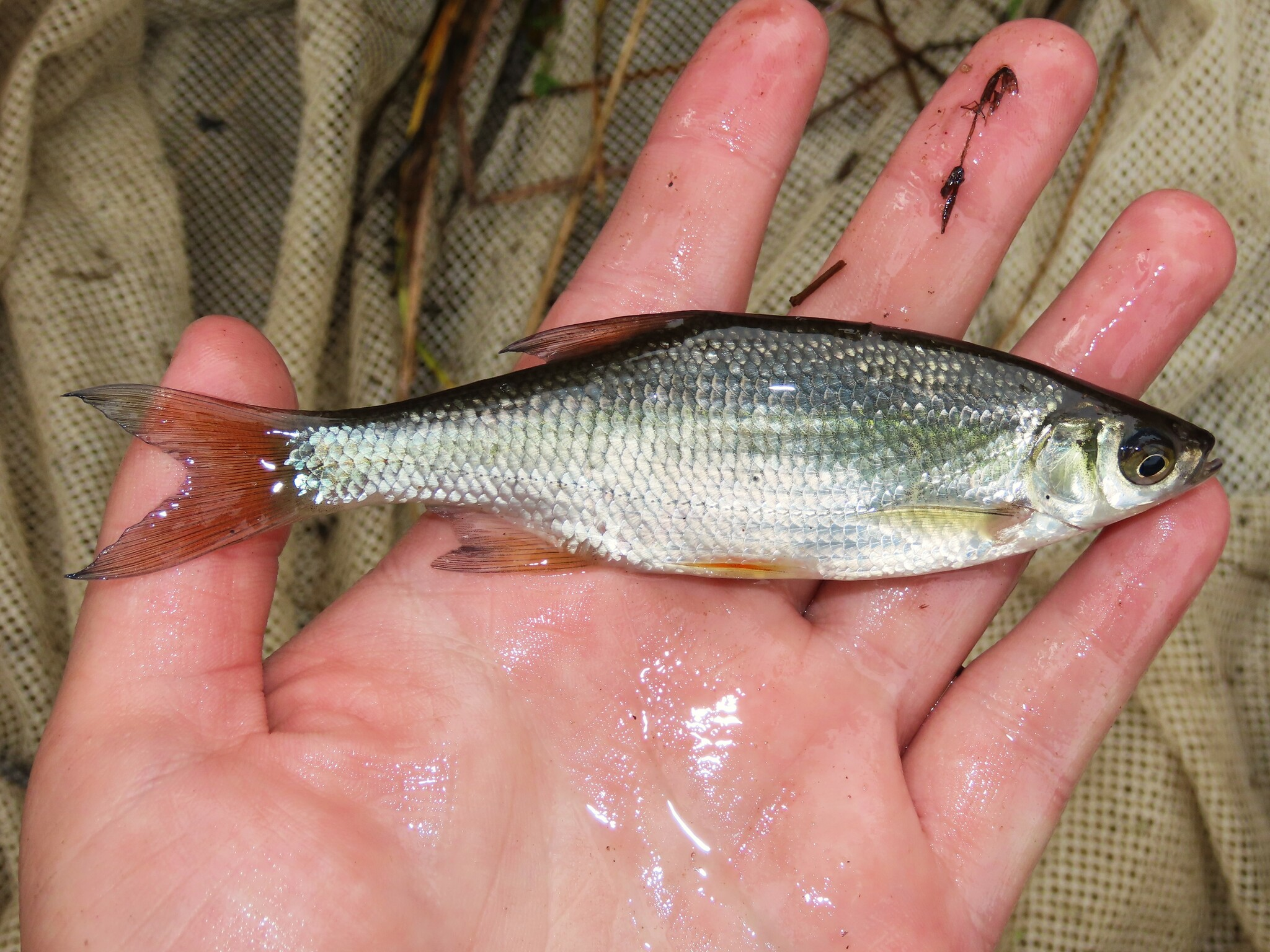
A golden shiner observed in the Mullica River, New Jersey.

Though it has been known to reach a total length (TL) of 36.7 cm (14.4 in), in the wild mature golden shiners are usually between 7 and 20 cm (2.8 and 7.9 in) TL. The body is laterally compressed (deep-bodied). The back is dark green or olive, and the belly is a silvery or brassy white. The sides are silver in smaller individuals, and in clear or turbid water, but golden in larger ones living in stained water. There can be a faint dusky stripe along the sides. The anal fin is large and has 8–19 rays, while the dorsal fin comprises seven to nine rays, typically eight. Scales are relatively large in the adult and easily lost when the fish is handled. The mouth is small and upturned. The eyes are yellow-green, as are the median and pelvic fins, though spawning males can develop orange coloration in these fins, especially in their distal leading rays.

Two characteristics can distinguish the golden shiner from all other North American minnows: (1) the lateral line has a pronounced downward curve, with its lowest point just above the pelvic fins; and (2) there is a fleshy keel lacking scales on the belly between the pelvic fins and the base of the anal fin.

The lack of scales on the keel is important to differentiate the golden shiner from the very similar-looking rudd, Scardinius erythrophtalmus, a European species that has been introduced in a few places in North America. The rudd also has a midventral keel, but that keel bears scales. Golden shiner and rudd can in fact hybridize, and hybrids have a few scales on their midventral keel.

== Distribution ==
The golden shiner is found throughout the eastern half of North America, north to the St Lawrence River, Great Lakes, and Lake Winnipeg, and west to the Dakotas and Texas. It is found as far south as southern Florida and Texas. Because of its use as bait, it has also been introduced in many places outside this native range, especially in western North America.

== Habitat ==
Golden shiners prefer quiet waters and are therefore found in lakes, ponds, sloughs, and ditches. They are sometimes found in the quietest parts of rivers, and like weedy areas. They are fairly tolerant of pollution, turbidity, and low oxygen content. They can also tolerate temperatures as high as 40 °C (104 °F), which is unusually high for a North American minnow.

== Diet ==
Golden shiners are omnivorous and crepuscular planktivores. They eat zooplankton, phytoplankton, microcrustaceans, insects, plants, and algae. They can feed at the surface, in mid-water, or at the bottom. They can locate prey visually, or filter-feed on high-density zooplankton without resorting to visual cues. They are themselves food for all manner of game fish such as trout and bass (black bass and temperate bass,) hence their popularity as bait fish.

== Reproduction ==
In the southern parts of their range, golden shiners can start reproducing at one year of age; in Canada, first breeding is more commonly at three years of age. Females lay up to 200,000 sticky eggs each amid vegetation. There is no parental care. Occasionally, like a few other minnows, golden shiners can deposit their eggs in the occupied nests of pumpkinseed, largemouth bass or bowfin (the latter two can be predators of shiners). This behavior is called egg dumping and resembles the brood parasitism of birds such as cuckoos, inasmuch as the shiner eggs will benefit from the parental care that the nest's owner will provide to the content of their nests. In contrast to parasitism by cuckoos, however, the parent's eggs do not suffer from the presence of parasitic eggs, and may actually benefit from a dilution effect when predators attack the brood.

== Behavior ==
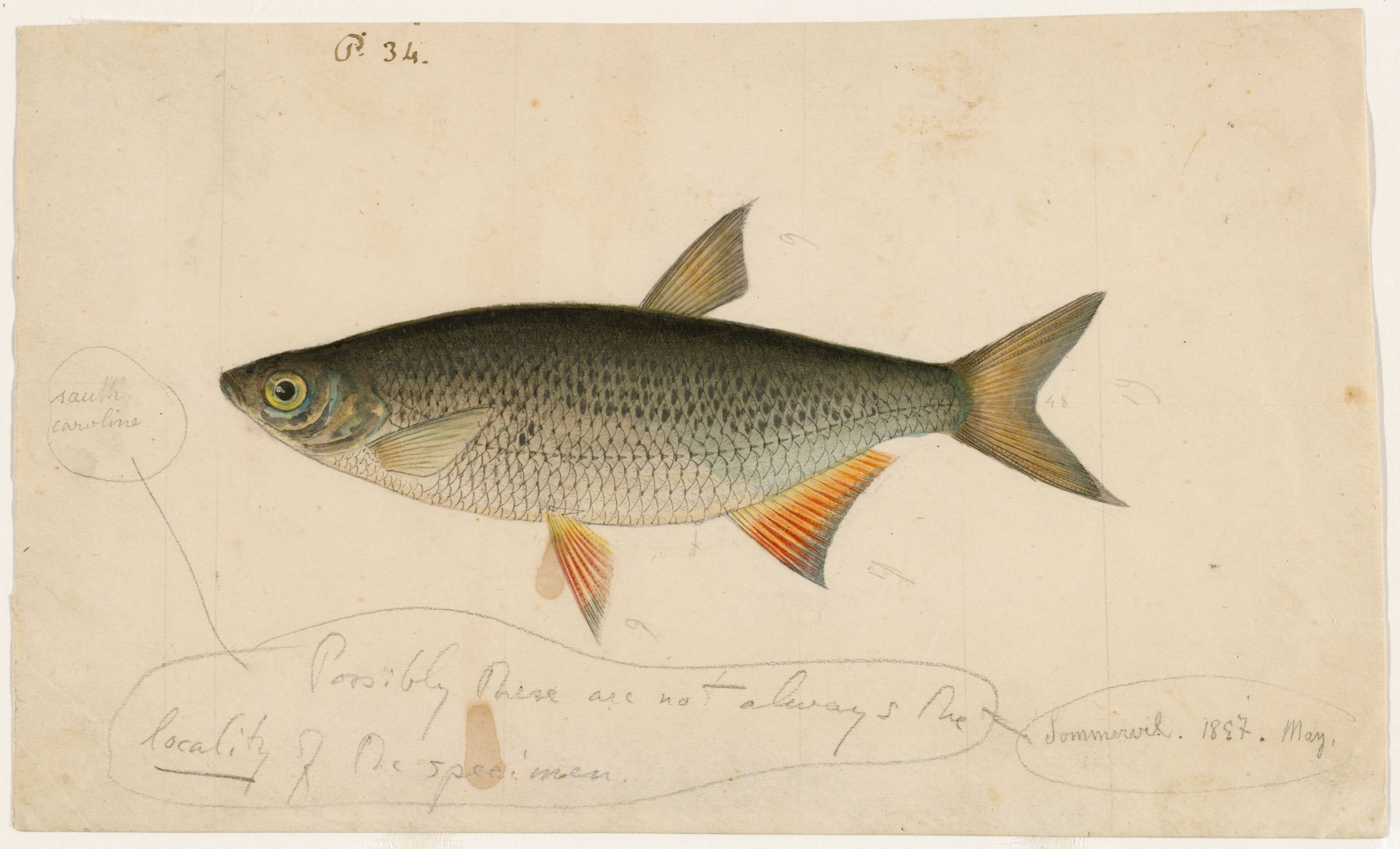
An 1837 watercolor painting of a golden shiner by Jacques Burkhardt

Golden shiners live in large groups (shoals) that roam widely. Several laboratory studies have shown that the movements of a shoal can be determined by a minority of individuals at the front of it. For example, an individual that knows when and where food is available within a large tank can lead many other fish to the right place at the right time of day. If all fish have similar knowledge, there is still a tendency for some individuals to be found always at the front of a moving shoal, possibly because they are intrinsically hungrier and more motivated to find food. Small fish are also found more often at the front of a shoal than larger fish, again possibly because they are more motivated to find food.

Like other minnows, golden shiners are sensitive to the release of an alarm substance, or schreckstoff, contained within special skin cells. If a predator catches and bites into a minnow, the skin is broken, the substance is released, and other minnows in the vicinity can detect the substance and react to it by leaving the area. The substance can also survive intact in the feces of a predator, and minnows can thus detect the presence of a minnow-eating predator through the presence of its feces. In the laboratory, golden shiners were found to react strongly to water that contained feces from snakes that had eaten other golden shiners, but not nearly as much to water laden with feces from snakes that had eaten green swordtails (Xiphophorus hellerii), a fish that does not possess an alarm substance.

Like other fishes, golden shiners have a good daily time sense and can anticipate the arrival of food when this food is made available at the same time of the day or night. They can also do this when there is more than one mealtime a day. This anticipation is expressed as swimming and positioning towards the food source, and other naive individuals can perceive this and join the anticipating fish in the hope of sharing its food.

Golden shiners are also capable of time-place learning (associating different places with different times of day). They can be taught to feed in one part of an aquarium in the morning and a different part in the afternoon; or to feed in one part in the morning, a different part at mid-day, and back to the first part in the afternoon.

== Negative effects of environmental toxicants ==
Researchers have found that long-term exposure of golden shiners to methylmercury can cause disadvantageous effects in the function of the nervous, reproductive, immune, and endocrine systems as well as in behavior. For example, golden shiners exposed to methylmercury showed a decline in reproduction through the inhibition of hypothalamus, pituitary, and gonadal function. Many fish showed higher concentrations of the chemical in the brain compared to the rest of the body. Fish exposed to high amounts of mercury showed signs of delayed shoaling after exposure to predators. These fish took up to nearly three times longer to return to pre-exposure behaviors compared to other groups exposed to lower amounts of mercury.

Studies have also seen relationships between tissue damage and exposure to mercury by examining macrophage aggregates in different fish tissues. Using histological analysis, a positive correlation was seen between the total area of macrophage aggregates and total mercury concentration of muscle tissues in the spleen of both male and female golden shiners.
