= Understanding (TV series) =

American television series

Understanding is a documentary television series that aired from 1994 to 2004 on TLC. The program covered various things understood from a scientific perspective and was narrated by Jane Curtin, Candice Bergen, and Peter Coyote. It originally aired on TLC and as of 2013 is currently being shown on the Science Channel. The series is presented in a similar fashion to two other programs that also show on the Science Channel, Discover Magazine and Megascience.

== Episodes ==
(in alphabetical order; there may be more)

1. Aliens
2. Archaeological Mysteries
3. Ardi: Paula Zahn and a round table of key scientists discuss the discovery of the Ardipithecus Ramidus skeleton
4. Asteroids: Explore the history of our near misses and visiting visions of killer rocks in the sky. Follow the NEAR mission, from its beginning to the history-making end when we land the first man made pacecraft on the huge Near asteroid.
5. Beauty: The collective knowledge of philosophers and mathematicians of the past, as well as modern day artists, scientists, models and musicians form the basis for considering what people find beautiful and why.
6. Bridges
7. Cars
8. Caves: Take a journey into the darkness, deep below the Earth's surface. Discover how caves were formed, learn who has walked their corridors through the ages, and see caves teeming with life that is amazingly different from our sunlit world above.
9. Cities: Experts on subjects ranging from infrastructure to traffic flow explain what it takes to make a city run smoothly. Five cities are studied to see how they work and what gives them their personality.
10. Computing
11. Cyberworld 2020: Look twenty years into the future for a vision of a world where human beings live, work and play with intelligent computers and robots. Explore fears for the future as machines become more powerful, more present and more intrusive.
12. Electricity: Man has harnessed electrical power to light and fuel the world. Learn what electricity is, where it comes from, and how it works.
13. Evolution: Examine the theory and scientific developments since Darwin. Explore the Galapagos Islands and the life forms that inspired Darwin's thinking. Hear the John Scopes controversy in Kansas where fundamentalist Christians want to abolish teaching evolution in schools; origin theories, Azee the orangutan, sexual selection, female boxer Bridgett Riley, and genetic engineering. Features interviews with science historian Richard Milner, author Jonathan Weiner, Celera Genomics president J. Craig Venter, evolutionary biologist Rob Shumaker, Pat Pratt, author Richard Dawkins, Los Alamos Labs scientist Bette Korber, USDA scientist Richard Beeman, evolution teaching opposer Linda Holloway and supporter Sue Gamble, Los Alamos Labs geophysicist and religious fundamentalist John Baumgardner, Swami Dheerananda, evolutionary psychologist Geoffrey Miller, author Michael Shermer (Skeptic), Professor of Biology Randy Thornhill, and Ward F. Odenwald.
14. Extra Terrestrials: We've seen them in sci-fi movies such as Men In Black. But do they really exist in real life without us knowing about it?
15. Fire: For centuries people have used fire to sustain life, to worship God, to annihilate enemies and to create technologies that run the world. Discover how both civilization and science was created from playing with fire.
16. Flight
17. Genes
18. Ice: Scientists span the globe to assess global warming's effect on the world's ice and implications for the entire planet. Cryobiologists study animals that survive freezing temperatures and Olympian Kristi Yamaguchi discusses ice in our everyday world.
19. Laughter: Laughing patterns, how the brain processes a joke, spontaneous laughter infects an African community, the art and craft of humor, faking a smile to reach euphoria. Features interviews by Paul E. McGhee and others.
20. Magnetism
21. Money: Money is the most powerful tool that Man has ever invented. It can build and destroy empires, and make people to go to war. Some people even believe that money is the key to happiness. What makes an object money? Where does it come from and who decides?
22. Murder
23. Mysteries of Memory: The power, fragility and extraordinary qualities of memory are examined through the stories of an amnesia victim, a Vietnam veteran haunted by images of war and people tricked into altering their memories of critical events.
24. Oceans: Explore the universe of the ocean. Take the 1960 journey to the deepest part of the ocean, and meet a man who can hold his breath for four minutes while 500 feet underwater.
25. Odds: The human mind is a complex instrument that often employs the game of odds to guide it in decision-making. Discover how this process works and what beating the odds means in situations from winning the lottery to being struck by lightning.
26. Pyramids
27. Race
28. Risk-Takers / Thrill Seekers: Enter the extreme world of skydivers, big wave riders and wing walkers to discover what pushes these thrill-seekers to the limits of human endurance. Experience the adrenaline rush and learn the vital role this behavior plays in human culture.
29. Skyscrapers: From the Petronas Towers in Malaysia to the John Hancock Center of Chicago, see how the world's tallest structures are designed to handle high winds, earthquakes and fire. Computer graphics illustrate their inner workings and points of vulnerability.
30. Sleep: Most people think they can sleep enough to get by, but few realize it is regulated and required by the brain at any cost. Sleep patterns and habits can be modified and manipulated to better fit our needs, but sleep and wake are in a delicate balance.
31. Space Travel: How do we get people into outer space? An astronaut describes her experiences, scientists explain rocket science, including propulsion, gravity and thrust, and engineers discuss the future of space travel. Astronauts Buzz Aldrin, Winston E. Scott, Story Musgrave, and Shannon Lucid talk about the excitement and wonder of space travel; actor/director Ron Howard explains how the crew simulated weightlessness in the film Apollo 13; science fiction authors Arthur C. Clarke and Charles Sheffield discuss the human longing to understand and explore the universe; and NASA administrator Daniel Goldin talks about the present and future of the U.S. space program.
32. Television: Television has become the dominant form of mass communication providing a source of immediate information and entertainment. Learn how it works and the tricks of the trade used to create programming.
33. The Amazing Brain: The brain's intricate organization is revealed through real-life stories of a teenager with an off-the-charts IQ and a child with half his brain removed to control seizures. Innovative medical tools, including 3-D imaging, track the brain in action.
34. The Paranormal
35. The Power of Genes: The 21st century has been heralded as "the biotech century," but what does this mean? From Dolly the cloned sheep to DNA forensic work, genetic engineering has dramatic implications for society.
36. The Senses: The world, as we know it, is shaped by our senses. The biological processes that allow us to see, hear, smell, taste and touch are incredibly complex. Scientists examine our senses and medical breakthroughs relating to them. Features the artificial intelligence project, Cog, neuroscientist Vilayanur S. Ramachandran, photographer Howard Schatz, Stomp (dance troupe), and a perfume company.
37. The Universe
38. Time
39. Traffic: Examine one of society's greatest frustrations, the gridlock that exists on the world's roadways. Since the invention of the automobile, car travel has become increasingly hazardous. Visit the world's most crowded cities in search of solutions. Narrator: Barry Corbin
40. Tunnels: From subways to storage, tunnels occupy much of the infrastructure beneath our feet. Descend 1,700 feet below the mountains of northern Nevada to the most lucrative gold mine in North America and examine the world's largest railway tunnel system.
41. Uncertainty: Explore the strange, small world of quantum mechanics. The phenomenon of "uncertainty" takes a quizzical glimpse at quarks and a world in constant flux.
42. Viruses: Viruses are the tiniest, simplest form of life on the planet. Yet they know ways to enter our body, kidnap our cells, and outwit our defenses.
43. Volcanoes
44. Weather: Chase tornadoes with the Oklahoma-based VORTEX Project and visit the NOAA's Space Environment Center to examine the solar cycles and meteorological currents that spawn the Gulf Stream, El Niño and the crucial North Atlantic Oscillation.
45. Widgets
