= American Association of Acupuncture and Oriental Medicine =

The American Association of Acupuncture and Oriental Medicine (AAAOM), founded in 1981 and incorporated in 1983 as a 501(c)(6) organization, is the largest association of acupuncturists and acupuncture students in the United States.

== Scope and operations ==
The AAAOM's stated mission is to represent Acupuncture and Oriental Medicine (AOM) practitioners and students and provide leadership on AOM issues in order to advance the profession of AOM in the United States and enhance public health and well-being.

== History ==
AAAOM was formed in 1981 and incorporated in Washington DC in 1983. In 1993 AAAOM splits into two organizations, the American Association of Oriental Medicine (AAOM) and the Acupuncture and Oriental Medicine Alliance (AOMA). The Chinese Advisory Council (CAC) was formed in 2001 and was assigned one seat on the board of directors of the AAOM. The Korean Advisory Council (KAC) was formed in 2004 and was assigned one seat on the board of directors of the AAOM. The AOMA and AAOM merge to form the AAAOM in 2007. In 2010 the KAC dissolved.
