= An Idiot Abroad =

2010 British television travel documentary series

- Also known as: An Idiot Abroad 2: The Bucket List; An Idiot Abroad 3: The Short Way Round
- Genre: Travel documentary Comedy; Adventure
- Directed by: Richard Yee; Krishnendu Majumdar; Jamie Jay Johnson; Benjamin Green; Luke Campbell
- Starring: Karl Pilkington; Ricky Gervais; Stephen Merchant; Warwick Davis
- Theme music composer: Vik Sharma
- Opening theme: "Seven Wonders"
- Ending theme: "The Wrestler"
- Country of origin: United Kingdom
- Original language: English
- No. of series: 3
- No. of episodes: 20 (list of episodes)

Production
- Executive producers: Ricky Gervais; Stephen Merchant; Richard Yee; Krishnendu Majumdar; Dan Goldsack
- Producers: Richard Yee; Krishnendu Majumdar; Luke Campbell
- Running time: 60 minutes (inc. adverts)
- Production companies: Mentorn Media (series 1); RiSK (series 2–3); Me & You Productions (series 3)

Original release
- Network: Sky One
- Release: 23 September 2010 – 14 December 2012

An Idiot Abroad is a British travel documentary comedy television series broadcast on Sky One, as well as a series of companion books published by Canongate Books, created by Ricky Gervais and Stephen Merchant and starring Karl Pilkington. The ongoing theme of both the television series and the books is that Pilkington has no interest in global travel, so Merchant and Gervais make him travel while they stay in the United Kingdom and monitor his progress.

== Episodes ==
Series	Episodes	Originally released	
Series	Episodes	First released	Last released
1	8	23 September 2010	11 November 2010
2	8	23 September 2011	11 November 2011
3	4	30 November 2012	21 December 2012

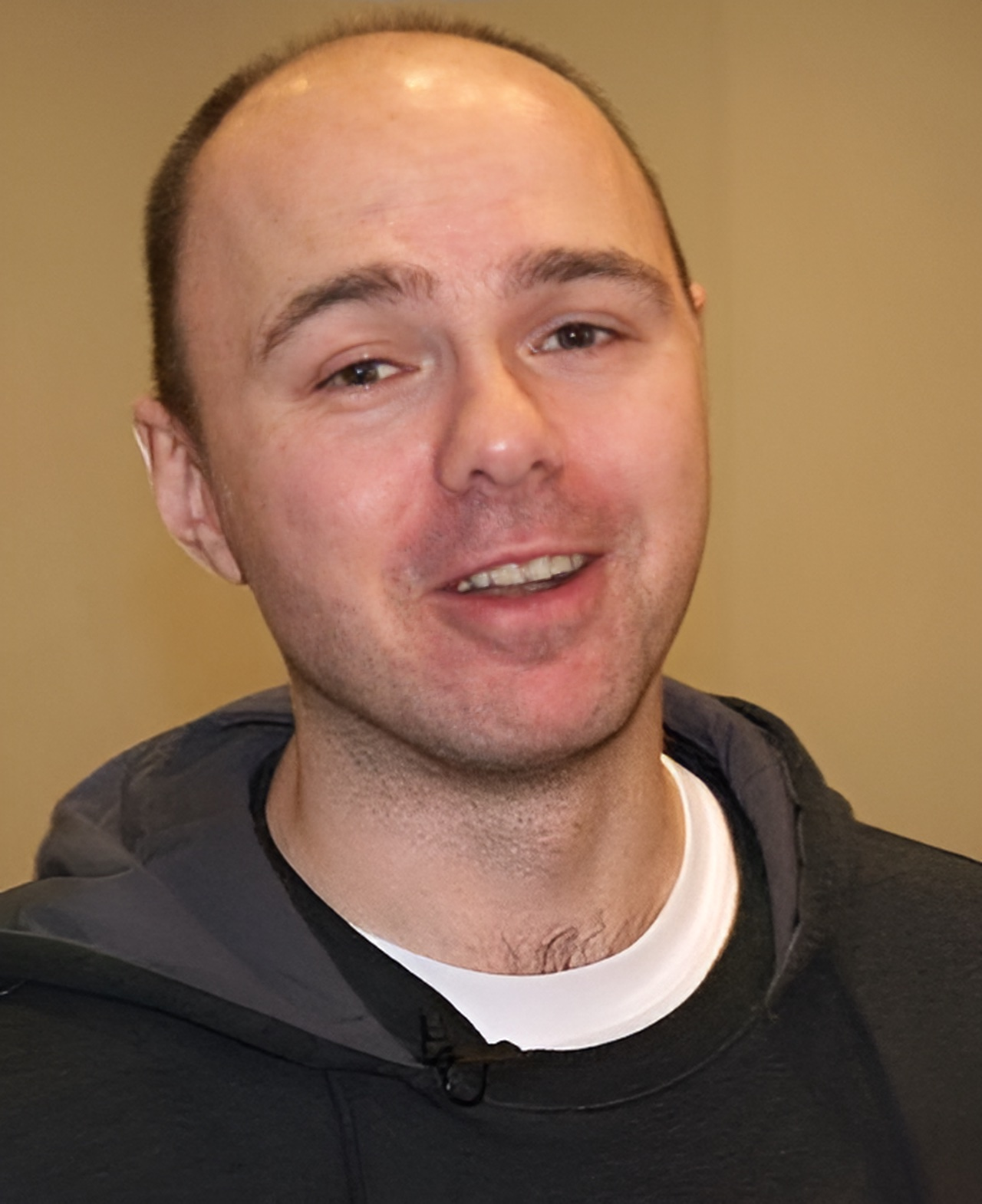
The series features Karl Pilkington as he travels around the world

Originally developed under the working title Karl Pilkington's Seven Wonders of the World, An Idiot Abroad documents Karl Pilkington's journeys to foreign countries under the guise of visiting the New Seven Wonders of the World. Though the New Seven Wonders of the World include the Colosseum in Rome, this is not one of Pilkington's destinations, Gervais and Merchant feeling Karl would be too comfortable in Italy; instead he visits the Great Pyramids in Egypt (which is the last of the Seven Wonders of the Ancient World to remain intact). Most of each episode focuses on Pilkington's reactions to cultural differences and idiosyncrasies in the countries he visits. Gervais and Merchant call Pilkington during each trip, to assign him tasks often not related to why he believed he was visiting the country. These include training as a luchador, travelling the desert on a camel, and dancing with a samba school in a Carnival parade. It was confirmed by the show's producers, Mentorn Media, that Pilkington has no prior warning about these situations. The camera man coaxes him along. Gervais commented: "This is a [more real] documentary than most others you'll ever see on television. We don't plan it, he doesn't know what's going to happen."

A book entitled The Travel Diaries of Karl Pilkington was published shortly after the series. It was authored by Pilkington and gives a deeper insight into his feelings on what he was experiencing.

The second series shows Pilkington performing activities from a general (but not his) "bucket list".

Gervais produced a Christmas special mini-series that aired in the UK in late 2012. The original concept, pitched by Gervais, was to show Pilkington and Warwick Davis travelling around England on a bike together. The outcome featured the pair travelling to China from Venice via Eastern Europe and India, loosely based on the journey of Marco Polo. Gervais said, "We started planning the route for An Idiot Abroad 3: The Short Way Round, this week. It's only a three-part special but we've decided to make it a bit more global as opposed to 'around Kent for a few days', Pilkington is starting to regret it already." An Idiot Abroad 3 did not feature Stephen Merchant, who was busy with other projects. After the conclusion of the show, Ricky Gervais and Karl Pilkington worked together again in the TV series Derek.

There is also an official podcast to accompany the programme and book. The programme was originally broadcast in the United Kingdom on Sky1, and has since started airing in other countries.

== Reception ==
=== Series 1 ===
The very first episode of An Idiot Abroad aired on 23 September 2010 at 9:30pm on Sky1 and achieved an official audience figure of 1,241,000 viewers based on BARB. These audience figures were Sky1's best viewer numbers for a debuting show since Terry Pratchett's Going Postal four months earlier, making An Idiot Abroad the fourth-most popular non-terrestrial programme that day. The program increased its viewing figures throughout its run, with Episode three attracting 1,850,000 viewers and Episode seven attracting 1,918,000 viewers.

=== Series 2 ===
The show returned on 23 September 2011 at 9:00pm on Sky1 with 2,659,000 viewers, making it the most watched Sky1 and non-terrestrial programme since 2005.

=== Series 3 ===
A three-part Christmas special was shown from 30 November 2012 to 14 December 2012 on Sky1. Pilkington is joined by actor Warwick Davis travelling to various locations along the route taken by Marco Polo to China. On 21 December 2012, a fourth episode entitled "A Commentary" was broadcast; it featured Davis, Pilkington, and Gervais commenting on episode three. Gervais confirmed that the specials would be the end of the series.

=== An Idiot Abroad: Lost Luggage ===
In February 2013, Science, which broadcast all three series in North America, began rebroadcasting episodes of An Idiot Abroad under the title An Idiot Abroad: Lost Luggage, marketed as "Karl Pilkington's greatest journeys... now with never-before-seen footage" and "Same idiot, more scenes." Each Lost Luggage episode is made up of the original episode and two brief, new "Lost Luggage" segments filmed at Gervais's home in England that were not part of the original episode. In each "Lost Luggage" segment, Gervais and Pilkington hold a short discussion.

== DVD & Blu-ray release ==
The first series was released in the UK on 15 November 2010 for DVD and Blu-ray. The second series was released on 21 November 2011, as well as a box set featuring series 1 and 2. The third series was released on DVD in the UK on 24 December 2012, as well as a box set featuring series 1, 2 and 3.

The first series was released on Blu-ray in the US on 16 November 2010, and a Blu-ray box set of the first and second series on 29 November 2011. The first series was released on DVD on 10 January 2012, and series two was released on DVD on 8 January 2013.

== List of countries, locations and events ==
This is a list of countries, locations and events that Pilkington experiences over all three series of An Idiot Abroad. China, India and the United States are the only countries that he visits more than once, and China is the only country that appears in all three series.

Series 1 – The Seven Wonders:

- China – Great Wall of China (Episode 1)
- India – Taj Mahal (Episode 2)
- Israel – Jerusalem, Dead Sea (Episode 3)
- West Bank – Bethlehem (Episode 3)
- Jordan – Petra (Episode 3)
- Mexico – Chichen Itza (Episode 4)
- Egypt – Great Pyramid of Giza (Episode 5)
- Brazil – Christ the Redeemer (Episode 6)
- Peru – Machu Picchu (Episode 7)

Series 2 – The Bucket List:

- New Zealand – Bungee jumping (Episode 1)
- Vanuatu – Visit a desert island (Episode 1)
- Russia – Trans-Siberian Railway (Episode 2)
- Mongolia – Mongolian wrestling (Episode 2)
- China – Kingdom of the Little People (Episode 2)
- Thailand – Songkran (Episode 3)
- Australia – Swimming with sharks (Episode 3)
- United States – Whale watching in Alaska (Episode 4)
- South Africa – Safari (Episode 5)
- Uganda – Bwindi Impenetrable Forest (Episode 5)
- United States – U.S. Route 66 (Episode 6)
- Japan – Climbing Mount Fuji (Episode 7)

Series 3 – The Short Way Round:

- Italy – Venice (Episode 1)
- Macedonia (Episode 1)
- India (Episodes 2 & 3)
- China (Episode 3)
- Hong Kong (Episode 3)
- Macau (Episode 3)

== Books ==
An Idiot Abroad: The Travel Diaries of Karl Pilkington is the fourth book written by Karl Pilkington. This book is an accompaniment to the television series An Idiot Abroad. It was released through Canongate Books. A second book entitled The Further Adventures of An Idiot Abroad was released on 20 September 2012 by Canongate Books. The second book features a conclusion where An Idiot Abroad 3 is featured, but it is unclear if a third book will be released.

== Critical reception ==
The show has received widespread acclaim. Tim Goodman of The Hollywood Reporter praised the show, saying: "At times, it's nearly impossible not to fall apart laughing. An Idiot Abroad is ridiculously funny and even when it's clear that Gervais and Merchant—pulling the strings back home in England and communicating with Pilkington via cell phone (some of these exchanges are scripted and sound added post-production, since cell coverage is not available in remote areas)—are having a cruel laugh, it's nearly impossible not to fall apart laughing at poor Pilkington's fate." TV Shows on DVD gave the first series a positive review, saying: "I've been to places featured in three of the episodes, and it was a blast watching Karl experience them."

James Draven from MSN gave the second series a positive review: "An Idiot Abroad 2 may dress up its premise as 'bucket list,' but it's really a fish-out-of-water presentation of Karl Pilkington's idiot-savant credentials. The laughter he inevitably provokes, regardless of the situation, make this a must-see. If you miss it, you'll miss out," and gave the first episode four stars.

Reviewing the show's third series, Shiny Potato said: "Warwick Davis is a welcome addition to the series, as he only seems to make Karl's reactions worse." Ricky Gervais believes the third series to be the show's best.

== Spin-off ==
In autumn 2013, a spin-off series called The Moaning of Life aired on Sky 1. It once again featured Pilkington travelling around the world and was produced in a similar style. Its premise is different, however, as Pilkington set out to discover how other cultures deal with "life's biggest issues". Gervais and Merchant were not involved in the project and they did not appear in the series or its credits.
