= MythBusters Jr. =

Australian-American science entertainment television program

- Genre: Factual television; Science
- Created by: Adam Savage; Wyatt Channell; John Luscombe; John Tessier
- Based on: MythBusters
- Presented by: Adam Savage; Valerie Castillo; Elijah Horland; Cannan Huey-You; Jesse Lawless; Rachel Pizzolato; Allie Weber
- Narrated by: Robert Lee
- Opening theme: "Mythbusters Juniors Theme" by Neil Sutherland
- Composer: Neil Sutherland
- Countries of origin: United States; Australia
- Original language: English
- No. of seasons: 1
- No. of episodes: 10

Production
- Camera setup: Multiple
- Running time: 43–44 minutes

Original release
- Network: Science Channel
- Release: January 2 – February 6, 2019

MythBusters Jr. is a science entertainment television program created for the Science Channel and produced by Australia's Beyond Television Productions. The series is a spin-off of the TV show MythBusters and follows its premise of testing the validity of myths using the scientific method. It premiered on the Science network on January 2, 2019, and consisted of 10 episodes.

The show is hosted by veteran MythBuster Adam Savage and has a cast of six children skilled in STEM topics.

== Cast ==
=== Main host ===
- Adam Savage

=== Junior MythBusters ===
- Valerie Castillo – 15-year-old skilled builder and robotics expert with experience in CAD drawing and 3D printing.
- Elijah Horland – 12-year-old self-taught maker and programmer who started building computers at 9.
- Cannan Huey-You – 12-year-old with a background in coding and motion physics who dreams of being an astronaut. Brother of Carson Huey-You.
- Jesse Lawless – 15-year-old car enthusiast who built a mini chopper by himself at age 12.
- Rachel Pizzolato – 14-year-old who has remodeled houses since she was young.
- Allie Weber – 13-year-old patent inventor recognized by 3M as one of the top 10 young scientists in the country.

=== Builders ===
- Tamara Robertson – contestant and finalist of MythBusters: The Search.
- Jon Marcu

=== Helpers ===
- Carson Huey-You – assisted in the Can you barricade a door with furniture? episode.

== Episodes ==
No.	Title	Original release date	U.S. viewers (millions)
1	"Duct Tape Special"	January 2, 2019	0.323
Can you make a functioning parachute out of duct tape? (busted) Will a tyre totally made out of duct tape function adequately? (confirmed)
2	"Dynamite Air Freshener"	January 9, 2019	0.191
Can an accidental spark ignite a car filled with air freshener? (plausible) Can a dog shake off 70% of its water weight after getting wet? (plausible)
3	"Battery Blast"	January 16, 2019	0.260
Can a Lithium battery catch fire if crushed in a garbage truck? (confirmed) Does an arrow truly fly "As straight as an arrow"? (plausible)
4	"Demolition Dominoes"	January 23, 2019	0.242
Can a small domino knock over successively larger dominoes to the point of crushing a car? (plausible) Is it impossible to remove a single remaining brick at the base of a Jenga tower without collapsing it? (confirmed)
5	"Gravity Busters"	January 23, 2019	0.256
In slow motion the bottom of a hanging slinky doesn't move when the top is released. Does it defy gravity? (confirmed) Can a number 2 pencil draw a line for 35 miles, or write 45,000 words? (35 miles busted, 45,000 words confirmed)
6	"Shredder Explosion" "Paper Shred Ka-Boom!"	January 30, 2019	N/A
Can cleaning a paper shredder with canned air cause an explosion? (confirmed) If you made mayonnaise during an electrical storm, will it stop the ingredients combining? (busted)
7	"Flatus Special" "Countdown to Gas-tastrophe"	January 30, 2019	N/A
Can a medical laser ignite a patient's fart during an operation? (plausible) Can Adam's fart power a rocket? (confirmed)
8	"Bug Special"	February 6, 2019	0.166
Can a sticky bug trap catch a human? (confirmed) Is spider silk stronger than an equivalent mass of steel wire? (confirmed) A line of what household substance will stop an ant crossing it? (chalk, baby powder, powdered spice, cinnamon and cayenne pepper powder busted, olive oil confirmed)
9	"Deep Space Hollywood"	February 6, 2019	0.161
Can you actually fly from one spacecraft to another using a fire extinguisher, like in the movie Gravity? (busted) The tagline from Alien says "In space no one can hear you scream", but is it true? (busted)
10	"Breaking Bad Blow-Up"	February 6, 2019	0.190
Can a scrap yard magnet erase a laptop drive from the outside of the police evidence room and pull everything metal from across the floor into the wall in front? (busted) Can you barricade a door with furniture to stop a bad guy? (plausible) Note: Breaking Bad creator Vince Gilligan makes a guest appearance.
