= Castle of Fontalva =

Medieval castle in Portugal

Coordinates: 38°59′12.7″N 7°17′51.9″W

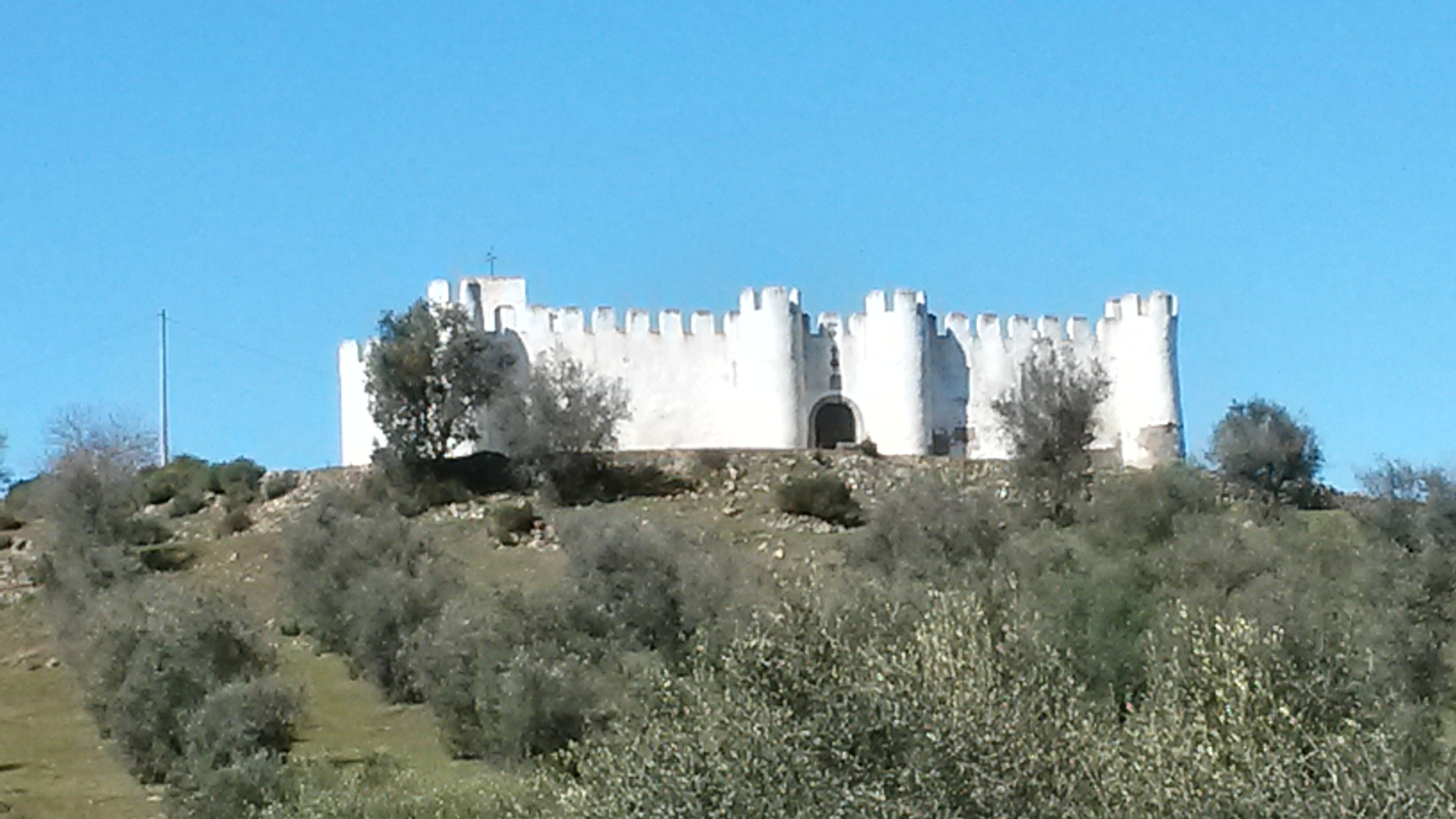
Castle of Fontalva

The Castle of Fontalva (Portuguese: Castelo de Fontalva) is a medieval castle located in the Elvas municipality, Portalegre District of Portugal.

== History ==
=== Background ===
Although there is little information available about this fortification, it is believed that was built on the remains of an ancient fortress. The Romans have occupied the area, as well as the Muslims.

=== Late medieval castle ===
The current structure remains date back to the end of the 15th century or even the beginning of the 16th century, under the reign of King John III (1521–1557)

=== Nineteenth century to present day ===
In private hands, at some point of 19th century or the first half of the 20th century, the people had demolished several buildings that only the walls, outside the north side, east and north-east; and internally, by the South still stand.

It is classified by the IGESPAR arm of the Portuguese government as Property of Public Interest by decree published on September 29, 1977.

In the second half of the twentieth century, aiming to adapt the rural property for purposes tourist, a dining room was built on the top floor of the west side. Recently, this work has continued in absentia of the government, with the pavement rehabilitation, recovery of masonry and plaster, whitewash, roofing installation, doors and windows, running water, electricity and central heating.

== Architecture ==
Erected in a dominant position on top of a hill, at an altitude of 337 meters above the sea level of plant irregular pentagonal, flanked by five cubelos in vertices, two flanking the gateway in arc semicircular, ripping the wall East. This door is surmounted by stone Silva family arms surmounted by a cruciform loophole and this, in turn, by a cross in a niche. The 'Gate of Betrayal' 'ripping the Southwest. Both the wall, covered by an adarve, as the turrets are castellated.
