= Melody Kay =

American actress

- Born: Melody Dolor Kay; August 28, 1979 (age 46); Taylor, Michigan, U.S.
- Occupation: Actress
- Years active: 1990–2004, 2025-present

Melody Dolor Kay (born August 28, 1979) is an American actress. She starred in the movies Camp Nowhere and The NeverEnding Story III: Escape from Fantasia.

== Biography ==
Melody was born in Michigan to Sally Kopczynski and Frank Kopczynski; the family ran the Melody Lane Motel in Riverview, Michigan, and named their daughter after the motel.

Melody did local theater, starred in Life commercials and acted on and off Broadway. After a twenty-year hiatus from film, she returned with the horror film Round the Decay.

Melody is married to Wesley Berry and has 4 children. She also has one half sister.

== Filmography ==
=== Film ===
Year	Title	Role	Notes
1991	Carolina Skeletons	Sue Ellen	TV movie
1994	Camp Nowhere	Gaby Nowicki	
1994	Family Album	Anne at age 13	TV movie (uncredited)
1994	The NeverEnding Story III: Escape from Fantasia	Nicole	
2025	Round the Decay	Theresa Newport	

=== Television ===
Year	Title	Role	Notes
1993	It Had to Be You	Marylou	Episode: "Pilot"
1995	The Client	Alison	Episode: "The Peach Orchard"; Episode: "Happily Ever After"
2003	The District	Ruth Ann	Episode: "Last Waltz"
2004	Yes, Dear	Bridesmaid	Episode: "Shirley Cooks with Love"
