= Eliot Wald =

American comedian

Eliot Wald (February 10, 1946 – July 12, 2003) was a comedy writer who worked for The Second City improv group in Chicago and for Saturday Night Live before turning to movies.

He and a partner, Andrew Kurtzman, wrote scripts for the television movie Hot Paint (1988) and for the films See No Evil, Hear No Evil (1989), Camp Nowhere (1994) and Down Periscope (1996).

Wald grew up in the Bronx, graduated from Bronx High School of Science (1962) and Hofstra University (B.A., 1967) and then moved to Chicago, where he wrote for underground papers and for WTTW, the public television station in that city. At the station in 1975, he came up with the idea for a movie critics' show, the program that eventually became Siskel & Ebert and later At the Movies with Ebert & Roeper.

Wald joined the staff of the Chicago Daily News to write for a youth-oriented section called Sidetracks. When the Daily News closed in 1978, he joined the Chicago Sun-Times, where he wrote about music, television and other topics before joining the writing staff of Second City. One of many Second City alums to join Saturday Night Live, Wald contributed to the show in an era known for performances by Eddie Murphy and Billy Crystal, often collaborating with another Chicago writer, Nate Herman.

He lived and wrote in New York for five years before he and Kurtzman moved to Los Angeles. He was married to Jane Shay Wald, an intellectual property lawyer. Eliot Wald died in Los Angeles of cancer at age 57 in 2003.
