= Carson Huey-You =

American physicist and child prodigy

- Born: August 2002 (age 24)
- Parent(s): Claretta Kimp; Andre Huey-You

Academic background
- Education: Texas Christian University
- Academic advisor: Dr. Magnus L. Rittby

Academic work
- Discipline: Quantum physics

Carson Huey-You (born August 2002) is a child prodigy who is the youngest person to graduate from college in the state of Texas and among the youngest in the world. He graduated from Texas Christian University on May 13, 2017 with a bachelor's degree in physics and with a minor in Mandarin Chinese and mathematics at the age of 14. Huey-You graduated with his master's degree at age 17 in late 2019, and graduated with his doctorate at the age 21 on May 13, 2024.

== Early life ==
Huey-You was born in the summer of 2002 to Claretta Kimp and Andre Huey-You, a former pilot. His mother and father divorced when he was very young.

Huey-You showed exceptional intelligence at a very young age. He was reading chapter books at age two and wanting to learn calculus by age three. His mother, Claretta Kimp, said, "I got him a little calculus book and he could work some of the very first questions in the book and then I thought, ok, you're really smart".

His mother, who studied early education and business at Southern Illinois University, homeschooled him until he was five years old. He and his younger brother, Cannan, attended and graduated from the Accommodated Learning Academy in Grapevine, Texas.

== Education ==
He scored a 1770 on the SAT national college entrance test and graduated from high school as co-valedictorian with a 4.0 GPA at age 10.

During his time as an undergraduate student, Carson Huey-You commuted between home and campus with his mother. In late 2019 at age 17, Carson Huey-You graduated with a master's degree in physics.

== Media ==
Carson and Cannan Huey-You were featured in Parade meeting with Bill Nye and discussing the physics related to the solar eclipse of August 21, 2017. Cannan starred in MythBusters Jr. in 2019, while Carson appeared as an advisor in two episodes.

== Personal life ==
Outside academics, Huey-You enjoys playing the piano, Minecraft, chess, and swimming. Huey-You and his brother both enjoy the Marvel movies and The Lord of the Rings. They also have a dog named Klaus, named after the Nobel Prize winning German physicist Klaus von Klitzing. Huey-You cited The Westing Game as one of his favorite pieces of literature and pot pie as one of his favorite foods.

As of fall of 2018, his 12-year-old brother, Cannan Huey-You, is a sophomore at Texas Christian University pursuing a degree in astrophysics and engineering; he hopes to be an astronaut.
