= Allen Pan =

American YouTuber and engineer (born 1989)

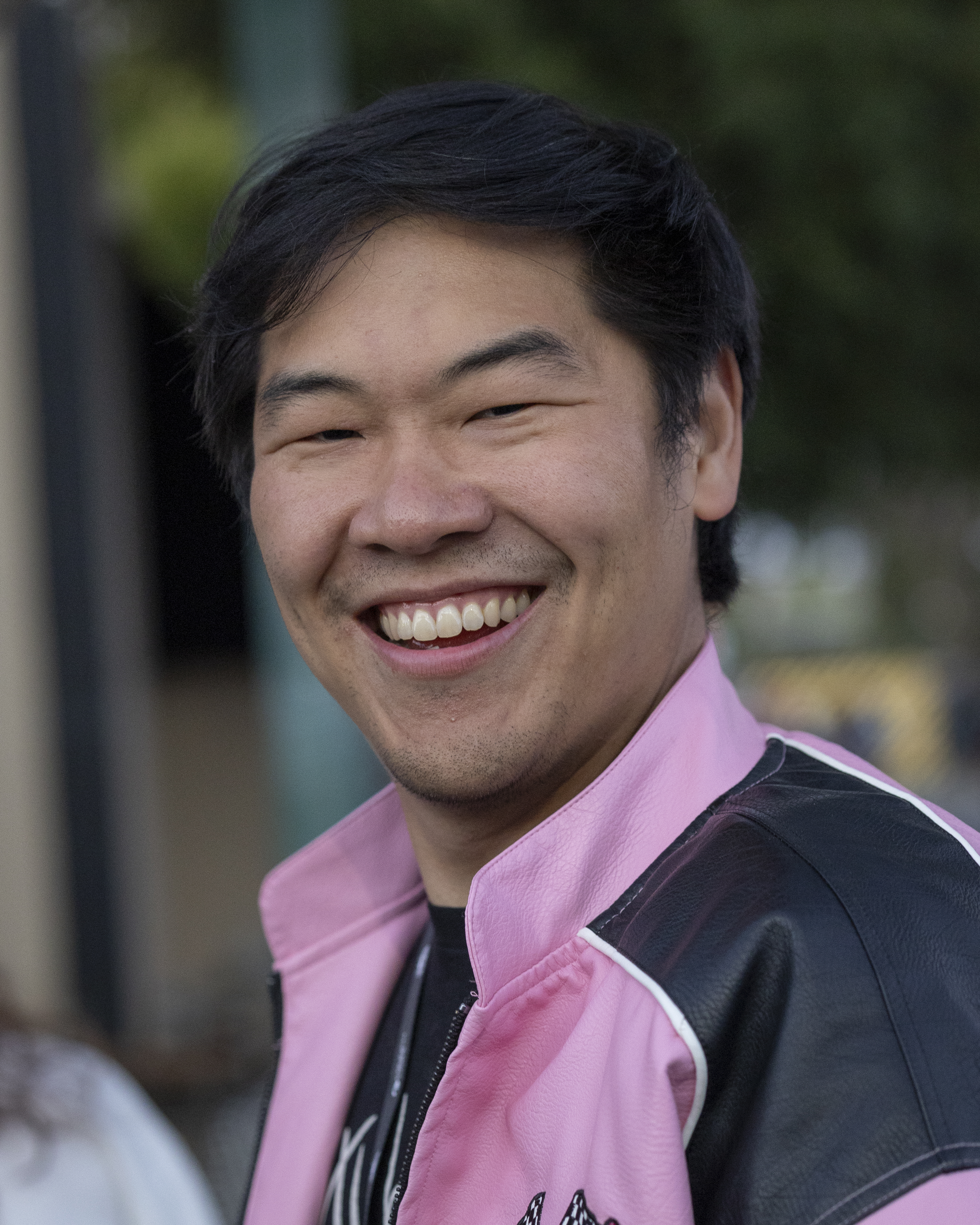
- Pan in 2026
- Born: Allen Pan; December 22, 1989 (age 36)
- Education: University of Southern California (Bachelor of Science)

YouTube information
- Channel: Allen Pan
- Years active: 2015–present
- Genre: Maker
- Subscribers: 2.26 million
- Views: 329.72 million
- Last updated: December 6, 2025

Allen Pan (born December 22, 1989) is an American YouTuber and electrical engineer. He is known for his Maker culture-oriented videos, creating gadgets and machines.

== Early life ==
Allen Pan was born on December 22, 1989. He went to the University of Southern California, graduating in 2012 with a BS in electrical engineering.

== Career ==
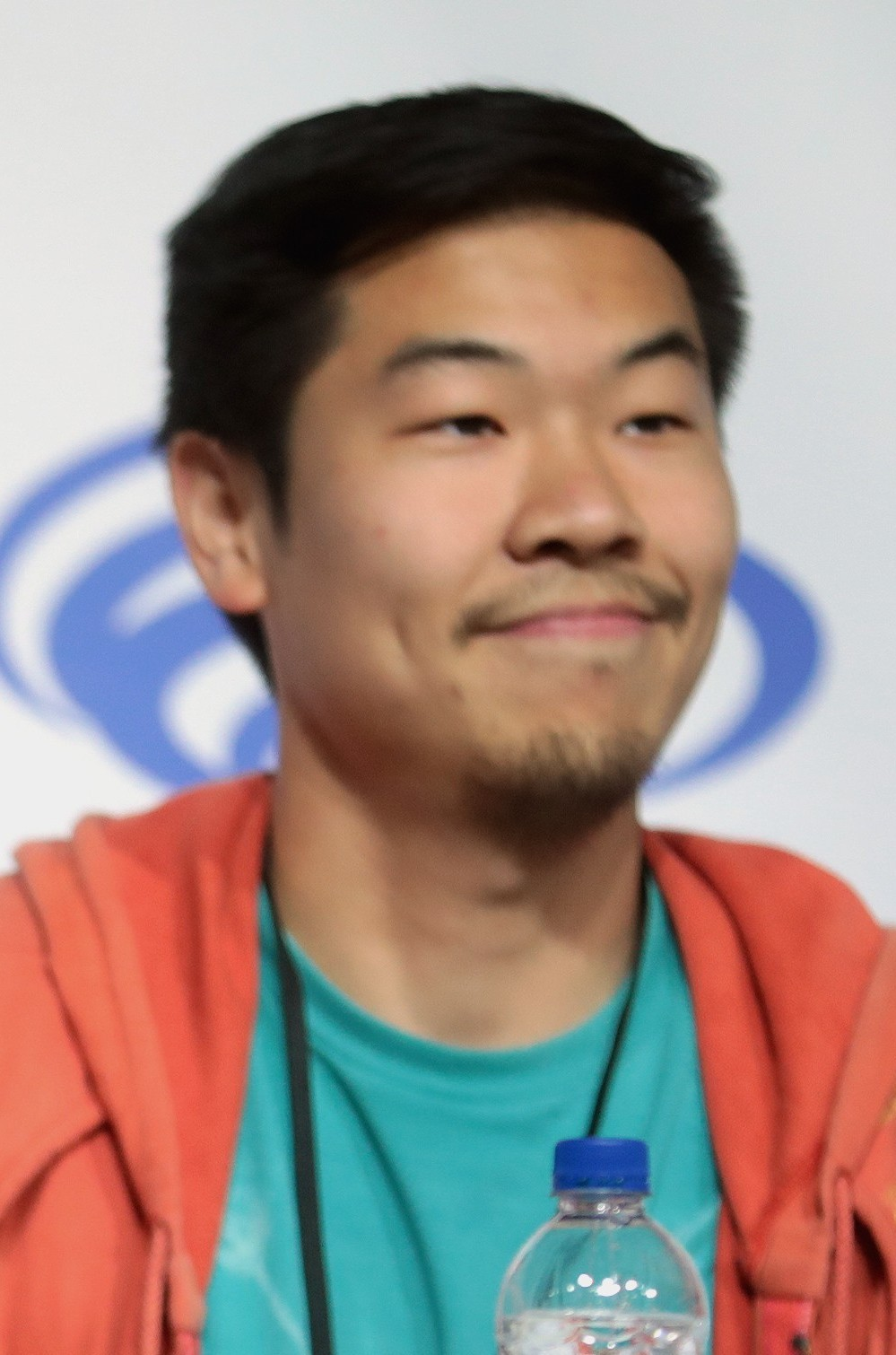
Pan in 2019

Pan created his YouTube channel on March 27, 2015. It was originally called Sufficiently Advanced, inspired by a quote from Arthur C. Clarke. Pan was inspired by 90's and early 00's animated superhero TV shows. His first video was of a wrist gadget he made that replicated an attack from Naruto. He initially only posted the video on Facebook, but, after it received gained views, he also uploaded it to YouTube. Pan originally received media attention in late 2015 after uploading a viral video of him creating a real-life version of the superhero Thor's hammer Mjolnir, which only he can pick up.

Pan also built a butane torch disguised as a lightsaber. In 2017, he appeared on MythBusters: The Search as a contestant and in 2020, Pan built a gun that shoots masks onto people's faces to protect them from COVID-19.

== Awards and nominations ==
Year	Award	Category	Result	Ref.
2023	Streamy Awards	Science and Engineering	Nominated	
