= Periscope rifle =

Firearm with a periscope for firing from behind cover

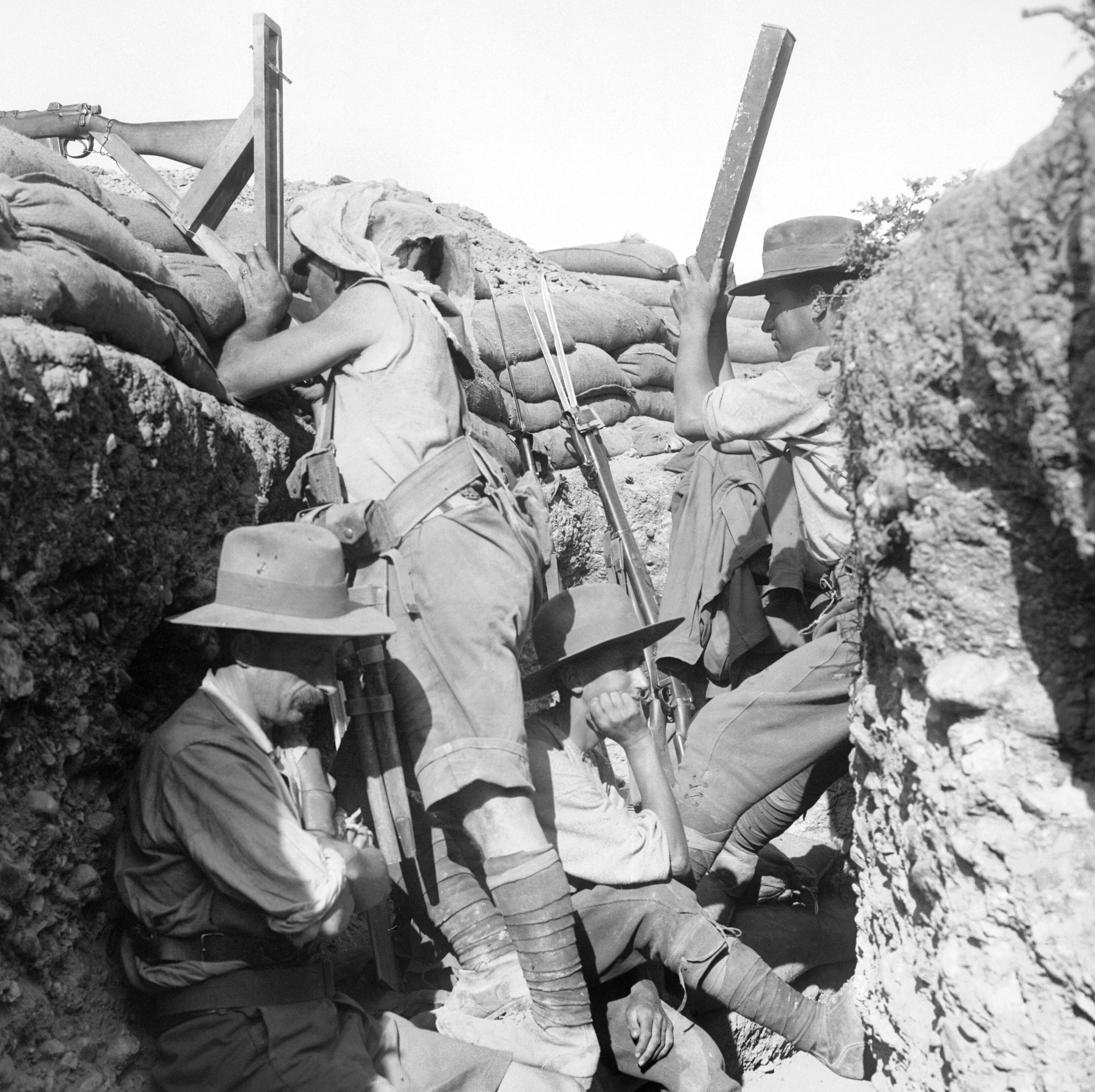
Australian light horseman using a periscope rifle, Gallipoli 1915. Photo by Ernest Brooks.

A periscope rifle is a rifle that has been adapted to enable it to be sighted by the use of a periscope. This enables the shooter to remain concealed below cover. The device was independently invented by a number of individuals in response to the trench warfare conditions of the First World War, and while it is not clear which army was the first to use periscope rifles, the weapons were in use by the end of 1914.

Similar devices were also built for use with machine guns. In 1916, another similar device was patented for use with pistols.

== Youlten hyposcope ==
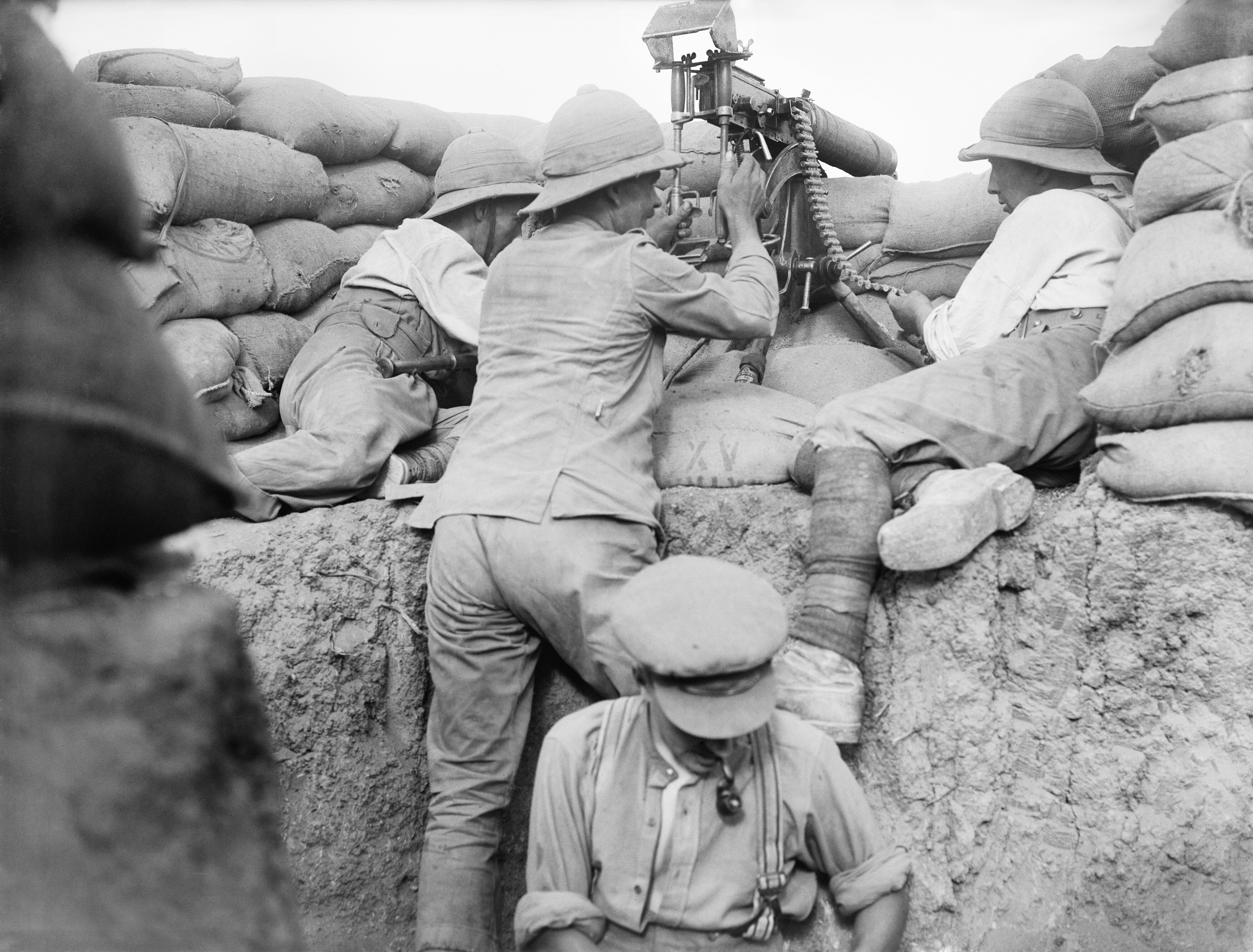
A Mark II Youlten’s Patent Hyposcope in use with a Vickers gun, at Gallipoli (1917).

The first periscope sighting rifle attachment was the Youlten hyposcope invented by William Youlten. An early version of the attachment was tested in 1903, receiving its first patent in 1914. Its maximum range was 600 yards (550 m).

== Beech's periscope rifle ==
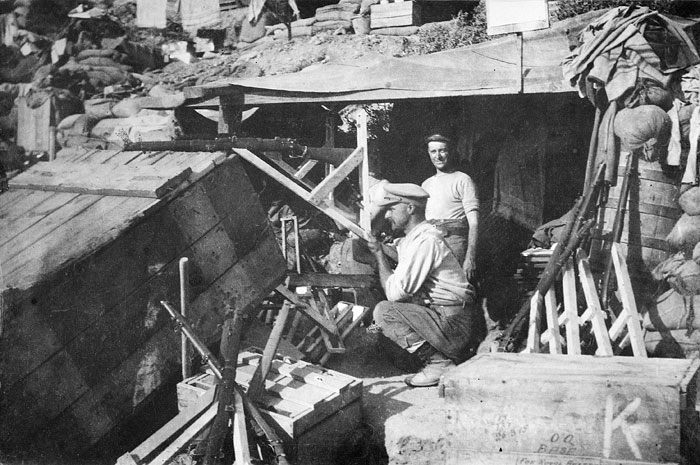
William Beech with his creation at Gallipoli in May 1915.

A form of periscope rifle was invented in May 1915 during the Gallipoli campaign by an Australian soldier, Lance Corporal, later Sergeant, William Beech (1875–1929), a builder's foreman in civilian life. At that time, Beech was serving in the 2nd Battalion, Australian Imperial Force (AIF). The device allowed a soldier to aim and fire a rifle from a trench without being exposed to enemy fire. Beech modified a standard Lee–Enfield .303 rifle by cutting the stock in half. The two halves were re-connected with a board and mirror periscope, horizontally aligned to the sights of the rifle, as well as a string to pull the trigger, which allowed the rifle to be fired from beneath the line of fire. According to the testimony of John Adams, a private who served with Beech, the idea came to Beech after the traumatic experience of seeing the bodies of fellow soldiers shot through the head.

Beech's device was quickly copied by other members of the Australian and New Zealand Army Corps (ANZAC). It saw extensive use in the intense trench warfare of Gallipoli, where some lines of trenches – such as at Quinn's Post – were within 50 metres (160 ft) of one another. According to a Gallipoli campaign participant, Sir David G. Ferguson, the use of conventional rifles during daytime was abandoned in favour of periscope rifles. It was generally regarded as significantly less accurate than a conventional Lee–Enfield, although the Official History of Australia in the War of 1914–1918 states it was accurate to 200–300 yards (180–270 m). A test conducted on the TV documentary series The Boffin, the Builder and the Bombardier suggested that the effective range was approximately 100 yards (91 m). However, during the Gallipoli campaign, a reduced effective range was not a significant problem as in many sectors, the Turkish and Allied trenches were close together. Some were only five yards apart.

Periscope rifles were later manufactured in crude production lines on the beach at Anzac Cove. Field Marshal Sir William Birdwood described the invention as one of considerable importance during the Gallipoli campaign. In 1921, the British War Office awarded Beech £100 for the invention (around £3,100 in 2015, when adjusted for inflation).

== Other World War I rifles ==
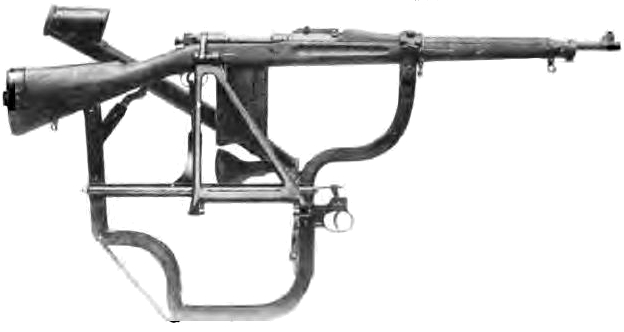
An Elder-type periscope stock fitted to an American M1903 Springfield rifle (1918); the rifle is also fitted with a 25-round magazine.

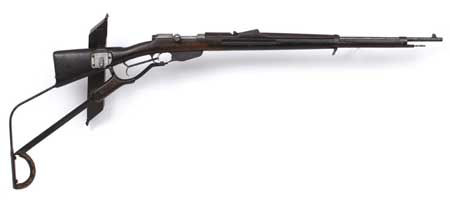
The Dutch M.95 periscope rifle

Two Lee–Enfield periscope adaptations were patented in September 1915. The first by J.E. Chandler was able to fire a full magazine before being dismounted, thanks to a fairly complicated mechanism to operate the bolt. The second by G. Gerard was of a similar design. This was followed by E.C. Robert Marks' design in 1916 and the patents of M.E. Reginald and S.J. Young in 1918.

On the Western Front, periscope rifles were used by the Belgian, British and French armies. On the Eastern Front, a periscope version of the Mosin–Nagant rifle was used by the Imperial Russian Army.

A number of periscope rifles including the "Elder" and the "Cameron-Yaggi" for the M1903 Springfield were devised in the United States. The Cameron-Yaggi was invented in 1914, but development of the model came to an end after the Armistice in November 1918. The Cameron-Yaggi mounting required no permanent alteration to the fitted rifle, and included a mechanism to operate the rifle's bolt. The aiming periscope also functioned as a 4-power telescopic sight. However, only around 12 were constructed.

The Cameron-Yaggi and Elder designs could be fitted with an enlarged magazine with 25 rounds, so as many shots as possible could be fired without needing to dismount the rifle below the trench parapet for reloading. An even more ingenious American design was the Guiberson periscope rifle, which featured a pop-out stock with a built-in periscope.

The Dutch designed the M.95 Loopgraafgeweer (Trench gun) based on the Dutch Mannlicher service rifle. It saw service with the Royal Netherlands Army from 1916 until World War II.

== See also ==
- Technology during World War I
- Loophole (firearm)

=== Similar weapons ===
- CornerShot
- Krummlauf
- POF Eye
