= Krummlauf =

Gun barrel attachment used for shooting around corners

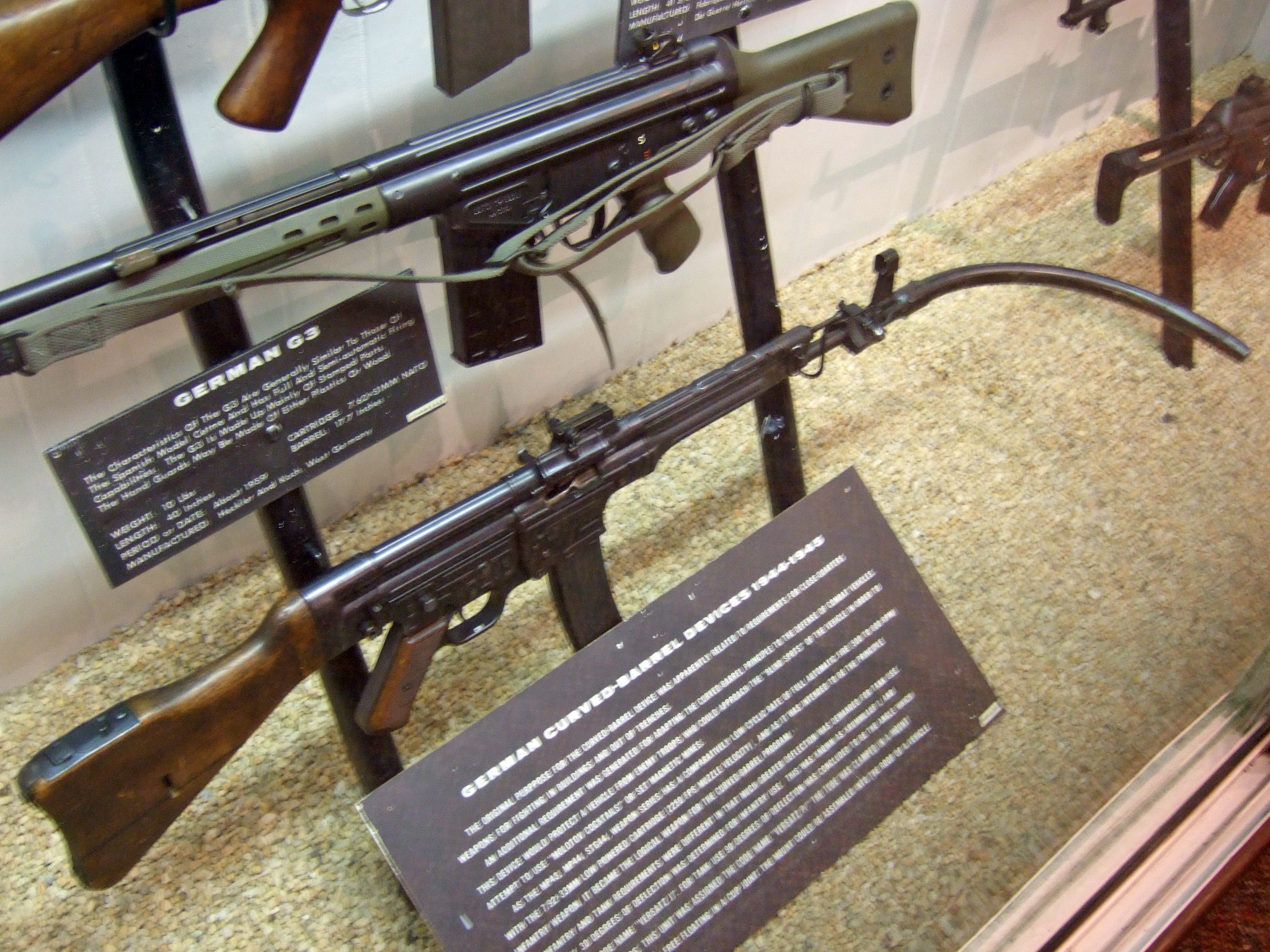
A Sturmgewehr 44 with 90° Krummlauf

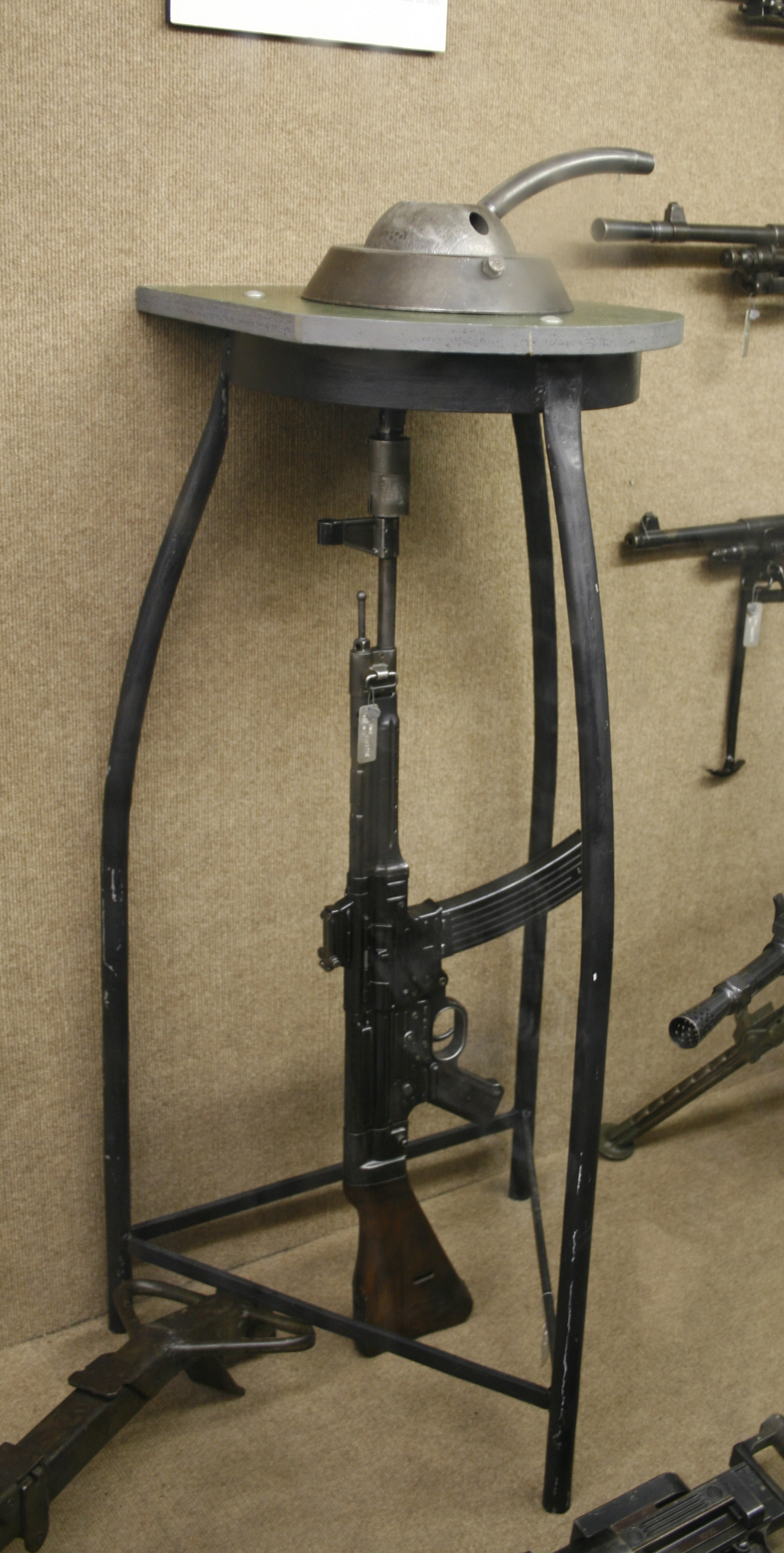
The Krummlauf installed on a Sturmgewehr 44 on display at the Bundeswehr Museum of German Defense Technology in Koblenz, Germany.

The Krummlauf (English: "curved barrel") is a bent barrel attachment for the Sturmgewehr 44 (StG 44) rifle developed by Germany in World War II. The curved barrel included a periscope sighting device for shooting around corners from a safe position.

== Description ==
It was produced in several variants: an "I" version for infantry use, a "P" version for use in tanks (to cover the dead areas in the close range around the tank and defend against assaulting infantry), versions with 30°, 45°, 60° and 90° bends, a version for the StG 44 and one for the MG 42. Only the 30° "I" version for the StG 44 was produced in many numbers.

The bent barrel attachments had very short lifespans—approximately 300 rounds for the 30° version, and 160 rounds for the 45° variant—as the barrel and bullets fired were put under great stress. Another problem besides the short life-span was that the bending caused the bullets to shatter and exit the barrel in multiple fragments, producing an unintended shotgun effect. As a result, weapons designers experimented with small vent holes drilled into the Krummlauf's barrel in order to reduce pressure and recoil, allowing the discharged bullets' built-up gases to be released to slow the bullet's velocity as it turned to exit the barrel. Nevertheless, the Krummlauf's lifespan remained the same. A triangular shield was also added to prevent venting gasses from clouding the mirror and optics.

The 30° model was able to achieve a 35×35 cm grouping at 100 m.

The Krummlauf in a Maschinenpistole Vorsatz (P) mount was developed as an alternative close defence weapon for tank destroyers. This mount was fitted to a roof hatch in many Panzer IV/70 (A) vehicles. The tank crew could then attach a StG 44 and use this as a close defence machine gun.

== Derivatives ==
Experiments to adapt the Krummlauf to the PPSh-41 were conducted by the Soviet Union.

== See also ==
- Félin FAMAS
- CornerShot
- Periscope rifle
