= Bowvayne =

British singer and writer

Bowvayne, born Andrew Knight, is a British writer, musician, composer, television and film writer, actor and animal rescuer currently living in America. In 2001 he completed his first album, Molten. In 2016 he completed his latest album, The Mark of Gold Light, at Abbey Road Studios.

== Books ==
Bowvayne's novel All Manner of Magic was the best-selling children's book at the 1990 Singapore International Book Fair. In 1992, he wrote four books for the well-known Australian Kangaroo Creek Gang series: Treasure Map, The Liar Bird, Superstickious and One Joke Too Many.

== Television and film ==
Bowvayne appeared on UK Channel 4's The Big Breakfast between 1993 and 1996. In 1994, he had a stand-up comedy slot at the Edinburgh Fringe.

== "Mythbusters" controversy ==
In January 2005, Bowvayne commenced legal proceedings in Australia against Beyond Productions, the producer of the MythBusters television show, alleging passing off in relation to the use of the name "Mythbusters", addressing that he had invented the word in 1988 and had used the name continuously since in relation to pursuing myths and mysteries around the world. He cited his series of books published by Penguin Books under the banner "Mythbusters" in 1991, 1993, and 1996. In February 2007, the Federal Court of Australia dismissed his claims against Beyond Productions. A parallel action, citing the same books, a collection of television appearances, a television pilot episode, Beyond's written response to Bowvayne's TV concept, and Beyond's Title and Business Searches (showing that Beyond had prior knowledge of his claim) was dismissed. In the UK, Beyond Properties Pty Limited was again a defendant; these claims were also dismissed.
