= Jon Lung =

American television personality

- Born: Jonathan Lung; New York City, U.S.
- Education: School of Visual Arts
- Occupations: television personality; product designer; graphic designer
- Website: Official website

Jonathan Lung is an American television personality, industrial designer and graphic designer, known as a co-host on the Science Channel TV series MythBusters, which premiered November 15, 2017, and is a revival of the 2003 – 2016 incarnation of the program. Lung and his co-host Brian Louden won their hosting duties on the reality television competition series MythBusters: The Search, which aired in January and February 2017.

== Early life ==
Jonathan Lung is originally from Brooklyn, New York City. He moved to Heartland Village, Staten Island as a child. He graduated from Susan Wagner High School then attended college at Lehigh University in Bethlehem, Pennsylvania. Lung attended the School of Visual Arts (SVA) in Manhattan, where he received his MFA in Products of Design in 2016. His MFA thesis project was aimed at encouraging people to be inventive and resourceful with everyday objects, and was inspired by the TV series MacGyver.

== Career ==
During the course of his upbringing and education, he amassed skills and techniques working with various woods, metals, foams, plastics, fabrics, papers, resins, silicones, and clays. In addition to designing and building furniture or generating concepts, prototypes and tests as a product designer, he works as a freelance graphic designer.

Lung appeared on the reality television competition program MythBusters: The Search, which premiered on The Science Channel in January 2017. Despite his lack of on-camera experience, his humor and technical expertise, which he displayed in challenges that included finding a needle in a haystack, building a boat out of cardboard and picking a handcuff lock with a bobby pin, impressed the judges, and by the end of the competition, he and his fellow contestant, Houston pilot and rescue diver Brian Louden, won the job co-hosting the TV series MythBusters, a reboot of the 2003 – 2016 program. The first 14-episode season of the new series premiered November 15, 2017. Lung commented, "I can't complain when every week I get to blow something up or build some insane machine. Every day, I check something off my bucket list."

== Personal life ==
Lung relocated to Los Angeles when he took the job of hosting MythBusters in 2017.

Lung spends time fabricating in his shop, as well as searching through junkyards, searching for parts to use. He also enjoys cooking.
