= The Boffin, the Builder and the Bombardier =

- Genre: Documentary history
- Created by: John Concannon
- Written by: John Concannon
- Directed by: Serge Ou
- Starring: John Concannon; Tony Miller; Will Upjohn
- Country of origin: Australia
- Original language: English
- No. of series: 1
- No. of episodes: 8

Production
- Editor: Douglas Kirk
- Running time: 10 minutes

Original release
- Network: ABC1
- Release: 31 March – 19 May 2013

The Boffin, the Builder and the Bombardier is an Australian documentary series produced in Canberra by Bearcage Productions and Concannon TV. The series had its debut in April 2013, when it screened weekly on the Australian Broadcasting Corporation's ABC1. It features a team of three people – John Concannon (the boffin), Will Upjohn (the builder), and Tony Miller (the bombardier) – who engage in "experimental archaeology" to lightheartedly recreate historical devices and test hypotheses based on their efficiency.

== Background ==
The series was created and written by John Concannon who also played the part of the "boffin" in the series, and was produced by Michael Tear, John Concannon, Serge Ou and Harriet Pike, with Serge Ou handling the direction. It was filmed around Canberra, using predominantly local resources, and the characters of the three main roles were based on the skills of the performers, with Will Upjohn, (the builder), working in construction, and Tony Miller involved in historical reenactments.

== Episodes ==
No.	Title	Original release date
1	"Hit Without Being Hit"	31 March 2013
The team recreate the Gallipoli Periscope Rifle to test its accuracy, as there were differing reports on the effectiveness of the weapon during World War I.
2	"Up, Up and Away"	7 April 2013
The second episode sees the recreation of the Chinese fire lance, testing the range and accuracy of both single weapons and a multi-launcher.
3	"The Last Drop"	14 April 2013
William Scurry's self-firing rifle, as used at the Gallipoli campaign during the Australian retreat, is tested.
4	"The Mad Minute"	21 April 2013
The three men test the rate of fire of the SMLE rifle, as used in World War I.
5	"Up, Up And Uh-Oh!"	28 April 2013
In the fifth episode, the team builds and tests a Leach Trench Catapult.
6	"Dancin' To Dixie"	5 May 2013
7	"The Enjun"	12 May 2013
8	"Shako, Rattle And Roll"	19 May 2013

== See also ==
- MythBusters
