= MythBusters: The Search =

Reality competition series

- Genre: Factual television; Science
- Created by: Jen Longhurst; Wyatt Channell; Marc Etkind; Peter Rees
- Based on: MythBusters
- Written by: Chris Williams
- Presented by: Kyle Hill
- Narrated by: Robert Lee
- Opening theme: "Mythbusters Theme Remix" by Neil Sutherland
- Composers: Udi Harpaz; Or Kribos; Dean McGinnes; JB Markham; Neil Sutherland
- Countries of origin: Australia; United States
- Original language: English
- No. of seasons: 1
- No. of episodes: 8

Production
- Camera setup: Multiple
- Running time: 42 minutes

Original release
- Network: Science Channel
- Release: January 7 – February 25, 2017

MythBusters: The Search is an American reality competition series that was broadcast by Science Channel. Premiering on January 7, 2017, the spin-off featured a field of contestants competing for a chance to become the hosts for a revival of MythBusters on Science Channel.

== History ==
The original run of MythBusters concluded in 2016, after its original hosts Adam Savage and Jamie Hyneman confirmed in October 2015 that the then-upcoming season would be their 14th and final season. In late March 2016, it was revealed by Variety that Discovery Channel's sister network Science was planning a spin-off reality series, tentatively titled Search for the Next MythBusters, which would determine hosts for a revival of the series.

In September 2016, it was announced that Nerdist science editor Kyle Hill would host the series.

The revival, featuring the winners Jon Lung and Brian Louden, premiered on Science in November 2017.

== Show format ==
The series started with 10 contestants; in each episode, contestants compete in one team task (two or three teams competing) and one individual task. In each task, as in the original MythBusters series, the contestants are instructed to scientifically test the validity of a claim (with some tasks based on or expanding from myths covered by previous episodes of MythBusters). At the end of each episode, an MVP is declared, who is granted immunity from elimination. In most episodes, the worst-performing contestant was eliminated.

== Contestants ==
– Winner
– Runner-up
– MVP

Contestant	Week 1	Week 2	Week 3	Week 4	Week 5	Week 6	Semi-Final	Final
Sarah Petkus		Eliminated						
Ben Nowack			Eliminated					
Jason Kerestes				Eliminated				
Dr. Tracy Fanara					Eliminated			
Chris Hackett		MVP					Eliminated	
Allen Pan								Eliminated
Martin Pepper			MVP					Runner-up
Tamara Robertson				MVP		MVP		Runner-up
Brian Louden	MVP							Winner
Jon Lung					MVP			Winner

== Episodes ==
No.	Title	Original release date
1	"Fast & Furious Ejector Seat"	January 7, 2017
Myths tested: Can the sideways ejector seat from 2 Fast 2 Furious be built? (confirmed); Does deflating a football make it easier to catch? (busted); MVP: Brian; Contestant eliminated: Sarah
2	"Painting with Explosives Revisited"	January 14, 2017
Myths tested: Can you paint with explosives? (busted); Does consuming alcohol boost creativity? (barely plausible); MVP: Hackett; Contestant eliminated: Ben
3	"Shooting Blind"	January 21, 2017
Myths tested: Can you build a boat from cardboard? (confirmed); Can you hit a target blindfolded, basing on sound? (plausible); MVP: Martin; Contestant eliminated: Jason
4	"Revenge of the Needle in a Haystack"	January 28, 2017
Myths tested: Is it hard to find a needle in a haystack? (confirmed); Can you pick handcuffs with a hairpin? (confirmed); MVP: Tamara; Contestant eliminated: Tracy
5	"The A-Team Challenge"	February 4, 2017
Myths tested: Is it possible to build a weapon from junkyard parts? (plausible); Is it impossible for an untrained person to ride a bicycle with reversed steering? (confirmed); MVP: Jon
6	"Hollywood Plane Landing"	February 11, 2017
Myths tested: Is it possible to scale a building using a portable vacuum cleaner? (plausible); Can an inexperienced person land a small plane by taking instructions over the radio? (plausible); MVP: Tamara; Contestant eliminated: Hackett
7	"Return of the Spy Car"	February 18, 2017
Myths tested: Can you build a spy car that blinds the pursuing car? (plausible); Is it possible to reduce fear by singing? (plausible); Contestant eliminated: Allen
8	"Exploding Grand Finale"	February 25, 2017
Myths tested: Can you use an exploding water heater to escape a jail? (busted); Can you build water-walking shoes out of duct tape and life jackets? (plausible)
