= MythBusters =

Science entertainment television program

- MythBusters title screen from 2003–2016
- Genre: Factual television; Science; Technology
- Created by: Peter Rees
- Presented by: Jamie Hyneman; Adam Savage; Kari Byron; Tory Belleci; Grant Imahara; Scottie Chapman; Jessi Combs; Jon Lung; Brian Louden; Bisi Ezerioha; Faye Hadley
- Narrated by: Robert Lee; Robin Banks (Europe)
- Opening theme: "MythBusters Demo Theme" by Daniel Thomas, Bob Brozman (composer) (2002); "MythBusters Original Theme" by Neil Sutherland (2003–2005); "MythBusters Original Theme" (2006 Remaster) by Neil Sutherland (2006–2010); "MythBusters Theme" (The Dandy Warhols Remix) by The Dandy Warhols (2011–2014; 2021); "MythBusters Theme Remix" by Neil Sutherland (2015–2018)
- Composers: Daniel Thomas (pilot); Bob Brozman (pilot); Neil Sutherland
- Countries of origin: United States; Australia
- Original language: English
- No. of seasons: 17 (Note: Each calendar year is defined as a season; this count includes the pilot season, but not the special season. On some listings and streaming/video-on-demand services, the season count is 19 for the original series.)
- No. of episodes: 296 (list of episodes)

Production
- Camera setup: Multiple
- Running time: 43–44 minutes (broadcast cut); 48–50 minutes (original cut)
- Production company: Beyond International

Original release
- Network: Discovery Channel
- Release: January 23, 2003 – March 6, 2016
- Network: Science Channel
- Release: November 15, 2017 – February 28, 2018

Related
- Head Rush; MythBusters: The Search; MythBusters Jr.; Savage Builds; Motor MythBusters; White Rabbit Project; MythBusters: There's Your Problem; The Great Escapists; Unchained Reaction

MythBusters is a science entertainment television series created by Peter Rees, and produced by Beyond International, in Australia. The series premiered on the Discovery Channel in 2003. It was broadcast on television networks and other Discovery channels worldwide. The show's original hosts, special effects experts Adam Savage and Jamie Hyneman, used elements of the scientific method to test the validity of rumors, myths, movie scenes, adages, Internet videos, and news stories.

Filmed in San Francisco, MythBusters aired 296 episodes before cancellation at the end of the 2016 season. Planning and experimentation took place at Hyneman's workshops in San Francisco. Experiments requiring more space or special accommodations were filmed on location, typically around the San Francisco Bay Area and elsewhere in Northern California, going to other states, or even countries, when required. During the second season, members of Savage and Hyneman's behind-the-scenes team were organized into a second team of MythBusters, "The Build Team". They generally tested myths separately from the main duo and operated from another workshop. This arrangement continued until 2014, when it was announced at the end of "Plane Boarding" that Tory Belleci, Kari Byron, and Grant Imahara would leave the show. Savage and Hyneman hosted the final two seasons alone. In October 2015, producers announced that MythBusters would air its 14th and final season in 2016. The show aired its final episode with the original cast on March 6, 2016.

Byron, Belleci, and Imahara led the Netflix show White Rabbit Project, which premiered in December 2016. Through experiments and tests, they delve into topics such as jailbreaks, superpower technology of fictional heroes, heists, and WWII weapons. The series was canceled after one season. In November 2017, sister network Science Channel revived MythBusters with new hosts Jon Lung and Brian Louden, who were selected by the competition spin-off MythBusters: The Search. The revival was filmed in Santa Clarita and other parts of Southern California, airing for two seasons until 2018. Savage returned in MythBusters Jr., a spin-off featuring children.

In 2021, Beyond Television produced and aired a new title of the franchise, Motor MythBusters, for Motor Trend. Belleci returned for the series and was joined by engineer Bisi Ezerioha and mechanic Faye Hadley. The series focused on testing myths and urban legends about automobiles. Excerpts of the original seasons (2003–2016) were used to produce MythBusters: There's Your Problem! for streaming services. In this repackaging, each episode is summarized to include only the experiments and conclusions.

The term MythBusters may be used to refer to both the program, and the cast members (without the italics) who test the experiments.

== History ==
The series concept was developed for the Discovery Channel as Tall Tales or True by Australian writer and producer Peter Rees of Beyond Productions in 2002. Discovery rejected the proposal initially because they had just commissioned a series on the same topic. Rees refined the pitch to focus on testing key elements of the stories rather than just retelling them. Discovery agreed to develop and co-produce a three-episode series pilot.

Jamie Hyneman was one of a number of special-effects artists who were asked to prepare a casting video for network consideration. Rees had interviewed him previously for a segment of the popular science series Beyond 2000 about the British–American robot combat television series Robot Wars. Adam Savage, who had worked with Hyneman in commercials and on the robot combat television series BattleBots, was asked by Hyneman to help co-host the show because, according to Savage, Hyneman thought himself too uninteresting to host the series on his own.

During July 2006, an edited 30-minute version of MythBusters began airing on BBC Two in the UK. The episodes shown on the European Discovery Channel sometimes include extra scenes not shown in the United States version. Some of these scenes are included in "specials", such as "MythBusters Outtakes".

The 14th season, which premiered in January 2016, was the final season for the series with Savage and Hyneman.

Adam Savage returned to TV with the show MythBusters Jr., without his original co-host Jamie Hyneman, but with a cast of teenagers, hence the name. The show debuted on the Science Channel on January 2, 2019 with rebroadcasts every Saturday morning on Discovery, as well as international broadcasts.

== Cast ==
Adam Savage and Jamie Hyneman are the original MythBusters, and initially explored all the myths of the series using their combined experience with special effects. The two worked at Hyneman's effects workshop, M5 Industries. They made use of his staff, who often worked off-screen, with Hyneman and Savage usually shown doing most of the work at the shop. The show is narrated by Robert Lee, though in some regions, his voice is replaced by a local narrator.

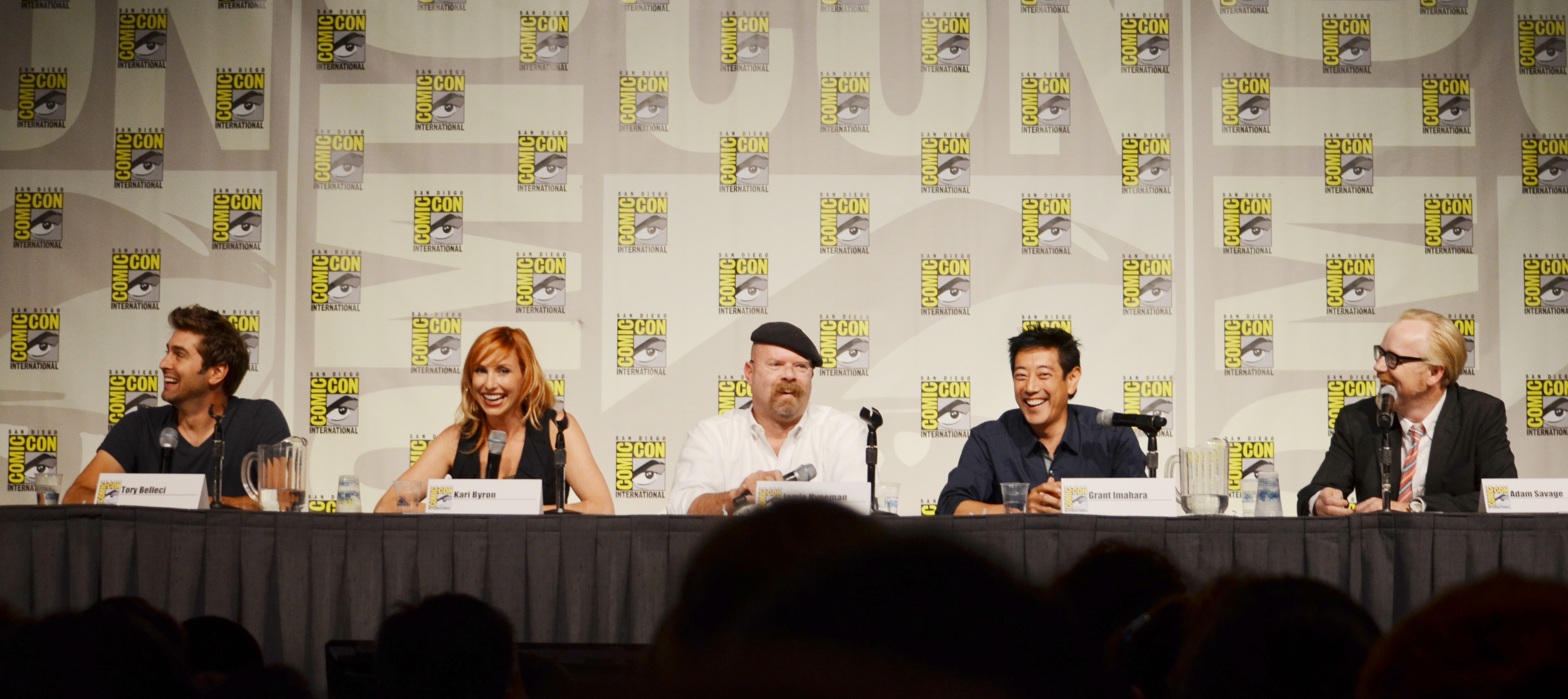
The cast of MythBusters at Comic Con, 2012

As the series progressed, members of Hyneman's staff were introduced and began to appear regularly in episodes. Three such members, artist Kari Byron, builder Tory Belleci, and metal-worker Scottie Chapman, were organized as a second team of MythBusters during the second season, dubbed the "Build Team". After Chapman left the show during the third season, Grant Imahara, a colleague of Hyneman's, was hired to provide the team with his electrical and robotics experience. Byron went on maternity leave in mid-2009, with her position on the Build Team temporarily filled by Jessi Combs, best known for co-hosting Spike's Xtreme 4x4.

Byron returned in the third episode of 2010 season. The Build Team worked at its own workshop, called M7, investigating separate myths from the original duo. Each episode typically alternated between the two teams covering different myths. During the Build Team's tenure, Belleci was the only member to appear in every myth that the team tested. At the end of the 2014 season finale "Plane Boarding", Savage and Hyneman announced that Byron, Belleci, and Imahara would not be returning in the 2015 season. This was reportedly over salary negotiations due to the rising cost of five hosts, however in a June 2025 podcast both Byron and Belleci confirmed that due to budget cuts they were offered contracts that comprised only three weeks of work, which when coupled with an exclusivity clause would have left them effectively unemployed. Hyneman and Savage returned to being the sole hosts. Byron, Belleci, and Imahara went on to host Netflix's White Rabbit Project.

The series had two interns, dubbed "Mythterns": Discovery Channel contest winner Christine Chamberlain and viewer building-contest winner Jess Nelson. During the first season, the program featured segments with folklorist Heather Joseph-Witham, who explained the origins of certain myths, and other people who had first-hand experience with the myths being tested, but those elements were phased out early in the series.

The MythBusters commonly consulted experts for myths or topics for which they needed assistance. These topics included firearms, for which they mostly consulted Lt. Al Normandy of the South San Francisco Police Department, and explosives, for which they consulted retired FBI explosives expert Frank Doyle and Sgt. J.D. Nelson of the Alameda County Sheriff's Office. The MythBusters often asked other people, such as those supplying the equipment being tested, what they knew about the myth under investigation. When guests were on the show, the MythBusters generally consulted them or included them in the experiments.

== Episodes ==
No consistent system was used for organizing MythBusters episodes into seasons. The program has never followed a typical calendar of on- and off-air periods. The official MythBusters website lists episodes by year. Discovery sells DVD sets for "seasons", which sometimes follow the calendar year and sometimes do not. Discovery and retail stores sell "collections", which divide up the episodes in a different way. Each collection has about 10 to 12 episodes from various seasons.

The following table is organized according to year of first broadcast. Including Specials and the revival series, a total of 296 episodes of MythBusters have aired so far.

Season	Episodes	Originally released	
Season	Episodes	First released	Last released
Pilots	3	January 23, 2003	March 7, 2003
2003	8	September 23, 2003	December 12, 2003
2004	17	January 11, 2004	December 22, 2004
2005	26	February 2, 2005	November 16, 2005
2006	28	January 11, 2006	December 13, 2006
2007	25	January 10, 2007	December 12, 2007
2008	20	January 16, 2008	November 19, 2008
2009	23	April 8, 2009	December 28, 2009
2010	24	January 4, 2010	December 22, 2010
2011	22	April 6, 2011	November 30, 2011
2012	21	March 25, 2012	November 25, 2012
2013	11	May 1, 2013	October 17, 2013
2014	15	January 4, 2014	August 21, 2014
2015	14	January 10, 2015	September 5, 2015
2016	12	January 2, 2016	March 6, 2016
2017	6	November 15, 2017	December 20, 2017
2018	8	January 3, 2018	February 28, 2018 (UK)
Specials	13	March 21, 2004	May 1, 2013

== Format ==
Each MythBusters episode focuses typically on two or more popular beliefs, Internet rumors, or other myths. Many of the myths are on mechanical effects as portrayed in live-action films and television of fictional incidents. The list of myths tested by the series is compiled from many sources, including the personal experiences of cast and crew, as well as fan suggestions, such as those posted on the Discovery Channel online MythBusters forums.

Occasionally, episodes are produced in which some or all of the myths are related by theme, such as pirates or sharks, and occasionally these are dubbed as "[Theme] Special" episodes. As of May 2009, four myths have required such extensive preparation and testing that they had entire episodes devoted solely to them, and four specials have been double-length. Several episodes, including the 2006 Holiday Special, have included the building of Rube Goldberg machines. Before a myth is introduced by the hosts, a myth-related drawing is made on a blueprint, save for in the final two seasons featuring Adam and Jamie. After the hosts introduce the myth, a comical video explaining the myth is usually shown.

=== Experiment approach ===
The MythBusters typically test myths in a two-step process. In early episodes, the steps were described as "replicate the circumstances, then duplicate the results" by Savage. This means that first the team attempts to recreate the circumstances that the myth alleges, to determine whether the alleged result occurs. If that fails, they attempt to expand the circumstances to the point that will cause the described result, which often reveals that the claims of the myth are objectively ridiculous or impossible to achieve without specialized training or equipment. Occasionally, the team, usually Savage and Hyneman, holds a friendly competition between themselves to see which of them can devise a more successful solution to recreating the results. This is most common with myths involving building an object that can accomplish a goal. For example, rapidly cooling a beer, or finding a needle in a haystack.

While the team obeys no specific formula in terms of physical procedure, most myths involve construction of various objects to help test the myth. They use their functional workshops to construct whatever is needed, often including mechanical devices and sets to simulate the circumstances of the myth. Human actions are often simulated by mechanical means to increase safety, and to achieve consistency in repeated actions. Methods for testing myths are usually planned and executed in a manner to produce visually dramatic results, which generally involves explosions, fires, or vehicle crashes. Thus, myths or tests involving explosives, firearms, and vehicle collisions are relatively common.

Results are measured in a manner scientifically appropriate for the given experiment. Sometimes, results can be measured by simple numerical measurement using standard tools, such as multimeters for electrical measurements, or various types of thermometers to measure temperature. To gauge results that do not yield numerical quantities, the teams commonly make use of several types of equipment that can provide other forms of observable effects. When testing physical consequences to a human body, which would be too dangerous to test on a living person, the MythBusters commonly use analogues.

Early episodes made heavy use of crash-test dummies for observing blunt trauma injury, and ballistic gelatin for testing penetrating trauma; whatever form and function it possessed, the dummy would always be named Buster. The crew progressed to using pig carcasses when an experiment required a more accurate simulation of human flesh, bone, and organs. Occasionally, real or simulated bones were molded within ballistics gel for simulations of specific body parts. Synthetic cadavers, or SynDavers, were used in a few tests such as in the "Car Cushion" myth.

Both for the purposes of visual observation to determine a result and simply as a unique visual for the program, high-speed cameras are used during experiments and have become a trademark of the series. Very fast footage of moving objects in front of a measured scale is commonly used to determine the speed of the object.

Testing is often edited due to time constraints of a televised episode. It can often seem as if the teams draw results from fewer repetitions and a smaller data set than they actually have. During the "Outtakes Special", they specifically stated that while they are, in fact, very thorough in testing myths and repeat experiments many times in many different configurations, it is simply impossible to display the entire process during a program. Beginning in the fifth season, episodes typically contain a prompt for the viewer to visit the show's homepage to view outtake footage of either additional testing or other facets of the myths being tested. However, Savage himself has acknowledged that they do not purport always to achieve a satisfactorily large enough set of results to overcome definitively all bias. In response to criticisms they receive about their methods and results in previous episodes, the staff produced several "Myths Revisited" episodes in which the teams retest myths to see if the complaints have merit. These episodes have sometimes resulted in overturning results of several myths, as well as upholding some results for reasons different from the original.

Occasionally, the MythBusters take the opportunity to test "mini-myths" during the course of one of the episode's main myths, usually in the name of satisfying personal curiosity. These can either be planned in advance to take advantage of the testing location—for instance, in the "Peeing on the Third Rail" myth Adam got permission to find out if placing coins on a train track was sufficient to derail a train (he found that the test locomotive was not affected at all)—or can simply take place without prior planning.

== Rejected myths ==
MythBusters refuse to test some myths. Paranormal concepts, such as aliens or ghosts, are not addressed because they cannot be tested by scientific methods, although one exception, pyramid power, prompted Adam to comment, "No more 'oogie-boogie' myths, please" and stated at a tour show in Indianapolis in 2012 that it was a mistake. Another myth related to the paranormal was the "Haunted Hum" myth, which involved testing if a particular, inaudible sound frequency can lead people to believe that an area is haunted.

The program generally avoided experiments harmful to live animals, though in one episode, they bombarded cockroaches and other laboratory insects with lethal doses of radiation. The cast addressed this, saying that the insects were specifically bred for experiments, and would have likely died anyway. However, animal carcasses, including those of pigs and chickens, were often used, but the MythBusters repeatedly emphasized that the animals died of natural causes.

The book MythBusters: The Explosive Truth Behind 30 of the Most Perplexing Urban Legends of All Time (ISBN 1-4169-0929-X) gives a list of a dozen myths that are unlikely to be explored, although four were eventually tested. Savage commented that testing myths that require them to disprove general claims is difficult because of the inherent difficulty in proving a negative. As a result, when they pursued such myths, they typically went about disproving specific methods that claim to achieve results.

Certain myths are not tested due to various objections by Discovery Channel or their advertisers, most notably myths pertaining to radio-frequency identification (RFID) vulnerability. Through nine seasons, 2,391 experiments were performed and 12 tons of explosives were used to test 769 myths. The team expressed reluctance to test conspiracy-theory myths, such as the JFK assassination or 9/11 conspiracies, although they have tested some of the conspiracy theories relating to the Apollo Moon landings.

== Outcomes of the experiments ==
By the end of each episode, the myths are rated "busted", "plausible", or "confirmed".

=== Busted ===
Myths are rated as "busted" when the myth's results cannot be replicated under either the described parameters or reasonably exaggerated ones. Often, when a myth is declared busted, the team will attempt to see what would be required to replicate the result of the myth through scientific means, discarding the original parameters of the myth itself. Going to absolute limits of what is physically possible to replicate the results is the origin of what is unofficially titled the MythBusters motto, "If it's worth doing, it's worth overdoing."

This is commonly referred to in the series as "the MythBusters way", and often reveals that the circumstances required to accurately recreate a "busted" myth are physically impossible or highly unlikely to occur with the scientific facts presented, or the equipment used in the myth used to gain the results is neither available to the general public, nor capable of producing the results. For example, when trying to see if diamonds can be made with a microwave, the myth was busted, and the team arranged with an expert to have diamonds created with a large quantity of explosives.

Some of these myths are retested if the viewers are dissatisfied with the results, and are declared "rebusted" if the results of this second attempt result in the same conclusions as the original attempts. On rare occasions, retested myths result in a conclusion different from the first attempt, usually going from "busted" the first time, to "plausible" or even "confirmed" on the retest.

=== Plausible ===
Plausible is awarded under a few circumstances:

- The myth's results can only be replicated by expanding some parameters of the myth by a realistic and reasonable margin. This may have been because of the myth having been altered slightly over time in being told and retold. Also, certain materials may have had to be substituted for others, but the substitute materials are almost always very similar to the ones specified and usually are readily available.
- If no documentation of the myth occurred at the time of the episode's production, yet the MythBusters were still able to duplicate it very closely to the way it was described (such as the myth that pirates wore eye patches to keep their night vision, or an untrained pilot was talked through landing an airplane).
- If the myth's results are achieved using the method described, but the underlying reason is different from the one described in the myth (such as in the myth of throwing a fire extinguisher into a fire to make it explode and extinguish the fire).
- If it requires a highly improbable set of circumstances, yet is shown to be possible under similar artificial circumstances, plausible is used. For example, in the myth of "Can two colliding bullets fuse together?", two bullets were shown to fuse together, but it would be exceedingly difficult to get two period guns with period ammunition to collide in the correct way. The results can be created in a similar laboratory setting, but the chances of the myth actually happening as described are remote.
- If the results stated in the myth are attainable, but in such a way as to make the process either highly dangerous or less efficient than more common methods of achieving the same result, plausible is used. For example, in "Car vs. Rain", the MythBusters declared the myth "plausible (but not recommended)", due to the danger in driving a car at high speeds on a wet road, though the myth was completely true.
- If a positive result is attained using surrogates for living creatures, but the procedure would result in injury or death to an actual creature. For example, in "Holiday Special", two ballistics-gel replicas of pet dogs were used to test the myth that a falling frozen turkey would crush a household pet; both replicas sustained serious injuries, as determined by a veterinarian, but the myth was only dubbed "plausible", as the Build Team was unwilling to test actual pets.
- Occasionally, a myth is labelled plausible if the described scenario produces a result similar to but less intense than the one described in the myth.

=== Confirmed ===
The term "true" was used instead of "confirmed" in the first season.

- The MythBusters are able to recreate or closely recreate the myth's purported outcome with the described circumstances. A "confirmed" myth is usually corroborated with documented evidence of actual occurrences.
- If the myth lacks any specific scenarios, the MythBusters test every reasonable scenario, and just one scenario is enough for them to confirm the myth. For example, when testing to see whether shooting fish in a barrel was in fact very easy, in most tests, they could not hit the fish with a bullet, but the energy transfer to the water by the bullet was lethal to the fish; therefore, the myth was confirmed.
- If no instances of the event are documented as occurring in real life, but the myth was taken from a specific scene or character in a specific movie, the myth is confirmed if they are able to replicate it with the same circumstances. For example, the Build Team gave a verdict of "confirmed" for a scene in Point Break where two skydivers—one without a parachute—jumped off the plane at different times, and yet the second jumper was able to catch up to the first jumper. Though no cases of this ever being attempted in real life were documented, it was confirmed nonetheless, since it only came from a single scene in a specific movie. The same applied to the myth about the Knight Rider driving his car at highway speeds into a semi-trailer truck via ramp, without any trouble; though Adam and Jamie found no real-life occurrences of the stunt other than movie or television productions, it came from a specific TV show, and thus was confirmed.
- In rare circumstances, a myth is considered confirmed when the testing process is intentionally stopped but news reports or other documentation are available that confirm it has happened at least once; in testing the jet taxi myth (in which a taxicab is flipped by the engine of a jet aircraft), both Adam and Jamie agreed that the myth could not be replicated accurately for insurance reasons, but news footage verified that such an event is possible. (In this case, three years later, they were allowed to return to the subject and confirm the myth using a Boeing 747.)

== Warnings and self-censorship ==
Many of the myths tested involve purported household scenarios, so all episodes begin with a disclaimer against attempting the experiments seen on the series; most episodes also feature a second warning halfway through the running time. These disclaimers are not broadcast on SBS in Australia, in the Netherlands, Discovery Mix in Sweden, Samsung TV plus MythBusters channel in the United Kingdom, Select DVDs in the United States, the Discovery Channel in Denmark, or on the Prime and Sky Discovery Channels in New Zealand. Often, they are presented with an element of humor, such as Savage wearing a padded suit as Hyneman hits him in the chest with a baseball bat, or Hyneman explaining that Savage and he are professionals before Savage slides into view and crashes into a barrier, while saying, "Don't try this at home!"

The series employs various degrees of safety- or courtesy-related censorship. Vulgar language is censored, as the show is considered family friendly, and most such language occurs spontaneously when the team is surprised or overexcited; at other times, a deliberate effort is made to keep the scripted material clean. In addition to the standard bleep, the show often uses a relevant or humorous sound effect. Euphemisms and scientific terminology are used for potentially offensive terms. (Note: For example, when testing myths about flatulence, the crew called the phenomenon by its scientific designation (e.g. "flatulence" or "flatus"), while the word "fart" was bleeped out.)

In the "Peeing on the Third Rail" myth, the show censored the valve used to release urine from the dummy. The names of ingredients used in the production of hazardous materials and some explosives are usually censored to prevent amateurs from recreating potentially dangerous substances. For example, in the "Hindenburg" special, Savage ignited thermite with a hypergolic mixture of "blur" (a syrupy, pale blue liquid) and "blur" (a dark powder). In a Civil War–themed episode, the ingredients for making a form of homemade black powder were censored in similar fashion.

In one extreme instance of self-censorship, the team explored an urban legend stating that a widely available material could be used to create an explosive. To their surprise, the seemingly unlikely legend proved true, but the material was so easy to obtain, and the resulting explosion so powerful, that the production team decided allowing such information to reach the general public would be irresponsible, instead electing to destroy all footage of the experiment and agreeing never to speak of the incident. Several years later, when DARPA solicited advice from the public regarding potentially unknown bomb risks, Savage contacted them about their discovery.

In another episode that focused on myths surrounding electronic security devices, a segment was aired on defeating biometric fingerprint readers using various methods. One of these techniques involved creating a fake three-dimensional fingerprint from a two-dimensional image of the authorized print. After some trial and error, the team successfully cast a viable ballistics gel reproduction using a copper-coated printed circuit board, a picture of the fingerprint printed on acetate, and a photochemical acid etching process.

After the reproduction was shown to defeat both fingerprint scanners, and although the chemicals used during the etching process are never identified, the narrator still hints at an important step having been edited out and discourages viewers from trying it themselves. None of the other techniques that successfully defeated the fingerprint scanners or the other security devices tested in the episode were censored or obfuscated, perhaps because the rest were all fairly simple and straightforward methods, such as holding up a bedsheet or moving extremely slowly to hide from ultrasonic motion detectors or holding up a pane of glass to defeat thermal motion detectors.

Brand names and logos are regularly blurred or covered with tape or a MythBusters sticker. Brand names are shown when integral to a myth, such as in the Diet Coke and Mentos experiment or Pop Rocks in the first pilot episode of MythBusters.

The Diet Coke and Mentos experiment is also an outlier regarding their safety warnings, as Savage and Hyneman stated on-air that this myth was perfectly safe for viewers to replicate on their own. Another example of this is the "Phone Book Friction" episode, in which they investigated the difficulty of pulling two telephone books apart after their pages had been interleaved. One episode from the 2014 season, "DO Try This at Home?", classified several myths as safe or unsafe for testing by viewers.

== Accidents ==
Owing to the nature of the experiments performed on the show, many did not go as expected. Sometimes, these mishaps rendered the test equipment unusable, such as when the rocket in the "Rocket Car Revisit" episode exploded on ignition. Others even resulted in minor injuries to the personnel involved with the show, such as when Belleci banged his knee falling off a fire tower; the fall was expected and prepared for using a safety harness, but the injury to his knee was unforeseen. The most common injuries were caused when moving safety equipment, which resulted in stitches and at least four broken fingers. These kinds of incidents were usually included in the broadcast program, with little other media attention, but some things failed in more spectacular and newsworthy ways.

=== Esparto accident ===
On March 20, 2009, the town of Esparto, California, was shaken and windows were shattered by a blast created by 500 pounds (230 kg) of ANFO during filming of the myth "Knock Your Socks Off". Some residents were upset that the blast took place without "telling anyone". Chief Barry Burns of the Esparto Fire Department had several firefighters present for the explosion. He said he made the decision not to notify anyone in town for safety's sake. "MythBusters is supposed to be a really popular show. Everybody would have been out there. We would have had to cancel it because it would have been too dangerous." Representatives from the show replaced some of the windows that same day. The experiment did air, but the hosts recounted in a 2011 special episode ("Location, Location, Location") that they have never returned to the Esparto quarry as a result of the mishap.

=== Cannonball accident ===
On December 6, 2011, while conducting the "Cannonball Chemistry" experiment, the MythBusters crew accidentally sent a cannonball through the side of a house and into a minivan in a Dublin, California, neighborhood. Although the experiment was being carried out at the Alameda County Sheriff's Bomb Range under the supervision of the Alameda County Sheriff's Office, the errant projectile went over its intended target of water barrels and instead skipped up a hill that was intended as a secondary safety measure. The cannonball soared 700 yards (640 m) into a neighboring community, striking a house and leaving a 10-inch (250 mm) hole, before striking the roof of another house and smashing through a window of a parked minivan. No one was hurt by the rogue cannonball.

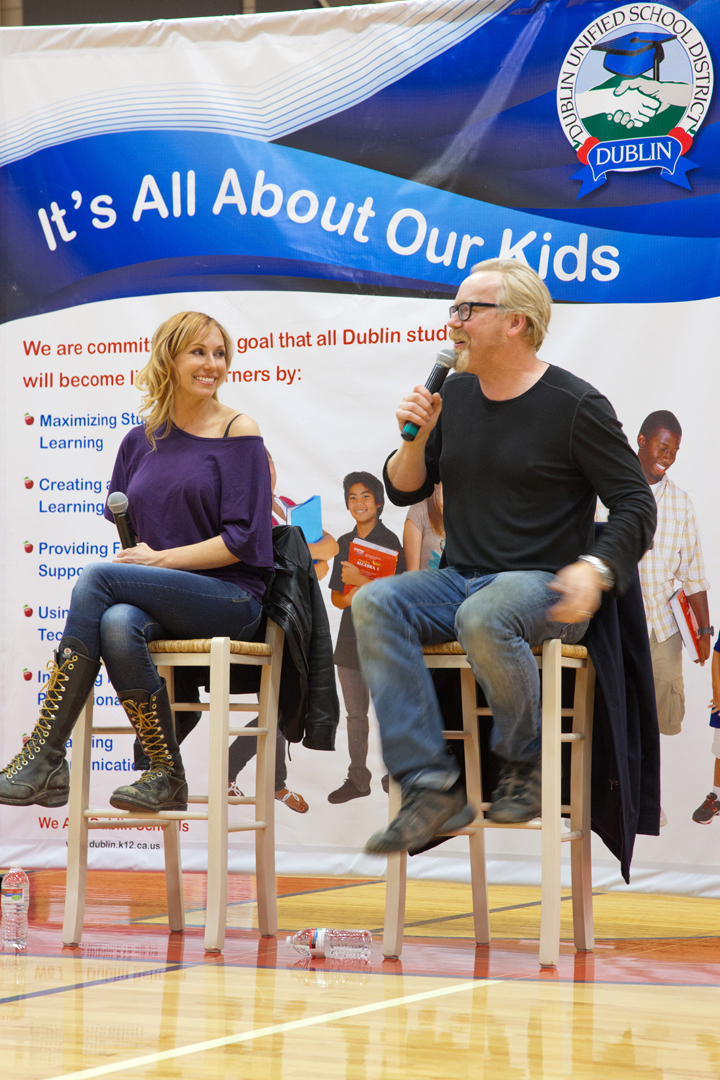
Savage and Byron at Dublin High School in 2012

A show producer visited the homeowners to apologize, followed by Savage and Hyneman; Savage later stated that the incident would not cause the series production to be suspended. Savage and Kari Byron returned to Dublin High School on February 22, 2012, to participate in a moderated panel session at Dublin High School's Engineering and Design Academy Open House during National Engineers Week 2012, in part to help repair relations with the community. The sold-out event attracted over 1,000 attendees.

During the airing of the experiment on November 11, 2012, the Build Team apologized for the accident and explained that they suspended testing after it occurred to assess damage and start an investigation. The testing resumed several months later at a rock quarry in a much more remote area.

== Name lawsuit ==
In January 2005, children's author and adventurer Andrew Knight commenced legal proceedings in Australia against Beyond Productions, the producer of MythBusters, alleging passing off in relation to the use of the name "MythBusters". Knight asserted that he had previously organized a team of "MythBusters" and had used the name continuously since 1988 in relation to pursuing myths, ghosts, monsters, goblins, and other such mysteries in an offbeat manner around the world. Knight wrote a series of self-published children's books under the banner "MythBusters" in 1991, 1993, and 1996.

In February 2007, the Federal Court of Australia dismissed Knight's claims against Beyond Productions. A parallel action, relying on the same three books and a collection of short television appearances, was brought later that year in the Chancery Division of the High Court of England and Wales. Beyond Properties Pty Limited was again a defendant, as were two other Beyond companies and Discovery Communications Inc, the entity responsible for broadcasting the MythBusters program in the UK. These claims were also dismissed.

== Popularity and influence ==
Hyneman and Savage have appeared on numerous entertainment programs, such as Good Morning America, the Late Show with David Letterman, NPR's news program All Things Considered, the syndicated radio Bob and Tom Show, and in the movie The Darwin Awards (as two military surplus vendors who sold a JATO rocket to the main character). Skeptic magazine's Daniel Loxton interviewed the duo in a 2005 article titled "MythBusters Exposed". Hyneman and Savage spoke at the annual convention of the National Science Teachers Association in March 2006, and the California Science Teachers Association named them honorary lifetime members in October 2006. In 2009, they were the featured keynote speakers at RSA Conference. They also are occasionally interviewed for articles by Popular Mechanics and are featured in that magazine's September 2009 issue.

Hyneman and Savage occasionally appear at colleges around the United States to talk about what it is like to be a MythBuster; the show consists of an interview and discussion to give the audience the opportunity to ask the MythBusters questions. The Build Team members have sometimes made appearances in similar capacity. They hold lectures in both collegiate and corporate settings, though the technical colleges tend to be the most enthusiastic. They have spoken at WPI, RPI, MIT, Michigan Tech, UC Berkeley and many others.

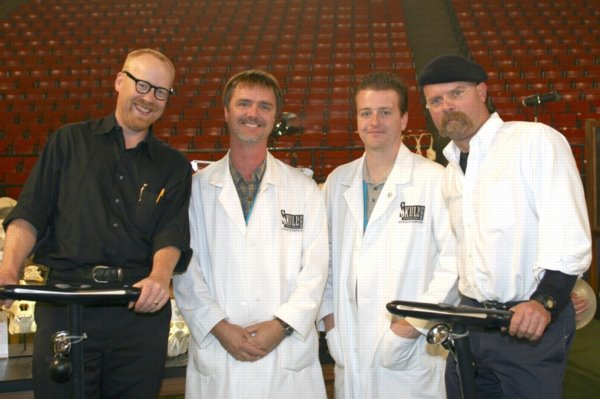
At the Discovery Channel Young Scientist Challenge posing with Skulls Unlimited International, Inc.'s Jay Villemarette and Joey Williams, 2004

Adam Savage has written a primer on mold-making for Make magazine, and has been featured guest at the San Mateo Maker Faire since 2008. Kari Byron was interviewed on The Late Show, on January 16, 2006.

People involved in survival stories reported in local newscasts have sometimes mentioned previous viewings of MythBusters as an influence to their actions. Twenty-three-year-old Theresa Booth of St. Martin, Minnesota, credits a MythBusters episode for her infant child and her survival. On April 3, 2007, she skidded off the road into a drainage ditch, which had filled with flood water from the Sauk River. Unable to open the door, Booth recalled the "Underwater Car" myth and waited until the pressure equalized to open the door. On October 19, 2007, in Sydney, Australia, a teenager named Julian Shaw pulled a fainted middle-aged man off the railway tracks near a train station to safety below the platform. He pulled back as the train passed, citing that the "Train Suction" episode affected his response.

The 3rd Annual Independent Investigative Group IIG Awards presented an award to MythBusters recognizing the promotion of science and critical thinking in popular media on May 18, 2009.

On the May 1, 2008, episode of CSI, "The Theory of Everything", Hyneman and Savage appeared in a cameo as observers taking notes during a test to determine whether a stun-gun bolt can set someone on fire under various circumstances (which was later tested on MythBusters itself).

During August 2008, Hyneman and Savage appeared on the stage of NVISION 08, an event sponsored by Nvidia, having been asked by Nvidia's creative director, David Wright, to provide a visual demonstration of the power of the graphics processing unit vs a central processing unit. They did this by creating an image of the Mona Lisa with a giant parallel processing paintball gun, setting a world record for largest paintball gun in the process. An encore of the demonstration was given at YouTube Live featuring Hyneman standing in the path of the paintballs wearing a suit of armor.

On the April 17, 2012, episode of NCIS, "Rekindled", the character Abby Sciuto demonstrates a thermite fire to her boss, Jethro Gibbs, by playing a clip from the MythBusters episode "End with a Bang". Gibbs asks if the men in the clip are pyromaniacs, and she replies, "Scientists, Gibbs! Okay, yeah, they're kind of pyromaniacs too".

Hyneman, Savage, and others from the MythBusters crew have appeared at The Amaz!ng Meeting, and subsequently were interviewed by Steven Novella and the "skeptical rogues" for the podcast The Skeptics' Guide to the Universe. On April 16, 2010, Hyneman and Savage received the Outstanding Lifetime Achievement Award in Cultural Humanism from the Harvard Humanist Chaplaincy.

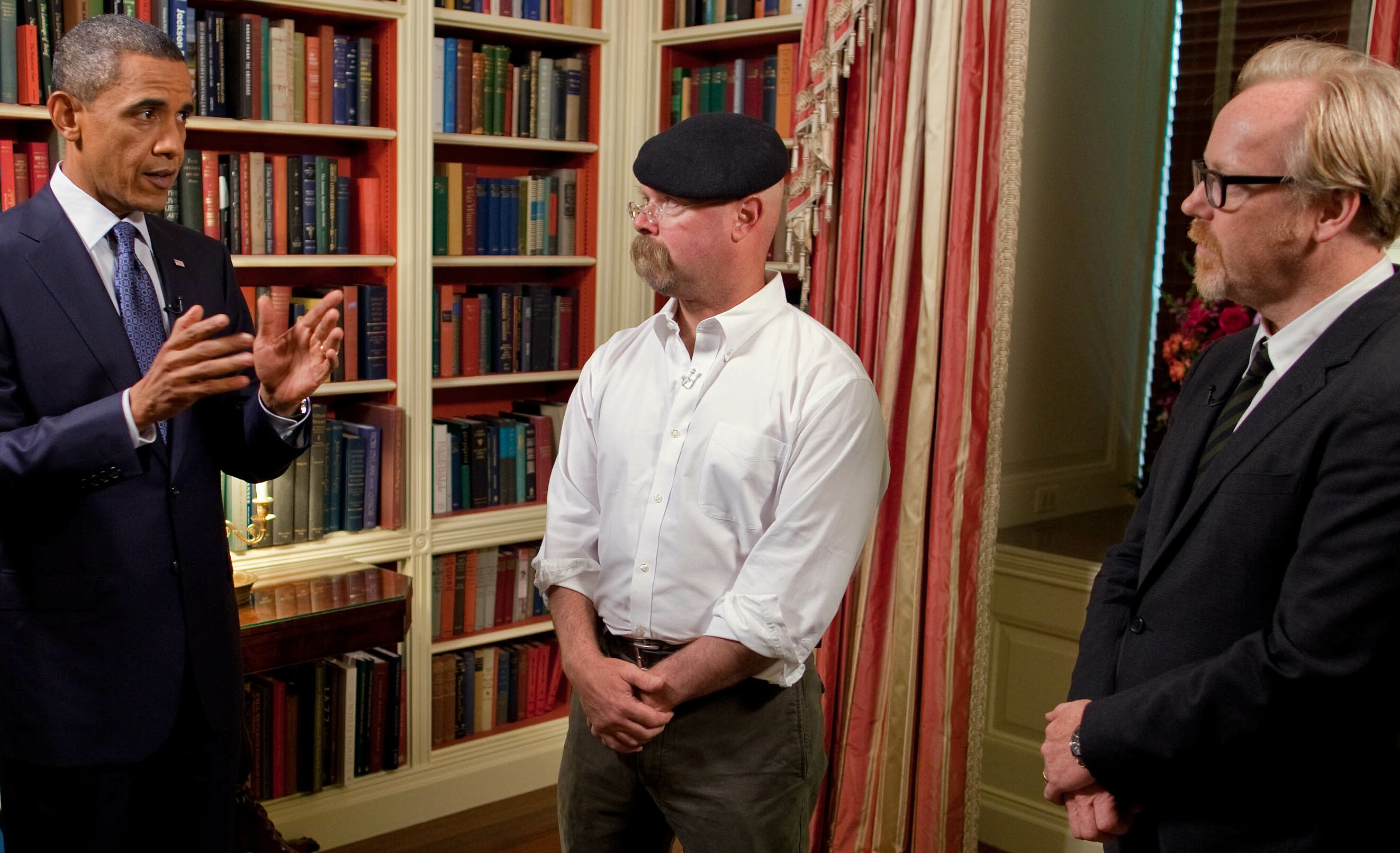
At the White House

On October 18, 2010, President Barack Obama, as part of the White House Science Fair, announced he had taped a segment of MythBusters and would appear on December 8, 2010. Obama's segment covered the Archimedes solar ray myth.

Both men appeared at the Rally to Restore Sanity and/or Fear on October 30, 2010, in Washington, DC. They had an experiment with the crowd involving the wave. They had the audience make various noises (e.g. popping their cheeks or laughing) all at the same time. They also had everyone in the crowd jump up at the same time to see if it would register on a seismograph.

Hyneman and Savage received honorary doctorates from the University of Twente in the Netherlands for their role in popularizing science, on the occasion of the university's 50th anniversary, on November 25, 2011.

All five MythBusters have also appeared in new shows, segments, or specials for Discovery's Science Channel, including Head Rush (Byron, 2010–2011); Punkin Chunkin 2010 (Hyneman and Savage); Flying Anvils 2011 (Belleci); Road to Punkin Chunkin 2011, and Punkin Chunkin 2011 (Belleci, Byron, and Imahara); Large Dangerous Rocket Ships 2010 and Large Dangerous Rocket Ships 2011 (Byron); "Killer Robots: RoboGames 2010" (Imahara); Curiosity (Savage); Punkin Chunkin 2012 (Belleci, Byron and Imahara). Savage and Hyneman are judges on the game show Unchained Reaction, which premiered in March 2012. Belleci and Byron were also hosts of the 2015 Science Channel show Thrill Factor.

Aired on February 12, 2012, Hyneman and Savage lent their voices to The Simpsons episode "The Daughter Also Rises" to be featured on a show similar to MythBusters called Mythcrackers in which Hyneman and Savage take on the classic myth that a cat always lands on its feet. In the episode, they do not want to harm a real cat, so they took a Build A Bear carcass, stuffed it with ballistics gel, shot it with a 20-foot-barrel steam cannon, then made a scatter plot of the remains. By the end of the experiment, Hyneman asked, "What was it we were trying to prove again?", to which Savage replied, "Don't know, don't care." Clips from this show appeared in the MythBusters' Simpsons Special that first aired in 2015.

On October 3, 2012, Byron and Belleci made a guest appearance on the Discovery series Sons of Guns. They test-fired some of the weapons in the Red Jacket shop, then watched as the staff retested a myth busted by the Build Team in 2008, that a propane tank could explode when hit with a bullet.

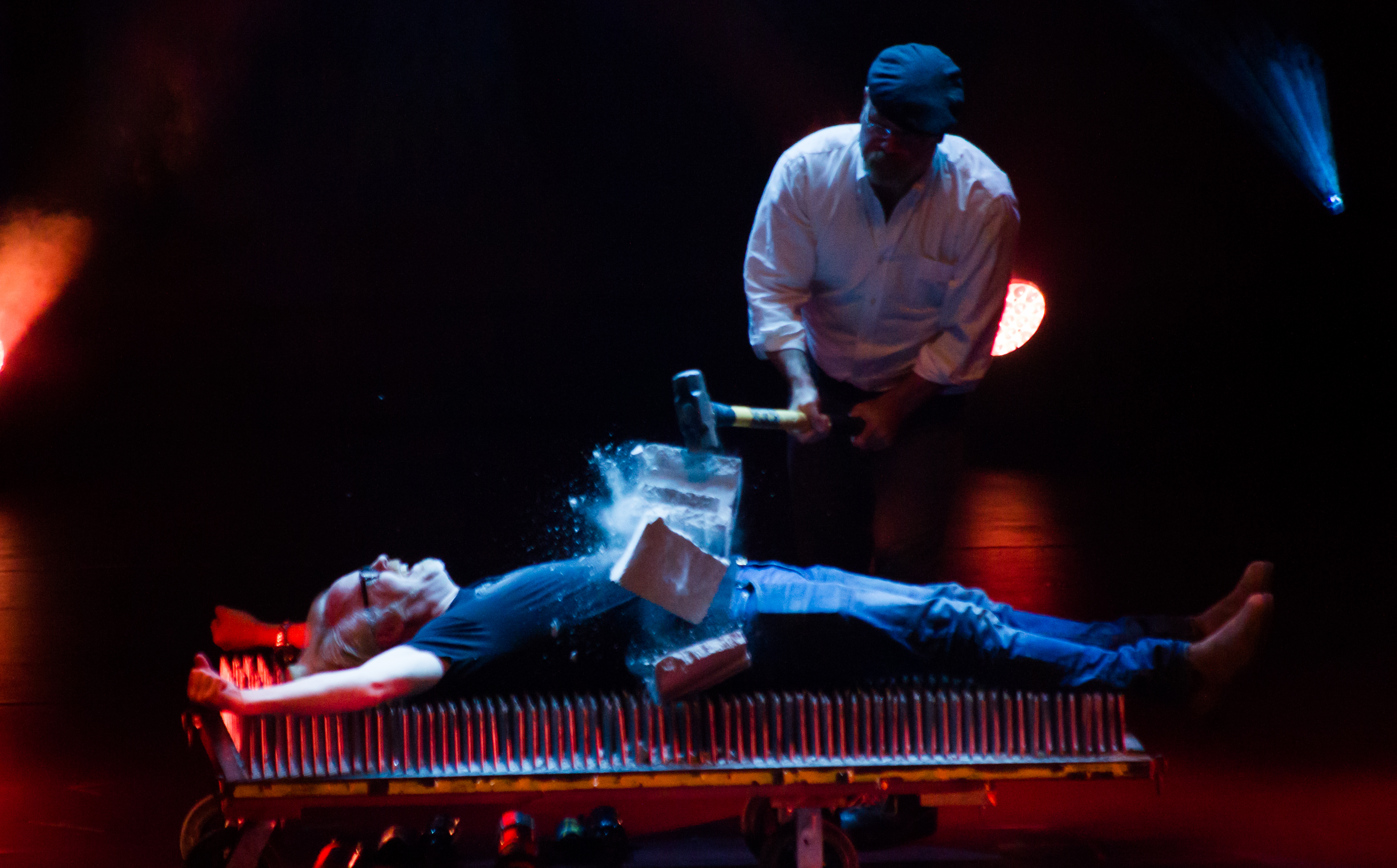
The MythBusters at a 2015 performance in Iowa

In 2015, Hyneman and Savage appeared in a series of Australian television commercials for Dulux paint, depicting them testing the maker's claims of durability.

In 2016, a New York Times study of the 50 television shows with the most Facebook likes found that MythBusters "has the second-highest share of 'likes' from men of any show in the data, after Fast N' Loud".

=== Tours and exhibits ===
A traveling museum exhibit called "MythBusters: The Explosive Exhibition" was developed over the course of about five years, premiering at the Museum of Science and Industry, Chicago, in March 2012.

In 2011, Savage and Hyneman created a live stage show called the MythBusters Behind the Myths Tour, in which they conduct experiments on-stage and discuss some background details of the show.

In March 2014, they announced that the tour would be coming to Australia and New Zealand.

The show and one particular episode (involving the myth of a cigarette being able to cause a fire when thrown into a pool of gasoline) was credited with helping to free a man from prison.

== International broadcasts ==
MythBusters is broadcast in several countries, primarily by each country's version of the Discovery Channel. In some countries, the English speech is either subtitled in the relevant language, or the narration voice-over is replaced, or the entire show (narration and hosts' voices) is dubbed. The United States customary units, used by the hosts throughout the show, are converted to metric in the process. In the UK since 2011, the use of US customary units in the show has often been retained, rather than being replaced with metric units. Sometimes, the part where the myth is explained in sketches is completely redrawn in that language. Excerpts of the show were also shown as part of the Beyond Television–produced Beyond Tomorrow, revoiced by Matt Shirvington.

== Revival and spin-offs ==
In late March 2016, Variety revealed that Discovery's sister network Science Channel was planning to produce a revival of MythBusters with a new cast, and that its hosts would be determined by a reality competition spin-off, Search for the Next MythBusters (later renamed MythBusters: The Search), which was hosted by Nerdist's Kyle Hill. The revival, hosted by Brian Louden and Jon Lung, would premiere its first, 14-episode season on November 15, 2017.

In September 2016, Beyond announced it was producing a new original series for Netflix, White Rabbit Project, starring Byron, Belleci, and Imahara. It ran for one season of 10 episodes.

In April 2018, Adam Savage was announced to be returning to the franchise to host and executive produce a new spin-off, MythBusters Jr., with a 10-episode first season, which premiered in December 2018 with a sneak-peek episode, and the series officially starting January 2, 2019. The series features Savage working with a group of six young scientists. Savage stated that his goal for the series was to "start passing on everything to the next generation" as he grows older.

In 2021, an automotive-focused spin-off was produced called Motor MythBusters, with original Build Team member Tory Belleci being joined by Faye Hadley of the All Girls Garage series and professional race car driver Bisi Ezerioha. Robert Lee once again provided some voice over work for this series. The 13-episode series, which premiered on August 4, 2021, was initially only available on the Motor Trend app in the United States, before being released through Amazon Prime Video, and having its premiere on Motor Trend's TV channel on January 18, 2022. In 2021 Beyond also repackaged segments from the original series grouped into themed episodes to create a spin-off called MythBusters: There's Your Problem.

In June 2025, Kari Byron and Tory Belleci launched the Mythfits podcast, in which they explore contemporary science, history and culture as well as revisit their time on the show.

Savage has stated that he is unlikely to work with Hyneman on any future projects, stating that although they worked well together as a classic example of a double act (with Hyneman as the straight man), their personalities clashed off-screen and on-screen. Savage suspected that both Hyneman and he were enjoying spending time apart from each other.

== See also ==
=== Similar television series ===
- Bang Goes the Theory
- Bigger, Better, Faster, Stronger
- The Boffin, the Builder and the Bombardier
- Brainiac: Science Abuse
- Duck Quacks Don't Echo
- Dude, What Would Happen
- Food Detectives
- It's Effin' Science
- jackass
- Man vs. Cartoon
- Mega Builders
- Penn & Teller Tell a Lie
- Prototype This!
- Proving Ground
- The Re-Inventors
- Rock and Roll Acid Test
- Scrapheap Challenge
- Smash Lab
- Time Warp
- Top Gear
- Unchained Reaction
- Urban Legends
- White Rabbit Project

=== General ===
- List of common misconceptions
- The Skeptic's Dictionary
- Snopes.com
- The Straight Dope
- Urban legend
