= Stuck with Hackett =

Television series

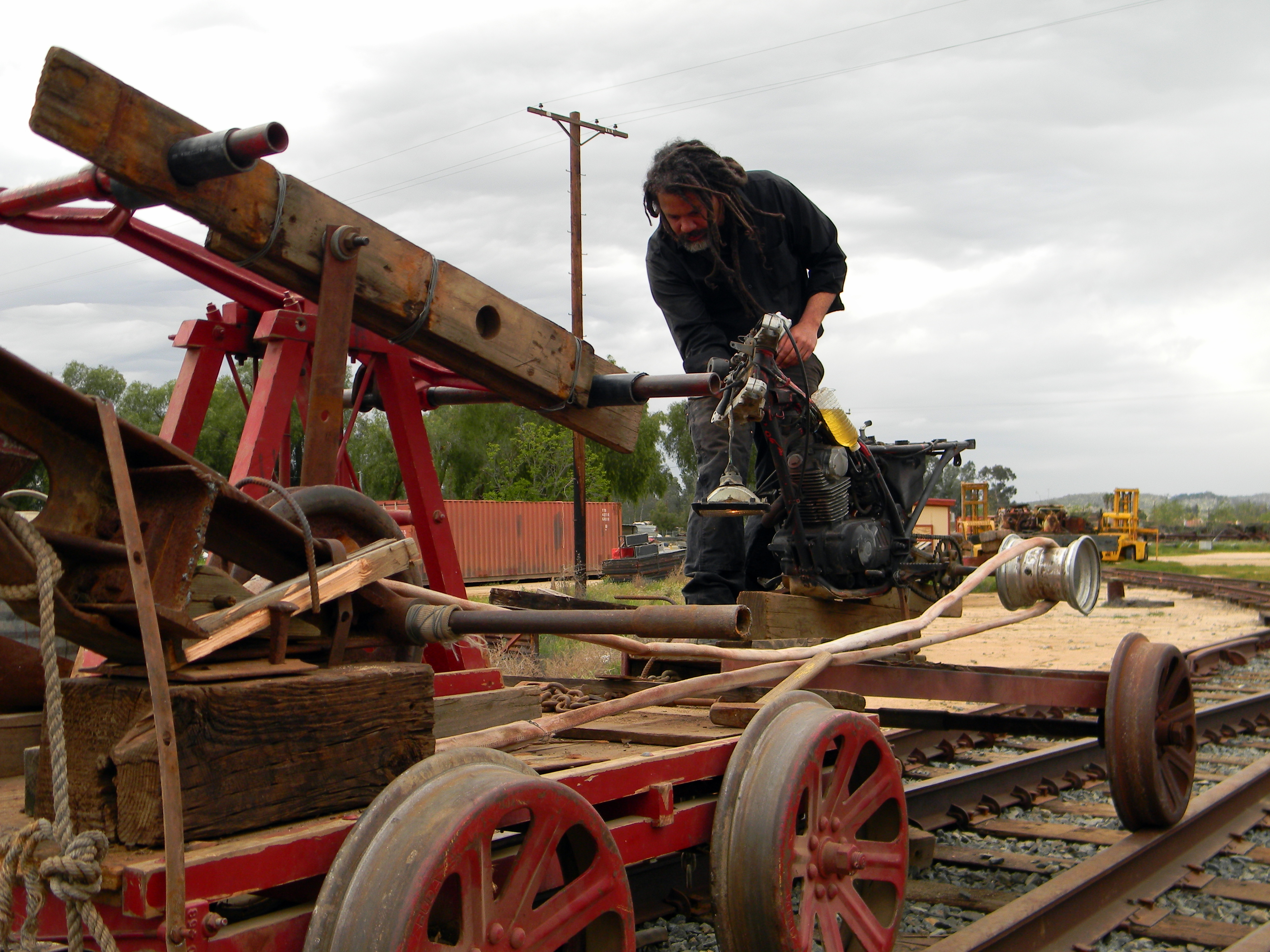
- Genre: Documentary; Science
- Created by: Nathaniel Grouille; Korelan Cone
- Starring: Chris Hackett
- Country of origin: United States
- Original language: English
- No. of seasons: 1
- No. of episodes: 9

Production
- Running time: 30 minutes

Original release
- Network: Science Channel
- Release: August 18, 2011

Stuck with Hackett is a television show created and produced by Silver Machine for the Science Channel. It was commissioned as a pilot in 2010 and picked up as a nine-part series which began airing on August 18, 2011. It follows the trials and tribulations of artist Chris Hackett, founder of the Madagascar Institute, as he turns everyday trash into new and unexpected machines or mechanisms.

== Format ==
Each episode takes Hackett to a different abandoned location, including a rail yard, a munitions factory, and a log cabin. After deciding what he’s going to create to make his stay in the abandoned location more enjoyable, Hackett begins to collect various pieces of "obtainium", a term he uses for anything from trash to scrap metal to large pieces of machinery that are being repurposed. Hackett then proceeds to construct the desired completed object, with "off camera support" of his production team.

== Chris Hackett ==
Chris Hackett is an artist who grew up in New York. He creates large, interactive art installations. He is the founder of The Madagascar Institute, an artist cooperative space based in Brooklyn, New York.

== Episodes ==
No. in series	Title	Original release date
1	"Leaving on a Jet Train"	August 18, 2011
Hackett starts with an abandoned rail yard, and fabricates a locomotive of sorts.
2	"Laundromat of the Gods"	August 25, 2011
To clean his junkyard-contaminated clothes, Hackett resurrects a washer and dryer from parts and an automobile, building a welder in the process.
3	"Hospital of Horror"	September 1, 2011
In an abandoned medical facility, Hackett fabricates several types of hazardous artificial illumination.
4	"The Suburbs Are for Suckers"	September 8, 2011
Hackett constructs several types of power sources, in order to run modern electric conveniences in an abandoned desert home off the grid.
5	"Dirt Boat"	September 15, 2011
Hackett builds a vehicle from parts at an abandoned aviation junkyard.
6	"Really Freaking Fast Food"	September 22, 2011
To prepare meals from food found in dumpsters, Hackett creates a kitchen in a machine shop.
7	"Do Bears...?"	September 29, 2011
Hackett builds a shower, a pump, and a water heater from found items in an abandoned RV camp.
8	"Hackestivus!"	October 6, 2011
Hackett invents a holiday at an abandoned munitions factory with devices, rockets and fireworks to celebrate.
9	"Hot Tub on Ice"	October 13, 2011
Hackett attempts to devise a hot tub built with snow, powered by the sun.

== Reception ==
New York Times reviewer Neil Genzlinger wrote that Hackett's "can-do spirit is admirable. This is the guy I want to be lost with when the [apocalypse] comes..." In Wired, Dave Giancaspro recommended the series to viewers. Common Sense Media used "cool", "exceptional", "clear" and "compelling" to describe the science lessons embodied in the show, while cautioning that kids should be taught not to follow Hackett's example of tearing apart his environment, and occasionally blowing things up; the non-profit group rated the show as appropriate for ages 9 and up. In Media Life Magazine, Tom Conroy found the show "fun, engrossing and informative", except for Hackett's overuse of the word "obtainium." Of the pilot episode, Conroy wondered if an abandoned rail yard would have a working pump car, a working gasoline engine, and nearby fueled-up lawn mowers, and wondered how much "support" Hackett received during the project. He found what Hackett achieved to be "amazing" nonetheless, and beyond the show's educational content, declared Hackett "fun".
