= Camp Nowhere =

1994 film by Jonathan Prince

- Theatrical release poster
- Directed by: Jonathan Prince
- Written by: Andrew Kurtzman; Eliot Wald
- Produced by: Michael Peyser
- Starring: Christopher Lloyd; Jonathan Jackson; Wendy Makkena; M. Emmet Walsh
- Cinematography: Sandi Sissel
- Edited by: Jon Poll
- Music by: David Lawrence
- Production company: Hollywood Pictures
- Distributed by: Buena Vista Pictures Distribution
- Release date: August 26, 1994
- Running time: 96 minutes
- Country: United States
- Language: English
- Box office: $10,471,613 (US)

Camp Nowhere is a 1994 American adventure comedy film directed by Jonathan Prince, written by Andrew Kurtzman and Eliot Wald, and stars Christopher Lloyd, Jonathan Jackson in his film debut, Wendy Makkena and M. Emmet Walsh. Jessica Alba also appears in her film debut.

== Plot ==
12-year-old Morris "Mud" Himmel has a problem: his parents want to send him away to a summer computer camp. He hates going to summer camp and will do anything to get out of it. Talking to his friends, he realizes that they are all facing the same sentence of going to a boring summer camp. Together, they hatch a plan to create their own summer camp with no parents, no counselors, and no rules. Word gets out and other kids soon want to join the made-up summer camp. Mud decides to blackmail former drama teacher Dennis Van Welker into helping; he had bought an AMC Gremlin and failed to make most of the payments and is being pursued by soon-to-retire collector T.R. Polk, and agrees to help them in return for $1,000 and after they threaten to turn him in if he does not help.

With Dennis' help, the kids trick all the parents into sending them to the camp, and then rent an old campground (that used to be a hippie commune back in the 1960s and '70s) with a cabin on a lake. Some parents believe it is a computer camp, while others believe it is a fat camp, military camp, or an acting camp. The kids use the money their parents had paid for camp to buy toys and food. After a little while, they get bored and wonder if they should just return home. Mud goes to Dennis for help, and with a bribe, he soon finds ways to keep things interesting and help them continue to have fun.

Eventually, the parents want to come visit their kids despite being told that there are no parents' days. Mud makes a plan to trick them and, along with his friends, they keep the camp concealed. In a matter of hours, they fix it up and set up different scenarios representing the different camps (fat camp, computer camp, military camp, etc.) Their plan works and the parents do not suspect a thing. T.R. Polk then meets a state trooper who was also seeking Dennis, and they find their way into the camp and catch him. The police are called and Mud finds Dennis running away from the authorities. Mud is confronted by the police and protects Dennis from them, but soon after Dennis turns himself in. Mud confesses and explains that the whole thing was his idea, and uses the rest of the money to settle Dennis' debt with T.R. Polk, who will retire with a perfect record. The other kids in a show of solidarity also claim responsibility and therefore all the parents refuse to press charges. Dennis gets off the hook and the kids leave for home, having had the greatest summer of their lives. Mostly Mud is punished by his parents because of this scheme.

== Cast ==
- Jonathan Jackson as Morris "Mud" Himmel
- Christopher Lloyd as Dennis Van Welker
- Andrew Keegan as Zack Dell
- Marnette Patterson as Trish Prescott
- Melody Kay as Gaby Nowicki
- Wendy Makkena as Dr. Celeste Dunbar
- Thomas F. Wilson as Lt. Eliot Hendricks
- M. Emmet Walsh as T.R. Polk
- Joshua G. Mayweather as Walter
- Hillary Tuck as Betty Stoller
- Devin Neil Oatway as Tim
- Allison Mack as Heather
- Nathan Cavaleri as Steve
- Jessica Alba as Gail
- Peter Scolari as Donald Himmel
- Michael Zorek as Chez Cheez Guy
- Ian Christopher Scott as Warren
- Heather DeLoach as Eileen
- Paige Andree as Jill
- Leah Theresa Hanner as Debbie
- Mooky Arizona as Arnold Spiegel
- Kazz Wingate IV as Pete
- Kellen McLaughlin as J.D.
- Brian Wagner as Lenny
- Nicolas Friedman as Ricky
- Alyssa Poblador as Nicole
- Krystle and Tiffany Mataras as Amber and Ashley
- Romy Windsor as Nancy Himmel
- Ray Baker as Norris Prescott
- Kate Mulgrew as Rachel Prescott
- John Putch as Neil Garbus
- Burgess Meredith as Feln
- Maryedith Burrell as Gwen Nowicki
- Genie Francis as Mrs. Spiegel
- Jonathan Frakes as Bob Spiegel
- Peter Onorati as Karl Dell

== Reception ==
On Rotten Tomatoes the film has a score of 17% based on reviews from 12 critics. Audiences surveyed by CinemaScore gave the film a grade "B" on scale of A to F.

Janet Maslin of The New York Times gave the film a positive review. Maslin thought it could have been predictable and awful but that it had "a funny screenplay", "good-humored direction", and "a nice young cast" who "have television experience, and they bring a sturdy, no-frills professionalism to their roles". Hal Hinson of The Washington Post gave it a positive review, and wrote: "Instead of the usual coming-of-age coarseness, this celebration of kid power is a rather tame affair. It's sweet, likable and even vaguely hip."

Brian Baker of the Austin Chronicle gave it 2 out of 5, and was critical of the plot. He says "It depends mostly on Lloyd's crazy characters to hold the narrative together and that works for a brief moment early in the film" and that "No kid is going to buy into a movie that revolves around a geek who isn't a geek and a fat girl who isn't fat." Chris Hicks of the Deseret News wrote: "The youngsters in the cast are appealing and the film is amusing, though it never quite builds up the head of steam it seems to be aiming for."

Bob Ross of The Tampa Tribune placed it on his list of the worst films of 1994, while advising his readers to "watch it on cable for Christopher Lloyd's cheerfully subversive performance as an unrepentant ex-hippie."

== Home media ==
Camp Nowhere was released on VHS on June 6, 1995, and released on DVD August 5, 2003. Mill Creek Entertainment released the film on Blu-ray on October 11, 2011. Kino Lorber released the film on DVD and Blu-ray April 17, 2018.
