= Chris Hackett (artist) =

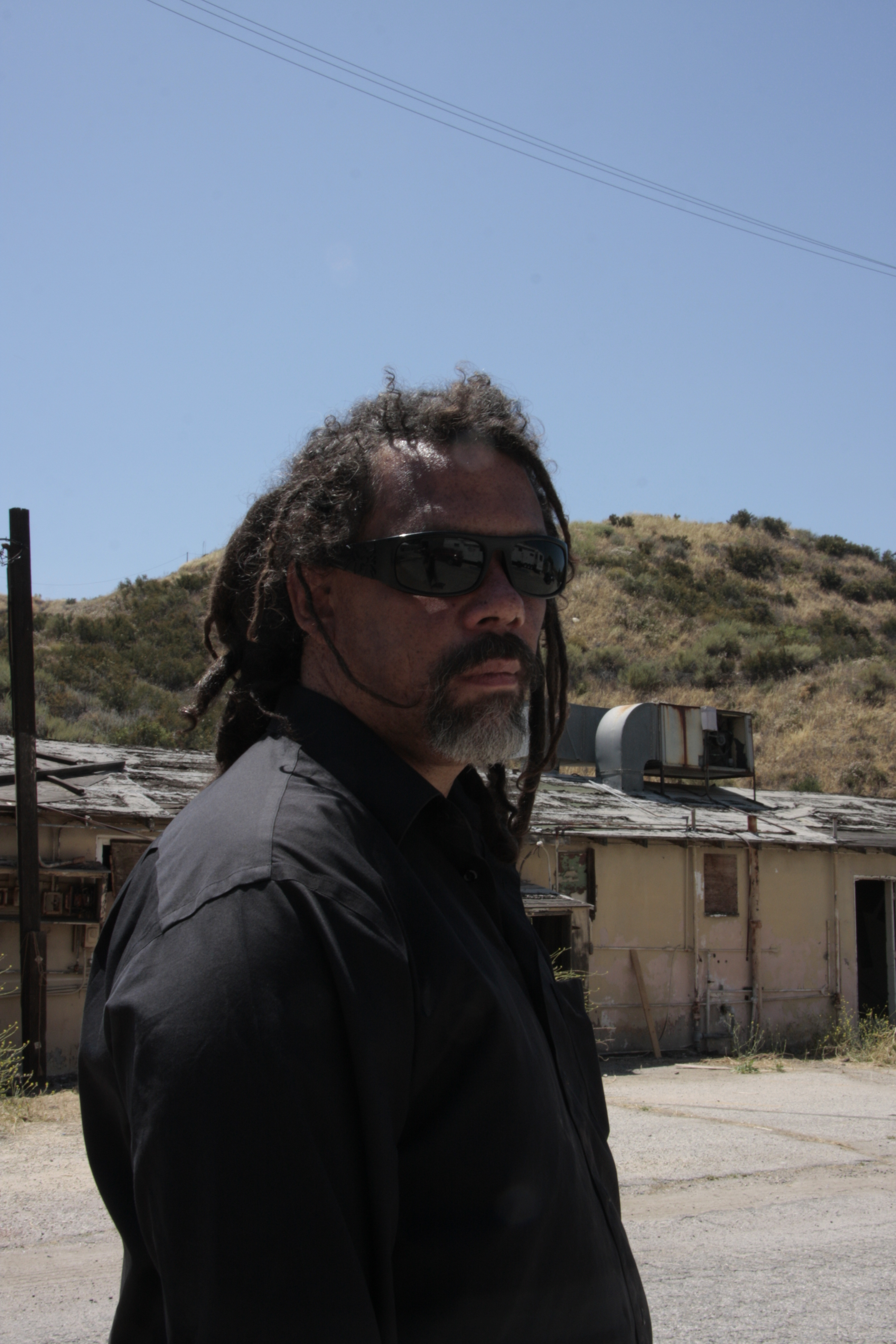
- Other name: Hackett
- Occupations: Artist, television presenter, writer, fabricator, instructor

Chris Hackett (born April 15, 1972), is an artist, television presenter, writer, fabricator and instructor. He is a co-founder of the Madagascar Institute, an art combine located in Brooklyn, NY, contributing editor for Popular Science magazine, and was the host of the Science Channel's television show Stuck with Hackett. A 2012 article in The New York Times entitled "Building a better apocalypse" described him as "something like a fabricator in chief for the Kings County D.I.Y. art set." In 2017 Hackett was featured as one of ten contestants on the TV show MythBusters: The Search which aired in early 2017 on the Science Channel.

== The Madagascar Institute ==
In 1998, Chris Hackett founded the Madagascar Institute with colleagues Ryan O'Connor and Eric Singer. The Madagascar Institute is an affiliation of artists headquartered near the Gowanus Canal in Brooklyn, New York.

== Television and Film ==
=== Junkyard Wars ===
Between 2002 and 2004, Hackett appeared on TLC's Junkyard Wars. The show, which was the American version of the UK show Scrapheap Challenge, gave teams 12 hours to gather materials from a junkyard, then use the materials to modify their vehicles for a race. Hackett acted as the Red Team Captain.

=== B.I.K.E. ===
In 2005, Hackett appeared in the documentary B.I.K.E. The film was directed by Anthony Howard and Jacob Septimus. They spent over two years following an underground bike club known as the Black Label Bicycle Club to their meetings, parties, gatherings of the tribes in Amsterdam and Minneapolis, and the protests of the 2004 Republican National Convention, and filmed it all.

=== Breaking Point ===
In early 2010, he appeared on the Discovery Channel Canada show Breaking Point alongside Jonathan Tippett. The show premiered Monday, January 18, 2010, and was six episodes long. In each episode, the guys would investigate the limits of large scale everyday objects, such as armored limos, lobster boats, fuel tankers, buses, and more. Hackett and Tippett would conduct extreme tests on one of these objects until they found its breaking point. Then they would come up with ways to make the object safer and stronger.

=== Stuck with Hackett ===
Hackett was the star and host of the Science Channel's Stuck with Hackett. The show premiered on August 18, 2011 as a nine part series, and could be watched on Thursdays at 10:30 PM. Each episode took place in a different abandoned location (rail yard, log cabin, grocery store dumpster, abandoned hospital, and so on). Hackett would turn the everyday trash, or "obtainium", as he calls it, that was left at the location into unexpected, functioning machines or mechanisms.

=== Mythbusters: The Search ===
In January 2017 Hackett returned to the Science Channel to star in MythBusters: The Search. Hackett was one of ten competitors who vied for a spot to be one of the next "Mythbusters". In episode 2 Hackett won the MVP award for his performance on the green team's paint-a-room-with-an-explosion device and he was eliminated after episode 6.

== Author Credits ==
=== Popular Science ===
Hackett writes a column for Popular Science in which he tackles problems with DIY engineering.

=== The Big Book of Maker Skills ===
Hackett's first book, The Big Book of Maker Skills: 334 Tools & Techniques for Building Great Tech Projects, was published by Weldon Owen in November 2014.
