= Rachel Pizzolato =

American actress, model and influencer (born 2004)

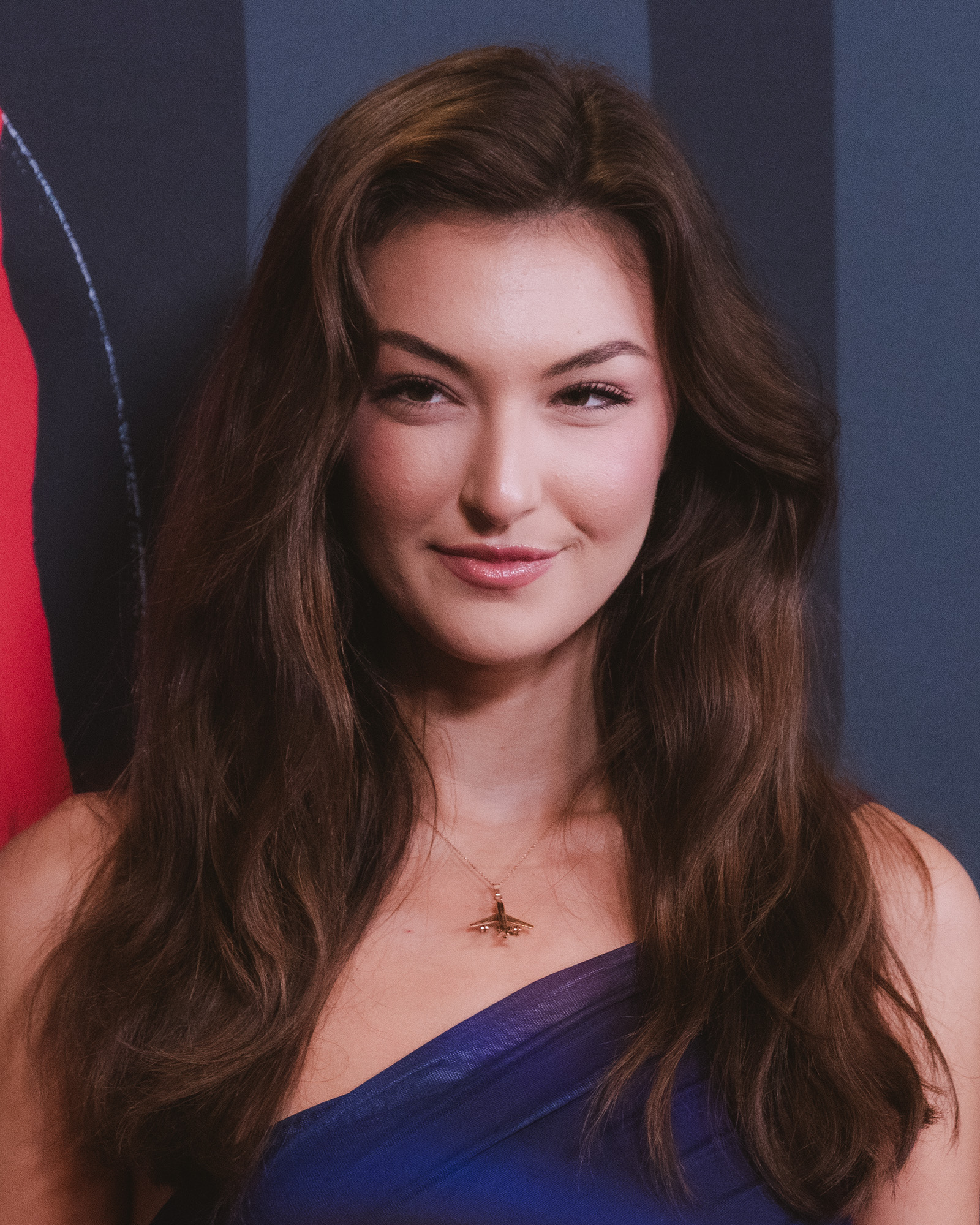
- Pizzolato in 2026
- Born: January 19, 2004 (age 22); Metairie, Louisiana, U.S.
- Education: John Curtis Christian School
- Alma mater: Louisiana State University Shreveport
- Occupations: Model; social media personality; actress; inventor
- Notable work: MythBusters Jr.

Rachel Pizzolato (born January 19, 2004), is an American social media personality and model.

In 2017, Pizzolato, while an eighth-grader attending John Curtis Christian School, was the winner of the Grand Sweepstakes Award in the Junior Division of the Greater New Orleans Science and Engineering Fair. She is known for appearing on the television series MythBusters Jr. in 2019. She also collaborates with Las Vegas magician Murray SawChuck to produce a series of social media videos in which they perform close-up magic, balloon tricks, and stage illusions such as 'Sawing a woman in half' with Pizzolato in the role of the willing assistant.

In 2025 she co-starred in the horror film Round the Decay.

== Inventions ==
Her invention "Incorporating an Articulating Facemask Into a Multi-Directional Self-Centering Linear Damping Football Helmet System" garnered her third place in the 2022 International Science and Engineering Fair.
