= Loophole (firearm) =

Architectural aperture for firing guns through

A loophole is a protected small opening, which allows a firearm to be aimed and discharged, while providing cover and concealment for the rifleman. To prevent detection, the rifle's muzzle should not protrude through the loophole, particularly at night to hide the muzzle flash.

== Arrowslit ==
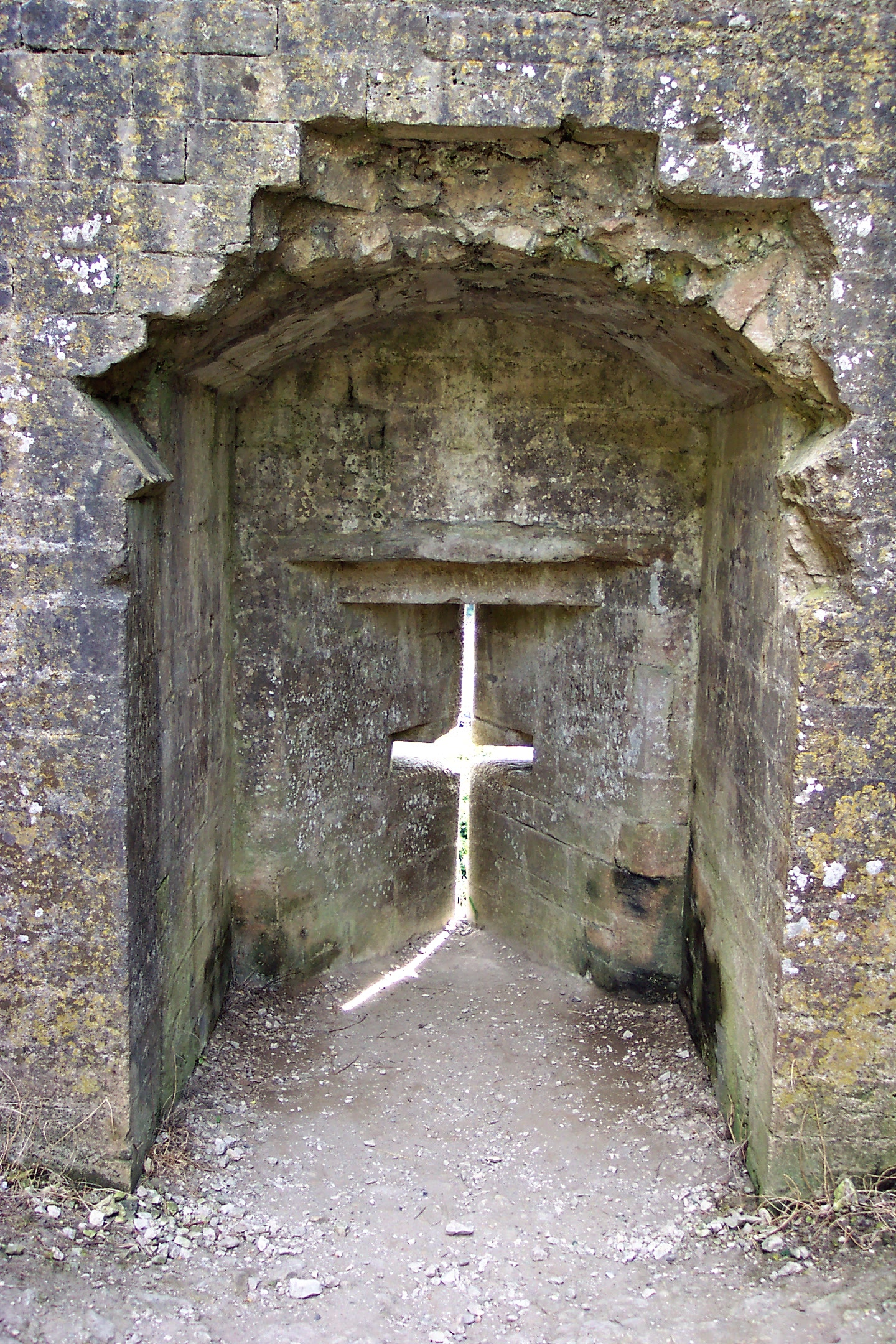
Arrowslit

The precursor to the loophole for firearms was the arrowslit, which is a narrow aperture in a fortification for an archer to launch arrows or an arbalist to launch crossbow bolts. The earliest use of the arrowslit was alleged to have been by Archimedes during the siege of Syracuse in 214–212 BC. Arrowslits were used in ancient Greek warfare and by the military of ancient Rome. There was a reintroduction of arrowslits during the medieval warfare period at Dover Castle and Framlingham Castle in England and by Richard the Lionheart at Château Gaillard in France.

== First World War ==
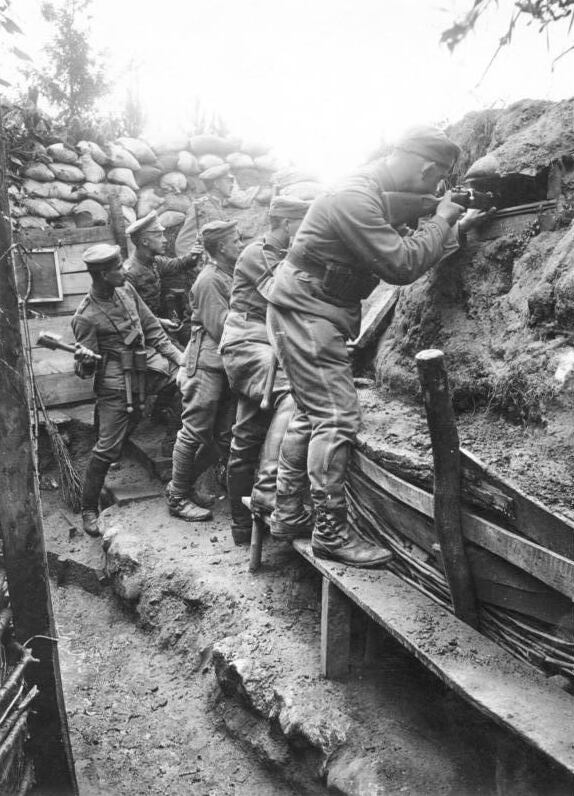
German rifleman shooting through a loophole

During the First World War, the static movement of trench warfare and a need for protection from snipers created a requirement for loopholes both for discharging firearms and for observation. Often a steel plate was used with a "key hole", which had a rotating piece to cover the loophole when not in use.

Major Hesketh Hesketh-Prichard of the Canadian Expeditionary Force and a trainer of snipers, wrote about the use of loopholes in his book, Sniping in France: Winning the Sniping War in the Trenches:

I am also keen on teaching our fellows to open loopholes sanely. I usually lie in front watching, and it is rarely that, if I shot straight, I should not be able to kill or wound nine of every ten men who open them. Loopholes should, of course, be opened from the side, and a cap badge exposed before they are looked through. If the German does not fire for 75 seconds, one may conclude that it is fairly safe. These little simple-sounding precautions can save so many lives.

— Major Hesketh Hesketh-Prichard

One counter-sniper tactic to overcome steel plate loopholes was to wait for a sniper to open the key hole and then fire a large calibre firearm, such as an anti-materiel rifle, to penetrate through the steel plate and eliminate the sniper.

== Contemporary use ==
Loopholes remain relevant in modern urban combat typically in walls – these may be already-existing holes, or purpose-made and fortified with sandbags or similar. Loopholes should be constructed in a seemingly random fashion at varying heights, and include a number of decoy holes in order to avoid drawing fire towards a single obvious hole.

== See also ==
- Embrasure, a larger opening in a fortification, often for artillery
- Mouse-holing, combat tactic
- Periscope rifle
- Turret (architecture) and Gun turret
- Technology during World War I
