= Round the Decay =

- Theatrical release poster
- Directed by: Adam Newman
- Written by: Adam Newman
- Produced by: Jon Balanoff; Adam McDonald; Adam Newman; Jay Voishnis; Topher Hansson
- Starring: Phil Duran; Victoria Mirrer
- Cinematography: Mike Magilnick
- Edited by: Topher Hansson
- Production company: Dreamscape Productions
- Distributed by: Dreamscape Productions
- Release date: January 31, 2025
- Running time: 105 minutes
- Country: United States
- Language: English

Round the Decay is a 2025 American independent horror film directed, written, and produced by Adam Newman. The film follows a young woman who returns to the site of her broken engagement, Newport's Valley, a sleepy tourist town with an all-consuming secret.

The film was released in the United States on January 31, 2025.

== Plot ==
The film opens in a haunting flashback to the late 1600s, where Whelan Newport and a band of colonial settlers arrive in what is now Newport’s Valley, New Hampshire. The settlers, finding the land unforgiving and haunted by resistance from local indigenous people, are depicted turning to a desperate act. Whelan, driven by power and fear, leads a dark ritual in which his own wife is sacrificed to an ancient spirit known as the Wrexsoul, an entity that promises dominion over the land in exchange for blood. The spirit manifests as a grotesque humanoid with hollow, dripping eyes and mimetic powers. It exterminates the native population in a swift, horrifying sequence. The valley is cursed from that moment on, soaked in guilt, secrecy, and blood.

Jump to the present day. Kenzie Rhodes, a young woman in her early 30s, returns to the remote town of Newport’s Valley after years away. Two years prior, her fiancé, Zack, disappeared mysteriously during a hiking trip through the region’s ancient forest. The town offered no answers, and Kenzie left in grief. Now, drawn back by both guilt and unresolved emotions, she checks into the recently reopened Barn Owl Inn, an old lodge now run by Bart Blakewell, a hopeful outsider who recently moved in to revive the decaying tourist economy.

Kenzie’s presence stirs quiet tension among the locals. She notices the town feels trapped in time, few new businesses, sparse young people, and an air of collective denial. She reunites with Roz Jackson, an old school friend who now bartends at the only remaining pub. Roz tries to warn Kenzie to keep her distance from the woods, suggesting that not everything that happened to Zack was natural. Meanwhile, a group of four hikers, Aida Kazarian, her boyfriend Trevor, and two college friends arrive at the inn and decide to explore a cave system known as Widow’s Gap, said to have been closed for years.

Deep in the cave, the hikers discover crude colonial symbols etched into the rock and what appears to be a mummified corpse hanging upside down with its mouth sewn shut. Disturbed, they leave but it's already too late. The Wrexsoul has reawakened. That night, Trevor is found torn apart in his tent, and Aida flees back to town, frantic and bloodied.

Sheriff Denton, a grizzled man worn down by years of buried incidents, insists Trevor’s death was a bear attack. But Munroe, a mysterious man who arrives shortly after, offers a very different interpretation. He’s a monster hunter of sorts, with deep knowledge of regional folklore and a past connection to similar killings in nearby towns. He meets with Kenzie in secret, explaining that her fiancé’s disappearance was part of a long pattern, one the town’s elite, especially those descended from Whelan Newport, have kept buried.

Kenzie’s dreams become increasingly vivid. She sees the Wrexsoul mimicking Zack's voice, walking with his limp, calling her name in distorted tones. She begins to unravel, unsure if her memories are real or planted. Meanwhile, Bart, the innkeeper, finds strange colonial writings under the floorboards of the lodge written in blood and spelling out names of the town’s original sacrificial victims.

The deaths continue. Roz is attacked and barely survives. One of the town’s oldest residents, Agnes Lawley, confesses to Kenzie that the valley is “sick with the blood of betrayal.” She recounts how the town was built on layered sacrifice, every few decades, the Wrexsoul returns, drawn to grief, guilt, and human blood. Some townsfolk, she claims, secretly help it, believing in an ancient covenant that must be upheld.

Kenzie, Aida, Bart, and Munroe form an uneasy alliance. Together, they investigate the ruins of the Newport family homestead. There, Munroe reveals that the Wrexsoul cannot be killed in a conventional sense, it is a binding of spirit and flesh, and only another “willing soul” can trap it in a new tomb. They theorize that the entity is a psychic sponge, feeding on unprocessed trauma and replicating the pain of its victims.

The group retreat to the cave, luring the Wrexsoul with a ritualistic recitation from Whelan’s own journal. Bart sacrifices himself to give the others time to seal the cave entrance with explosives. In a bloody battle inside the dark, pulsing caverns, Munroe is gravely wounded, and Aida is briefly possessed by the Wrexsoul, speaking in Zack's voice. Kenzie nearly breaks, but ultimately drives a spike through Aida’s hand to break the trance.

As the Wrexsoul rears to strike, Kenzie offers herself to it, reciting the original covenant in reverse using her own name in place of Whelan’s wife. This disrupts the creature’s form, and it begins to disintegrate in a whirlwind of shrieks and ash. A cave-in traps it beneath rubble as dawn breaks. Roz and Kenzie stand by the edge of the forest, watching as smoke rises from the valley. The sheriff is gone. Munroe is dead. Aida leaves town quietly, broken. The Inn is boarded up. But the land seems... quieter.

The final scene, set weeks later, a group of children exploring the ruins of an old barn hear faint whispers calling one of their names, spoken in a voice that sounds eerily familiar.

== Cast ==
- Victoria Mirrer as Kenzie Rhodes
- Damian Maffei as Munroe
- Sienna Hubert-Ross as Rosalyn 'Roz' Jackson
- Cary Hite as Bart Blakewell
- Alexis Safoyan as Aida Kazarian
- Rachel Pizzolato as The Wrexsoul
- Phil Duran as Larold Hayes

== Production ==
Filming took place in New Hampshire.

== Release ==
The film was released theatrically in the United States on January 31, 2025.
