= Peter Rees (producer) =

American film producer

- Born: California, U.S.
- Occupation: Television producer
- Known for: MythBusters

Peter Rees is a film and television writer, director, and producer. He created and developed the concept—and was the executive producer of—the television series MythBusters. Rees won the 1993 Charles Heidsieck International Travel Challenge, and with his race partner, Peter Coleman, wrote and directed a documentary about the event, In the Footsteps of Champagne Charlie.
