= Idra (disambiguation) =

The Idra is a Kabbalistic work included in printings of the Zohar.

Idra or IDRA may also refer to:

== People ==
- IdrA (Greg "Idra" Field), StarCraft player
- Idra Novey, American novelist, poet, and translator

== Other uses ==
- Insanity Defense Reform Act, a US law
- International Design Resource Awards Competition, for sustainable product design
- IDRA-21, a drug
- Idra Group, manufacturer of the Giga Press
