= Bisi Ezerioha =

American racing driver (born 1972)

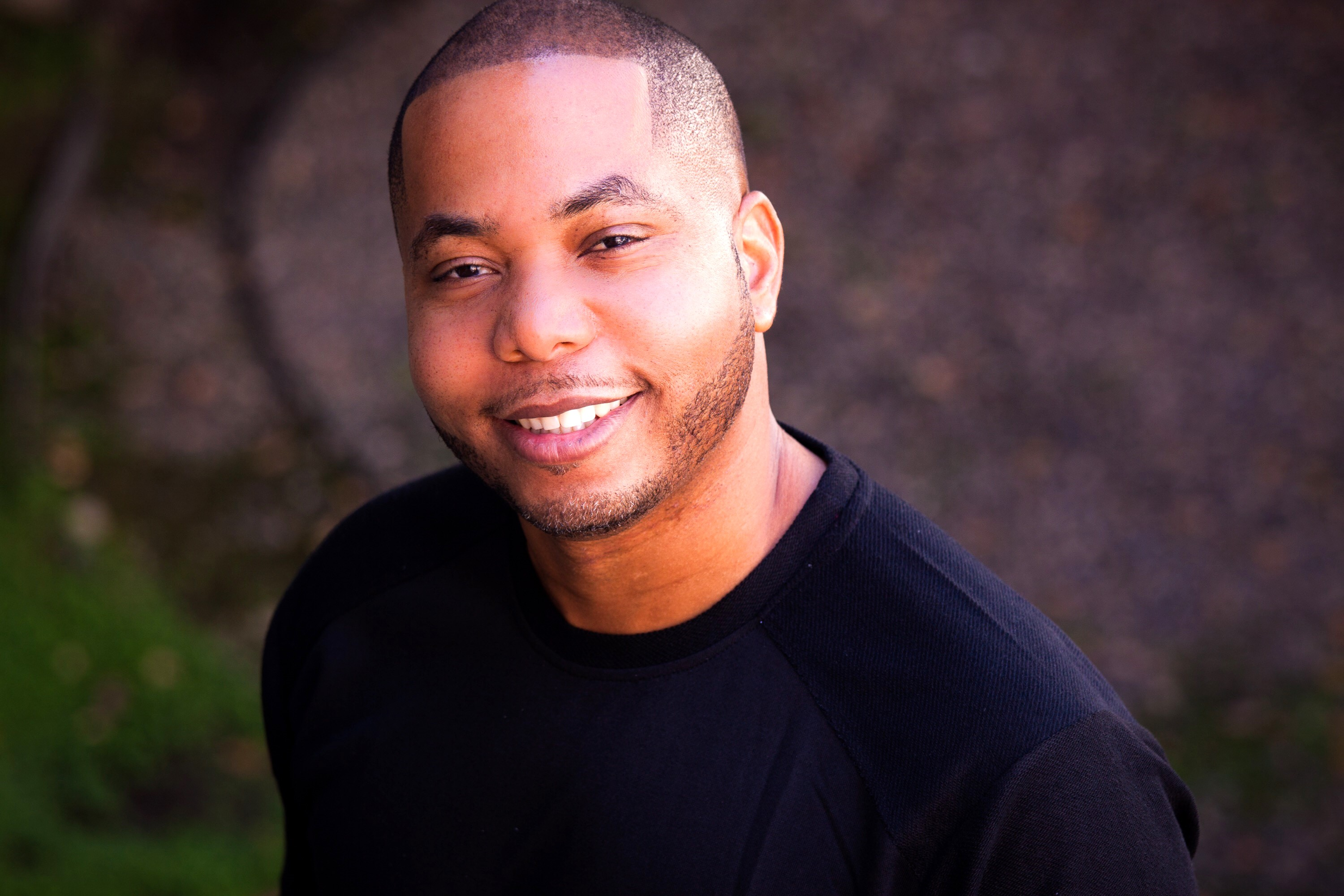
- Born: Ndubisi Ezerioha; January 6, 1972 (age 54)
- Education: California State University, Long Beach
- Occupations: Engineer and Entrepreneur
- Title: CEO and Chief Engineer at Bisimoto

Ndubisi "Bisi" Ezerioha (born January 6, 1972) is a Nigerian-American engineer, professional race car driver, entrepreneur and engine builder. He is the current CEO and Chief Engineer for Bisimoto Engineering. Ezerioha is involved in import drag racing, and pilots a 2006 Honda Insight in the pro stock ranks of IDRA, IDRC and CMI series. A chemical engineer by training, and entering university at the age of 15, he was a pharmaceutical researcher for years before he decided to branch off. His automotive creations have appeared in numerous films, television shows, toys and video games.

== Early life ==
Ezerioha was born on January 6, 1972, the son of Nigerian parents Dr. Emesia Ezerioha, an industrialist and Chinyere Ezerioha, a biochemist, researcher and cosmetics pioneer. Ezerioha's father holds bachelor's degrees in earth sciences and geology from California State University, Los Angeles, master's degrees in earth systems science as well as economics and a Ph.D. in international marketing. Hailing from a scientific oriented family background, Bisi developed a keen interest and showed aptitude in chemistry while in secondary school in Nigeria. His curiosity about what powered automobiles and factory machinery led to his enrolment into Anambra State University of Technology, Anambra, Nigeria at the age of 15 to study petrochemical engineering.

== Education ==
After a year of study in Nigeria, West Africa, Ezerioha transferred to Cerritos College and graduated with an honors associate degree in applied and natural sciences, before proceeding to California State University, Long Beach where he obtained bachelor's and master's degrees in Chemical Engineering and Engineering Management respectively.

== Personal life ==
Ezerioha married Hedi Kim in May 2011, and they have two children, together. He filed for divorce to Kim in June 2021, which is now final.

== Career ==
=== Pharmaceuticals ===
Upon graduation, Ezerioha joined the research division of a pharmaceutical company, eventually switching to sales and quickly rising through the management ranks. After over a decade in various areas of pharmaceutical research, marketing and sales he desired to utilize his skills in the design and manufacturing high-performance parts for motor sports. During this time, he gained some recognition in the racing scene for building and driving the fastest carbureted front wheel drive vehicle in the world.

=== Motorsports ===
In 1994, Ezerioha founded Bisimoto Engineering to further test and bring his engine designs to life. Ezerioha's early accolades include building the most powerful naturally-aspirated SOHC Honda engines involving the D16A6, D15B7, F22A, F18A and D16Z6 platforms. He aimed to demonstrate that even less popular engines could reliably produce significant amounts of power.

Bisimoto eventually expanded into the turbocharged market with a 700 hp 1.6L SOHC powered Honda civic wagon, 533 hp LEA1 1.5L CR-Z hybrid, a 1000+hp Honda Odyssey, a 602whp Hyundai Elantra GT, and many high HP twin-turbocharged Porsche 911s.

Ezerioha has played a leading role in the development of the firm, which has gained international recognition in the field of engine design and tuning. His work has been featured in publications including DSport, Super Street, Turbo Magazine, Sport Compact Car, Racecar Engineering, Import Tuner, Total 911, Fast Car, and Full Throttle.

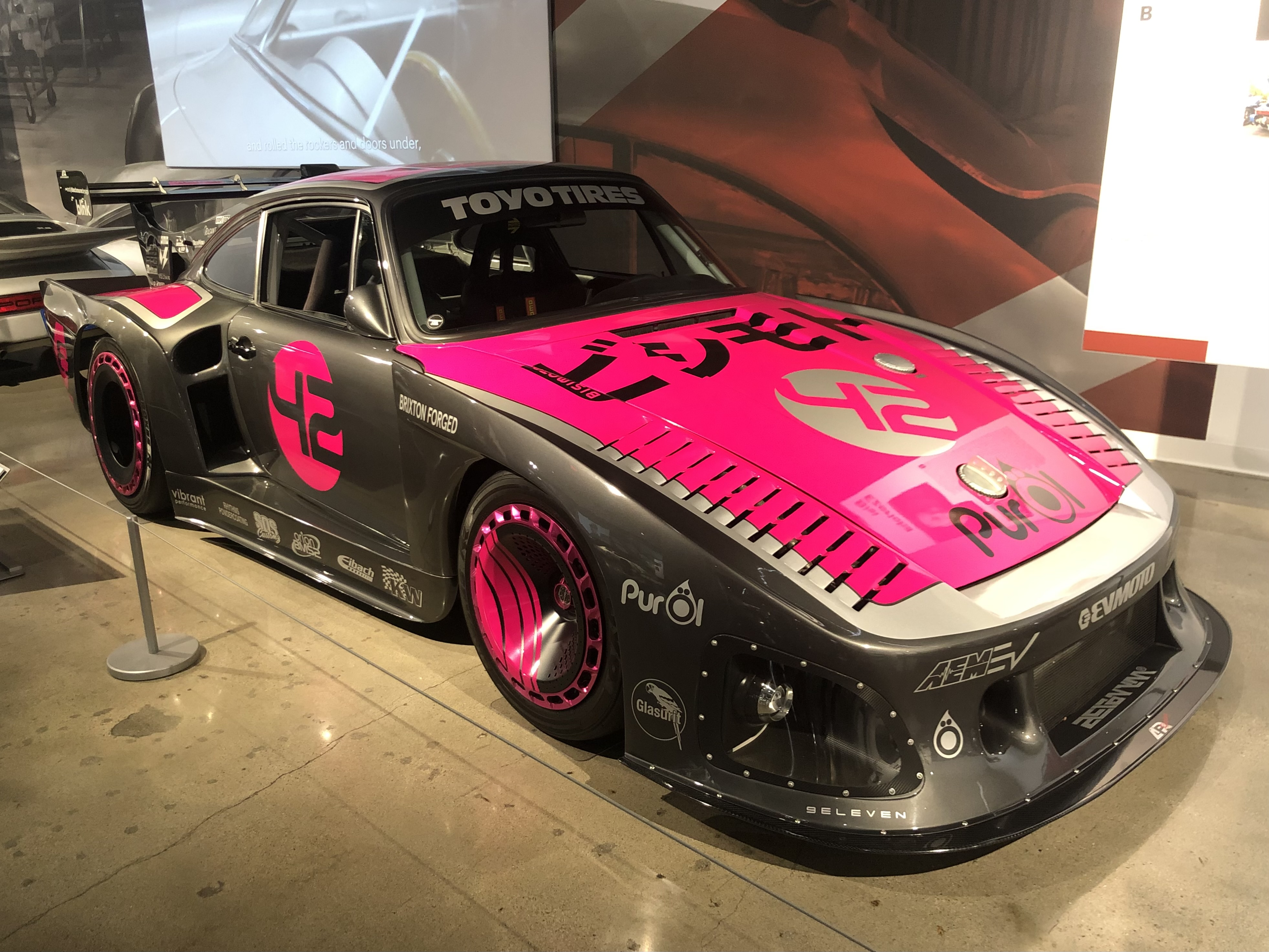
1984 Porsche 935 “K3V” by Bisimoto on display in the Petersen Automotive Museum

In 2019, Ezerioha built the "935 K3V", the company's first electric conversion project. The project is based on a 1984 911 chassis, with a custom Porsche 935 style body built using original Kremer 935 molds, and is powered by the electric motor from a Tesla Model S, producing 636 hp. He followed up with a longtail Moby Dick inspired 935 known as the Moby X, also in EV format, with 640 hp. Both were exhibited in the Petersen Automotive Museum, showcased in the "We Are Porsche" exhibit (2023-2024), commemorating Porsche's 75 years as a brand. The two cars were the only electric vehicles in the display.

=== Motor MythBusters ===
Ezerioha was later chosen to host Motortrend's automobile-themed spinoff of MythBusters, titled Motor MythBusters. He was also joined by Faye Hadley and MythBusters veteran Tory Belleci in testing tall tales and stories related to automobiles.

== Achievements ==
=== Drag Racing ===
2016: One event win

2015: Three event wins, World's quickest n/a FWD Unibody 1/8th mile time at 5.87 seconds

2014: One event win; World's fastest Hyundai run at 178 mph; World's fastest 1976 Porsche 930 at 156 mph

2013: Two event wins, Unibody FWD naturally aspirated world record with 9.20 at 152 mph

2011: Two event wins

2010: One event win

2009: Five event wins; Set the world record of the first naturally aspirated FWD to run 150 mph in a quarter mile; Broke the world record for quickest naturally aspirated FWD with a 9.36 quarter mile elapsed time

2008: Six event wins

2007: Four Event wins; International Drag Racing Association (IDRA) Pro stock champion

2006: Eight event wins; World's 1st confirmed 9 second n/a pass on gasoline (9.97 at 135 mph) First non-VTEC Honda all motor to run 9s in the quarter mile; International Drag Racing Circuit (IDRC) Pro Stock Champion

2005: One event win

2004: Three event wins

2003: Six event wins; International Drag Racing Circuit (IDRC) all motor world champion; Voted “World’s favorite pro stock racer” by the International Drag Racing Association (IDRA)

2002: First non-VTEC Honda all motor to run 10s in the quarter mile (10.93@124.7 mph); World's quickest SOHC n/a Honda at 10.72 elapsed time (1.5L)

2001: One event win

2000: One event win

1999: First non-VTEC Honda all motor to run 11s in the quarter mile. World's fastest and quickest n/a 1.5L

1998: World's Fastest Naturally Aspirated Street SOHC (12.64); one event win

1997: One event win

=== Engine Design, Tuning and Modifications ===
2017 SEMA: 83mpg Ioniq, for Hyundai Motors America; 700 hp Dodge Viper, for NGK Spark Plugs; 58mpg Ioniq for Toyo Tires; 526 hp Center seat Porsche for Dynapack Dynamometers PTY New Zealand

2016 SEMA: 400 hp RWB Porsche for SpeedHunters UK; 1080 hp Turbo RWD conversion Santa Fe, for Hyundai Motors America; 901 hp Ford Mustang for NGK Spark Plugs; 500 hp Porsche 911 twin turbo for Quaife Engineering UK

2016 CES show: 701 hp Hyundai Tucson Turbo for Harman Karden/JBL

2015 SEMA: 400 hp RWB Porsche for Need for speed Electronic Arts Video game company; 250 hp HR-V for American Honda; 700 hp Turbo Tucson, for Hyundai Motors America; 900 hp Mustang for Ford Motor Company; 500 hp Turbo RWB Porsche 911 for Toyo Tires

2014 SEMA: 400 hp and spec racing FITs, for American Honda; 888 hp Turbo Sonata for Hyundai Motor America; 500 hp Porsche 911 Turbo for PurOl Lubricants; 481 hp Twin turbo Porsche Cayman, for NGK Spark Plugs; 609 hp Twin Turbo Porsche for Spec Clutch .

2013 SEMA: 1029 hp Turbo Odyssey Minivan, for American Honda; 1022 hp twin turbo Genesis coupe, for Hyundai Motor America; 400 hp single turbo Porsche 911 for NGK Spark Plugs; 850 hp Porsche 911 for Spec Clutch.

2012 SEMA: 530 hp Porsche 911 twin turbo, for NGK Spark Plugs; 401 hp Accord EX, for American Honda; 602whp Elantra GT, for Hyundai Motor America

2011 SEMA: 771 hp Porsche 911 turbo for NGK Spark plugs; 1004 hp Civic Si, for American Honda

2010 SEMA: 2011 533 hp Hybrid CR-Z, for American Honda

2008 SEMA: 1988 724whp Honda Civic Wagon, For Classic Honda midway

2007 SEMA: 2006 420 hp Honda Insight drag Car

2006 SEMA: Superstreet Castrol Syntec 360 hp engine build

=== Other Motorsport Activities ===
In 2015, the Bisimoto Hyundai Sonata was recognized as the most powerful Sonata sedan in history with a record 888 hp, much greater than the Dodge Challenger Hellcat.

In 2014, the Bisimoto Honda Odyssey was featured in Top Gear USA episode 'Cool Cars for Grownups' on July 8, 2014.

In 2013, the Bisimoto Honda Odyssey is featured in Autoweek, Examiner, TopGear, Autoblog and Edmunds. Autoblog

In 2012, Bisimoto designed and built a 530 HP Porsche 911 Twin Turbo Cabriolet recognized as the world's first drive-by-wire air cooled Porsche engine, with CAN BUS. Bisimoto Engineering is invited by Honda alongside DSO Eyewear/MAD Industries to take part in the 2013 Honda Accord Project Vehicle Program.

In 2011, following Honda's launch of a new grassroots racing program they invited three independent vehicle tuners to build and display their Civic Si concepts at the SEMA Show in Las Vegas, NV. Tuners were asked to push the limits of performance and style with their builds, and the vehicles on display to demonstrate the personalized potential of the Si Coupe and Sedan.
