= Zeekr 009 =

Battery electric luxury MPV

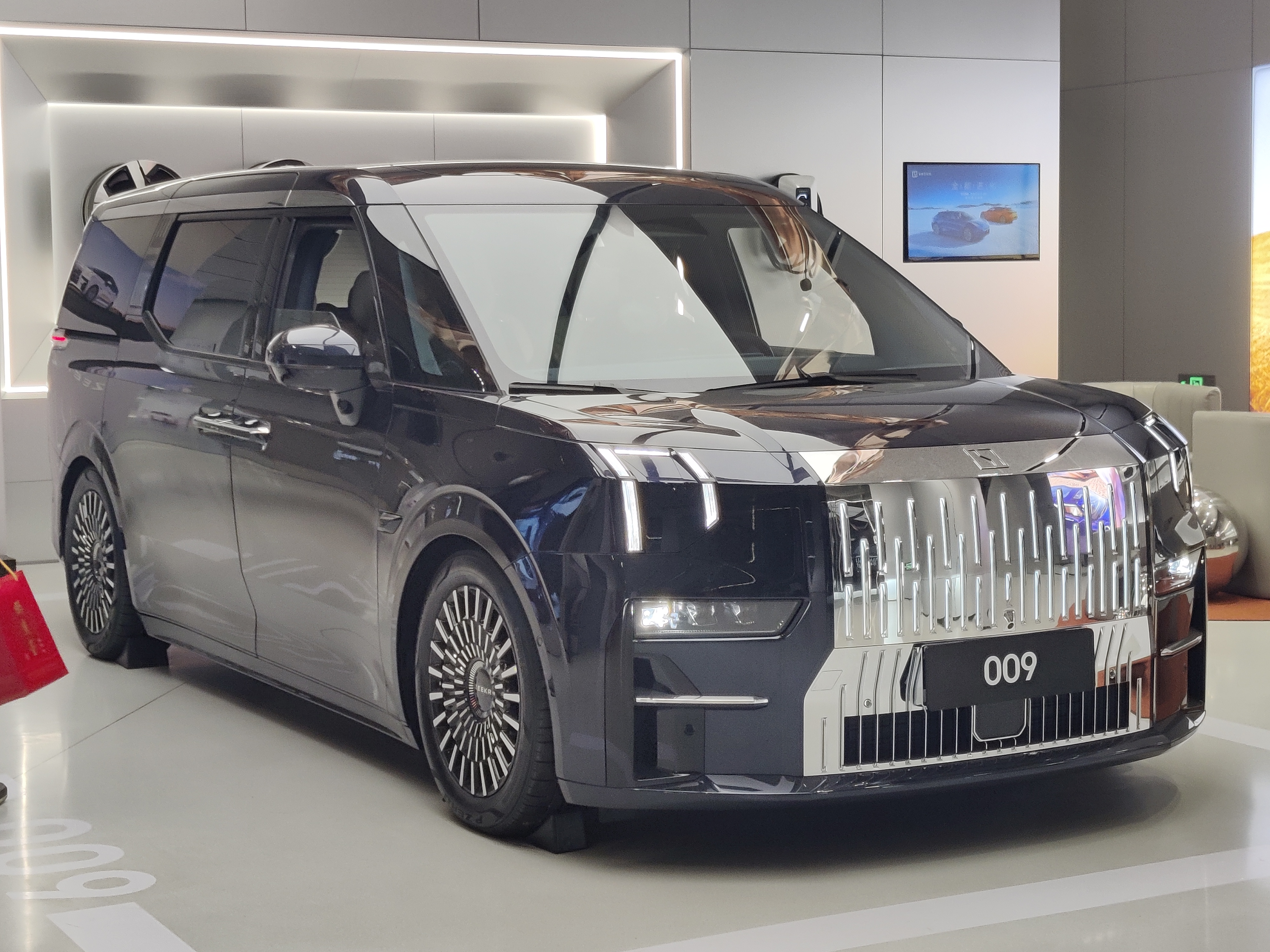
- Zeekr 009 in blue color

Overview
- Manufacturer: Zeekr (Geely Auto)
- Production: January 2023 – present
- Assembly: China: Ningbo, Zhejiang
- Designer: Jon Rådbrink under Stefan Sielaff

Body and chassis
- Class: Luxury MPV
- Body style: 5-door minivan
- Layout: Front-motor, front-wheel drive; Dual-motor, all-wheel-drive
- Platform: Sustainable Experience Architecture 1 (SEA1)
- Related: Volvo EM90; Zeekr 9X

Powertrain
- Electric motor: 1× or 2× permanent magnet synchronous
- Power output: 310–580 kW (416–778 hp; 421–789 PS)
- Battery: 108 kWh 800-Volt NMC Qilin CATL; 116 kWh NMC CATL; 140 kWh 400-Volt NMC Qilin CATL
- Electric range: 702–900 km (436–559 mi) (CLTC); 686–713 km (426–443 mi) (NEDC); 582 km (362 mi) (WLTP)

Dimensions
- Wheelbase: 3,205 mm (126.2 in)
- Length: 5,209 mm (205.1 in); 5,217 mm (205.4 in) (009 Grand)
- Width: 2,024 mm (79.7 in)
- Height: 1,812–1,858 mm (71.3–73.1 in)
- Curb weight: 2,830–2,970 kg (6,239–6,548 lb)

The Zeekr 009 (Chinese: 极氪009; pinyin: Jíkè 009) is a battery electric luxury MPV from the premium electric automobile brand Zeekr, owned by Geely Automobile Holdings and presented early 2022. The 009 is the second production vehicle under the Zeekr brand, after the 001 executive shooting brake.

== Overview ==
The Zeekr 009 electric minivan was first shown online in August 2022. Deliveries of the 009 began in the first quarter of 2023 in China. It is based on the Geely Sustainable Experience Architecture 1 platform (SEA) for electric vehicles, which is also used by the Zeekr 001 as well as the Lotus Eletre and Polestar 5.

Geely is using a Giga Press-like large aluminum die casts to produce a large rear underbody section of the vehicle, measuring 1.4 m (4.6 ft) long and 1.6 m (5.2 ft) wide, reducing the number of welding points by almost 800.

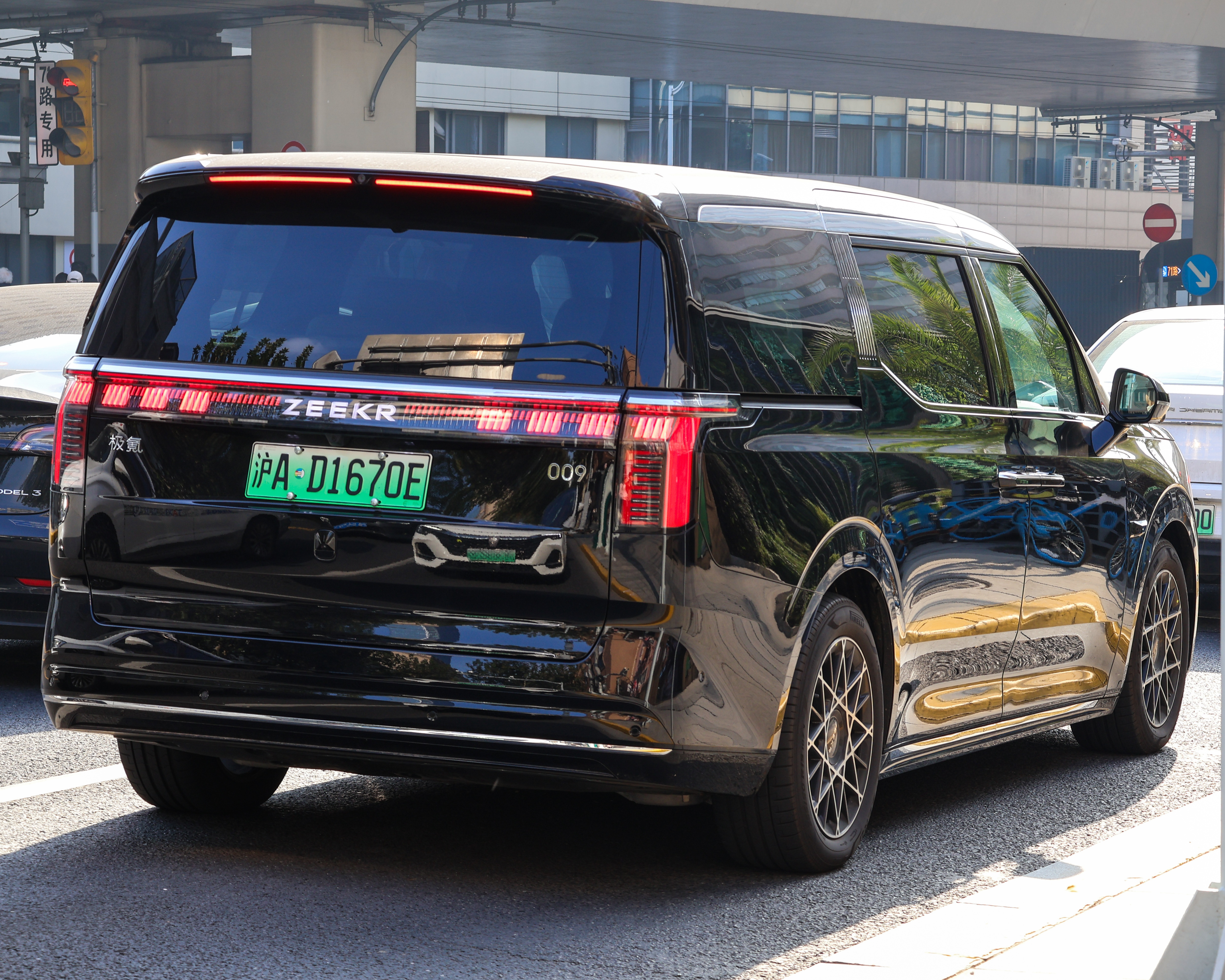
Rear view

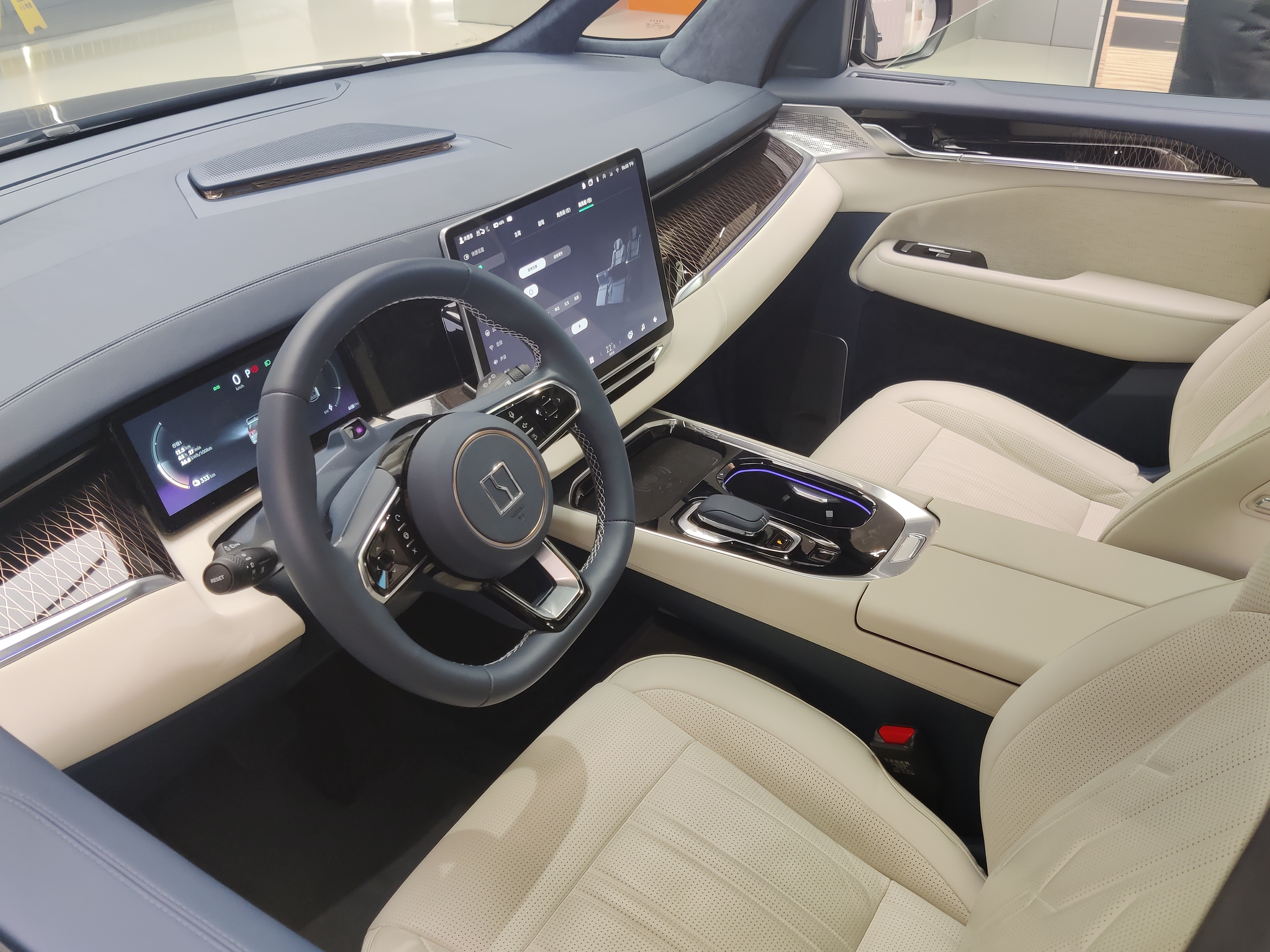
Interior

== Versions ==
=== Grand (4 seats) ===
On 19 April 2024, the Zeekr 009 Grand (009光辉) was launched in China. The 009 Grand has a four-seats (2+2) layout with ultra-luxury sofaro first class travel seats, integration of a 43-inch cloud smart screen, dual-use intelligent refrigerator for hot and cold items, air conditioning, headrest speakers, foldable table, massage functions, fragrance, foyer vase, and other functions into one intelligent curtain wall. It is equipped with 800V power electronics, 108 kWh CATL Qilin battery, magic carpet dual-chamber air suspension, and dual Qualcomm Snapdragon 8295 SoCs.

On 24 May 2024, Zeekr 009 Grand officially started delivery at Zeekr factory in Ningbo.

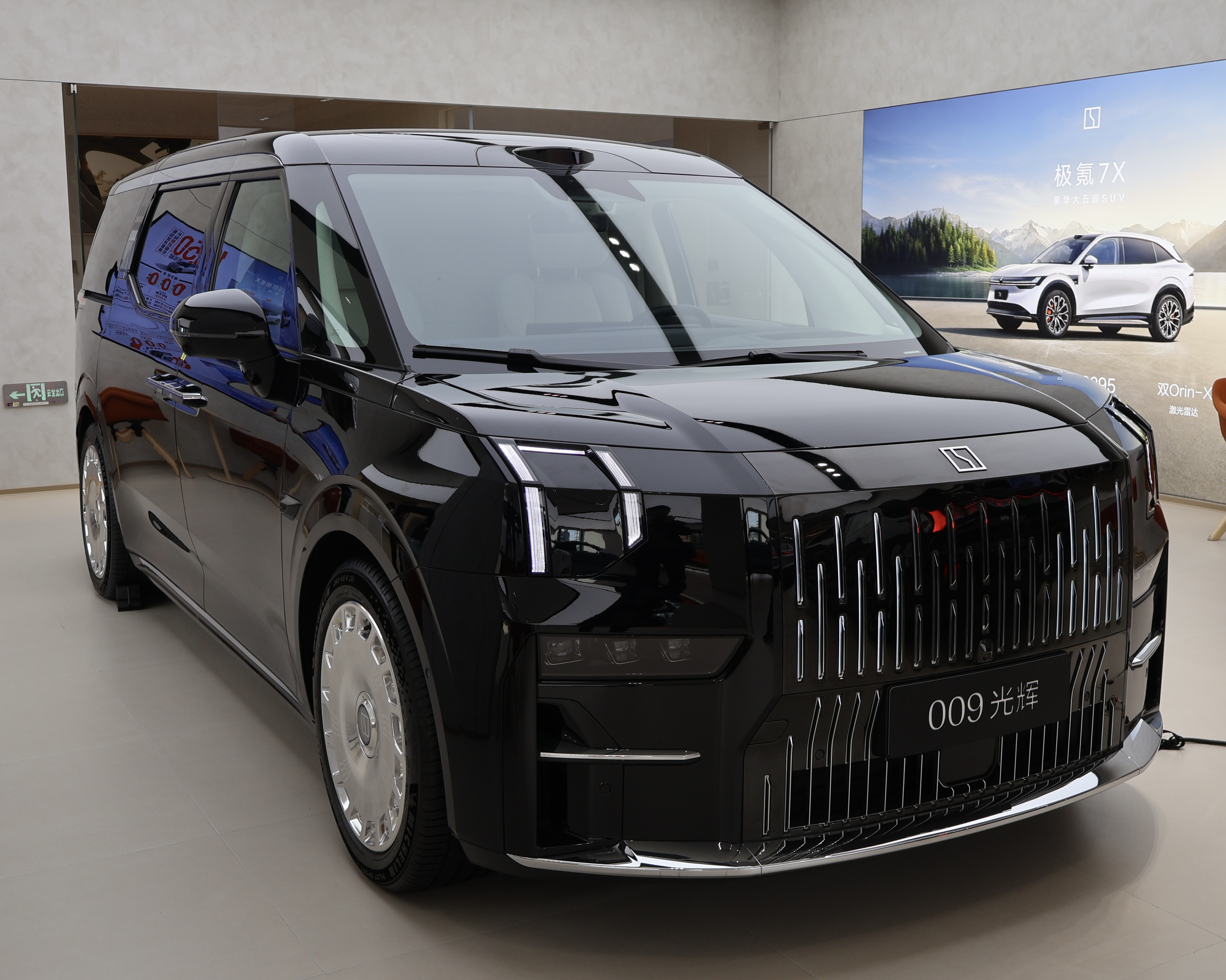
Zeekr 009 Grand front view

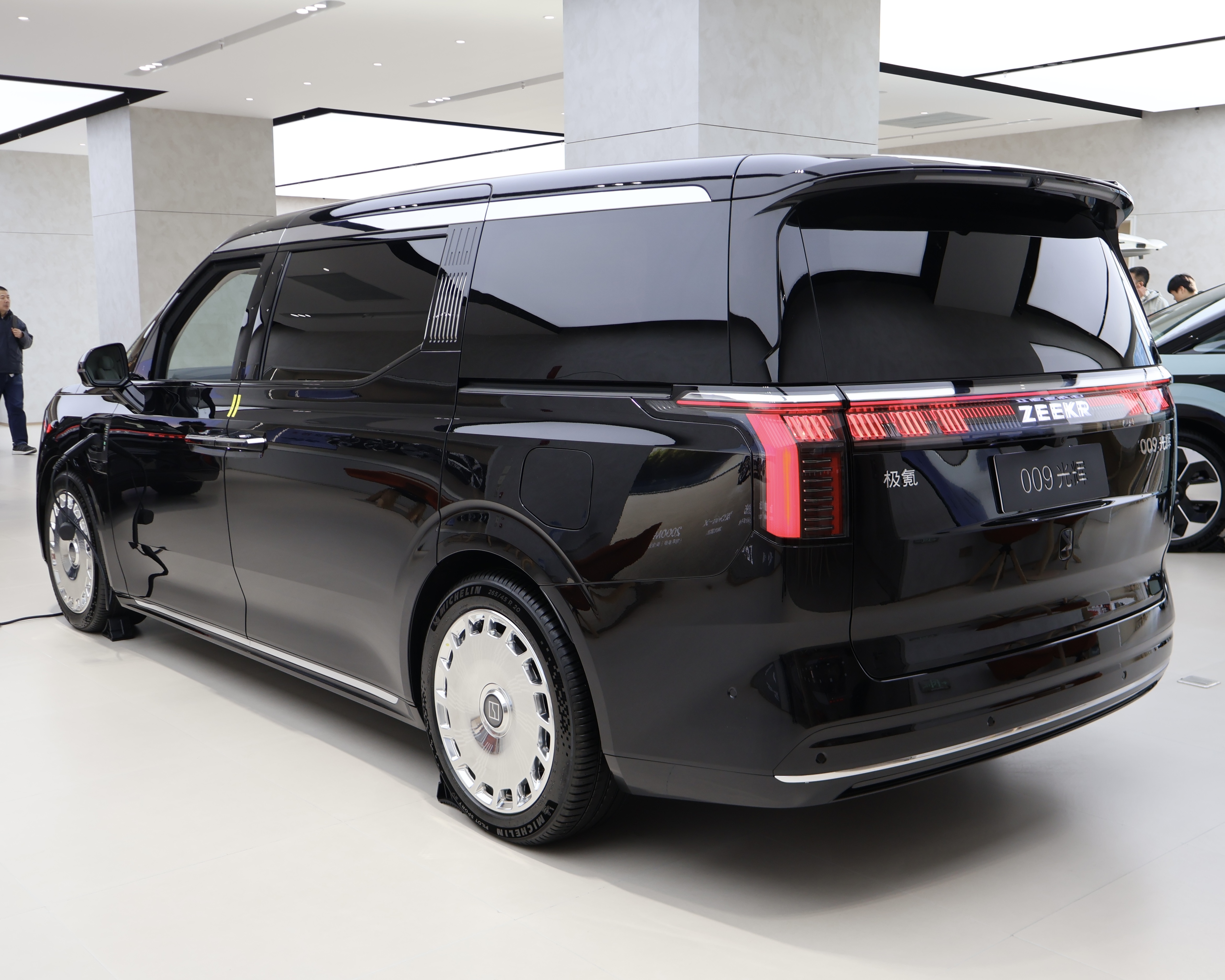
Zeekr 009 Grand rear view

=== Platinum (6 seats) ===
The 009 has Platinum six seats in a (2+2+2) layout. The vehicle is equipped with dual-chamber air suspension, a 10.2-inch digital instrument panel and a 15.4-inch central LCD touchscreen, which are both powered by a Qualcomm Snapdragon 8155 SoC. It is also equipped with a roof-mounted 17-inch LCD rear screen, and a Yamaha sound system consisting of 30 speakers. The 009 has nappa full-grain leather seats, and luxury sofaro first class travel seats with headrest speakers, foldable table, ventilation, massage, and heating functions to enhance comfort. The exclusive "lounge chair" mode allows passengers to stretch out and relax fully.

=== Premium and Deluxe (7 seats) ===
In 2024, a Premium seven seats version with a (2+2+3) business class seating layout was added. The seven-seater middle row features a central aisle, making it more convenient for third row entrance and exit. It also equipped with a hot and cold refrigerator and a central tea table, and eye protection lights are designed for passengers to ensure safety and comfort during the ride.

The Zeekr 009 Deluxe Two-wheel-drive seven seats was launched in 2025. With its ultra-low drag design and powerful electric powertrain, it achieves a maximum range of 604 km (WLTP). Features include double insulated glass, panoramic glass sunroof, ventilated seats and premium sound system.

== Markets ==
=== Asia ===
==== Hong Kong ====
The 009 was launched in Hong Kong on 19 July 2024, coincided with Zeekr's right-hand drive debut. It is available with 7-seater and 6-seater model configurations. For the Hong Kong market, it is equipped with a 400-volt architecture and a 116 kWh battery pack.

==== Malaysia ====
The 009 was launched in Malaysia on 6 December 2024, as part of Zeekr's entry to the Malaysian market. At launch, it was initially available with two variants: Luxury (7-seater) and Ultra Luxury (6-seater), both variants use the 116 kWh battery pack with a dual motor setup. In May 2025, the entry-level Executive (7-seater) variant using the 116 kWh battery pack with a single motor setup was added to the line-up.

==== Philippines ====
The 009 was launched in the Philippines on 21 May 2025. It is available with 7-seater and 6-seater variants using the 108 kWh battery pack with a dual motor setup.

==== Singapore ====
The 009 was launched in Singapore on 28 November 2024, as the second Zeekr model to be marketed in Singapore and also coincided with the opening of the 500th Zeekr global showroom in the country. At launch, it was initially available with two variants: Premium (7-seater) and Flagship (6-seater), both variants use the 116 kWh battery pack with a dual motor setup. In May 2025, the entry-level Deluxe (7-seater) variant using the 116 kWh battery pack with a single motor setup was added to the line-up.

==== Thailand ====
The 009 was launched in Thailand on 23 September 2024. Fully imported from China, it was initially available in the sole Flagship AWD (6-seater) variant using the 116 kWh battery pack. In February 2025, the entry-level Premium AWD (7-seater) variant using the 116 kWh battery pack was added to the line-up.

=== Oceania ===
==== Australia ====
The 009 was launched in Australia on 12 November 2024, as the second Zeekr model to be marketed in Australia. At launch, it was initially available with 7-seater and 6-seater variants using the 116 kWh battery pack with a dual motor setup. In November 2025, the entry-level 7-seater FWD variant using the 116 kWh battery pack with a single motor setup was added to the line-up.

==== New Zealand ====
The 009 was launched in New Zealand on 21 August 2025, as part of Zeekr's entry to the New Zealand market. It is available with 7-seater and 6-seater variants using the 116 kWh battery pack with a dual motor setup.

== Powertrain ==
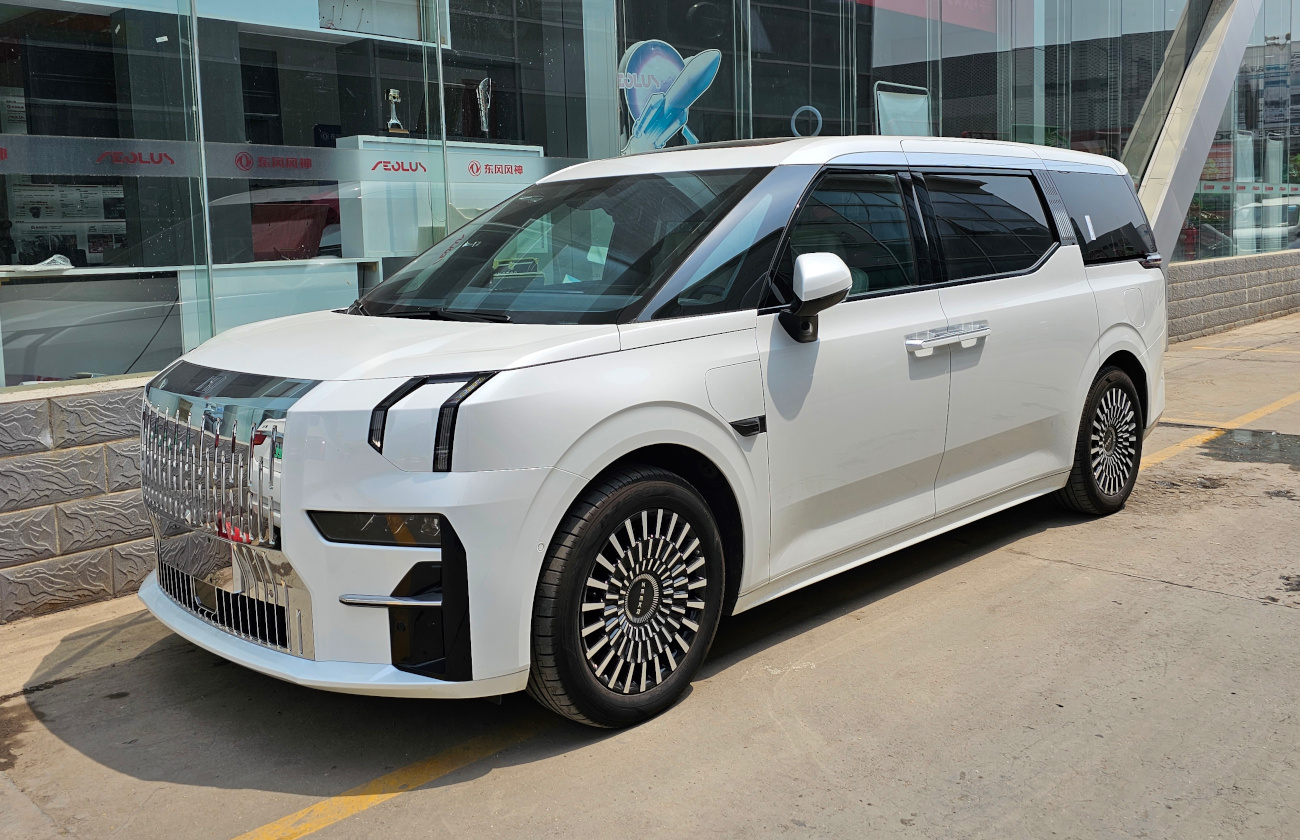
Zeekr 009 front in white color

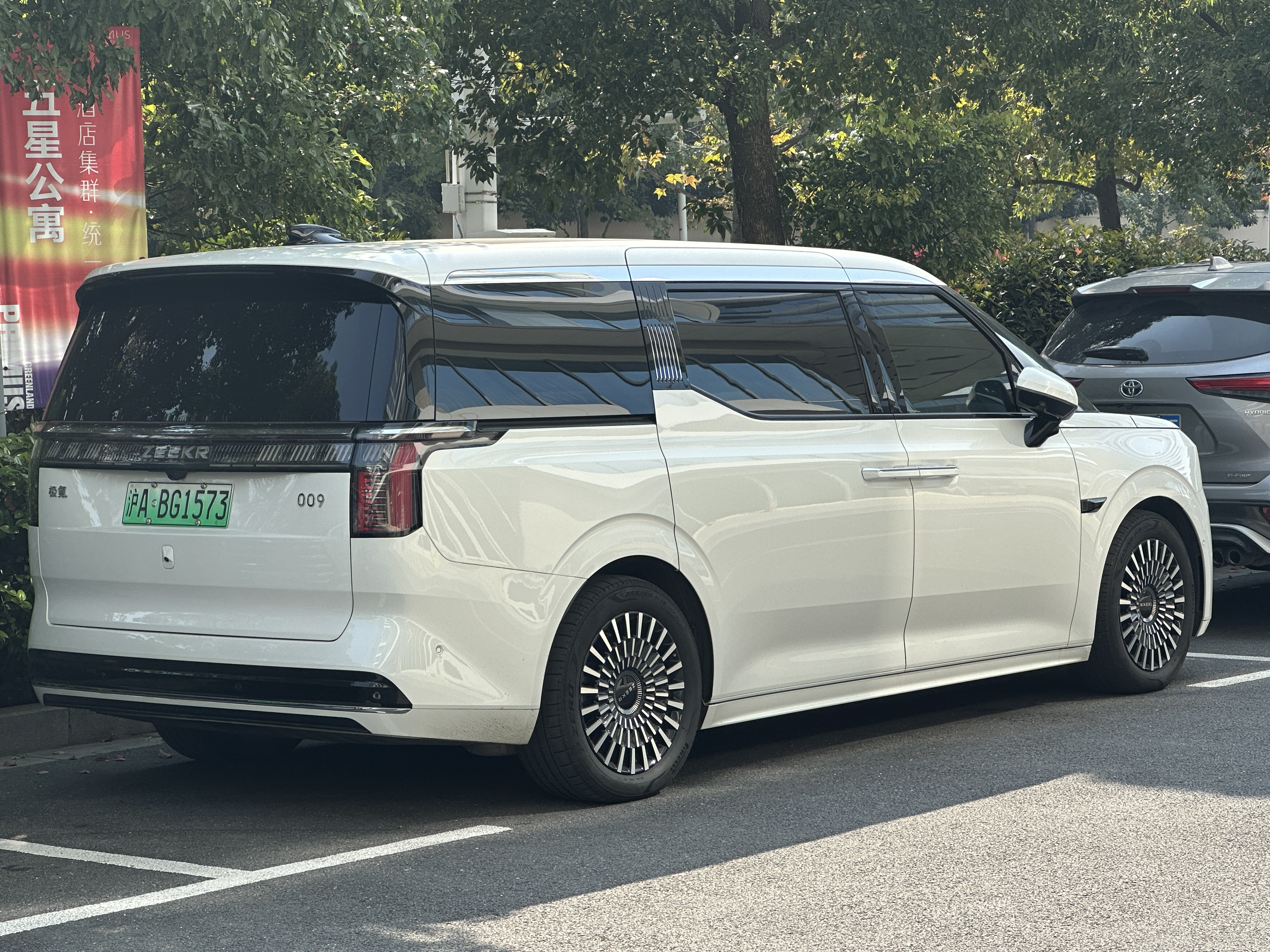
Zeekr 009 rear in white color

The Zeekr 009 has two electric motors that produce a total output of 400 kW (536 hp; 544 PS) and is the first vehicle to use CATL's Qilin cell-to-pack battery. Zeekr claims the 009 is able to accelerate 0–100 km/h (0–62 mph) in 4.5 seconds, with a top speed of 190 km/h (120 mph).

The minivan is available in China in two different grades, the WE Edition and the ME Edition. The WE Edition is equipped with a 116 kWh CATL NCM battery pack, while the ME Edition uses a 140 kWh CATL Qilin battery pack.

Model	Battery	Power	Torque	Range	Layout	Cal. years
WE Edition	116 kWh CATL NCM	400 kW (536 hp; 544 PS)	686 N⋅m (70.0 kg⋅m; 506 lb⋅ft)	702 km (436 mi) (CLTC)	AWD	2022–2024
ME Edition	140 kWh CATL Qilin	400 kW (536 hp; 544 PS)	686 N⋅m (70.0 kg⋅m; 506 lb⋅ft)	822 km (511 mi) (CLTC)	AWD	2022–2024
Grand / Glory	108 kWh CATL Qilin	580 kW (778 hp; 789 PS)	810 N⋅m (82.6 kg⋅m; 597 lb⋅ft)	702 km (436 mi) (CLTC)	AWD	2024–present
6-seat Edition	108-140 kWh CATL Liquid-cooled NMC Qilin; 116 kWh CATL NMC-Graphite	400–580 kW (536–778 hp; 544–789 PS)	686–810 N⋅m (70.0–82.6 kg⋅m; 506–597 lb⋅ft)	702–900 km (436–559 mi) (CLTC); 686 km (426 mi) (NEDC); 582 km (362 mi) (WLTP)	AWD	2024–present
7-seat Edition	108 kWh 800-Volt or 140 kWh 400-Volt CATL NMC Qilin; 116 kWh CATL NMC-Graphite	310 kW (416 hp; 421 PS) (FWD); 450–580 kW (603–778 hp; 612–789 PS) (AWD)	440–810 N⋅m (44.9–82.6 kg⋅m; 325–597 lb⋅ft)	740–900 km (460–559 mi) (CLTC); 686–713 km (426–443 mi) (NEDC)	FWD, AWD	2024–present

== Safety ==
C-NCAP (2021) test results 2024 Zeekr 009 WE (facelift) (Note: MIIT registration code: MR6525BEV05)
Category		%
Overall:	5 /5 stars	89.8%
Occupant protection:		90.48%
Vulnerable road users:		78.19%
Active safety:		95.09%

== Sales ==
Year	China	Thailand	Australia
2023	19,210	—	
2024	22,631	—	
2025	17,826	1,904	123
