= Volvo EM90 =

Battery electric luxury minivan

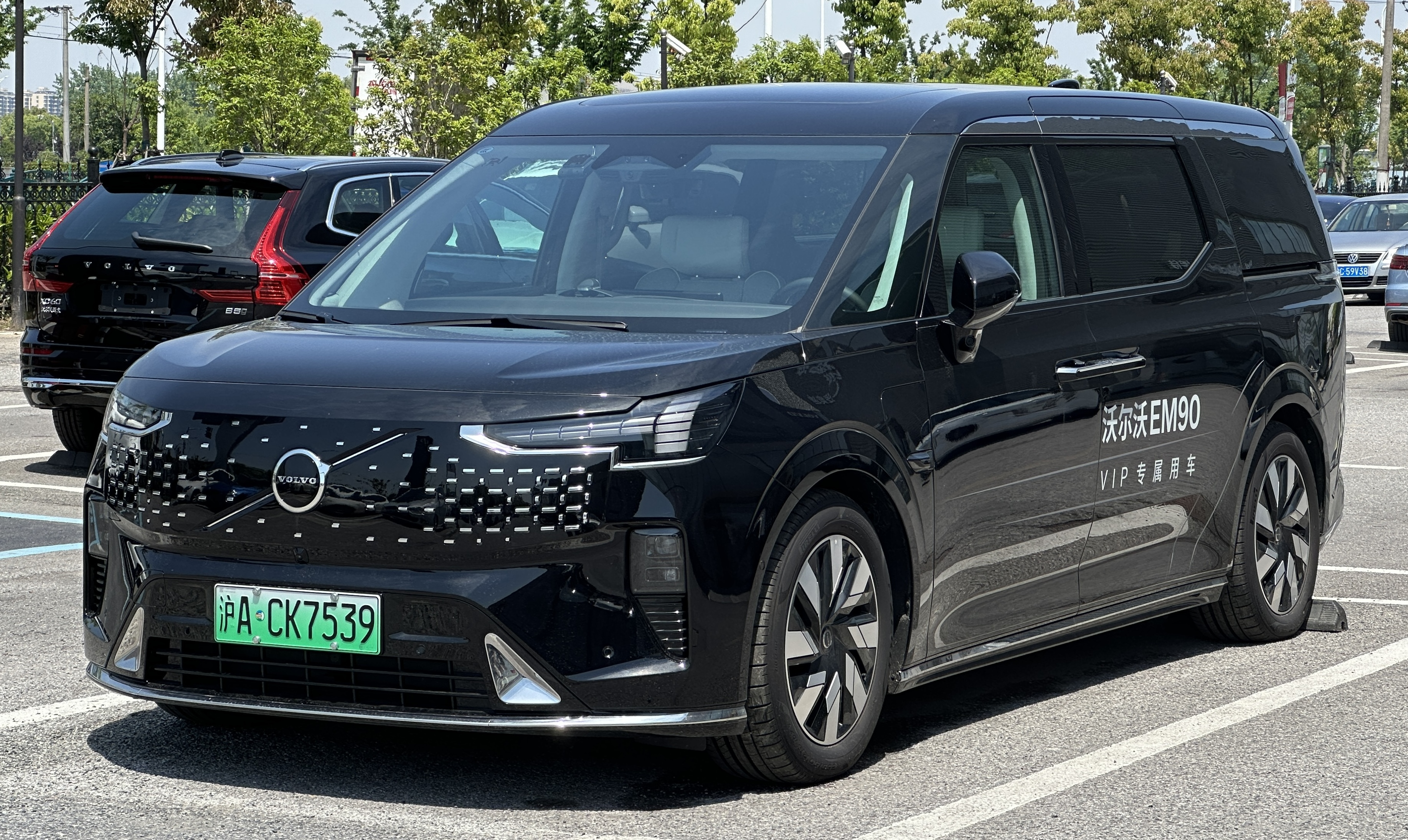

Overview
- Manufacturer: Volvo Cars
- Production: 2024–present
- Assembly: China: Ningbo

Body and chassis
- Class: Luxury MPV
- Body style: 5-door Minivan
- Layout: Rear-motor, rear-wheel-drive
- Platform: Sustainable Experience Architecture 1 (SEA1)
- Related: Zeekr 009

Powertrain
- Power output: 200 kW (268 hp; 272 PS)
- Battery: 116 kWh CATL
- Range: 739 km (459 mi) (CLTC)

Dimensions
- Wheelbase: 3,205 mm (126.2 in)
- Length: 5,206 mm (205.0 in)
- Width: 2,024 mm (79.7 in)
- Height: 1,859 mm (73.2 in)
- Curb weight: 2,763 kg (6,091 lb)

The Volvo EM90 is a battery electric luxury minivan produced by Volvo. The vehicle was introduced on 12 November 2023.

== Overview ==
The Volvo EM90 shares a platform with the Zeekr 009, with the front and rear end restyled exclusively for the Volvo brand. Instead of running in both front-wheel drive and all-wheel drive like the 009 counterpart, it uses an rear-wheel drive system. It offers flagship six seats in (2+2+2) layout with Sofaro first class travel seats with headrest-integrated speakers and ventilation, massage, and heating functions. It is also equipped with a roof-mounted 17-inch OLED rear entertainment display and a 21-speaker Bowers & Wilkins sound system. It will initially be available exclusively in the Chinese market, with expansion to other markets under consideration.

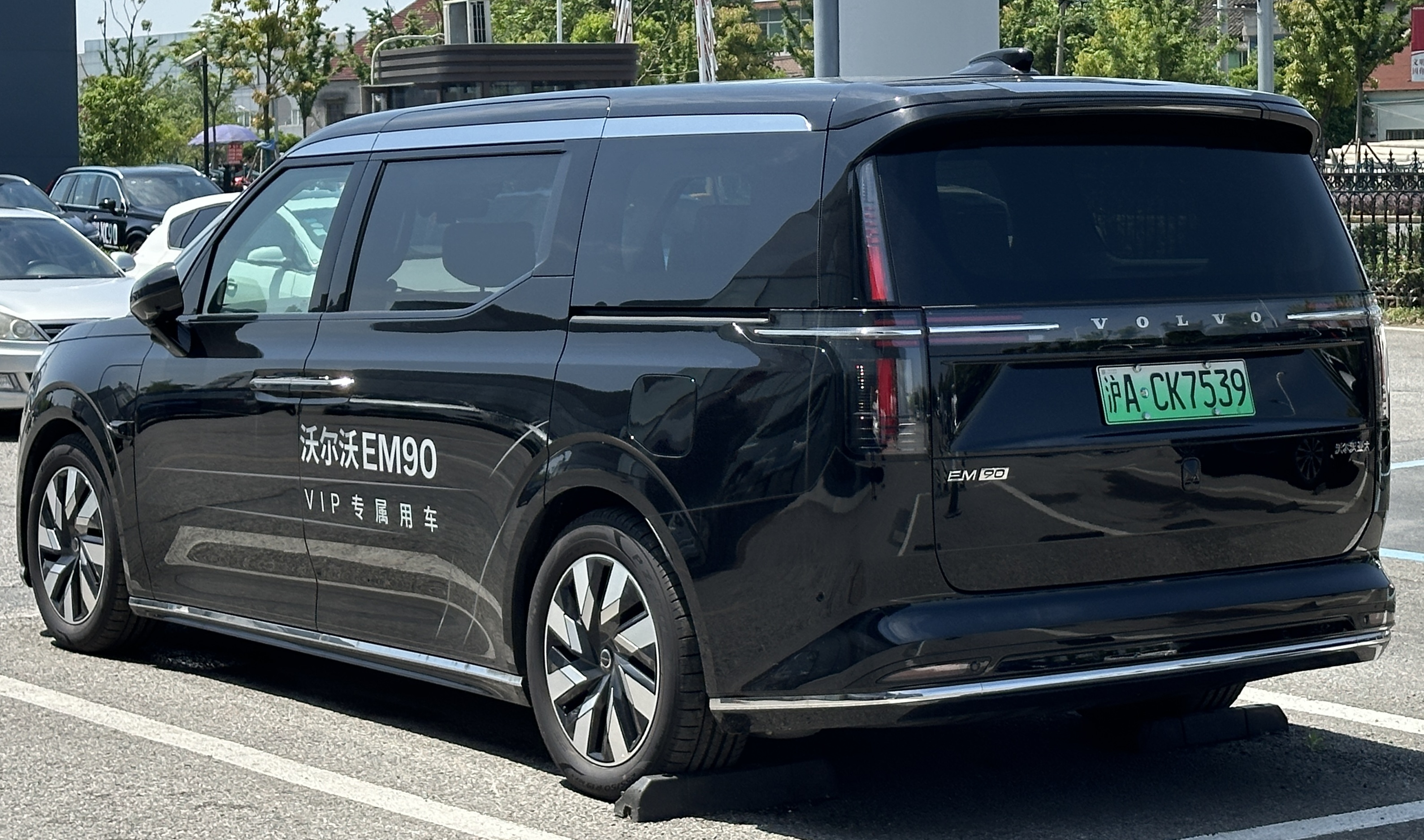
Rear view

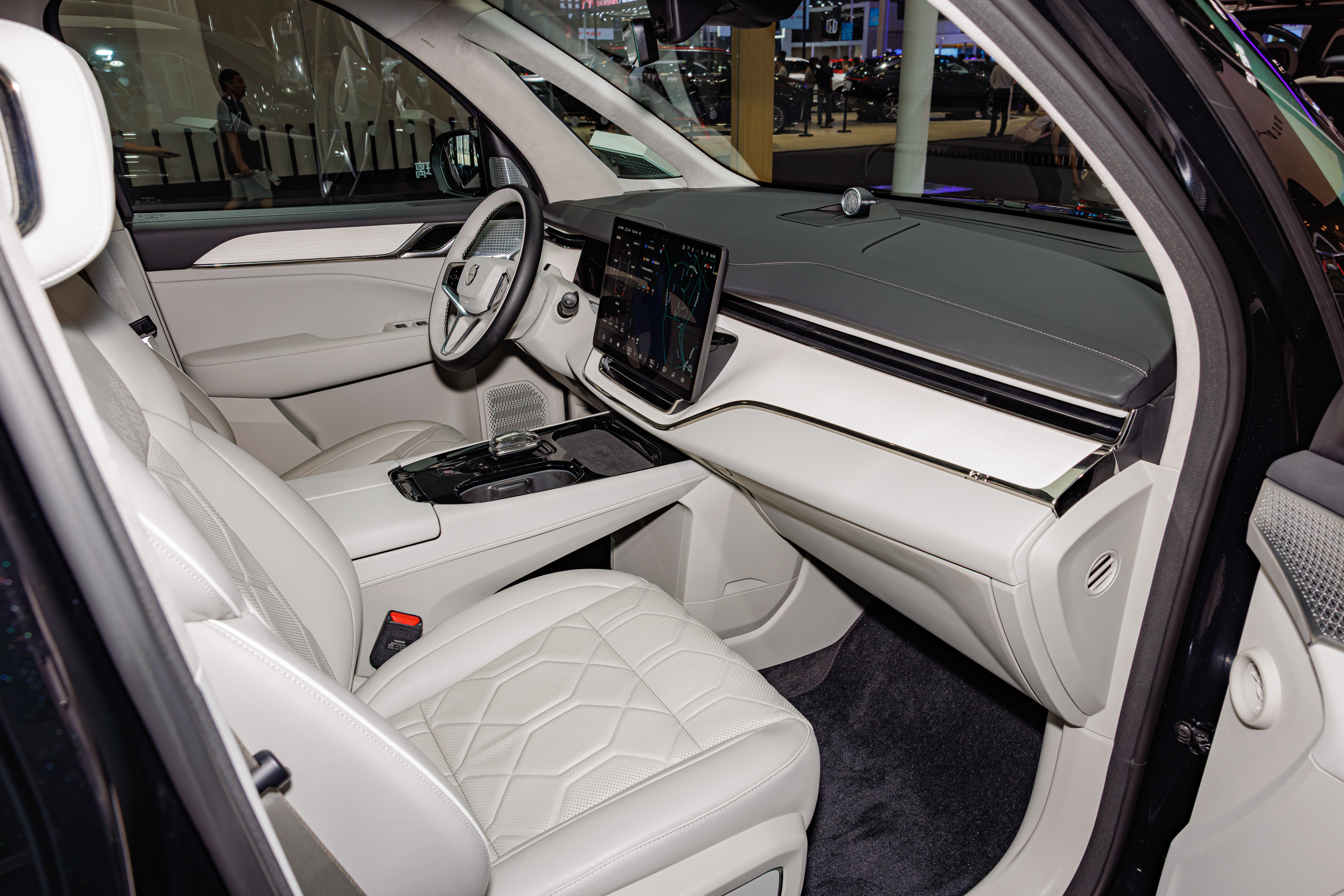
Interior

== Sales ==
Year	China
2024	1,549
2025	802
