= Sandy Munro =

Automotive engineer

- Sandy Munro (right) in 2022 in front of a Giga Press with Idra manager John Stokes
- Occupation: Engineer

Sandy Munro is an automotive engineer who specializes in machine tools and manufacturing.

He started as a toolmaker at the Valiant Machine & Tool company – a General Motors supplier in Windsor. In 1978, he joined the Ford Motor Company where he improved methods of engine assembly.

In 1988, he started his own consultancy, Munro & Associates, in Troy, Michigan, specializing in lean design, tearing down automotive products to study and suggest improvements and innovations. Now located in Auburn Hills, Michigan, the company performs electric vehicle benchmarking and consults in the aerospace, defense and medical sectors.

In 2018, he started broadcasting video analyses and interviews on his YouTube channel, Munro Live. The channel has over 425,000 subscribers and raised the profile of his consultancy during the COVID-19 pandemic, when meetings and trade shows were restricted.

In 2026, he sold his company.

== Early life ==
Munro was born on 19. January 1949 and grew up in Windsor, Ontario, Canada. Munro said he first started working by picking tomatoes at age 9. He started his engineering career as a toolmaker at the Valiant Machine & Tool company which mainly supplied General Motors. He then joined Ford in 1978 where he became a manufacturing engineer and coordinator, improving methods of engine assembly. He then started his own consultancy in Troy, Michigan in 1988 and now has dual Canadian-US citizenship.

== Teardown reports ==
Munro's consultancy specialises in deconstructing automobiles and has analysed the construction of hundreds of vehicles. The detailed analyses are sold to manufacturers and suppliers who use the information to help plan, price and improve their products. For example, they studied the BMW i3 in 2015 – an innovative electric car which made extensive use of carbon composites and hemp. Their detailed cost analysis cost $2.1 million to produce and originally sold for $89,000. The report was 23,793 pages long, divided into the following sections:

1. Body
2. Exterior
3. Rolling chassis
4. Battery system
5. Electronics
6. Cooling
7. Drive and motor
8. Range extender (ReX)
9. Impact protection and interior trim
10. Seats

In 2020, the report was made available to the public as a sample of their work. Sandy Munro also hoped that this might inspire a future engineer, as he had been impressed when he was an apprentice and a retiring engineer had made the bargain offer of his expensive toolkit for just a "buck a drawer".

Other electric cars analysed include the Chevrolet Bolt, Jaguar I-Pace, Tesla Model 3 and Tesla Model Y. They initially found that the Tesla cars had innovative and unusual electronics and power engineering but poor bodywork and production design.

Munro & Associates consulted on the production design for several electrical vehicles including the Aptera three wheeled autocycle.

== Methodologies ==
Munro advises and consults on the implementation and use of manufacturing methodologies including Design for Manufacture and Assembly (DFMA) and lean design. He introduced DFMA to Ingersoll Rand in 1989. Munro's main design principles are:

1. Teamwork
2. Reducing the number of parts
3. Layered assembly from above, using gravity
4. Easy alignment and insertion
5. Avoid expensive fastening
6. Bulk storage to reduce handling problems
7. Poka-yoke – making operations foolproof to avoid errors
8. Self assembly so that parts naturally engage
9. Simplify packaging and servicing
10. Avoid adjustment and repositioning of the assembly

== Munro Live ==
Sandy Munro gained larger public interest starting in February 2018 with videos containing detailed tear-down and analysis of the then-new Tesla Model 3. Munro & Associates then started their own channel, Munro Live, with tear-down and analysis of a variety of mostly electric vehicles and covering related topics around engineering and design methodologies. This channel attracted lots of viewers which raised the profile of the company which was then able to expand its staff and premises despite the lockdowns and restrictions of the pandemic.

In 2021, Munro recorded and published an interview with Tesla, Inc. CEO Elon Musk. They discussed the production of Tesla automobiles, including details such as the use of large castings in place of assemblies and the in-house design and production of the seats. In its first year, this interview received over three million views on YouTube.
