= Idra Group =

Italian die casting machinery company

Coordinates: 45.5353°N 10.1103°E

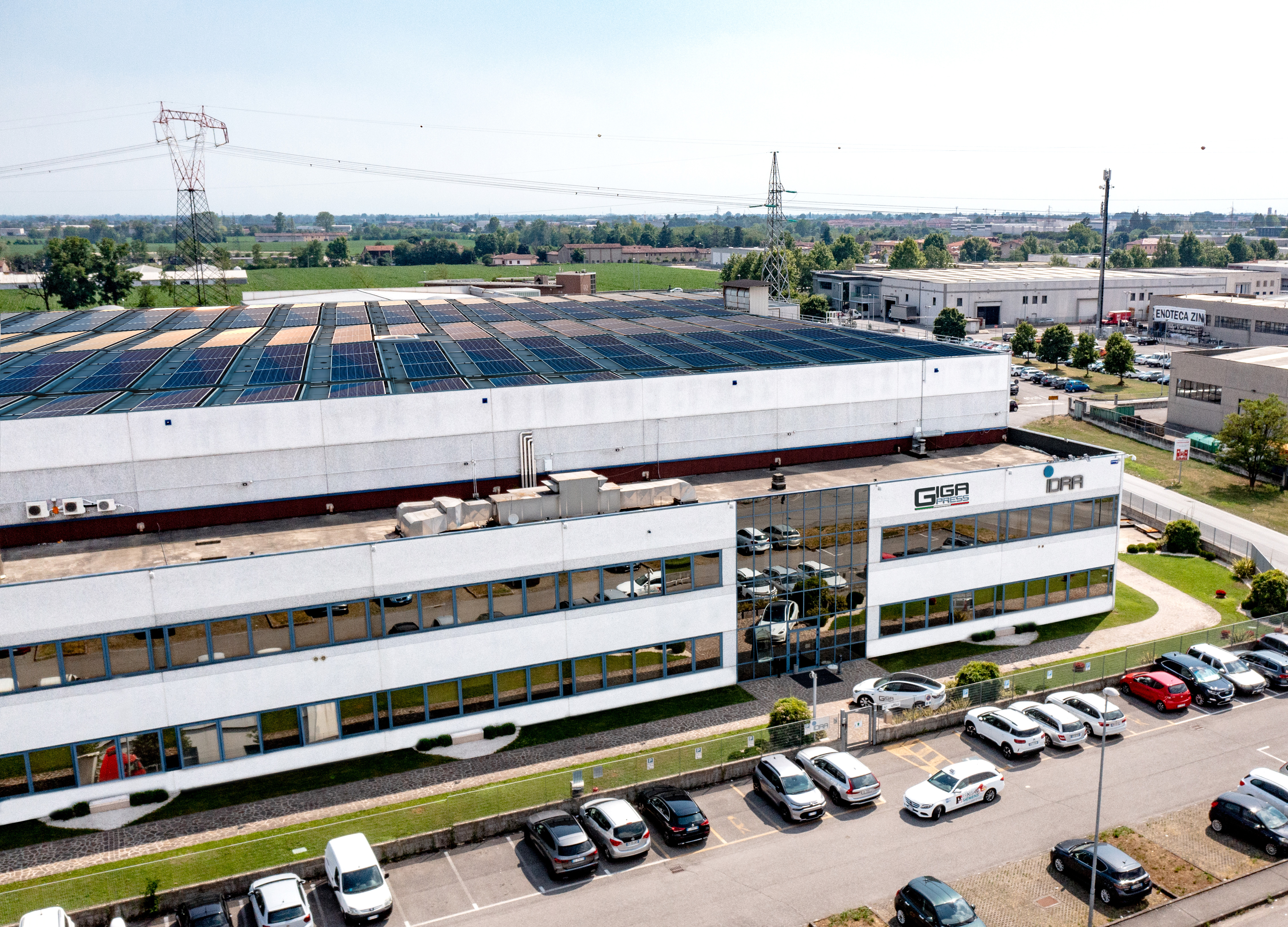
- Formerly: Idra Presse; Idra; Costruzioni Idromeccaniche Bresciane
- Company type: Private
- Industry: Die casting
- Founded: 1946; 80 years ago in Brescia, Italy
- Founder: Adamo Pasotti
- Headquarters: Travagliato, Italy
- Area served: Worldwide
- Key people: Riccardo Ferrario
- Products: Giga Press; Die-casting machines
- Revenue: €87 million (2015)
- Number of employees: 161 (2015)
- Parent: LK Machinery
- Subsidiaries: Idra North America inc. - Idra Mexico - Idra Pressen GmbH - Idra China ltd.

Idra Group (Idra S.r.l.; originally Idra Presse S.p.A.) is a manufacturer of die casting machinery, founded in 1946 in Brescia, Italy. The company is notable for producing the largest high-pressure die casting machines in the world.

== History ==
The company was originally founded by Adamo Pasotti in 1944 or 1946 with the factory located on via Triumplina in Brescia.

By 1956, Idra was seeking to export its die-casting machines outside Italy.

By 1971, an Idra OL-1200 S machine was being used to cast motor components weighing 7 kilograms (15 lb) for Porsche cars.

Idra General Manager John Stokes (left) with Sandy Munro in front of the 9000t Giga Press for the Tesla Cybertruck

In March 2024, Riccardo Ferrario retired as general manager of Idra, with the role being taken over by John Stokes.

=== Hot years ===
During Italy's Years of Lead in the 1970s, Giovanni Maifredi worked at Idra as a warehouse worker, having been provided with a job without having any qualifications. Following the Piazza della Loggia bombing in Brescia on 28 May 1974, Idra factory workers organised a fifteen-day strike action and picket line outside the Idra factory.

== Original site ==
The original factory site at via Triumplina 43 in the north of Brescia was developed into the Triumplina Retail Park, requiring construction of new roundabout junctions.

== Ownership ==
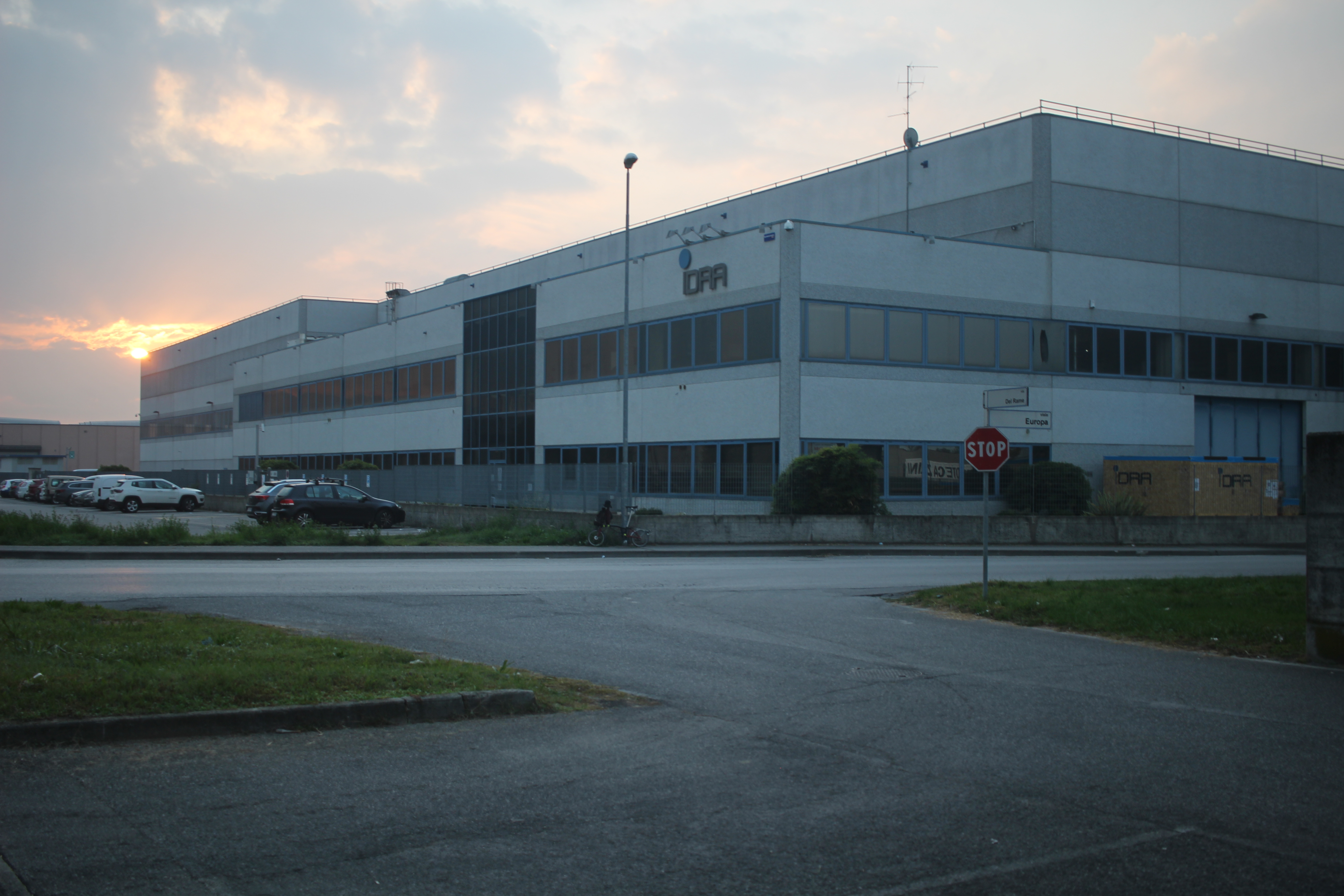
Sunrise over Idra factory

As of 2006, Idra was 30% owned by the Intesa Sanpaolo Bank, with 70% of the remaining shares acquired by LK Machinery, a company listed on the Hong Kong Stock Exchange.

For the year 2015, Idra employed 161 people, and had a turnover of €87 million, with a profit of €3 million.

By 2016, LK Machinery had acquired the remainder of the outstanding shares.

== Development ==
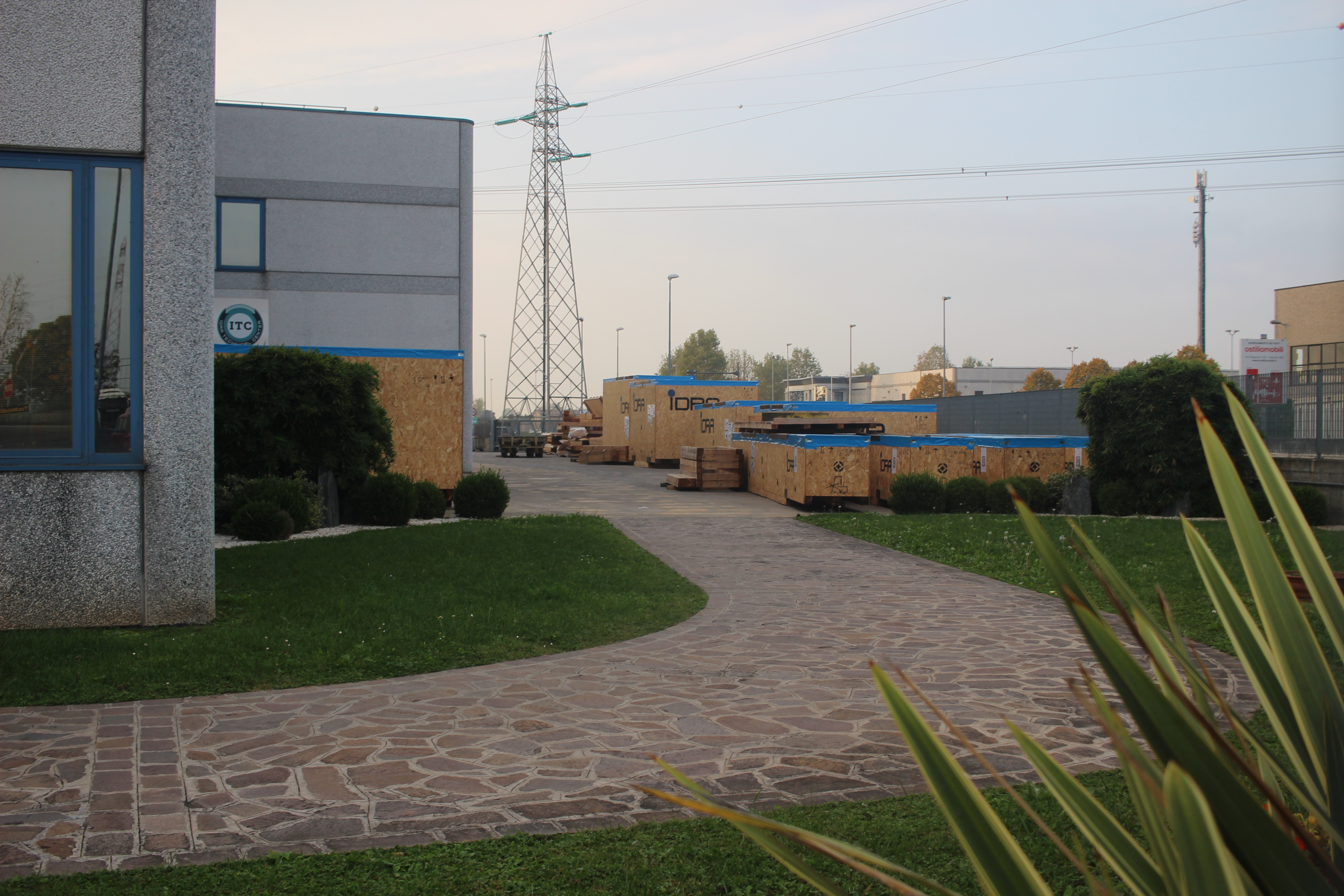
Boxed up Giga Press die casting machine outside Idra factory

In 2000, Idra filed a patent application for die casting machine designed to produce two separate castings simultaneously from a single injection of liquid metal.

On August 20, 2020, the first Giga Press installed at a U.S. electric-car-only manufacturer customer produced castings.

As of May 2025, Idra were providing sponsorship to Prema Racing starting with the Indycar 2025 Indianapolis 500. The Idra-sponsored car driven by Robert Shwartzman took pole position in qualifying.
