= Giga Press =

Series of aluminium die casting machines

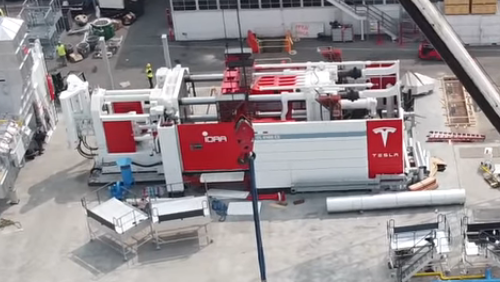
- Die Casting Machine #2 at Tesla Factory, Fremont, 2020
- Classification: High-pressure die-casting (HPDC)
- Industry: Metal casting
- Application: Car chassis production
- Dimensions: 19.5 m × 5.9 m × 5.3 m 64 by 19 by 17 feet
- Weight: 410–430 tonnes 900,000–950,000 lb
- Fuel source: Electric
- Powered: 2 × 132kW motors; 4 × 90kW motors
- Invented: ~2018
- Examples: 12+ (Tesla, Inc.); 1 (Glovitech)
- Model: OL 9000 CS (Idra); OL 6100 CS (Idra); DCC 6000 (LK)

The Giga Press program is a series of aluminium die casting machines manufactured for Tesla, initially by Idra Group in Italy. Idra presses were the largest high-pressure die casting machines in production as of 2020, with a clamping force of 55,000 to 61,000 kilonewtons (5,600 to 6,200 tf). Each machine weighs 410–430 tonnes (900,000–950,000 lb).

Base specification Giga Press machines were included in Idra's catalogue in 2018. Tesla began using a custom OL 6100 CS Giga Press in late-2020 for integrated die-casting production of chassis parts for the Tesla Model Y.

Shots of molten aluminium weighing 80 kilograms (180 lb) are injected into the cold-chamber casting mold with a velocity of 10 metres per second (22 mph; 36 km/h). The cycle time is ~80–90 seconds, allowing an initial output rate of 40‒45 completed castings per hour, or ~1,000 castings per day.

== Operation ==
Giga Press in closed position during casting + after removal of previous casting; and in open position for robot removal of casting + cleaning.

Die casting works by forcing molten metal alloy inside a reusable mold, then opening the mold to remove the finished piece after it cools and solidifies. The opened mold is cooled to 185 °C (365 °F) and cleaned by robots, and fresh molten aluminium is prepared for the next cycle to begin 1‒2 minutes after the first cycle. Each fresh casting is trimmed to approximate size, measured, checked for imperfections, and sent for CNC machining to finished size.

Ingots and off-cuts of aluminium are melted in a natural gas-powered melting oven operating at 850 °C (1,600 °F), until liquid. Slag in the form of aluminium oxide is mechanically removed from the surface, and the rest of the liquid metal is pumped through heated pipes to an enclosed warming oven operating at 750–850 °C (1,400–1,600 °F), heated using 400 kilowatts (0.4 MW) of electrical power. To prevent the formation of oxides, a tank blanket of nitrogen gas covers the molten aluminium, which is circulated to maintain an even temperature. Argon gas and a rotary-degasser are used to remove impurities, with a silicon carbide filter removing most other particles larger than 25 micrometres (1 thou).

At the beginning of each casting cycle machines spray 35 millilitres (1.2 imp fl oz; 1.2 US fl oz) of soybean oil in a thin layer inside each half of the mold to allow separation. The mold is closed, and a low vacuum of 50 millibars (50 hPa) created by pumping the air out. A precise amount of molten metal is pumped from the holding oven into the casting chamber at 750 °C (1,400 °F), and forced into the mold using a high-speed plunger with an additional 8 millilitres (0.28 imp fl oz; 0.27 US fl oz) of lubricant. The mold is opened, and the raw casting removed at 400 °C (750 °F).

A machine reaches in and removes the casting, placing it in a quenching tank to reduce the temperature from 400 to 50 °C (750 to 120 °F). A mechanical trim press cuts the approximate edges, recycling excess aluminium into the melting oven. The remaining useful part of the casting is X-rayed to check its internal structure, trimmed by laser, drilled for fittings, and then computer-measured for precision.

=== Die structure ===
Tesla's Model Y rear casting dies have four known visible parts:

- two large classic main facing dies, oriented vertically with injection from the bottom of the immobile one.
- two smaller side wedging dies, moving in for injection and out for removal.

The front casting suggests an identical die layout, with a possible fifth wedging die underneath (process) for the front-facing (car) crash rail mount.

=== Metal alloy ===
Sandy Munro analysed a Model Y casting in 2021 and reported that the casting aluminium alloy used in the large Tesla chassis parts is primarily an aluminium 89.5%‒silicon 8.5% mix, plus several other trace elements, falling within the categorization of Aluminium Association alloy "AA 386":

Analyzed alloy composition of Tesla Model Y megacasting
Element	Name	Percentage
Al	Aluminium	89.482%
Si	Silicon	8.525%
Cu	Copper	0.790%
Mn	Manganese	0.455%
Fe	Iron	0.277%
Mg	Magnesium	0.075%
Zn	Zinc	0.020%
V	Vanadium	0.015%
Ti	Titanium	0.013%
Ni	Nickel	0.009%
Zr	Zirconium	0.005%
Pb	Lead	0.004%
Sb	Antimony	0.000%

=== Components ===
Vacuum inside the closed mold is achieved using a 4,000-litre tank made by Fondarex in Switzerland.

Molten metal is pumped through heated pipes, and rotary degassing is performed to reduce porosity.

Steps and machinery involved:

- StrikoMelter Melting and Holding Furnace (850 °C, 1,560 °F)
- Holding oven (~750–850 °C, 1,380–1,560 °F)
- Giga Press ("DCM"‒Die-casting machine)
- Quench oil tank
- Mechanical trim press
- X-Ray machine (porosity check)
- Plasma arc trimming.
- Drill and tap (machining)
- Laser scanning (coordinate-measuring machine, CMM)
- Fastener insertion
- Scrap metal shredder (immediate closed loop recycling of aluminium offcuts)
- Vacuum system

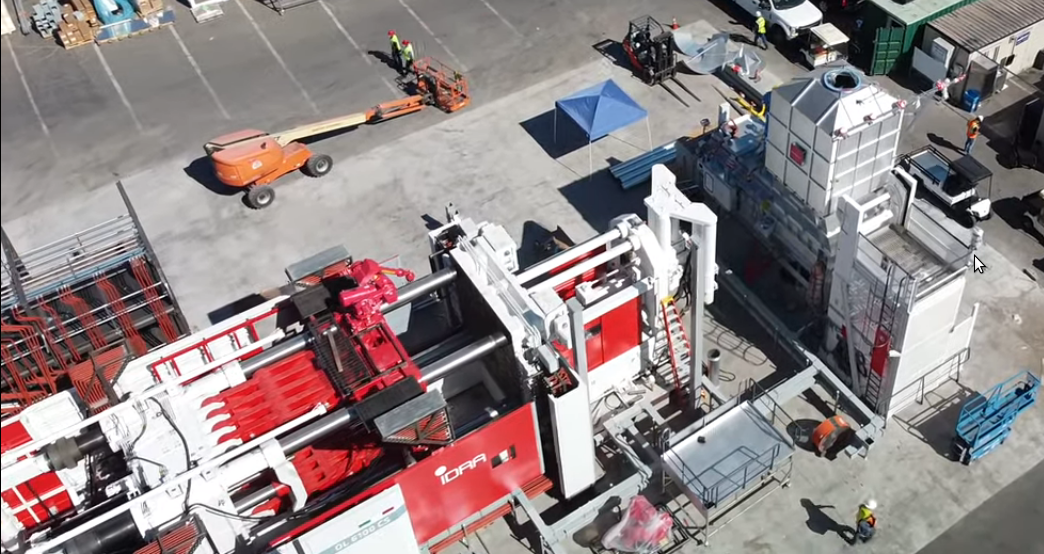
Internals of second Tesla-customised Idra OL 6100 CS Giga Press, with gap for die casting molds, between plattens and moving compression toggles

== History ==
=== Tesla ===
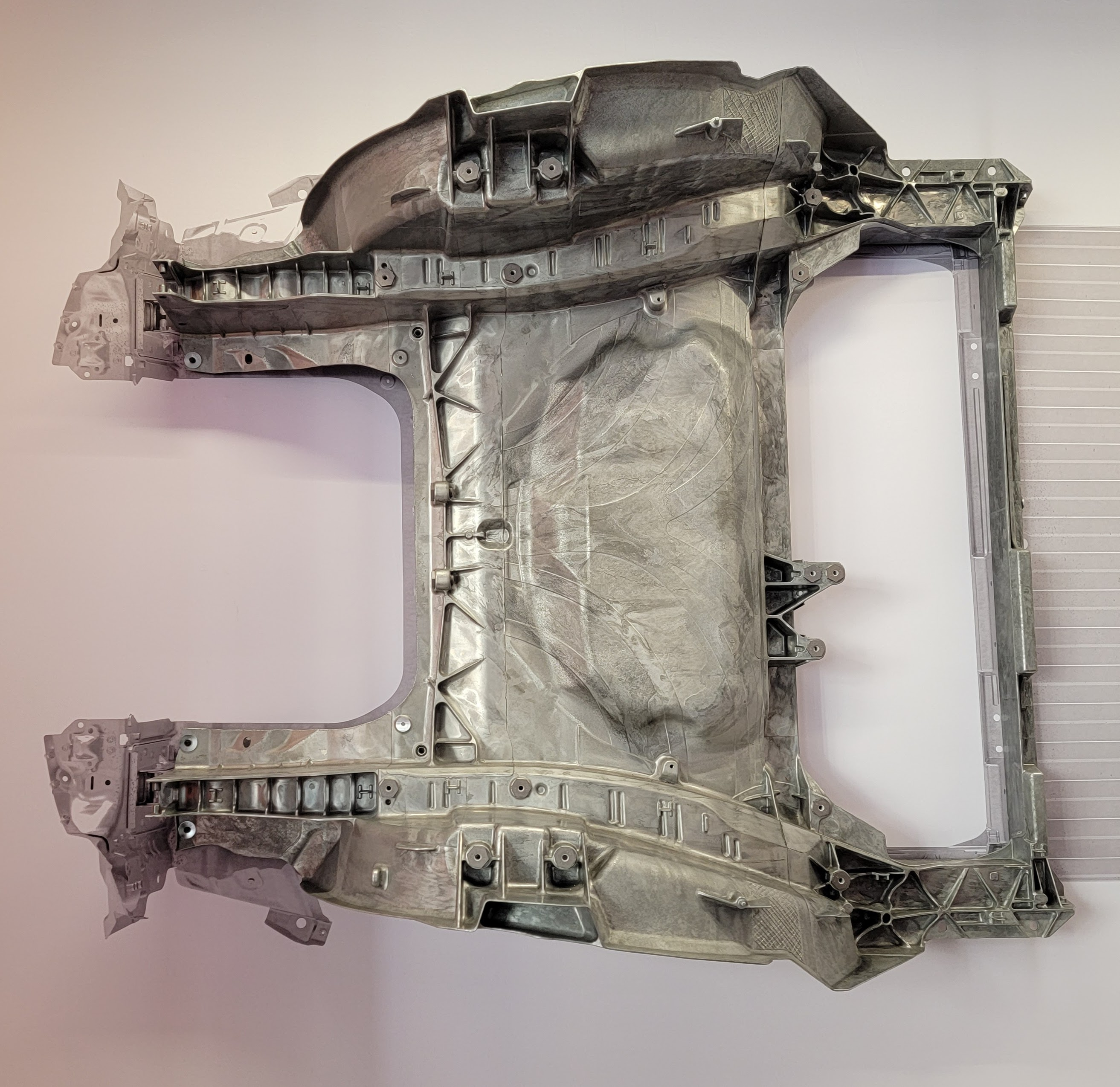
Gigacasted part of Tesla chassis

In 2019 Jerome Guillen indicated that Tesla Automation were working on a "giant, giant, giant machine" to "make full-size cars in the same way that toy cars are made".

With our giant casting machines, we are literally trying to make full-size cars in the same way that toy cars are made

— Elon Musk, (18 January 2021)

In April 2020, Tesla CEO Elon Musk said that Tesla had purchased the two biggest casting machines in the world to cast the Tesla Model Y rear chassis and crash rails. In January 2021, Musk stated that the rear chassis of the Tesla Cybertruck would be produced using a casting machine larger than 8,000-tonne-force (80,000 kN).

As of October 2021, Tesla had five casting machines installed at Giga Shanghai, two machines installed at Tesla Factory in Fremont, two machines installed at Giga Berlin, and two machines going into Giga Texas—plus foundations in preparation for many additional Giga Press machines.

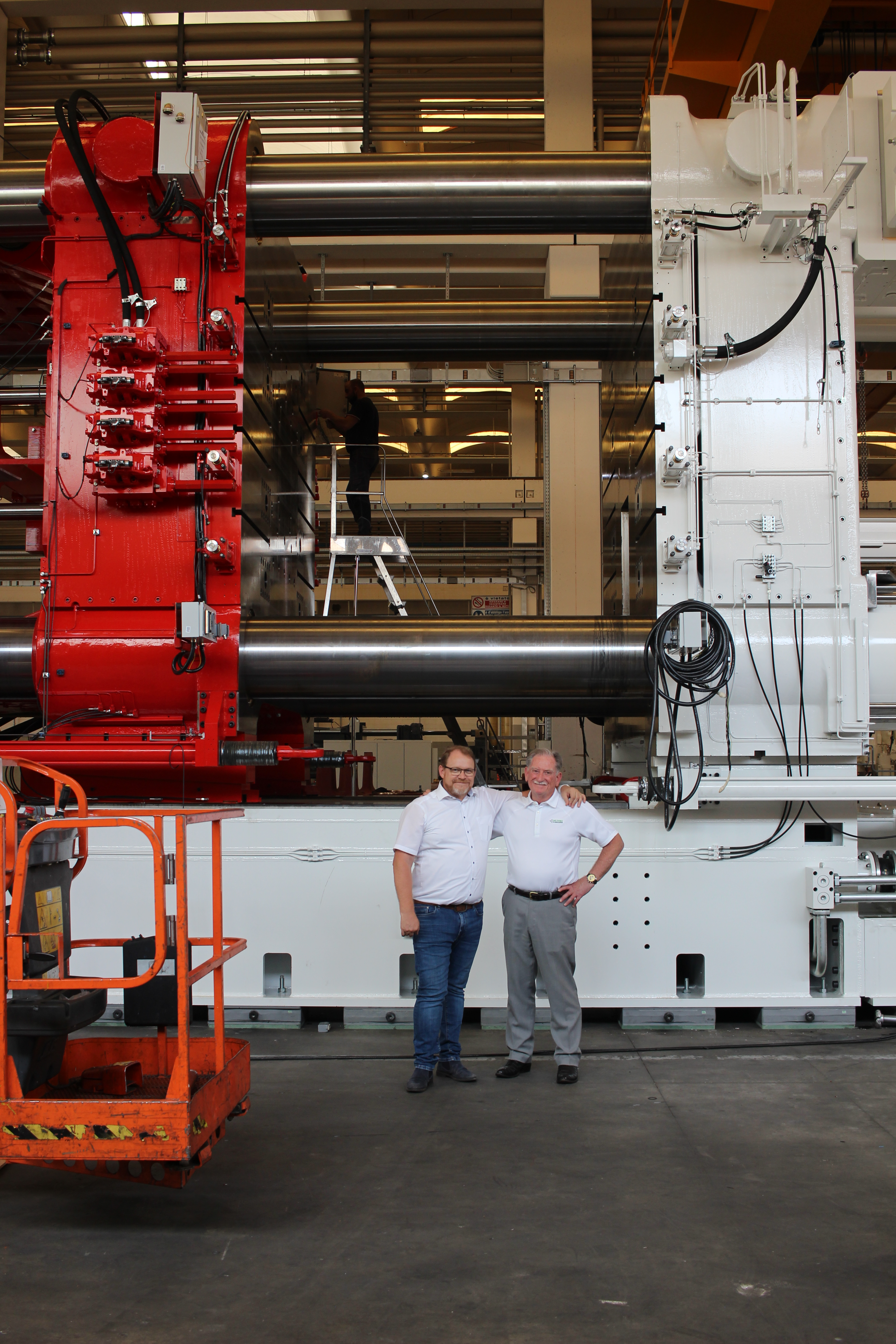
Compression plates of OL 9000 CS (9000 tonne·force) Giga Press, photographed in Italy during Idra Open House tour (2022)

During May/June 2022, Idra were assembling a 9,000 tonnes-force (88,000 kN) Giga Press. As of December 2023, two 9,000 ton presses were available at GigaTexas to cast Cybertruck rears, while Cybertruck front castings are cast on a 6500-ton press that is shared for casting Model Y frames. Total GigaPresses at Texas were two 9,000 ton plus four of the smaller presses.

==== Fremont ====
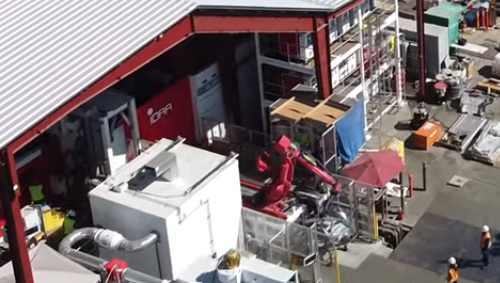
Robot immediately after removing completed Tesla Model Y rear megacasting from Die Casting Machine #1 (DCM1) at Tesla Factory in September 2020

In June 2020, permits for foundations to support the Giga Press at Fremont were issued with Tesla filing permit applications for construction work in preparation for Die-Casting Machine #2 (DCM2) in July 2022. During September 2020 DCM1 started producing trial runs of Model Y castings and DCM2 had been installed.

On 11 March 2021, one of the Fremont presses suffered a fire, caused by molten aluminium igniting hydraulic fluid. No injuries were reported.

==== Germany ====
As of July 2020 plans for Giga Berlin included eight 6,100-tonne-force (60,000 kN) die casting machines. (Located at 52.397°N 13.793°E.)

European Model Y cars have front and rear cast chassis sections. The first two European Giga Press machines were planned to be delivered to Giga Berlin by the start of 2021.

==== Shanghai ====
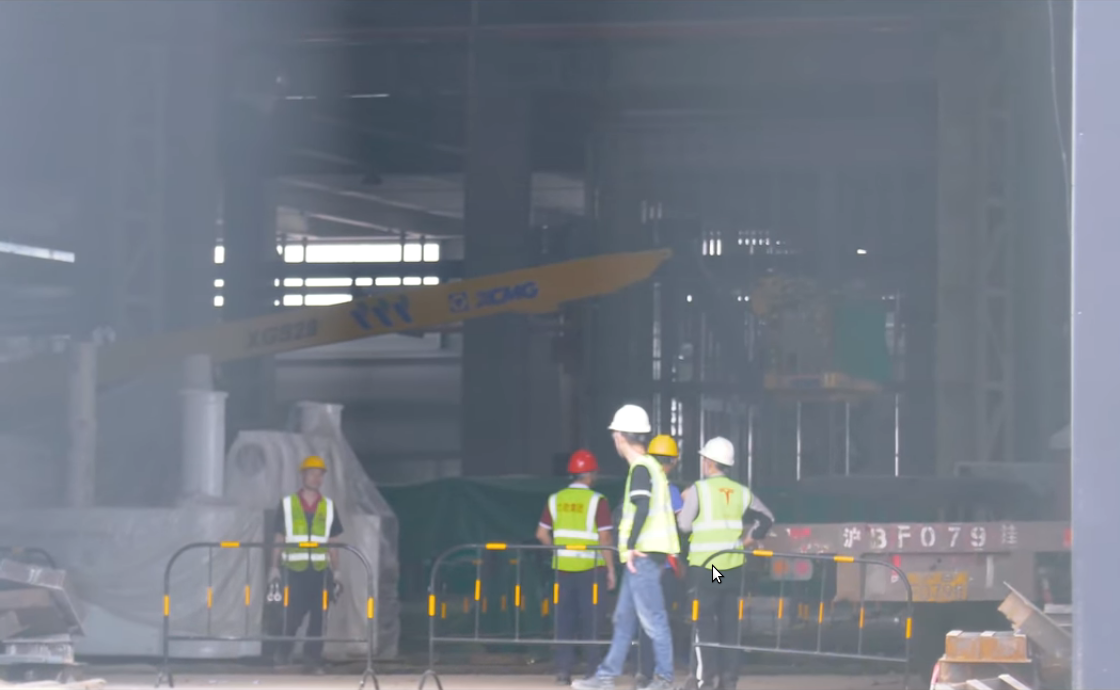
Unloading a compression platten (bottom-left) at Giga Shanghai (July 2020)

By October 2020, three locally made LK Machinery Impress-Plus DCC6000 machines were undergoing assembly for Model Y production. (Located at 30.872°N 121.772°E.) As of October 2021, five machines were available.

==== Texas ====
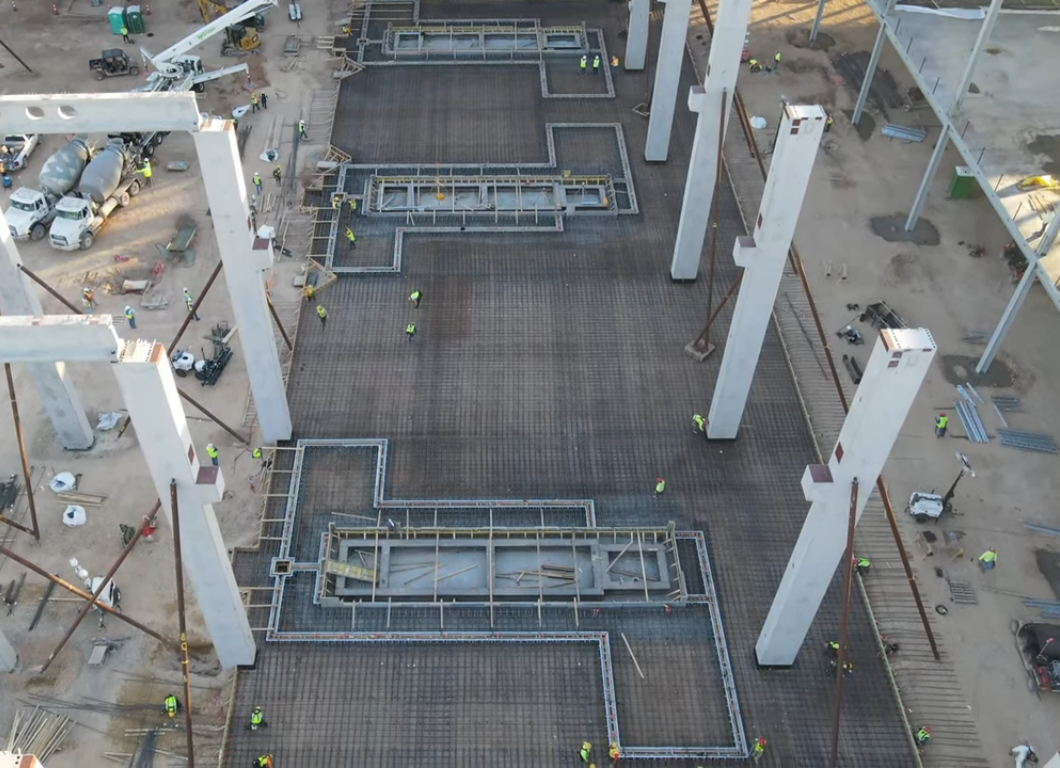
Construction workers preparing three Giga Press foundations at Giga Texas in January 2021

For Tesla Model Y car production at Giga Texas beginning in 2022, Tesla began to deploy a single-piece front in addition to the existing single-piece rear casting.

During the night of 18/19 January 2021, concrete foundations for three Giga Press machines were poured at the Giga Texas factory location near Austin, Texas. (30.22°N 97.617°W)

On 21 January 2021 the first Giga Press components started to arrive on site.

As of 2 February 2021, all major components of the first Giga Press at the Austin site had been craned into place.

On 15 April 2021, components for a second Giga Press started arriving at Giga Texas.

=== Glovitech ===
LK Technology delivered one Impress-Plus DCC 6000 machine for Glovitech of South Korea, installed in the Vân Trung Industrial Zone, Việt Yên, Bắc Giang Province, Vietnam. The machine is used for producing large Faraday cages (radio-frequency enclosures) for 5G mobile base stations. The machine was delivered in December 2020, and produced its first castings in March 2021.

=== Japan ===
In June 2023 Toyota announced that it was adopting large casting technology for its electric vehicles.

In 2023 Japanese auto parts supplier Ryobi announced plans to cast large electric-vehicle body parts and expects to reduce car body manufacturing costs by 20%.

=== Volvo ===
By November 2023, orders had been placed for two 9000-tonnes-force Giga Press machines for a new Volvo electric vehicle factory at Košice, Slovakia.

=== 2.0 ===
In September 2023 Tesla was reported to be considering a single-piece casting for entire underbody of its to-be-announced "small car", an easier task than single-casting their existing, larger models. This required learning how to use larger Giga Press machines, reduce mold design costs, and incorporate hollow subframes. Key innovations include using 3D printing to make cast prototypes with industrial sand.

Making a large metal mold can cost $1.5 million. Typically, multiple iterations and tweaks are required, at great expense.

Binder jet printers build casts out of layers of sand stabilized with a liquid binder at a fraction of the cost of using metal and in a fraction of the time. Hollow elements are created after the cast is made by removing sections of sand added during the casting. Parts cast in sand molds require different aluminium alloys and post-cast processing to meet safety and other requirements. Production casting would continue to use metal casts.

The die cast press would need clamping force of 16,000 tons or more, among the largest in existence (but still significantly lower than a force of forging presses, such as 50,000 ton). This pressure might prevent the use of sand to make hollows. A different type of press would inject molten alloy more slowly that would allow sand cores and produce higher quality castings, although at a slower pace.

In May 2024 Tesla was reported to have put on hold their plans for single-piece casting and sticking with three-piece casting on their current lineup, claimed to be a result of their sales and profits falling.
