= Design with memory =

Approach to sustainable product design and architecture

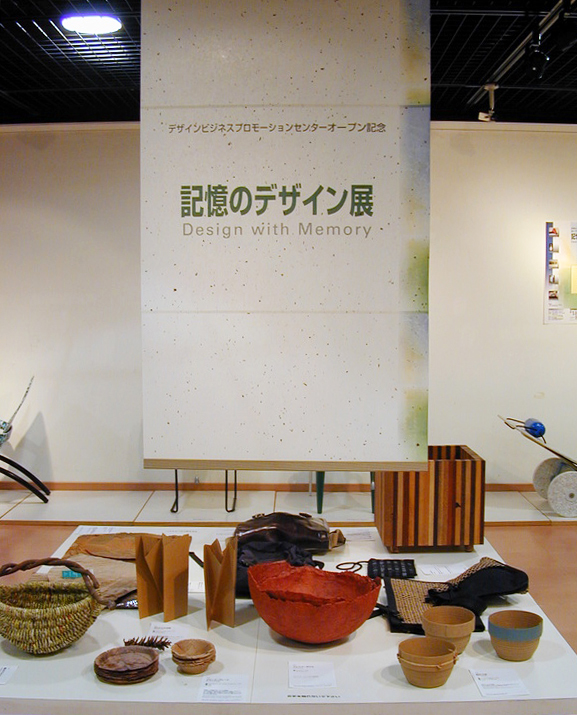
"Design with Memory" exhibition, Japan

Design with Memory (記憶のデザイン, Kioku no dezain) is a value adding approach to sustainable product design and architecture that was developed by Japanese industrial design professional Fumikazu Masuda], professor at Tokyo Zokei University, and American architect Tom Johnson as a design criteria for use in the fifth and sixth rounds of the International Design Resource Awards Competition (IDRA) between 1999-2003. Introduced at the time of rising global sustainability movement in the 1990s, the term proposes a new way of looking at design with recycled, re-used and sustainable materials and identifies four pathways to approach design to achieve this result of added value.

The first mention of the term "Design with Memory" in the U.S. was in the ARCADE magazine (1997). In an article discussing winning entries to the first three rounds of the Competition Architect Johnson said, “We have come to call it 'Designing with Memory' because sustainable design is based on the recognition of our interdependent relationship with the natural world around us – something we forgot when we had designed products and architecture with the idea that their materials could be wasted and landfilled. It is also 'Designing with Memory' because it means thinking about where the materials come from, how they are used, and where they will go next.”

The first mention of the term “Design with Memory“ in Japan was at the Japanese Design Research Center exhibit in Niigata, Japan (1999). With heightening global interest in sustainable development during this time, the DRA competitions organized under the theme of Design with Memory were funded in part by the Japanese Ministry of International Trade and Industry (MITI), and the exhibits in Japan were part of a national program of design education with associated seminars. It is said to be the first international design competition under the theme of sustainability to be sponsored by the Japanese government.

== History ==
Origin of the term

The Design Resource Awards Competition (1994-2003), was begun by Johnson Design Studio with a grant from the State of Washington’s Clean Washington Center with the goal of encouraging the development of commercially viable products made from recycled and sustainably harvested materials. The State of Washington’s pioneering recycling programs were gathering much mixed waste paper, construction debris, plastics, metals and glass, but there were very few products being made with these materials. One of the main challenges to using the materials was their cost - successful new products would need to be of relatively high value. The Competition challenged designers with the problem of making high value products with what were viewed as relatively low quality, low value materials. While the Competition began as a local effort, within the first year over half the entries came from outside the United States and the name was revised to the International Design Resource Awards (IDRA) Competition. The Competition highlighted that such challenge was not unique to Washington State, but was a global issue which many governmental and environmental institutions around the world were looking to solve (see major donor list below). It is believed to be the first international design competition focused on encouraging the development of sustainable product design and architecture.

The core criteria for designer's submissions for IDRA competitions were:

- Contain a high degree of post-consumer recycled content or sustainably harvested material
- Demonstrate the ability to add value to the recycled or sustainable material and to increase its usage
- Be designed for future re-use or recyclability
- Be suitable for commercial production

The Competition was open to student and professional entrants. The award was given out in three categories of student, professional, and honorable mention. Typically the Competition had five jurors from various backgrounds – education, marketing, material sciences, architecture, and product design. Early advocates and supporters of sustainable design from across these disciplines became jurors for the competition. Particularly well-known jurors included Wendy Brawer, Pliny Fisk III, Arunas Oslapas, and Fumikazu Masuda.

The term "Design with Memory" came about after 4th year of the Competition in 1999, when a Japanese journalist Hiroyuki Kushida working on the Whole Earth Project in Tokyo, saw some of the award winners from the first three rounds of the Competition during a trip to U.S., and arranged for an exhibit to travel to Japan. While visiting the first exhibit in Japan, Architect Johnson met Professor Masuda for the first time and discovered that the phrase “sustainable design” translates in Japanese to “design with memory” (記憶のデザイン), and that this phrase also translated well back to English in the ways we thought about sustainable design - "Where do materials come from and where do they go next?” (Johnson interview, Sotokoto 2003) This collaboration subsequently led to a year long series of seminars for professional industrial designers and support for the 5th and 6th rounds of the Competition was provided by the Japanese Ministry of International Trade and Industry (MITI) together with other industry supporters such as Living Design Center OZONE in Tokyo.

From 1994 to 2003 the Competition received over 1200 entries from over 20 countries with the 5th and 6th rounds of the Competition attracting more than 450 entries. The winning entries were published in various design books and magazines around the world. This story of "Spinning garbage into gold" was featured in various fashion and lifestyle magazines such as House Beautiful, Elle Decor, and An-An. It was one of the pioneering initiatives that aimed to position products made from recycled material in an elevated way by exhibiting them in high-end design shops, galleries, and museums.

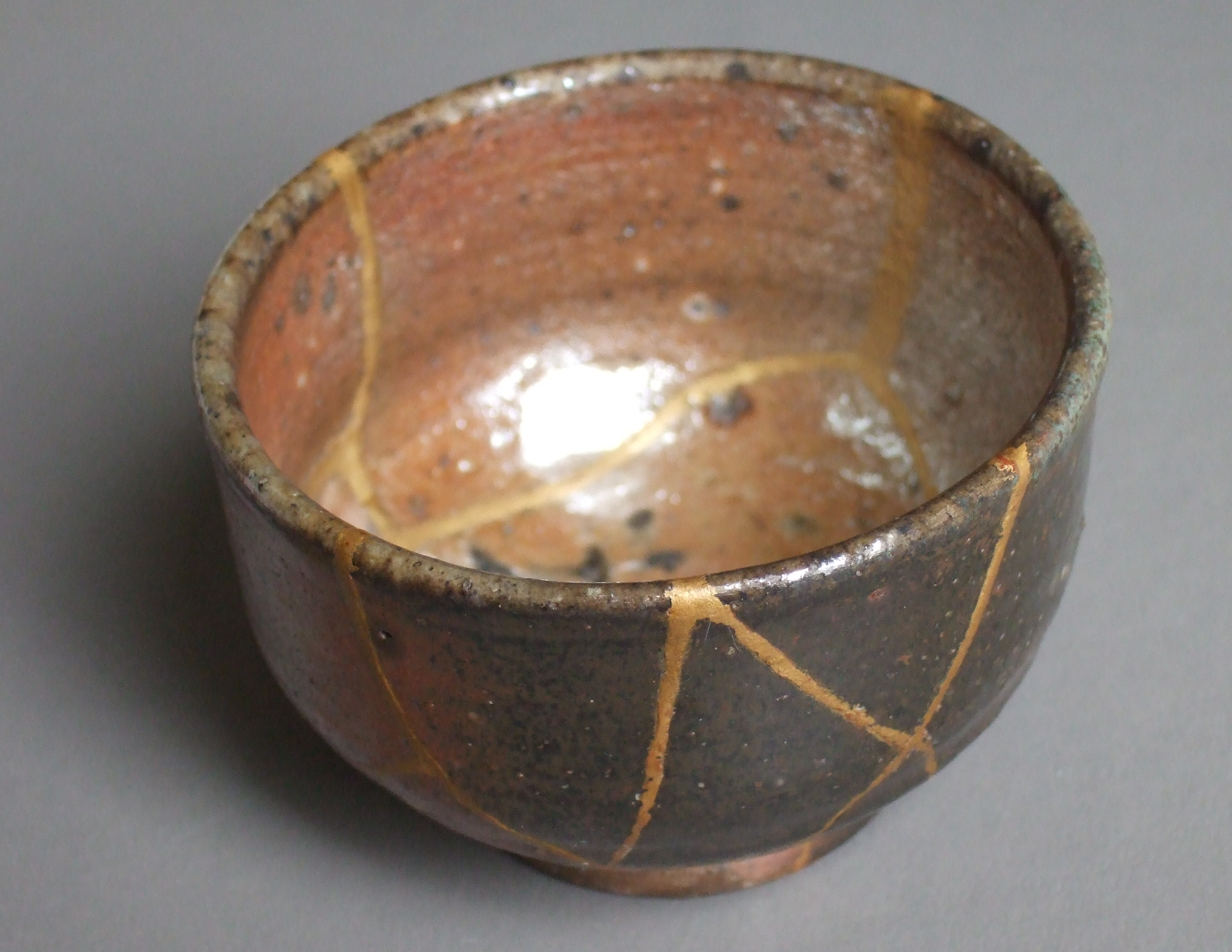
Kintsugi, Japanese art of repairing broken pottery

Origin of the concept

An iconic example used by Professor Masuda and Architect Johnson to illustrate the historical precedent for “Design with Memory” is the ancient Japanese tea cup which has been broken and visibly repaired (also see kintsugi, wabi-sabi). "An 'old' value in eco design can be seen in an ancient Japanese tea ceremony cup that was broken and carefully repaired. This care and attention gives the cup added value as it becomes a cultural icon.”

During the 5th and 6th rounds of the Competition the phrase came to represent a new design methodology for designing with recycled, re-used and sustainably harvested materials. It is based on making elements of the product’s materials and use self-evident, and thereby raising the value of the product for the user. “Through interaction with the entrants and jurors this phrase has grown to include complementary levels of meaning. For example, 'Design with Memory' could mean adding value to a design by employing the memory of the material’s previous use in the new work. It could also mean adding value to the project by actively employing the memory of the user, or, perhaps, the memory of the material or product itself in the new work.”

== Application ==
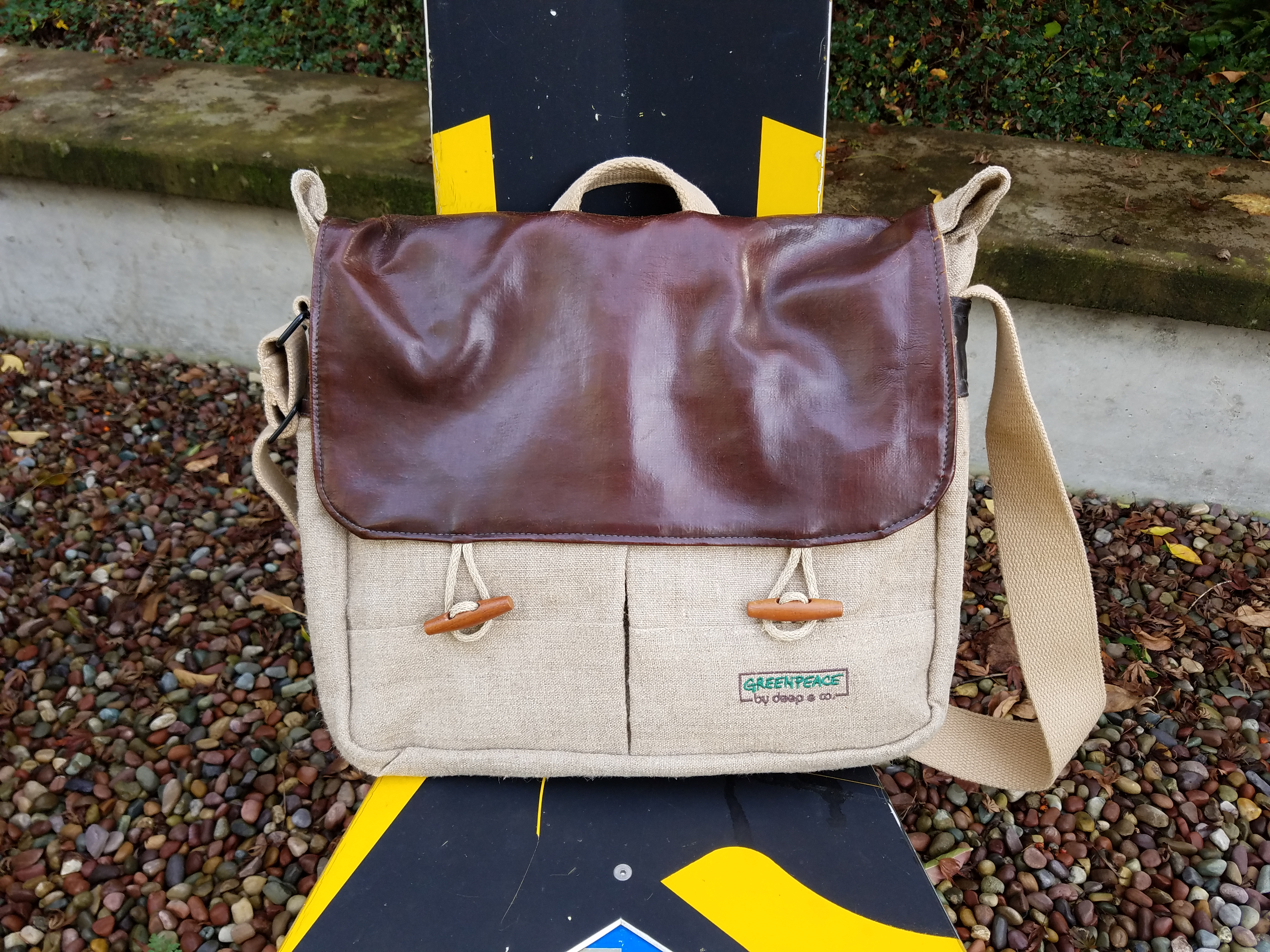
Green Peace Activist Bag "Design with Memory of the User" category award winning example

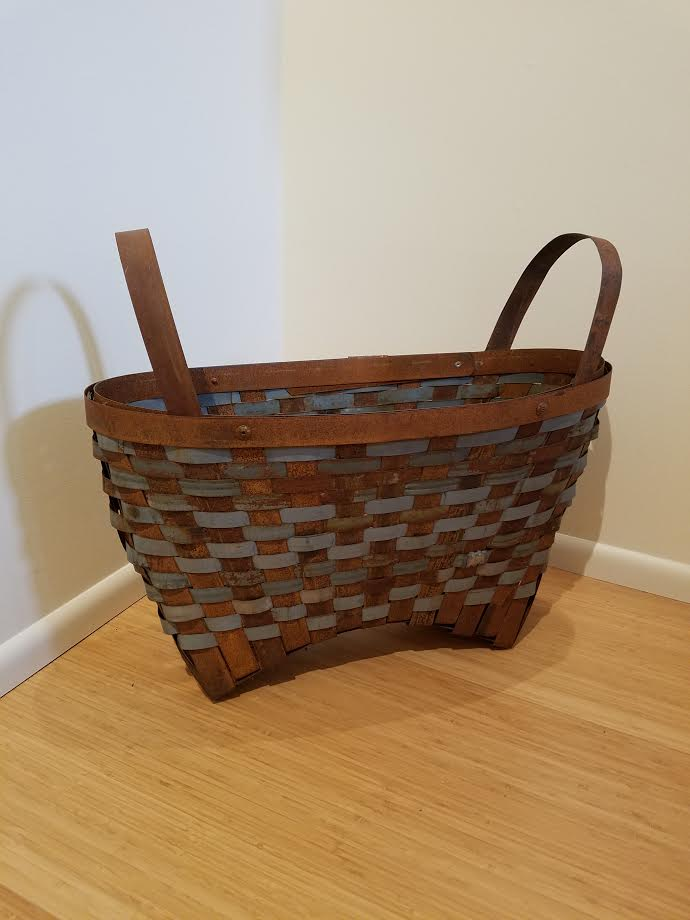
Metal Woven Basket "Design with Memory of the Material" category award winning example

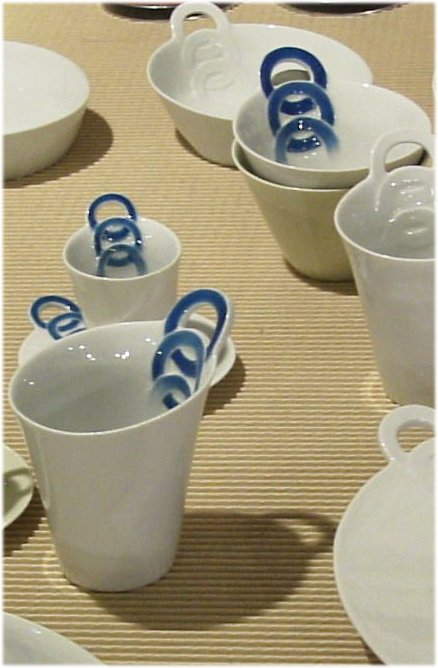
Recycled Porcelain ware "Design with Memory of the Product" category award winning example

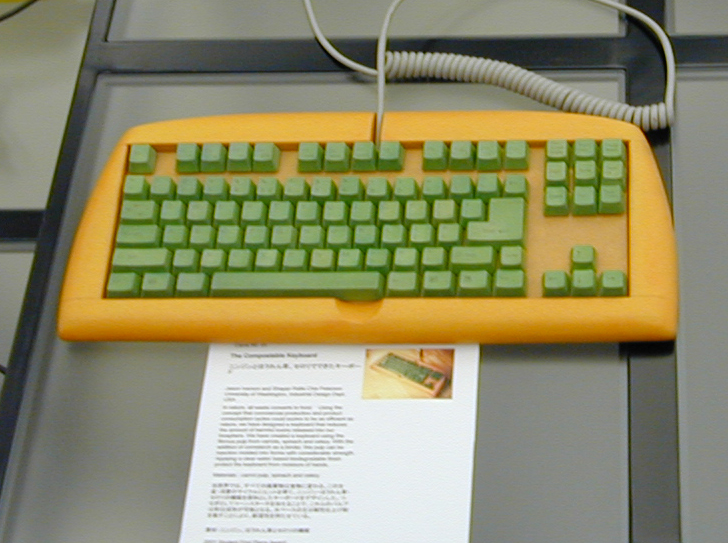
Compostable keyboard "Design with Memory of Nature" category award winning example

The Japanese industrial design professor and American architect duo identified 4 pathways to accomplish Designing with Memory and introduced them as focus categories in the 5th and 6th rounds of IDRA Competition. Each pathway was illustrated through examples of award winning entries from the Competition:

1. Design with Memory of the User - The goal is to reduce the amount of consumption by making products useful and desirable for a longer period of time. The method employed is to develop a strong relationship between the user and the product. A winning entry example of this strategy was the GreenPeace Activist Bag. It used a smoked natural rubber material coated on used sugar sacks made by members of an indigenous community in the Amazon delta as part of a carrier bag. Users knew every day that this product was made to make the native rubber trees more valuable standing than cut down for grazing and thus helping support their local community. All parts of the bag were compostable, so when it did wear out, it could go back into the earth.
2. Design with Memory of the Material –This strategy is for finding successful paths to re-use materials. Materials that are discarded can be a rich resource for new product development. Adding value to the material through artistic design is the key to using them successfully. A winning entry example of this strategy is the elegant baskets woven from discarded industrial metal strapping.
3. Design with Memory of the Product –The goal is to create a cycle of product, and product re-use, into the future. A winning example of this approach is by a porcelain product company that developed a way to regrind discarded and their broken porcelain products and form it into a new product. To illustrate to the purchaser the nature of the product they incorporated their traditional design motifs blended into the new forms.
4. Design with Memory of Nature - The goal with this strategy is to make the product self-evidently integrating with natural cycles. A winning entry example of this strategy is the compostable computer keyboard. Technological advances are rapid and cause plastic products to be “out of date” quickly - leading to increased pressure on recycling programs and landfills. To address this problem, the keyboard keys and body are instead made from carrot and celery fibers bound with a starch based binder – 100% compostable after the electronic sheet and chord are removed.

== Major exhibitions ==
1. Miami Center for Fine Arts, Re(f)use Exhibit including winners from the first International Design Resource Awards Program, 3-22 to 5-26, 1996
2. Washington State Convention Center, Exhibit of winners from the Second International Design Resource Awards Program, July 1996
3. IDEE, Tokyo, Whole Earth Exhibit, First exhibit of commercially available, sustainably designed products in Japan, Feb. 1999
4. Design Resource Core, Design with Memory Exhibit, October, 1999 Niigata, Japan
5. Ozone Living Design Center, Design with Memory Exhibit, Jan.-Feb. 2000, Tokyo, Japan
6. Nopporo Community Center, Design with Memory Exhibit, March 2000, Sapporo, Japan
7. Belfast Waterfront Hall, Design with Memory Exhibit, February 2001, Belfast, Northern Ireland
8. Seattle Art Museum, Design with Memory Exhibition, June, 2001, Seattle, WA, USA
9. Washington Convention Center, National Recycling Convention, Jan., 2002, Seattle, WA, USA
10. First China International Design Festival, November 15–17, Qingdao, China
11. Design Resource Core, Design with Memory Exhibit, Sept, 2003, Niigata, Japan
12. Jacob Javits Center, International Contemporary Furniture Fair, May, 2003 New York, NY, USA

== Major Donors ==
1. State of Washington, Clean Washington Center, USA
2. UK Design Directorate, UK
3. Craiganon Industrial Development Organization, Northern Ireland
4. ENFO, Dublin, Republic of Ireland
5. Japanese Ministry of Trade and Economic Development, Japan
6. Phoebe Haas Charitable Trust, USA
7. Arango Design Foundation, USA
8. Eco-Design Institute, Tokyo, Japan
