= List of MythBusters episodes =

MythBusters is a science entertainment TV program created and produced by Australia's Beyond Television Productions for the Discovery Channel.

There is no consistent system for organizing MythBusters episodes into seasons. The show did not follow a consistent calendar of on- and off-air periods for its first-aired episodes. The official MythBusters website at one point sorted episodes by calendar year, but as of 2024, sorts them into 19 seasons (with the first being the three pilots). When the series was released on DVD, some seasons followed calendar years while others did not. This list follows the calendar year as formerly posted on the Discovery website, and the only objective basis for breaking up "seasons".

Including Specials and the revival series, a total of 296 episodes of MythBusters have aired so far.

== Series overview ==
Season	Episodes	Originally released	
Season	Episodes	First released	Last released
Pilots	3	January 23, 2003	March 7, 2003
2003	8	September 23, 2003	December 12, 2003
2004	17	January 11, 2004	December 22, 2004
2005	26	February 2, 2005	November 16, 2005
2006	28	January 11, 2006	December 13, 2006
2007	25	January 10, 2007	December 12, 2007
2008	20	January 16, 2008	November 19, 2008
2009	23	April 8, 2009	December 28, 2009
2010	24	January 4, 2010	December 22, 2010
2011	22	April 6, 2011	November 30, 2011
2012	21	March 25, 2012	November 25, 2012
2013	11	May 1, 2013	October 17, 2013
2014	15	January 4, 2014	August 21, 2014
2015	14	January 10, 2015	September 5, 2015
2016	12	January 2, 2016	March 6, 2016
2017	6	November 15, 2017	December 20, 2017
2018	8	January 3, 2018	February 28, 2018 (UK)
Specials	13	March 21, 2004	May 1, 2013

== Episode list ==
=== Pilot episodes ===
No. overall	No. in season	Title	Original release date	Overall episode No.
P1	Special–1	"Jet-Assisted Chevy"	January 23, 2003	1
Myths tested: Can a 1967 Chevy take off with JATO rockets, like in the tale of the JATO Rocket Car? Can Pop Rocks and soda, when eaten simultaneously, cause the eater's stomach to rupture? Note: The only cast are Adam Savage and Jamie Hyneman. Heather Joseph-Witham also makes her first appearance in this episode.
P2	Special–2	"Biscuit Bazooka"	January 23, 2003	2
Myths tested: Can an airplane toilet create enough suction to cause a person to become stuck on it? Can a can of biscuit dough explode in a hot car? Can a person throw himself through a skyscraper window? Note: This is the first appearance of Kari Byron.
P3	Special–3	"Poppy-Seed Drug Test"	March 7, 2003	3
Myths tested: Can a person take to the skies using only a lawn chair and weather balloons? Can someone test positive for heroin by eating a large number of poppy seeds? Can being painted with gold paint actually be deadly? Note: "Larry Lawn Chair Balloon" was the first myth the team ever tested.

=== 2003 season ===
No. overall	No. in season	Title	Original release date
4	1	"Exploding Toilet"	September 23, 2003
Myths tested: Can a person be propelled off a toilet seat by dropping a lit cigarette into a toilet bowl when filled with various combustible materials? Is running better than walking to keep dry in the rain? Is it possible to make a "magic bullet" out of ice?
5	2	"Cell Phone Destroys Gas Station"	October 3, 2003
Myths tested: Will using a cell phone near a gas pump cause an explosion? Will silicone breast implants explode or expand in low pressure? Can a standard CD-ROM drive shatter a CD?
6	3	"Barrel of Bricks"	October 10, 2003
Myths tested: Can a bricklayer hoisting a wooden barrel full of bricks with a pulley from the top of a three-story building fall and hit a man multiple times? Can a person be electrocuted by urinating on the third rail? Can an eel skin wallet erase a credit card?
7	4	"Penny Drop"	October 17, 2003
Myths tested: Will a penny dropped from the top of the Empire State Building kill a person or penetrate the ground? Can a person's internal organs be cooked by a tanning booth? Can tooth fillings receive radio waves?
8	5	"Buried Alive"	October 24, 2003
Myths tested: How long can you survive in an underground coffin? Does Cola have special properties? If a person is falling off a bridge, can they save themselves by throwing a hammer ahead of them to break the surface tension of the water prior to their own impact?
9	6	"Lightning Strikes/Tongue Piercings"	November 11, 2003
Myths tested: Is a person with a tongue piercing more likely to get struck by lightning? Can a cannon be built out of a tree? Can the breathalyzer be beaten through various methods?
10	7	"Stinky Car"	December 5, 2003
Myths tested: Can a car in which a person has died and started to decay become so malodorous that it will be impossible to remove the stench and sell? If gasoline is poured down a drain pipe and lit while a person is inside of it, will that person be launched as if from a cannon?
11	8	"Alcatraz Escape"	December 12, 2003
Myths tested: Was it possible to survive an escape from Alcatraz? Does a duck's quack echo? Does the government implant secret chips in people which stud finders can detect?

=== 2004 season ===
No. overall	No. in season	Title	Original release date
12	1	"Explosive Decompression"	January 11, 2004
Myths tested: Can a bullet cause explosive decompression and tear a plane apart? Can a car's rear axle be ripped away by a steel cable tied to it and a lamppost? Will a bullet used as a fuse in a vehicle work and then will it fire?
13	2	"Chicken Gun"	January 18, 2004
Myths tested: Do frozen chickens cause more damage than thawed chickens when shot at a plane's windshield? Can octopus eggs hatch inside a human's stomach? Is there any truth to the strange story of a man who died when he tried to compact his laundry in the washing machine by standing on it?
14	3	"Breakstep Bridge"	January 25, 2004
Myths tested: Can a marching battalion take down a bridge? How many bacteria reside on a toothbrush? Is it possible to water ski behind a rowing eight?
15	4	"Sinking Titanic"	February 22, 2004
Myths tested: Could the sinking Titanic literally suck a person down with it? Does a goldfish's memory last for only 3 seconds? Can explosives packed in a trombone cause the slide to rocket off it?
16	5	"Buried in Concrete"	February 25, 2004
Myths tested: Is Jimmy Hoffa buried under Giants Stadium? Can the venom from a daddy long-legs kill a human? Can a jet engine launch a taxi into the air?
17	6	"Myths Revisited"	June 8, 2004
Myths tested: Can a marching battalion take down a bridge? (Revisit of: Breakstep Bridge); Is it possible to make a "magic bullet" out of ice? (Revisit of: Magic Bullet); Do frozen chickens cause more damage than thawed chickens when shot at a plane's windshield? (Revisit of: Chicken Gun); Will using a cell phone near a gas pump cause an explosion? (Revisit of: Cell Phone Destruction); Can being painted with gold paint actually be deadly? (Revisit of: Goldfinger); Can leaving a can of aerosol spray or cola inside a hot car cause it to explode? Can an inflatable brassiere explode inside of an airplane as it climbs in altitude? Can urinating on an electric fence cause electrocution? Note: This is the first appearance of Tory Belleci, Scottie Chapman, and "Mythtern" Christine Chamberlain.
18	7	"Scuba Diver and Car Capers"	July 27, 2004
Myths tested: Can a scuba diver be sucked up in a firefighting helicopter? Are various car myths from movies true?
19	8	"Ancient Death Ray"	September 29, 2004
Myths tested: Can mirrors be used to make a death ray? What solutions are effective against skunk smell? What common objects are bulletproof?
20	9	"Elevator of Death, Levitation Machine"	October 6, 2004
Myths tested: Can someone survive a multi-story elevator fall by jumping right before the elevator hits the bottom of the shaft? Is it possible to make a hovercraft with a vacuum motor? Note: This is the final appearance of folklorist Heather Joseph-Witham.
21	10	"Beat the Radar Detector"	October 13, 2004
Myths tested: If someone falls off a building, can that person glide to safety using a sheet of plywood? Can you beat a radar detector?
22	11	"Quicksand"	October 20, 2004
Myths tested: Can a person be sucked down by "killer quicksand"? Can a tattoo explode in an MRI scan? Can appliances really electrocute people if they fall in the bathtub?
23	12	"Exploding Jawbreaker"	October 27, 2004
Myths tested: Can a superheated jawbreaker explode when bitten down upon? Can a PVC pipe build enough static electricity to kill? Can a playing card kill a person if thrown with enough power?
24	13	"Pingpong Rescue"	November 3, 2004
Myths tested: How many balloons are needed to lift a 40-lb child off the ground? Can a sunken boat be lifted to the surface with ping-pong balls?
25	14	"Boom-Lift Catapult"	November 10, 2004
Myths tested: Is it possible to make a catapult with a boom lift? Does a person save more gas by driving with the AC on instead of having the windows down?
26	15	"Exploding House"	November 16, 2004
Myths tested: Can too many bug bombs blow up a house? How hard is it to find a needle in a haystack? Will talking to plants help them grow?
27	16	"Ming Dynasty Astronaut"	December 5, 2004
Myths tested: Can a person be launched by rockets strapped to a chair, like in the Ming Dynasty tale? Do free energy devices seen on the Internet actually work? Can jumping into a ceiling fan cause a person to lose his head?
28	Special–1	"Viewers-Choice/Christmas Special"	December 22, 2004
Myths tested: Can a frozen turkey explode if it is dropped into deep fryer pot too fast? If you place a silver spoon in a bottle of champagne, will the bubbles last longer? Can a falling icicle kill someone? Does a clothed snowman melt slower than a "naked" one? Can a urine stream freeze in the winter? Can lighting a fire in the fireplace with a chimney make the rest of the house colder? Note: This is a special episode.

=== 2005 season ===
No. overall	No. in season	Title	Original release date
29	Special–1	"Buster Special"	February 2, 2005
Buster is rebuilt after sustaining a year's worth of abuse. Note: This is a special episode.
30	Special–2	"Ultimate MythBusters"	February 9, 2005
Jamie and Adam have a contest to prove who is the Ultimate MythBuster. Note: This is a special episode.
31	1	"Brown Note"	February 16, 2005
Myths tested: Can a person be blown away by a bullet? Can a certain note make a person have fecal incontinence? Does Chinese water torture work?
32	2	"Salsa Escape"	February 23, 2005
Myths tested: Can a person escape from prison using salsa? Can hardened cement be removed from a cement truck using explosives?
33	3	"Exploding Port-a-Potty"	March 2, 2005
Myths tested: Can a car pole-vault from its drive shaft if it hits a pothole? Can a port-a-potty gather enough methane to explode?
34	4	"Is Yawning Contagious?"	March 9, 2005
Myths tested: Can a toy car beat a Dodge Viper in a quarter-mile downhill race? Is yawning contagious? Does buttered toast always land buttered-side down?
35	Special–3	"MythBusters Outtakes"	March 16, 2005
This episode showed outtakes from the series. Note: This is a special episode.
36	5	"Cooling a Six-Pack"	March 23, 2005
Myths tested: What is the fastest way to cool a six-pack of beer? Was a battery able to be used for certain tasks in ancient times?
37	6	"Son of a Gun"	March 30, 2005
Myths tested: Could using a phone in a thunderstorm result in being electrocuted? Could a bullet pass through a man's genitals, into a woman's abdomen, and make the woman pregnant? Can a boat be driven with its trailer still attached? Note: This is the final regular episode appearance of Scottie Chapman and final appearance of "Mythtern" Christine Chamberlain.
38	Special–4	"Shop 'til You Drop"	April 6, 2005
The MythBusters showed their favorite places to shop. Note: This is a special episode.
39	Special–5	"MythBusters Revealed"	April 27, 2005
This is a behind the scenes insight of MythBusters, featuring interviews, as well as exploring personal issues between the hosts. Note: This is a special episode.
40	Special–6	"Hollywood on Trial"	May 11, 2005
Myths tested: Will bullets spark when ricocheting off other objects? Did the aluminium paint used on Buddy Ebsen, the actor originally slated to play the Tin Man in the 1939 movie version of The Wizard of Oz cause an adverse reaction that hospitalized him? Is it possible for a medium-to-large build man to break through a wooden door frame on his own power? Is it possible to be thrown through a glass window and walk away without a scratch? Is it possible to ignite a pool of gasoline using only a cigarette? Note: This is a special episode. It was the first appearance of Grant Imahara.
41	7	"Breaking Glass"	May 18, 2005
Myths tested: Can an unamplified human voice shatter a wine glass? Does a rolling stone gather moss? Can a vacuum cleaner be converted into a jet engine?
42	8	"Jet Pack"	June 9, 2005
Myths tested: Can a jet pack be created from plans on the Internet? Do pyramids have special powers?
43	9	"Killer Brace Position"	June 22, 2005
Myths tested: Is the brace position recommended in airplane crashes actually designed to kill people? Is driving while talking on the cell phone as dangerous as driving drunk?
44	10	"Bulletproof Water"	July 13, 2005
Myths tested: Will diving underwater protect a person from bullets? Can a person swing 360° on a swing set?
45	Special–7	"Jaws Special"	July 17, 2005
Myths tested: Will a scuba tank explode if shot? Can piano wire be used to catch a shark? Can a shark ram through a boat or shark cage? Can a shark hold three flotation barrels under water? Note: This is a special double-length episode. It was a Jaws-themed episode.
46	11	"Border Slingshot"	July 27, 2005
Myths tested: Is it possible to slingshot a person over the border and onto a mattress?
47	12	"Killer Tissue Box"	August 3, 2005
Myths tested: Can a tissue box in the back of a car kill the driver if the car crashes? Is it possible to split an arrow by hitting it with another?
48	13	"Escape Slide Parachute"	August 10, 2005
Myths tested: Can a person make a parachute with an airplane escape slide or life raft? Will hair cream explode in the right conditions and decapitate the pilot of a fighter plane? Can a stewardess survive a 33,000-foot fall while still strapped into her seat?
49	14	"MythBusters Revisited"	October 12, 2005
Myths tested: Can a person be blown away by a bullet? (Revisit of: Blown Away); Can a bullet cause explosive decompression and tear a plane apart? (Revisit of: Explosive Decompression); Is running better than walking to keep dry in the rain? (Revisit of: Who Gets Wetter?); If someone falls off a building, can that person glide to safety using a sheet of plywood? (Revisit of: Plywood Builder); Does a person save more gas by driving with the AC on instead of having the windows down? (Revisit of: AC vs. Windows Down); Can a gas tank explode when shot by a bullet? (Revisit of: Car Capers); Will a black car heat faster than a white one?
50	15	"Chinese Invasion Alarm"	October 19, 2005
Myths tested: Could the Ancient Chinese have used drums to listen for tunneling invaders? Is the five second rule true?
51	16	"Confederate Rocket"	October 26, 2005
Myths tested: Did the Confederates really have a two-stage rocket capable of traveling 100 miles from Richmond to DC?
52	17	"Vodka Myths"	November 2, 2005
Myths tested: Can two semi-trucks collide head-on and completely crush a compact car? Can vodka cure foot odor or bad breath?
53	18	"Steel Toe-Cap Amputation"	November 9, 2005
Myths tested: Do steel toe boots really put toes in more danger than a regular boot, to the extent that the steel toe would chop off the wearer's toes? Can bottle rockets be used to launch a human?
54	19	"Seasickness – Kill or Cure"	November 16, 2005
Myths tested: What is the best cure for seasickness? Is it more efficient to drive a truck with its tailgate up than down? Can sticking one's finger in a gun barrel stop a bullet?

=== 2006 season ===
No. overall	No. in season	Title	Original release date	Overall episode No.
44	1	"Paper Crossbow"	January 11, 2006	55
Myths tested: Can a deadly crossbow be made from materials available to prison inmates? Can vodka remove the smell of cigarettes from clothes, kill bees like an insecticide, or be used as a bathroom cleaner?
45	2	"Shredded Plane"	January 18, 2006	56
Myths tested: What caused a plane to be shredded? Can a fire be started by rubbing sticks together, with a bullet, or with ice?
46	3	"Archimedes Death Ray"	January 25, 2006	57
Myths tested: Can an array of bronze mirrors set a wooden ship on fire? (Revisit of: Ancient Death Ray); Note: This is the first appearance of "Mythtern" Jess Nelson.
47	4	"Helium Football"	February 1, 2006	58
Myths tested: Can a football fly farther if it is filled with helium? Is it possible for a human to catch a bullet in his teeth?
48	5	"Franklin's Kite"	March 8, 2006	59
Myths tested: Could a kite struck by lightning in a storm kill the person holding it? Are various flatulence myths true?
49	6	"Cell Phones on Planes"	March 15, 2006	60
Myths tested: Can a cell phone cause a plane to crash? Can a person fly away on a raft filled with helium?
50	7	"Bullets Fired Up"	April 19, 2006	61
Myths tested: Can a bullet fired straight up in the air kill someone on the way back down? Can vodka cure poison oak and remove band-aids painlessly? If low-end vodka is charcoal-filtered, will it become a top-shelf vodka?
51	8	"Myths Re-Opened"	April 26, 2006	62
Myths tested: Is it possible to split an arrow by hitting it with another? (Revisit of: Splitting an Arrow); Can a hybrid rocket be propelled with salami? Can a modern firearm be fired if completely submerged in water?
52	9	"Mind Control"	May 3, 2006	63
Myths tested: Can mind control be achieved by various techniques? Can a room be painted with dynamite?
53	10	"Exploding Pants"	May 10, 2006	64
Myths tested: Is it possible for pants to spontaneously explode? Do various fuel efficiency methods work?
54	11	"Crimes and Myth-Demeanors 1"	July 12, 2006	65
Myths tested: Can a laser alarm be defeated? Can a metal duct be stealthily climbed using magnets? Can a pressure switch be defeated? How easy is it to crack a safe? Can a hole be easily cut into a pane of glass without setting off a sound alarm?
55	12	"Steam Cannon"	July 19, 2006	66
Myths tested: Did Archimedes make a cannon using steam power? Is a cardboard cereal box more nutritious than the sugary cereal inside?
56	13	"Whirlpool/Snowplow"	July 26, 2006	67
Myths tested: Can a whirlpool really kill somebody? Can a snowplow driving down the road push enough air to flip a passing car over?
57	14	"Mentos and Soda"	August 9, 2006	68
Myths tested: Why does dropping Mentos into a bottle of Diet Coke create a geyser effect? Can a stamp affixed to a helicopter's rotor blade make it crash?
58	15	"Shattering Subwoofer"	August 16, 2006	69
Myths tested: Can speaker power alone destroy a car? Will driving faster on a bumpy road smooth out the ride?
59	16	"Crimes and Myth-Demeanors 2"	August 23, 2006	70
Myths tested: Can fingerprint scanners, sonar, or thermal alarms be foiled? Can a glass re-locking safe be blown up by filling it with water?
60	17	"Earthquake Machine"	August 30, 2006	71
Myths tested: Can a machine designed by Nikola Tesla actually create a miniature earthquake or collapse a structure? Can a lava lamp explode if heated on the stove?
61	18	"Deadly Straw"	September 6, 2006	72
Myths tested: Can a hurricane blow a piece of straw through a tree? According to Primary Perception, do all living things share an interconnected consciousness?
SP9	Special–1	"Mega Movie Myths"	September 13, 2006	73
Myths tested: Can shooting locks really open a door? Can a car be fitted with an ejection seat? Can a car drive up a ramp, fly through the air, land, and drive away? Can a person shoot a hole through a floor and fall through? Will awnings help break a fall from a building? Can a sword cut another sword in half? Note: This is a special double-length episode.
62	19	"Killer Cable Snaps"	October 11, 2006	74
Myths tested: If a steel cable under high tension snaps, could it cut a human in half? Can sounds and vibrations be recorded into the grooves of ancient pottery?
63	20	"Air Cylinder Rocket"	October 18, 2006	75
Myths tested: Can an air cylinder go straight through a cinder-block wall or propel a boat? Can an engine run on gunpowder alone?
64	21	"More Myths Revisited"	October 25, 2006	76
Myths tested: Can a hybrid rocket be propelled with salami? (Revisit of: Salami Rocket); Is it more efficient to drive a truck with its tailgate up than down? (Revisit of: Tailgate Up vs. Tailgate Down); Can a sword slice a machine gun barrel? Can bracing a windshield keep it from shattering? Does a plastic mesh tailgate provide superior fuel efficiency compared to the standard metal tailgate?
65	22	"Exploding Lighter"	November 1, 2006	77
Myths tested: Can a disposable lighter explode with lethal force? Are various gunslinger myths true?
66	23	"Concrete Glider"	November 8, 2006	78
Myths tested: Can a working glider be made out of concrete? Can a passing train suck a person onto the tracks?
67	24	"Firearms Folklore"	November 29, 2006	79
Myths tested: Can a bullet travel through a sniper's scope and kill him? Can a fired bullet lodge in the chamber of a revolver? Can two colliding bullets fuse in mid air? If two metal hammers are struck together, will they explode?
68	25	"Anti-Gravity Device"	December 6, 2006	80
Myths tested: Is anti-gravity possible? Can too many lights on a Christmas tree cause it to light on fire? Can vodka help to ease the pain of a jellyfish sting?
SP10	Special–2	"Holiday Special"	December 6, 2006	81
Myths tested: Can a falling frozen turkey break a person's foot or kill a pet? Can a turkey be cooked by exposing it to a radar or microwave transmitter antenna? Do various methods work keeping the needles of a Christmas tree from falling off? Can a holiday-themed Rube Goldberg machine be built within a week's time? Note: This is a special episode. This is the first episode to air the new opening sequence and to film in high definition.
69	26	"22,000-Foot Fall"	December 13, 2006	82
Myths tested: Is it possible to survive a 22,000-foot fall using the blast from a 1000-pound bomb to break the fall? Is electricity saved by switching off the lights when leaving a room?

=== 2007 season ===
No. overall	No. in season	Title	Original release date	Overall episode No.
70	1	"Hindenberg Mystery"	January 10, 2007	83
Myths tested: Was the Hindenburg disaster actually caused by the doping compound with which the LZ 129 Hindenburg was painted? Can running in a zigzag line save a person from a crocodile?
71	2	"Pirate Special"	January 17, 2007	84
Myths tested: Can a person jab a knife in a boat's sail, ride down the sail, and land safely on the deck? Does an eyepatch help someone see in the dark? Are the splinters made by a cannonball fired at wood more lethal than the cannonball itself? Can rum be used to clean cloth? Note: This is a special double-length episode.
72	3	"Underwater Car"	January 24, 2007	85
Myths tested: How can someone escape from a sinking car? Can paper be folded in half more than seven times?
73	4	"Speed Cameras"	March 7, 2007	86
Myths tested: Is it possible to beat a speed-tracking camera? Can a defibrillator cause nitroglycerin patches to explode?
74	5	"Dog Myths"	March 14, 2007	87
Myths tested: Is there any way to prevent a bloodhound from tracking one's scent? Is it possible to get past a guard dog? Can an old dog be taught new tricks?
75	6	"More Myths Revisited" "More Myths Reopened"	March 21, 2007	88
Myths tested: Can explosives packed in a trombone cause the slide to rocket off it? (Revisit of: The Mad Trombonist); Can a bullet travel through a sniper's scope and kill him? (Revisit of: Firearms Folklore); Can sticking one's finger in a gun barrel stop a bullet? (Revisit of: Finger in a Barrel); If two metal hammers are struck together, or a hammer strikes an anvil, can they shatter with lethal force? (Revisit of: Hammer vs. Hammer); Can a rifle fired with a boresight in the barrel backfire and explode, creating a cartoon-like banana peel effect?
76	7	"Voice Flame Extinguisher"	April 11, 2007	89
Myths tested: Can a human voice extinguish a flame? Can hypnotists plant suggestions in unwilling patients? Can hypnosis help bring back dormant memories?
77	8	"Birds in a Truck"	April 18, 2007	90
Myths tested: Do birds flying in a trailer cause the trailer to become lighter? Will a boat crashing into a channel marker cleave itself in half?
78	9	"Walking on Water"	April 25, 2007	91
Myths tested: Is it possible to walk on water? Can a speeding arrow be snatched out of the air? Can a sword be stopped with one's bare hands?
79	10	"Western Myths"	May 30, 2007	92
Myths tested: Can someone's hat be shot off? Is it possible to break someone out of jail with horses? Can an airbag turn a lock-pick into a lethal spear?
80	11	"Big Rig Myths"	June 6, 2007	93
Myths tested: Can a big rig's tire explode with deadly force? Can fuel be saved by tailgating a semi-trailer truck? Can a car be driven onto a truck's extended ramp at highway speeds?
81	12	"Grenades and Guts"	June 13, 2007	94
Myths tested: Can sacrificially jumping on a grenade save others' lives? Does self-hypnosis work? Can a combination of Diet Coke and Mentos make one's stomach explode?
82	13	"Snow Special"	June 20, 2007	95
Myths tested: Can yodeling actually set off an avalanche? Do cars have better traction on ice while driving backwards? Note: This is a special episode.
83	14	"Baseball Myths"	August 8, 2007	96
Myths tested: Can a baseball be hit hard enough to remove its covering? Can dry balls be hit farther than humid ones? Does sliding into a base get a person there faster? Can balls be hit further with a corked bat? Note: Roger Clemens was a special guest on this episode.
84	15	"Viewers' Special"	August 15, 2007	97
Myths tested: Can a person's eyes pop out while sneezing with eyes open? Can shifting to reverse stop a runaway car? Can three cigarette butts fired from a black-powder rifle kill a person at 7 ft? Note: This is a special episode.
85	16	"Red Rag to a Bull"	August 22, 2007	98
Myths tested: Are bulls really aggravated by the color red? Can ammunition stored in the oven be lethal? Can firearm cartridges thrown in a campfire kill a person? Do bulls in a china shop really cause complete destruction?
86	17	"Superhero Hour"	August 29, 2007	99
Myths tested: Is it possible to climb a building with a motorized grappling hook? Will getting punched by someone wearing a ring leave a ring-shaped imprint? Can a costume be changed in a phone booth? Is it possible to rig a grappling hook onto a car, shoot it at a steel structure, and use it to swing around a 90° corner at high speed?
87	18	"Myth Revolution"	September 5, 2007	100
Myths tested: Can the speed camera be beaten? (Revisit of: Speed Cameras); Can a ninja deflect a bullet with his palm? Can a person breathe from a car tire underwater? Will an RFID chip explode in an MRI scanner?
88	19	"Trailblazers"	October 31, 2007	101
Myths tested: Will a flaming trail of gasoline from a moving vehicle catch up to its tank and cause it to explode? Can a person outrun a trail of burning gunpowder? Can a person be burned by a defibrillator if wearing an underwire bra or a nipple ring?
89	20	"Exploding Water Heater"	November 7, 2007	102
Myths tested: Can a water heater explode like a rocket and shoot through the roof of a house? If a person is being dragged by a horse, can the friction caused by the movement make the jeans catch on fire? Can shrinking jeans by wearing them in a hot bath kill someone?
90	21	"Special Supersized Myths"	November 14, 2007	103
Myths tested: Are sharks attracted by low-frequency sound waves transmitted through water? Does the presence of dolphins deter sharks from attacking their prey? Can the jet exhaust from a Boeing 747 flip a taxi, school bus, or small plane? (Revisit of: Jet Taxi); Can a JATO rocket launch a car through the air? (Revisit of: JATO Car); Can a person waterski behind a cruise ship? Note: This is a double-length episode. Former MythBuster Scottie Chapman reappeared in this episode to assist in the testing.
91	22	"Shooting Fish in a Barrel"	November 21, 2007	104
Myths tested: Is shooting fish in a barrel really as easy as the proverb says? What is the most effective cure for pain caused by hot chili peppers? Are elephants really afraid of mice?
92	23	"Pirates 2"	November 28, 2007	105
Myths tested: Is it possible to use a rowboat as a submarine? Can one escape if buried in the sand up to the neck? What kind of projectiles would pirates use in a cannon if they run out of cannonballs? Note: This is a special episode.
93	24	"Confederate Steam Gun"	December 5, 2007	106
Myths tested: Did the Confederates really build a lethal steam-powered machine gun? Is it possible to fool a modern polygraph test?
94	25	"Airplane Hour"	December 12, 2007	107
Myths tested: Can a person with no flight training safely land a jet airliner while being assisted by the traffic controllers over the radio? If a person jumps out of an airplane with the last parachute, can another person jump out later and catch the person? Is it possible to hold a conversation while falling at terminal velocity? Does a 4,000-foot fall take 90 seconds?

=== 2008 season ===
No. overall	No. in season	Title	Original release date	Overall episode No.
95	1	"James Bond, Part 1"	January 16, 2008	108
Myths tested: Can a bullet from a 9 mm handgun ignite a propane tank? Can a watch-sized electromagnet deflect a bullet? Can a speed boat jump off of a ramp, land in the water, and continue to operate safely? Note: This is a special James Bond-theme episode.
96	2	"Lead Balloon"	January 23, 2008	109
Myths tested: Can a lead balloon fly? Is it possible to surf a wave caused by an explosion?
97	3	"Airplane on a Conveyor Belt"	January 30, 2008	110
Myths tested: Can an airplane take off while on a conveyor belt? Can cockroaches, fruit flies, and flour beetles survive extreme levels of radiation? Can defrosting shaving cream fill up an entire car?
98	4	"James Bond, Part 2"	February 6, 2008	111
Myths tested: Can 007's exploding ballpoint pen blow a test dummy in half? Can a bowler hat rigged with a steel ring knock the head off a statue? Can a steel jaw sever a steel cable? Note: This is a special episode.
99	5	"Viewers' Special 2"	February 13, 2008	112
Myths tested: Can a person slide down a steel cable using a pair of blue jeans? Does eye black help athletes see? Can a spark follow a trail of gunpowder leaking from a barrel, catch up with it, and explode? Can a tree be cut down using a machine gun? Note: This is a special episode. It was the final appearance of "Mythtern" Jess Nelson.
100	6	"MacGyver Myths"	February 20, 2008	113
Myths tested: Can a person blow a man-sized hole in a wall with one gram of sodium reacting with water? Could MacGyver have built an ultralight airplane from bamboo, trash bags, duct tape, and a cement mixer? How well will Jamie and Adam perform in a MacGyver challenge? Note: This is a special episode.
101	7	"Alaska Special"	April 23, 2008	114
Myths tested: Does cabin fever exist? Does accelerating into a moose cause less damage than braking? Can a single stick of dynamite with a 20 second fuse be thrown, retrieved by a dog, and detonate under an SUV causing it to sink into a frozen lake? Note: This is a special episode.
102	8	"Shark Week Special 2"	July 27, 2008	115
Myths tested: Can sharks detect a struggling fish? Do dogs attract sharks? Does chili powder repel sharks? Will a pack of sharks ignore a person who is playing dead? Do spots of light attract sharks? Could a person being attacked by a shark reach its eye while inside its mouth? Note: This is a special double-length episode.
103	9	"Exploding Steak"	August 6, 2008	116
Myths tested: Can steak be tenderized with explosives? Does driving while angry decrease fuel efficiency?
104	10	"NASA Moon Landing"	August 27, 2008	117
Myths tested: Were some of the photos from the Moon landing fake? Can you bounce a laser off the Moon? Was the film from the Moon faked, and just slowed down? Will a feather and a hammer drop at the same rate in a vacuum? Could a footprint be made like the one on the Moon? Could the flag have flapped like it did on the Moon?
105	11	"Viral Hour"	September 3, 2008	118
Myths tested: Is it possible to lift a car using fire hoses? Do goats faint while getting scared? Can "invisible water" be created to make it look as if a tin foil boat is floating in the air? Can a person create a huge fireball by firing a cloud of sawdust and ignite it with a flare?
106	12	"Phone Book Friction"	September 10, 2008	119
Myths tested: Are two interlaced phone books impossible to pull apart by any means? Can a shark be blown up like they did in Deep Blue Sea?
107	13	"Water Stun Gun"	September 17, 2008	120
Myths tested: Can a conventional electric stun gun be turned into a water-powered electric stun gun? Is firewalking real? Can a fire be put out by placing a fire extinguisher into it?
108	14	"Blind Driving"	October 8, 2008	121
Myths tested: Can a blind man drive a car if given instructions by his passenger? Is it better to play through a tree than around it in golf? Can an explosion in a gopher hole cause a golf ball near the edge of the hole to fall in? Does wearing shoes with metal cleats increase one's chances of getting struck by lightning?
109	15	"Ninjas 2"	October 15, 2008	122
Myths tested: Can a ninja catch an arrow mid-flight? (Revisit of: Catching an Arrow); Could a ninja hide underwater, breathing through a bamboo reed, long enough to attack an enemy with a poison blow-dart? Is Bruce Lee's famous one-inch punch really effective? Note: This is a special episode.
110	16	"Alcohol Myths"	October 22, 2008	123
Myths tested: Does drinking alcohol make people look more attractive? Do alleged ways of sobering up really work? Could the ancient Korean Hwacha actually do what is claimed?
111	17	"Motorcycle Flip"	October 29, 2008	124
Myths tested: Will a motorcycle flip if a pole is thrust into the front wheel? Can someone break out of prison with a rope made of toilet paper, human hair, or bedsheets?
112	18	"Coffin Punch"	November 5, 2008	125
Myths tested: What household objects are bulletproof? Once buried alive inside a coffin, is it possible to punch your way through the coffin and dig yourself out?
113	19	"End With a Bang"	November 12, 2008	126
Myths tested: Is it really true that one cannot polish dung? Is hitting the ground with running legs faster than a standing start? Is it really best to end with a bang?
SP12	Special–1	"Viewer Special Threequel"	November 19, 2008	127
Myths tested: Could a torture technique consisting of growing a bamboo through a victim's body have worked? Does dropping alkali metals in a water-filled bathtub result in a huge explosion? Does brandy, such as carried by Saint Bernards, really prevent hypothermia? Does lighting a piano on fire make it explode? Note: This is a special episode.

=== 2009 season ===
No. overall	No. in season	Title	Original release date	Overall episode No.
114	1	"Demolition Derby"	April 8, 2009	128
Myths tested: When a bus is moving at over 50 miles per hour, will moving passengers to the inside of the turn keep the bus from flipping? Will a fruit stand drive through, chain link gate crash, caravan collision, and semi trailer shave leave the driver unharmed and able to continue in a high-speed pursuit? Will a car dropped from 4,000 feet fall faster than a speeding car? Can two big rigs that collide head on completely flatten a compact car between them? Note: This is a double-length special episode.
115	2	"Alaska Special" "Alaska Special 2"	April 15, 2009	129
Myths tested: Is pykrete tougher than ice, bulletproof, and durable enough to make a boat out of? Can a V-shaped snowplow really split a car in two? Note: This is a special episode.
116	3	"Banana Slip/Double-Dip"	April 22, 2009	130
Myths tested: Can a banana peel really cause one to slip? Does double dipping cause germ warfare? Can you really make a homemade diamond?
117	4	"YouTube Special"	April 29, 2009	131
Myths tested: Do match heads alone have the explosive punch to fire a homemade cannon? Can a 7-foot ball of Lego blocks become a rolling weapon of mass destruction? Can a car tire burst into flames if it spins fast enough? Note: This is a special YouTube-themed episode.
118	5	"Swimming in Syrup"	May 6, 2009	132
Myths tested: Can a person swim faster in syrup than in water? Can two targets be hit with one shot by splitting a bullet on an axe blade? Can a steel door be blown open by the gunpowder from six bullets?
119	6	"Exploding Bumper"	May 13, 2009	133
Myths tested: Can a car bumper explode? Did Hungarian archers get twice the penetration shooting a bow from a galloping horse?
120	7	"Seesaw Saga"	May 20, 2009	134
Myths tested: Could a skydiver whose parachute failed to open hit a playground seesaw and send a small girl flying seven stories high, and she could still survive?
121	8	"Thermite vs. Ice"	May 27, 2009	135
Myths tested: Could thermite placed on top of blocks of ice set off an explosion? Could a car stereo set off an SKS rifle? Could a person's thumb be severed while firing a hunting pistol?
122	9	"Prison Escape"	June 3, 2009	136
Myths tested: Could a human hang on to the roof of a speeding car? Can dental floss be used to cut through the steel bars of a prison? Can a prisoner fire the ball from his ball-and-chain via a ceremonial cannon, launch himself over the prison wall, and survive?
123	10	"Curving Bullets"	June 10, 2009	137
Myths tested: Can a sonic shock wave shatter glass? Is it possible to bend bullets around obstacles, like in the movie Wanted?
124	11	"Car vs. Rain"	June 17, 2009	138
Myths tested: Will driving a convertible faster in the rain help a person stay drier than stopping and putting the top on? Can popcorn be cooked with lasers or explosions?
125	12	"Knock Your Socks Off"	October 7, 2009	139
Myths tested: If one bullet is fired horizontally and the other is dropped vertically, simultaneously from the same height, will they hit the ground at the same time? Can someone really be knocked out of their socks?
126	13	"Duct Tape Hour"	October 14, 2009	140
Myths tested: Is it possible to lift a car using nothing but duct tape? Can duct tape plug holes in the bottom of boats? Can you create a working sail-boat out of duct tape? Can duct tape be used to construct a potato cannon instead of glue? Is it possible to build a working cannon using duct tape?
127	14	"Clean Car vs. Dirty Car"	October 21, 2009	141
Myths tested: Does a dirty car get better gas mileage than a clean one? Why are dimples crucial to the flight of golf balls? Is a hangover caused by beer less severe than one caused by a mixture of beer and liquor?
128	15	"Greased Lightning"	October 28, 2009	142
Myths tested: Can a 30-foot fireball be created with an oil pan fire? Does microwaving C-4 cause it to explode? Can cheese fired from a cannon pierce a sail?
129	16	"Hurricane Windows"	November 4, 2009	143
Myths tested: Will opening all of the windows of a house during a hurricane lessen the damage caused to the structure? Will a human head that has been dipped in liquid nitrogen for 5 seconds shatter when slammed into a table? Will a Christmas tree explode if frozen using liquid nitrogen?
130	17	"Crash and Burn"	November 11, 2009 (US); November 2, 2009 (UK)	144
Myths tested: Does a car explode when driven off a cliff? Can a huge rocket launch a cage holding a human, and would the person survive?
131	18	"Myth Evolution"	November 18, 2009	145
Myths tested: Can an exploding water heater pass through the second story of a house? Can a person shoot around a corner accurately using a variety of methods? Can someone hold on to a car while being driven through cardboard boxes? Can liquid nitrogen be used to pick a lock? Can a rocket-powered snowplow split a car in two?
132	19	"Dumpster Diving"	November 25, 2009	146
Myths tested: Can a person jump from a rooftop into a dumpster and walk away? Can a deep-sea diver's body be crushed into his helmet if his air hose breaks? Note: Kari Byron goes on maternity leave and Jessi Combs joins the Build Team as her replacement.
133	20	"Antacid Jail Break"	December 2, 2009	147
Myths tested: Can antacid tablets be used to blow a prison cell open? Can a person drive safely on a moonless night without using his headlights?
134	21	"Unarmed and Unharmed"	December 9, 2009	148
Myths tested: Can a cowboy shoot a gun out of a person's hand without injuring him? Is the 50-foot bus jump seen in Speed possible in real life?
135	22	"Hidden Nasties"	December 16, 2009	149
Myths tested: Can you skip a car over a lake? Is a toilet seat cleaner than other household items?
136	23	"Mini-Myth Mayhem"	December 28, 2009	150
Myths tested: Can you mail a coconut without packaging? Can you light a match with a bullet? Can you make a candle out of earwax? Can you make someone urinate involuntarily by putting their hand in a bowl of warm water while they sleep? Can you make your own gunpowder, shoot it out of a bamboo cannon, and walk away? Can you touch molten lead without burning your skin? Note: This episode is dedicated to Erik Gates, who died in a construction accident unrelated to rocketry.

=== 2010 season ===
No. overall	No. in season	Title	Original release date	Overall episode No.
137	1	"Boomerang Bullet"	January 4, 2010	151
Myths tested: Can you accidentally kill yourself with a bullet that ricochets off three walls? Could a medieval army have used trees to catapult dead bodies over a castle wall?
138	2	"Soda Cup Killer"	March 24, 2010	152
Myths tested: If a cup filled with soda was tossed out the window of a car, would it penetrate the windshield of a passing car, killing the driver? Can you really hang from the edge of a building like in the movies? Note: This is Jessi Combs's final appearance as a member of the Build Team.
139	3	"Dive to Survive"	March 31, 2010	153
Myths tested: Can you escape an explosive shockwave by diving in water? Can you bulletproof a car using nothing but phone books? Note: Kari Byron returns from maternity leave.
140	4	"Spy Car Escape"	April 7, 2010	154
Myths tested: Can an object fired backward from a vehicle moving forward simply fall to the ground? Do the movie spy car tricks to escape a chasing car work?
141	5	"Bottle Bash"	April 14, 2010	155
Myths tested: Is it worse to have an empty beer bottle smashed over your head than a full one? Could ancient armies have used animal hides to build their cannons?
142	6	"No Pain, No Gain"	April 28, 2010	156
Myths tested: Are some types of people more tolerant to pain? Can a BBQ propane tank heat up enough in a fire to launch through a garage roof like a rocket?
143	7	"Mythssion Control"	May 5, 2010	157
Myths tested: Can someone really be knocked out of their socks? (Revisit of: Knock Your Socks Off); Is the force exerted between two cars crashing into each other at 50 mph the same as a single car hitting a wall at 50 mph?
144	8	"Duct Tape Hour 2"	May 12, 2010	158
Myths tested: Can duct tape be used to build a bridge? Can duct tape be used to fix a car? Can duct tape be used to hold a car in place? Can duct tape be used to stop a car going 60 miles per hour? Note: This is a special episode.
145	9	"Waterslide Wipeout"	May 19, 2010	159
Myths tested: Can a person be launched 115 feet into a kiddie pool from a giant waterslide? Can a mail delivery truck taking only right turns save gas?
146	10	"Fireball Stun Gun"	June 2, 2010	160
Myths tested: Does pepper spray, a flannel shirt, and a stun gun cause massive fireball? Can fireworks really launch a person over a lake?
147	11	"Flu Fiction"	June 9, 2010	161
Myths tested: Can a sneeze leave a person's nose at around 100 mph? Can sneeze droplets travel up to 30 ft? Can nasal secretions contaminate a room quickly? Can you be decapitated by a tornado?
SP14	Special–1	"Top 25 Moments"	June 16, 2010	162
The top 25 moments of MythBusters are counted down by the cast with additional comments. Note: This is a special double-length clip-show episode.
148	12	"Hair of the Dog"	October 6, 2010	163
Myths tested: Is there any way to prevent a bloodhound from tracking one's scent? (Revisit of: Foil the Bloodhound); Is it possible to fool a dog trained to sniff out contraband?
149	13	"Storm Chasing Myths"	October 13, 2010	164
Myths tested: Are the Storm Chasers' vehicles fit to withstand force 5 tornado speeds? Is it possible to build a personal tornado protection device? Note: This is a special episode. It is a crossover episode with Storm Chasers and is dedicated to honorary MythBuster Sanjay Singh.
150	14	"Cold Feet"	October 20, 2010	165
Myths tested: When you get "cold feet", do your feet actually get colder? When the poop hits the fan, does everyone get covered in the ensuing chaos?
151	15	"Tablecloth Chaos"	October 27, 2010	166
Myths tested: Can a motorcycle pull a tablecloth out from under a setting for a banquet? Do humans really use only 10% of their brain?
152	16	"Arrow Machine Gun"	November 3, 2010 (US); October 25, 2010 (UK)	167
Myths tested: Did the Greeks create an arrow machine gun that offered the speed, distance, and precision that modern machine guns do? Is driving while tired worse than driving while tipsy?
153	17	"Mini Myth Madness"	November 10, 2010	168
Myths tested: Can a scuba diver wear a tuxedo underneath his drysuit, go underwater, resurface, strip off his scuba gear, and be able to present the tuxedo perfectly? Can a car's tire pressure affect its fuel efficiency? Can a laptop stop a bullet from point-blank range? Can a hair weave stop a .40 caliber bullet? Can a fridge door stop a round of 9mm bullets? Out of using your elbow, using your hand, and using a handkerchief to cover your mouth when you sneeze, which is the best way to limit the spread of germs? Is it easy to take candy from a baby? Can a bottle of beer, when given a sudden shock, turn from a liquid and freeze into a solid?
154	18	"Reverse Engineering"	November 17, 2010 (US); November 8, 2010 (UK)	169
Myths tested: Does a certain 1970s sports car become more aerodynamic if the body is turned backwards? Can a surfboard be launched through the windscreen of a car and be lethal, like in the movie Lethal Weapon 2?
155	19	"Inverted Underwater Car"	November 24, 2010	170
Myths tested: Is it more difficult to escape from a sinking car that flips upside down than from one that remains right-side up? Can a carton of milk keep a pistol's muzzle flash from igniting a room full of flammable gas?
156	20	"Bug Special"	December 1, 2010	171
Myths tested: Can honey bees lift a laptop? Can hitting a bug at high speeds on a motorcycle be fatal? Can hanging a bag of water repel flies?
157	21	"President's Challenge"	December 8, 2010	172
Myths tested: Can mirrors be used to make a death ray? (Revisit of: Ancient Death Ray); Is it possible to make a moving SUV flip end-over-end by punching down on the hood, like in the film Hellboy? Note: President Obama made a special appearance challenging Adam and Jamie to revisit the "Ancient Death Ray" myth.
158	22	"Green Hornet Special"	December 15, 2010	173
Myths tested: Can a buried car use onboard explosives to blast a bulldozer out of the way without injuring the passengers? If a bullet-riddled car gets stuck in a rising elevator, will the ceiling cut it in half, and can the front end be driven away? Note: Seth Rogen makes a special appearance, challenging the cast to replicate two scenes from his film The Green Hornet.
159	23	"Operation Valkyrie"	December 22, 2010	174
Myths tested: Did Adolf Hitler survive Operation Valkyrie only because he was in a conference room instead of an underground bunker? Can you literally knock some sense into a person by slapping them?

=== 2011 season ===
No. overall	No. in season	Title	Original release date	Overall episode No.
160	1	"Mission Impossible Mask"	April 6, 2011	175
Myths tested: Can realistic facial masks be used to bypass security measures as shown in the Mission: Impossible television series? Is it possible to start a merry-go-round spinning by shooting bullets at it, as depicted in Shoot 'Em Up? Is it possible to knock a dropped gun out of reach by hitting it with bullets fired from another one?
161	2	"Blue Ice"	April 13, 2011	176
Myths tested: Can a magazine and toaster be used to blow up a room full of flammable gas, as depicted in The Bourne Supremacy? Can the contents of an airplane toilet leak out mid-flight and freeze into a lethal projectile?
162	3	"Running on Water"	April 20, 2011	177
Myths tested: Can a combination of footwear and technique allow a person to run on water? Can a person survive an explosion by hiding behind a table, a car, a dumpster, or a cinderblock wall?
163	4	"Bubble Trouble"	April 27, 2011	178
Myths tested: Can a person swim through bubbling water? Can an arrow with explosives split a tree in two?
164	5	"Torpedo Tastic"	May 4, 2011	179
Myths tested: Did the Syrians design a water-skimming torpedo as early as the 13th century? If a truckload of wine catches fire, will the bottles blow their corks 100 feet and sound like a machine gun?
165	6	"Blow Your Own Sail"	May 11, 2011	180
Myths tested: How well do movie sound effects compare to their real-world counterparts? Can a sailboat stranded in calm water start moving by blowing air into its sail with an onboard fan?
166	7	"Spy Car 2"	May 18, 2011	181
Myths tested: Can wheel spikes and a hood-mounted machine gun be used to disable a pursuing vehicle? Can a bullet spin in place after being fired onto the surface of a frozen lake?
167	8	"Dodge a Bullet"	June 1, 2011	182
Myths tested: Can a person dodge a bullet after it has been fired at him? Can a fall into water inflict the same injuries as one onto pavement from the same height?
168	9	"Fixing a Flat"	June 8, 2011	183
Myths tested: What can a driver use to replace a flat tire without a spare? Can a fishing reel catch fire with a fast enough fish on the line?
SP15	Special–1	"Planes, Trains, and Automobiles"	June 15, 2011	184
The MythBusters discuss 12 favorite myths involving forms of transportation. Note: This is a special episode.
169	10	"Let There Be Light"	June 22, 2011	185
Myths tested: Can mirrors be used to reflect sunlight and illuminate a tomb, as depicted in The Mummy? Can a runaway car be safely stopped if another driver pulls in front and slows down?
170	11	"Paper Armor"	June 29, 2011	186
Myths tested: Can a swimmer increase his chances of surviving an underwater explosion by floating at the surface? Did armies in ancient China use paper armor that was as effective as steel?
171	12	"Bikes and Bazookas"	September 28, 2011	187
Myths tested: Is a motorcycle more environmentally friendly than a car? Can a bullet take out an RPG?
172	13	"Newton's Crane Cradle"	October 5, 2011	188
Myths tested: Will a super-sized Newton's cradle work? Can the weight of a bird be enough to tip a teetering car off of a cliff?
173	14	"Walk a Straight Line"	October 12, 2011	189
Myths tested: Is it impossible for humans to walk in a straight line without a point of reference? Will binary explosives explode in the case of a fender bender?
174	15	"Duct Tape Plane"	October 19, 2011	190
Myths tested: Can excavators row a barge, take you wakeboarding, or do acrobatics? Can you patch the fuselage of a plane with duct tape?
175	16	"Flying Guillotine"	October 26, 2011	191
Myths tested: Can C4 be used as a cooking fuel? Can you make a throwing weapon that could decapitate an opponent and carry the head back to the thrower?
176	17	"Drain Disaster"	November 2, 2011	192
Myths tested: Will an explosion in a sewer launch a manhole cover as seen in many Hollywood films? Can truck bedliner withstand a car crash, a dog bite, and an explosion?
SP16	Special–2	"Location, Location, Location"	November 9, 2011	193
The MythBusters discuss 12 favorite locations they have used for testing myths in the past. Note: This is a special episode.
SP17	Special–3	"Wet and Wild"	November 16, 2011	194
The MythBusters count down their 12 favorite water-based myths from prior episodes. Note: This is a special episode.
177	18	"Wheel of Mythfortune"	November 23, 2011	195
Myths tested: Is it possible to re-inflate a flat tire and re-seat it on its rim by spraying in engine starting fluid and igniting it? How effective are various handgun firing stances? If a live grenade lands near a person, can he avoid shrapnel injuries by lying flat on the ground? Do people presented with the Monty Hall problem tend to stick with their first choice? Would people presented with the Monty Hall problem be more likely to win if they changed their decision?
178	19	"Toilet Bomb"	November 30, 2011	196
Myths tested: If a pressure-triggered bomb is cooled with liquid nitrogen, can its detonation be delayed long enough for a person to seek protection, as seen in Lethal Weapon 2? Can airplanes save fuel by flying in a V-formation like a flock of birds?

=== 2012 season ===
No. overall	No. in season	Title	Original release date	Overall episode No.
179	1	"Duct Tape Island"	March 25, 2012	197
Myths tested: Can a pallet of duct tape help you survive on a deserted island?
180	2	"Fire vs. Ice"	April 1, 2012	198
Myths tested: Can a fire extinguisher hold off a flamethrower? Can a fleet of cars kick up enough dust to blind a surveillance drone?
181	3	"Square Wheels"	April 8, 2012	199
Myths tested: Can a vehicle run as well on square wheels as it does on round ones? Can two cars stuck nose-to-nose really do the maneuvers shown in the film Date Night?
182	4	"Swinging Pirates"	April 15, 2012	200
Myths tested: Can the swinging-cage rescue in Pirates of the Caribbean: Dead Man's Chest really be done? Can an oil drum filled with methanol work as a high speed go kart?
183	5	"Battle of the Sexes"	April 22, 2012	201
Myths tested: Are men better at driving than women? Are women better at reading facial emotions than men? Are men better at grilling than women? Are men better at following maps than women? Are men better at packing the car for a trip than women?
184	6	"Driving in Heels"	April 29, 2012	202
Myths tested: Does a driver's choice of footwear affect driving performance? Does a full bladder pose as much of a driving hazard as being legally intoxicated? Can superglue be used to turn a room upside down? Can superglue restrain a driver as well as a seat belt does during a collision?
185	7	"Revenge of the Myth"	May 6, 2012	203
Myths tested: Can fireworks really launch a person over a lake? (Revisit of: Fireworks Man); Can the weight of a bird be enough to tip a teetering car off of a cliff? (Revisit of: Bird Balance); Can a water heater turned on its side be used as a cannon? Can excavators be used to thread a needle or pour a glass of wine?
186	8	"Bouncing Bullet"	May 13, 2012	204
Myths tested: Can a bullet ricochet off pavement and up through a car's floorboard, as seen in Burn Notice? Can you ride an explosion's shock wave to jump farther than you can under your own power?
SP18	Special–1	"Mailbag Special"	May 20, 2012	205
Myths tested: Can you eat a spoonful of cinnamon without drinking water? Which will fall faster, a six-pack of light beer or regular beer? Can a row of 25 watermelons stop a bullet fired from a .50 caliber Desert Eagle pistol? Can a van loaded with leaking containers of flammable gases explode when it receives a signal from its keyless remote? Note: This is a special episode. The Build Team answered a series of randomly chosen letters sent in by viewers, answering questions and doing a series of short tests.
187	9	"Bubble Pack Plunge"	June 3, 2012	206
Myths tested: Can you survive a 35 ft fall while covered in bubble wrap? Can a rocket-powered ejector seat flip an upside-down car back onto its wheels, as seen in Die Another Day?
188	10	"Duel Dilemmas"	June 10, 2012	207
Myths tested: Should you really never bring a knife to a gunfight? Will you lose a sword fight if you try to strike first? Did the 14th century Chinese design a two-stage, arrow-launching missile?
189	11	"Hollywood Gunslingers"	June 17, 2012	208
Myths tested: Can someone running through gunfire make it out safe? Can bullets made of silver or engraved with an enemy's name be as effective as unmodified ammunition? Does the person who draws second have a better chance of winning in a gunfight? Can a nail gun inflict wounds as lethal as a firearm? Can a MAC-10 dropped down a flight of stairs start firing by itself? Can a person firing two pistols simultaneously, rather than alternating left and right hand shots, hit targets more effectively than a person holding one pistol in a two-handed stance? (Revisit of: Firearm Fashion); Is the length of a typical action-movie gunfight realistic?
SP19	Special–2	"Jawsome Shark Special"	August 13, 2012	209
Adam and Jamie count down their 25 favorite shark-related myths. Note: This is a special episode.
190	12	"Titanic Survival"	October 7, 2012	210
Myths tested: Could Jack have survived with Rose in the ending of Titanic? Is it possible to build a rocket-powered surfboard? Note: James Cameron was a special guest on this episode.
191	13	"Trench Torpedo"	October 14, 2012	211
Myths tested: Can a trench with perfect 90° corners absorb an explosion's shockwave inside the trench better than a trench with rounded corners? Can balloons act like an airbag during a car crash and save someone's life?
192	14	"Hail Hijinx" "Cliffhanger Bridge Boom"	October 21, 2012 (US); September 3, 2012 (AUS)	212
Myths tested: Can you jump to safety from a collapsing rope bridge as seen in the film Cliffhanger? Can a strong enough hailstorm sink a boat?
193	15	"Fright Night"	October 28, 2012	213
Myths tested: Can certain sound frequencies persuade people that an area is haunted? Is it really possible to smell fear? Is it really as easy to move and bury a dead body as it is in the movies?
194	16	"Mini Myth Medley"	November 4, 2012	214
Myths tested: Are people really well-acquainted with the backs of their own hands? Can a needle be thrown through a glass pane without shattering it? Is it really impossible to ride a bicycle underwater? Does the "potty dance" really allow you to delay the urge to urinate?
195	17	"Cannonball Chemistry"	November 11, 2012	215
Myths tested: Can a mattress cushion the impact of a long fall onto water? Are stone cannonballs as deadly as steel ones?
196	18	"Food Fables"	November 18, 2012	216
Myths tested: Can you cook a full holiday meal on the engine of a running car? Does the tryptophan in turkey make you sleepy? Is it easy to confuse the taste of unusual meat with chicken? Can a particular Chinese pressure vessel be used to cook popcorn faster than other methods?
SP20	Special–3	"Explosions A to Z" "The A to Z of Explosives"	November 25, 2012 (US); September 24, 2012 (AUS)	217
The Build Team goes through the alphabet highlighting some of the show's 752 detonations and counting. Note: This is a special episode.

=== 2013 season ===
No. overall	No. in season	Title	Original release date	Overall episode No.
197	1	"JATO Rocket Car: Mission Accomplished?"	May 1, 2013	218
Myths tested: Can a 1967 Chevy take off with JATO rockets, like in the tale of the JATO Rocket Car? (Revisit of: JATO Car); Note: This was the first of two "10th Anniversary" episodes
198	2	"Deadliest Catch Crabtastic Special"	May 8, 2013	219
Myths tested: Will a crab pot drag you overboard to the bottom if your foot is caught in a coil? Is it better to work a 30-hour grind with no sleep than a 20 minute nap every 6 hours? Are crab pots truly indestructible? Note: Deadliest Catch captains Johnathan Hillstrand and Scott "Junior" Campbell guest star in this episode.
199	3	"Down and Dirty/Earthquake Survival"	May 15, 2013	220
Myths tested: Is a bathroom's hand dryer better than a paper towel? Which public restroom stall is the cleanest? Is better to stand in the doorway during an earthquake?
200	4	"Indy Car Special"	May 22, 2013	221
Myths tested: Can man beat machine in a 30-ft, standing-start sprint? Can a driver lose 10 lbs during a race? Can the suction created by a speeding car rip loose a manhole cover during a street race?
201	5	"Battle of the Sexes: Round 2"	May 29, 2013	222
Myths tested: Will lost men really not stop and ask for directions? Are women better multi-taskers? Are women better at parallel parking? Are men better at throwing objects than women?
202	6	"Motorcycle Water Ski"	June 5, 2013 (US); May 6, 2013 (AUS)	223
Myths tested: Can a motorcycle traveling at highway speeds drive across the surface of a lake? Can you survive a jump from a high-rise building with a parachute made from a hotel room's contents?
203	7	"Hypermiling/Crash Cushions"	June 12, 2013 (US); May 27, 2013 (AUS)	224
Myths tested: Could a man sandwiched between two big men in the backseat of a car survive the car being T-boned by a truck, as seen in Headhunters? Can hypermiling techniques really double your car's fuel efficiency?
204	8	"Duct Tape Canyon"	June 19, 2013	225
Myths tested: Can Adam and Jamie cross a canyon and reach civilization using only basic supplies, duct tape, and bubble wrap? Note: This is a special episode. It was used to promote Skywire Live.
205	9	"Painting With Explosives/Bifurcated Boat"	June 26, 2013	226
Myths tested: Can a room be painted using explosives via Adam's snowflake frame or Jamie's steel sphere? Can a boat be split in two by a channel marker? (Revisit of: Bifurcated Boat); Note: This was the second of two "10th Anniversary" episodes.
206	10	"Breaking Bad Special"	August 12, 2013 (US); July 15, 2013 (AUS)	227
Myths tested: Can concentrated hydrofluoric acid in a bathtub completely dissolve a human body, create a hole through the tub, and dissolve the bathroom floor below it? Can a chunk of solid mercury fulminate thrown on the ground explode, kill or injure bystanders, and break nearby windows, all without injuring the thrower? Note: Breaking Bad creator Vince Gilligan and actor Aaron Paul make a guest appearance.
207	11	"Zombie Special"	October 17, 2013	228
Myths tested: Is an axe more effective than a gun when you are swarmed by zombies? Can the force of many people bust down a door? Can you escape from a horde of zombies? Note: The Walking Dead's Michael Rooker guest stars in this episode.

=== 2014 season ===
No. overall	No. in season	Title	Original release date	Overall episode No.
208	1	"Star Wars Special"	January 4, 2014	229
Myths tested: Could Luke have safely swung across the chasm in the Death Star while carrying Princess Leia? Would the Ewoks' swinging log trap have destroyed an Imperial walker? Would a Tauntaun carcass have kept Luke from freezing to death on the cold climate of Hoth?
209	2	"Moonshiner Myths"	January 11, 2014	230
Myths tested: Can a moonshine still explode and destroy the shack it is hidden in? Can a car fueled by moonshine run as well as one running on gasoline?
210	3	"Hollywood Car Crash Cliches"	January 18, 2014	231
Myths tested: Can two men carrying a pane of glass survive unscathed if a car smashes through it? Can a rocket-propelled grenade explosion flip an SUV? Can a large truck plow through a traffic jam without stopping?
211	4	"Car Chase Chaos / Animal Antics" "Car Chase Chaos/Animal Avoidance"	January 25, 2014 (US); June 3, 2013 (AUS)	232
Myths tested: Can you share the task of driving, change places while driving, or push the driver out while moving at regular speed? Can you prevent cats from defecating in your garden? What methods work best to repel snakes? What methods work best to deter bears?
212	5	"*DO* Try This at Home?"	February 1, 2014	233
Myths tested: Can watering plants with microwaved water kill them? Can you put out a fire on a lake by turning a boat at an angle? Can metronomes started at different times sync together? Can a ball chain "levitate" over a lip of a cup? Can sugar and sulfuric acid explode like a "black snake"? Are dry ice bombs lethal? Can hydrogen peroxide, yeast, water, liquid dish soap, and food coloring create "elephant toothpaste"? Can water coming out of a hose with a speaker next to it create an optical illusion that it is going backwards?
213	6	"Mythssion Impossible"	February 15, 2014	234
Myths tested: Can you herd cats? Can you catch a greased pig? Can you stuff 10 pounds of feces into a 5-pound bag?
214	7	"Bullet Baloney"	February 22, 2014	235
Myths tested: Can a gun fire lethally if its barrel is bent? Can tape measures and wallets stop bullets? Will a shotgun shell on the tip of a wooden spear detonate if jabbed into an attacking animal? Can a gun work in outer space? Will a neon sign blow out in a shower of sparks if hit by a bullet? Can a gun discharge on its own if thrown into a deep fryer?
215	8	"Supersonic Ping Pong/Ice Cannon"	March 1, 2014	236
Myths tested: Can a ping pong ball inflict a lethal injury if it flies fast enough? Can a cannon and cannonballs made from ice be a reliable weapon?
216	9	"Fire in the Hole"	July 10, 2014	237
Myths tested: Could someone shoot a live grenade in midair and thus render it useless? Can you contain a TNT explosion inside an ordinary object?
217	10	"Household Disasters"	July 17, 2014 (US); May 26, 2014 (AUS)	238
Myths tested: Can an explosion caused by a hot-water heater put out a fire? Is sunscreen flammable? Can a piano being raised into a house fall and break through the roof and the floor of a house? Will a vacuum explode if it vacuums up black powder?
218	11	"Commercial Myths" "Apple Bobbing Bungee/Tennis Wing Walk"	July 24, 2014 (US); May 19, 2014 (AUS)	239
Myths tested: Can you bob for an apple during a 100 foot bungee jump? Can you really play tennis on an airplane wing mid-flight?
219	12	"Road Rage" "Driving This Crazy"	July 31, 2014 (US); May 12, 2014 (AUS)	240
Myths tested: When two cars try to knock each other off the road does it always result in a long and difficult duel? Is the silver screen trick of tipping up on to two wheels and driving sideways as easy as it seems? Can a Corvette be used as a ramp to flip into a barrel roll as in the movie Wanted?
220	13	"Laws of Attraction"	August 7, 2014	241
Myths tested: Do males prefer women with blonde hair? Do pheromone sprays work? Are women attracted to wealthy men? Do men give larger tips to women with larger breasts? Does a person’s intelligence deteriorate in the presence of members of the opposite gender?
221	14	"Traffic Tricks"	August 7, 2014 (US); July 22, 2013 (AUS)	242
Myths tested: If a single car brakes lightly, can it cause a ripple that triggers a major traffic jam? Is it better to stay in one lane in heavy traffic instead of changing lanes? Are roundabouts more efficient than four-way stop signs? For journeys less than 400 miles, is driving faster than flying?
222	15	"Plane Boarding" "Plane Boarding/Bite the Bullet"	August 21, 2014 (US); September 17, 2012 (AUS)	243
Myths tested: Is the method used for boarding planes by most airlines inefficient? Can you make an untraceable bullet out of teeth? Note: This episode marked the final appearance of Kari Byron, Grant Imahara, and Tory Belleci on the US schedule. This is the last episode to use the 2006 opening sequence and The Dandy Warhols arrangement of the theme music.

=== 2015 season ===
No. overall	No. in season	Title	Original release date	Overall episode No.
223	1	"The Simpsons Special"	January 10, 2015	244
Myths tested: Will a cherry bomb dropped in a school toilet make others act like geysers? Will placing someone between a wrecking ball and a building protect the building? Note: The Simpsons executive producer Al Jean makes a guest appearance.
224	2	"Indiana Jones Special" "The Busters of the Lost Myths"	January 17, 2015	245
Myths tested: Could Indiana Jones have outrun a battery of wall-mounted dart launchers? Can you use a whip to disarm or neutralize an enemy with a gun? Does the tip of a whip break the sound barrier? Can you use a whip to swing safely across a chasm?
225	3	"A-Team Special"	January 24, 2015	246
Myths tested: Can you build a propane-powered log cannon to shoot planks at enemies? Can you safely disable a pursuing car by blasting a manhole cover upward into it?
226	4	"Video Game Special"	January 31, 2015	247
Myths tested: Can you easily carry and deploy a large variety of weapons, as in Doom? Can you easily slice through large amounts of thrown fruit, as in Fruit Ninja?
227	5	"Transformers"	February 7, 2015	248
Myths tested: Can a car be converted into a motorcycle? Can a bicycle be modified to operate on both land and water?
228	6	"San Francisco Drift"	February 14, 2015	249
Myths tested: Can you turn a corner faster by drifting than with conventional driving methods? Can you drift into a parallel parking space without hitting the adjacent cars or the curb?
229	7	"Blow It Out of the Water"	July 18, 2015	250
Myths tested: Can a boat be blown out of the water without destroying it? Is it possible to mount a remote-controlled machine gun in a car trunk and use it to kill a roomful of people from outside a house, as seen in the finale of Breaking Bad? Note: Breaking Bad creator Vince Gilligan makes a guest appearance.
230	8	"Flights of Fantasy"	July 25, 2015	251
Myths tested: Is the Lockheed U-2 really harder to fly and land safely than any other plane currently in use? Can a drone's propellers injure a person?
231	9	"Accidental Ammo"	August 1, 2015 (US); May 27, 2015 (FIN)	252
Myths tested: Can a stone shot from a lawn mower have the same force as a bullet shot from a .357 Magnum? Can a pane of glass falling cut a person fully in half?
232	10	"Dangerous Driving"	August 8, 2015	253
Myths tested: Is talking on the phone using hands-free technology when driving equally as distracting as holding the phone in the hand? Is it easy to drive a vehicle in reverse at high speed?
233	11	"Supernatural Shooters"	August 15, 2015 (US); May 10, 2015 (NLD & BEL)	254
Myths tested: Is it possible for a hitman to fire a bullet through a wall and hit a moving target on the other side? Can you effectively fire bullets from between your fingers by putting your hand in a fire, as seen in Shoot 'Em Up? Note: Actor Jonathan Banks of Breaking Bad was a special guest in this episode.
234	12	"Unfinished Business"	August 22, 2015	255
Myths tested: Can a video game that simulates a skill lead to real-world improvement in that skill? Are hollow road spikes more effective in stopping a car than solid ones? Is it difficult to hold on to a live grenade once the pin is pulled? Can you fire and reload a pistol as quickly as in a Hollywood action movie?
235	13	"MythBusters vs. Jaws"	August 29, 2015	256
Myths tested: Is there any way to shoot a scuba tank in a shark's mouth and cause it to explode? (Revisit of: Exploding Scuba Tank); Will the sound of orcas drive sharks away? Will the smell of a dead shark drive living ones away?
236	14	"Star Wars 2" "Star Wars - The Myths Strike Back"	September 5, 2015	257
Myths tested: Is it possible for people to dive out of the way of incoming Stormtrooper shots? Does a combatant on the higher ground have a significant advantage over his opposition? Note: This is a Star Wars themed episode.

=== 2016 season ===
No. overall	No. in season	Title	Original release date	Overall episode No.
237	1	"MythBusters Revealed" "MythBusters Revealed: The Behind the Scenes Season Opener"	January 2, 2016	258
A behind-the-scenes look at the production of the final season, with clips of myths from the 2016 season.
238	2	"The Explosion Special"	January 9, 2016	259
Myths tested: Can a load of wet cement prevent a bomb in a mail truck from injuring bystanders or destroying the truck, like in MacGyver? Can you safely cross a minefield in a hovercraft?
239	3	"Tanker Crush"	January 16, 2016	260
Myths tested: Will a steam-filled railroad tank car collapse in on itself as it cools?
240	4	"Cooking Chaos"	January 23, 2016	261
Myths tested: Can you instantly cook shrimp by firing them through clouds of flour, eggs, bread crumbs, and fire? Can you use an underwater explosion to juice the inside of a fruit without damaging the skin?
241	5	"Driven to Destruction"	January 30, 2016	262
Myths tested: Can you flatten a car with explosives? Can you use a household vacuum cleaner to lift a car?
242	6	"Volunteer Special"	February 6, 2016	263
Myths tested: Is an axe really better than a gun in a zombie attack? (Revisit of: Axe vs. Gun); Can checkout wait times in a store be reduced by routing customers to the first available register instead of letting them choose their own?
243	7	"Failure Is Not an Option!"	February 13, 2016	264
Myths tested: Is drifting faster than regular driving on a dirt road? (Revisit of: Drift Turn); Can a metal cigarette lighter stop a bullet? (Revisit of: What is Bulletproof?); Can a full fishtank stop a shotgun blast? Can you survive two identical, simultaneous explosions by standing halfway between them?
244	8	"Rocketman" "Rocketmen"	February 20, 2016	265
Myths tested: Can gummy bears and feces be used as alternative rocket fuels?
245	9	"Reddit Special"	February 27, 2016	266
Myths tested: Will a flatus show up on a thermal imaging camera? Can you survive a fall from a chopper by climbing into a zorb ball? Is it really easy to punch your way out of a paper bag?
246	10	"Grand Finale" "The MythBusters Grand Finale"	March 5, 2016	267
Adam and Jamie end the show with two grand explosions, a dedication to Buster, and the destruction of past props using a truck ram.
247	11	"Reunion" "MythBusters: The Reunion"	March 5, 2016	268
Adam and Jamie invite Grant, Tory, and Kari back to reflect on the history of the show and what it meant to them.
248	12	"Duct Tape: The Return"	March 6, 2016	269
Myths tested: Can you build a working trebuchet held together only by duct tape? Can a seat belt made from duct tape save your life in a car crash? Note: This episode aired on Science. This is the final episode of the original series, and also marked the final appearance of Jamie Hyneman. Adam Savage would return in 2019's Mythbusters Jr..

=== 2017 season ===
No. overall	No. in season	Title	Original release date	Overall episode No.
249	1	"Heads Will Roll"	November 15, 2017	270
Myths tested: If you are in the front passenger seat of a car that gets in a collision, will you be killed if you have your feet up on the dashboard? Can a sword cut off someone's head so fast and smoothly so that the head will just stay sitting on the victim's body?
250	2	"Chimney Cannon"	November 22, 2017	271
Myths tested: Can a burglar be shot out of a chimney when the gas fireplace gets lit? Can a bullet shot into a tree kill a lumberjack when his chainsaw hits the bullet?
251	3	"Earthquake Water Heater"	November 29, 2017	272
Myths tested: Can a water-heater that has been knocked over in an earthquake explode to destroy the garage it is in and the motor-home parked next to it? Can a flatulence "dutch oven" cause an explosion?
252	4	"Rock 'n' Roll Road Rage"	December 6, 2017	273
Myths tested: Can a leaping carp kill a water skier by hitting him? Does listening to aggressive music lead to aggressive driving?
253	5	"Invisible Assassins"	December 13, 2017	274
Myths tested: Can a duplex nail fired from a fire extinguisher disable a bad guy? Can light bulbs modified to fit in a shotgun shell with a bag of nuts and bolts around it become a lethal fragmentation-style grenade when the bulbs are turned on? Can a shotgun shell rigged with a nail to fire from under a floor kill a person stepping on the board?
254	6	"Dead Body Double"	December 20, 2017	275
Myths tested: Can a human body be used to protect you in a gun battle? Can oobleck be bomb-proof?

=== 2018 season ===
No. overall	No. in season	Title	Original release date	Overall episode No.
255	1	"Fire Arrow vs. Gas Tank" "Fiery Arrow vs. Gas Tank"	January 3, 2018	276
Myths tested: Will a car explode if shot in the gas tank with a fire arrow? Will the tribal initiation of shooting arrows straight up make them return to earth at lethal speeds?
256	2	"Pane in the Glass"	January 10, 2018	277
Myths tested: Can you jump off a building holding a rope, swing back, and shoot out a window to return to a lower floor? Do old remedies prevent you from crying when cutting onions?
257	3	"Wild Wild West"	January 17, 2018	278
Myths tested: In a gunfight is it better to take time to aim carefully, or just fire as rapidly as possible? From the film Jonah Hex (2010), will a semi-automatic dynamite-firing crossbow actually work?
258	4	"Spike in the Road" "Geezer Geyser"	January 24, 2018	279
Myths tested: Can police road spikes be defeated? Can a high powered Vegas water fountain levitate a drunken old geezer riding an inflatable pool tube?
259	5	"Dynamite Deposit"	January 31, 2018	280
Myths tested: Can a bomb left in a safe blow the door without damaging the dollar bills? Do people choose dogs that look like them?
260	6	"Backseat Getaway Driver" "Knock Me Over with a Feather"	February 7, 2018	281
Myths tested: Can an escaping thief with broken legs drive a stolen car from the backseat using a walking cane? Is the idiom "knock me down with a feather" true?
261	7	"Electrified Escape"	Unaired (US); February 21, 2018 (UK)	282
Myths tested: Is it possible to escape from a burning car crashed into a power pole, without getting electrocuted? Is it better for a pedestrian to jump up when a car is about to hit them, or stand still?
262	8	"Dropping a Bomb"	Unaired (US); February 28, 2018 (UK)	283
Myths tested: Can dropping molten salt into a toilet unblock it? Is 3rd person perspective better than 1st person in a real world video game obstacle course?

=== Special episodes ===
Special episodes listed here were aired separately to the normal season episodes.

No. overall	No. in season	Title	Original release date
BO1	Special–1	"Best Animal Myths"	March 21, 2004
This is a "Best of" recut of previously tested animal-related myths from various episodes. The myths are: Chicken Gun from the episode "Chicken Gun", which originally aired January 18, 2004; Goldfish Memory from the episode "Sinking Titanic", which originally aired February 22, 2004; Does a Duck's Quack Echo? from the episode "Alcatraz Escape", which originally aired December 12, 2003
BO2	Special–2	"Best Electric Myths"	May 6, 2004
This is a "Best of" recut of previously tested electricity-related myths from various episodes. The myths are: Peeing on the Third Rail from the episode "Barrel of Bricks", which originally aired October 10, 2003; Lightning Strikes Tongue Piercing from the episode "Lightning Strikes/Tongue Piercings", which originally aired November 11, 2003; Microwave Madness from the episode "Penny Drop", which originally aired October 17, 2003
BO3	Special–3	"Best Explosions"	June 29, 2004
This is a "Best of" recut of previously tested explosion-related myths from various episodes. The myths are: Cell Phone Destruction from the episode "Cell Phone Destroys Gas Station", which originally aired October 3, 2003; Raccoon Rocket from the episode "Stinky Car", which originally aired December 5, 2003; Tree Cannon from the episode "Lightning Strikes/Tongue Piercings", which originally aired November 11, 2003; Exploding Toilet from the episode "Exploding Toilet", which originally aired September 23, 2003
SP11	Special–4	"Young Scientist Special"	April 26, 2008
Myths tested: Are electric cars slower than gas-powered ones?; Do greenhouse gases increase the amount of heat absorbed by air?; Do cows hurt the environment?; Can cow manure be used to help the environment?; Note: This episode aired on the Science Channel. Former MythBuster Scottie Chapman reappeared in this episode to assist in the testing, along with Discovery Channel's young scientist winners.
SP13	Special–5	"Car Conundrum"	June 23, 2010
This is a recut of previously tested car-related myths from various episodes. The myths are: Underwater Car from the episode "Underwater Car", which originally aired January 24, 2007; Hollywood Crash Test from the episode "Demolition Derby Special", which originally aired April 8, 2009; Car Remote Capers from the episode "Viewers' Special", which originally aired August 15, 2007
BC1	Special–6	"Buster's Cut: Alcohol Myths"	June 30, 2010
This is a "Buster's Cut" of the episode "Alcohol Myths", which originally aired October 22, 2008.
BC2	Special–7	"Buster's Cut: Duct Tape Hour 2"	July 7, 2010
This is a "Buster's Cut" of the episode "Duct Tape Hour 2", which originally aired May 12, 2010.
BC3	Special–8	"Buster's Cut: Knock Your Socks Off"	July 14, 2010
This is a "Buster's Cut" of the episode "Knock Your Socks Off", which originally aired October 7, 2009.
BC4	Special–9	"Buster's Cut: Viewer Special Threequel"	July 21, 2010
This is a "Buster's Cut" of the episode "Viewer Special Threequel", which originally aired November 19, 2008.
BC5	Special–10	"Buster's Cut: Bottle Bash"	July 28, 2010
This is a "Buster's Cut" of the episode "Bottle Bash", which originally aired April 14, 2010.
DD1	Special–11	"Demolition Derby: Hollywood Havoc"	January 5, 2011
This is a recut of previously tested car and movie-related myths from various episodes.
DD2	Special–12	"Demolition Derby: Car Chaos"	January 12, 2011
This is a recut of previously tested car-related myths from various episodes.
SP21	Special–13	"Blast From The Past"	May 1, 2013
The first ever MythBusters episode, "Jet-Assisted Chevy", gets remastered with behind the scenes details and info.
