= The Second Forty Years =

Reference Book

- Author: Edward Stieglitz
- Genre: Self-help
- Publication date: 1946

The Second Forty Years is a 1946 nonfiction self-help book about aging, by Edward Stieglitz.

Stieglitz graduated from Rush Medical College in 1921 and was on the faculty of the University of Chicago from 1923 to 1938. In 1940 a grant was given to support a gerontologist at the United States Public Health Service, and Stieglitz was given the post. His research was also supported by the National Institute of Health. Stieglitz left the post after a year, for personal reasons.

The Second Forty Years provides Stieglitz's professional advice for the layman. It describes what can be expected during the aging process and what can be done about it, discussing chronic progressive disorders which require preventative care, sex, the importance of leisure and rest, and so forth. According to Stieglitz, mere longevity is not goal enough, but rather constructive health practices should be undertaken to enhance the quality of life. Regarding menopause, Stieglitz characterized it as a "truly normal phase of living" and decried the "distorted descriptions" of old wives' tales.

Newspaper advertisements for The Second Forty Years are probably the source for the popular quotation "It's not the years in your life that count, it's the life in your years", which is commonly misattributed to Abraham Lincoln.
