= List of MythBusters special episodes =

- No. of episodes: 13

Release
- Original network: Discovery Channel
- Original release: March 21, 2004 – May 1, 2013

The cast of the television series MythBusters perform experiments to verify or debunk urban legends, old wives' tales, and the like. This is a list of the various myths tested on the show as well as the results of the experiments (the myth is Busted, Plausible, or Confirmed).

Special episodes listed here were aired separately to the normal season episodes.

== Episode overview ==
No. overall	No. in season	Title	Original release date
BO1	Special–1	"Best Animal Myths"	March 21, 2004
This is a "Best of" recut of previously tested animal-related myths from various episodes. The myths are: Chicken Gun from the episode "Chicken Gun", which originally aired January 18, 2004; Goldfish Memory from the episode "Sinking Titanic", which originally aired February 22, 2004; Does a Duck's Quack Echo? from the episode "Alcatraz Escape", which originally aired December 12, 2003
BO2	Special–2	"Best Electric Myths"	May 6, 2004
This is a "Best of" recut of previously tested electricity-related myths from various episodes. The myths are: Peeing on the Third Rail from the episode "Barrel of Bricks", which originally aired October 10, 2003; Lightning Strikes Tongue Piercing from the episode "Lightning Strikes/Tongue Piercings", which originally aired November 11, 2003; Microwave Madness from the episode "Penny Drop", which originally aired October 17, 2003
BO3	Special–3	"Best Explosions"	June 29, 2004
This is a "Best of" recut of previously tested explosion-related myths from various episodes. The myths are: Cell Phone Destruction from the episode "Cell Phone Destroys Gas Station", which originally aired October 3, 2003; Raccoon Rocket from the episode "Stinky Car", which originally aired December 5, 2003; Tree Cannon from the episode "Lightning Strikes/Tongue Piercings", which originally aired November 11, 2003; Exploding Toilet from the episode "Exploding Toilet", which originally aired September 23, 2003
SP11	Special–4	"Young Scientist Special"	April 26, 2008
Myths tested: Are electric cars slower than gas-powered ones?; Do greenhouse gases increase the amount of heat absorbed by air?; Do cows hurt the environment?; Can cow manure be used to help the environment?; Note: This episode aired on the Science Channel. Former MythBuster Scottie Chapman reappeared in this episode to assist in the testing, along with Discovery Channel's young scientist winners.
SP13	Special–5	"Car Conundrum"	June 23, 2010
This is a recut of previously tested car-related myths from various episodes. The myths are: Underwater Car from the episode "Underwater Car", which originally aired January 24, 2007; Hollywood Crash Test from the episode "Demolition Derby Special", which originally aired April 8, 2009; Car Remote Capers from the episode "Viewers' Special", which originally aired August 15, 2007
BC1	Special–6	"Buster's Cut: Alcohol Myths"	June 30, 2010
This is a "Buster's Cut" of the episode "Alcohol Myths", which originally aired October 22, 2008.
BC2	Special–7	"Buster's Cut: Duct Tape Hour 2"	July 7, 2010
This is a "Buster's Cut" of the episode "Duct Tape Hour 2", which originally aired May 12, 2010.
BC3	Special–8	"Buster's Cut: Knock Your Socks Off"	July 14, 2010
This is a "Buster's Cut" of the episode "Knock Your Socks Off", which originally aired October 7, 2009.
BC4	Special–9	"Buster's Cut: Viewer Special Threequel"	July 21, 2010
This is a "Buster's Cut" of the episode "Viewer Special Threequel", which originally aired November 19, 2008.
BC5	Special–10	"Buster's Cut: Bottle Bash"	July 28, 2010
This is a "Buster's Cut" of the episode "Bottle Bash", which originally aired April 14, 2010.
DD1	Special–11	"Demolition Derby: Hollywood Havoc"	January 5, 2011
This is a recut of previously tested car and movie-related myths from various episodes.
DD2	Special–12	"Demolition Derby: Car Chaos"	January 12, 2011
This is a recut of previously tested car-related myths from various episodes.
SP21	Special–13	"Blast From The Past"	May 1, 2013
The first ever MythBusters episode, "Jet-Assisted Chevy", gets remastered with behind the scenes details and info.

== Best of ==
In 2004, Discovery Channel aired three special episodes, which were a compilation of some of the best animal, electric, and explosion related myths.

== Buster's Cut ==
During 2010, Discovery Channel aired a series of episodes that were titled "Buster's Cut". According to the episode introductions, these were edited reruns of earlier episodes featuring never before seen footage and behind the scenes information.

== Episode SP11 – "Young Scientist Special" ==
- Original air date: April 26, 2008 (Science Channel)

A team of winners in Discovery's "Young Scientist Challenge" competitions tested environmental myths with the team. Former MythBuster Scottie Chapman returned to assist with a myth.

Myth statement	Status	Notes
Electric cars are more sluggish than gasoline-powered cars.	Busted	They first had Jamie drive Brandon (a Young Scientist Challenge winner) in both a gas and electric consumer grade car, and blindfolded Brandon and covered Jamie's ears to see if they could tell the difference. Brandon couldn't tell, but being an experienced driver, Jamie was able to immediately tell based on the electric car's acceleration. Then, Adam, Jamie, and Brandon built an electric go-kart using lithium iron phosphate batteries and tested it against a gas go-kart. Despite weighing twice as much as the gas go-kart, the electric go-kart performed about the same. Then they went to a professional track and watched the KillaCycle, an electric drag motorcycle race against a stock gas motorcycle. The gas motorcycle won by a slight margin. Then they had the X1 electric sports car race against a Ferrari F430, and while the Ferrari's top speed was faster, the electric car accelerated faster and beat it in a drag race. Finally, they had the electric car race against an FJR50 Formula 3 race car. While the Formula 3 car easily beat the electric car, the electric car is considered a "street car", not a race car, and it did well enough that they proclaimed electric cars to be anything but slow.

=== The Great Ice Debate ===
Myth statement	Status	Notes
Greenhouse gases increase the amount of heat absorbed by air.	Confirmed	Airtight containers with carbon dioxide or methane added got one degree Celsius (2 °F) hotter than regular when heated by a hot lamp.

=== Cattle Calamity ===
Myth statement	Status	Notes
Cows hurt the environment.	Confirmed	Cows emit methane—though not mostly from flatulence, but from belching — and their feces emit even more methane once they begin rotting. Since there are so many cows, the methane contributes significantly to global warming.
Cow manure can be used to help the environment.	Confirmed	Cow manure can be used to power things. The Young Scientists helped collect cow manure and extracted methane gas from it. Grant hooked up the methane gas and used it to power a hand lawnmower. They then saw that the farm where they had collected cow manure from received 90% of its electricity from its own manure-powered generator.

== BBC Two re-edited shows ==
BBC Two's editions of MythBusters are narrated by Rufus Hound. The episodes only ran for 30 minutes.

Date broadcast	Myths
July 27, 2006	Penny Drop, Who Gets Wetter?, Exploding Toilet
August 3, 2006	Exploding CDs?, Silicone Breasts, Cell Phone Destruction
September 7, 2006	Lightning Strikes Tongue Piercing, 101 Uses For Cola, (Note: Partial; cleaning blood, pennies and chrome, dissolving teeth and steaks) Hammer Bridge Drop
September 14, 2006	JATO Car, Pop Rocks (Note: Called "Space Dust" in the British narration, as it is the more common name for Pop Rocks in the UK.)
September 21, 2006	Buried Alive, Beat the Breath Test
September 28, 2006	Explosive Decompression, Rear Axle, Frog Giggin'
October 5, 2006	The Mad Trombonist, Goldfish Memory, Sinking Titanic
October 12, 2006	Escape from Alcatraz, Stud Finders & Mind Control Chips, Does a Duck's Quack Echo?
October 19, 2006	Rowing Water Skier, Toothbrush Surprise, Breakstep Bridge
October 31, 2006	Buried in Concrete, Daddy Long-Legs, Jet Taxi
November 7, 2006	Lawn Chair Balloon, Poppy Seed Drug Test, Goldfinger
November 14, 2006	Chicken Gun, Killer Washing Machine
February 19, 2007	Stuck on You, Biscuit Bullet
