= MythBusters (2017 season) =

- No. of episodes: 6

Release
- Original network: Science Channel
- Original release: November 15 – December 20, 2017

Season chronology
- ← Previous; 2016 season Next → 2018 season

The cast of the television series MythBusters perform experiments to verify or debunk urban legends, old wives' tales, and the like. This is a list of the various myths tested on the show as well as the results of the experiments (the myth is either busted, plausible, or confirmed). The 2017 season premiered on November 15, in a Wednesday time slot, on the Science Channel.

This is the first season with new hosts Jon Lung and Brian Louden, and without Jamie Hyneman and Adam Savage.

== Episode overview ==
| No. overall | No. in season | Title | Original release date | Overall episode No. |
|---|---|---|---|---|
| 249 | 1 | "Heads Will Roll" | November 15, 2017 | 270 |
Myths tested: If you are in the front passenger seat of a car that gets in a collision, will you be killed if you have your feet up on the dashboard? Can a sword cut off someone's head so fast and smoothly so that the head will just stay sitting on the victim's body?
| 250 | 2 | "Chimney Cannon" | November 22, 2017 | 271 |
Myths tested: Can a burglar be shot out of a chimney when the gas fireplace gets lit? Can a bullet shot into a tree kill a lumberjack when his chainsaw hits the bullet?
| 251 | 3 | "Earthquake Water Heater" | November 29, 2017 | 272 |
Myths tested: Can a water-heater that has been knocked over in an earthquake explode to destroy the garage it is in and the motor-home parked next to it? Can a flatulence "dutch oven" cause an explosion?
| 252 | 4 | "Rock 'n' Roll Road Rage" | December 6, 2017 | 273 |
Myths tested: Can a leaping carp kill a water skier by hitting him? Does listening to aggressive music lead to aggressive driving?
| 253 | 5 | "Invisible Assassins" | December 13, 2017 | 274 |
Myths tested: Can a duplex nail fired from a fire extinguisher disable a bad guy? Can light bulbs modified to fit in a shotgun shell with a bag of nuts and bolts around it become a lethal fragmentation-style grenade when the bulbs are turned on? Can a shotgun shell rigged with a nail to fire from under a floor kill a person stepping on the board?
| 254 | 6 | "Dead Body Double" | December 20, 2017 | 275 |
Myths tested: Can a human body be used to protect you in a gun battle? Can oobleck be bomb-proof?

== Episode 249 – "Heads Will Roll" ==
- Original air date: November 15, 2017

=== Airbag Disaster ===
| Myth | Status | Notes |
|---|---|---|
| A passenger in a low-speed car crash with his/her legs up on the dashboard will be killed by airbag. | Busted | Although the feet and legs suffer extensive and life-altering injury, the injuries themselves are not lethal. |

=== Delayed Casualty ===
| Myth | Status | Notes |
|---|---|---|
| A sword can travel through somebody's neck so quickly that the head will stay on the victim's body. | Busted | Even a rocket-powered blade did not move fast enough to cut the head off without also causing it to fall off the body. |

== Episode 250 – "Chimney Cannon" ==
- Original air date: November 22, 2017

=== Killer Chainsaw ===
| Myth | Status | Notes |
|---|---|---|
| A lumberjack can be killed if a bullet has been shot into a tree and the lumberjack's chainsaw catches the bullet when the tree is being cut down. | Busted | Even a high-powered "Hot Saw" could not cause the bullet to move quickly enough to be lethal. |

=== Chimney Cannon ===
| Myth | Status | Notes |
|---|---|---|
| A burglar who tries to enter a house through the chimney will get shot out like a cannonball when the homeowners turn on the gas fireplace. | Busted | It was not possible to set up enough back-pressure in normal circumstances to cause the burglar to be shot out of the chimney. When the guys sealed up the firebox to get enough pressure, the chimney exploded instead of launching the burglar. Additionally, the human body would not be able to survive the blast pressure even if the proper seal was implemented. |

== Episode 251 – "Earthquake Water Heater" ==
- Original air date: November 29, 2017

=== Earthquake Water Heater ===
| Myth | Status | Notes |
|---|---|---|
| A water heater tank damaged by an earthquake can turn into a rocket, destroying the garage it is in then going through the motor-home parked next to the garage. | Plausible | The horizontally launched water heater destroyed the shed they built to simulate the garage and slammed into the frame of the motor-home. It was determined that if the water heater was aimed up just a little bit, it would have gone through the side of the motor-home, so the myth was deemed plausible. |

=== Dutch Oven Explosion ===
| Myth | Status | Notes |
|---|---|---|
| A camper lets rip a Dutch oven (a fart inside a sleeping bag) when his companion is lighting her cigarette. This results in an explosion. | Busted | The flammable gas does not stay concentrated enough to cause a fire, let alone an explosion, while a standard-issue sleeping bag would be too porous to contain the needed quantity of gas. |

== Episode 252 – "Rock 'n' Roll Road Rage" ==
- Original air date: December 6, 2017

=== Killer Carp ===
| Myth | Status | Notes |
|---|---|---|
| A silver carp, jumping out of the water, can hit a water skier hard enough to kill him. | Confirmed | A two-pound fish fired from an air cannon at Buster broke his anatomically realistic neck in several places when the fish hit him in the head at 35 miles per hour. |

=== Rock 'n' Roll Road Rage ===
| Myth | Status | Notes |
|---|---|---|
| Listening to violent or aggressive music will make someone drive more aggressively. | Plausible | For those already inclined to drive aggressively, listening to aggressive music contributes to more aggressive driving. |

== Episode 253 – "Invisible Assassins" ==
- Original air date: December 13, 2017

=== Fire Extingisher Nail Gun ===
| Myth | Status | Notes |
|---|---|---|
| A duplex nail fired from a fire extinguisher can disable a bad guy. | Busted | From the movie, The Bourne Legacy. A nail fired from a CO_{2} fire extinguisher with only the flow regulator removed was not accurate enough or powerful enough to penetrate the human analog. When a 6 foot (1.8 metres) barrel extension was added to the fire extinguisher, the nail was able to go all the way through the ballistics dummy, but the barrel extension did not show up in the movie, so the myth is still Busted. |

=== Shotgun Chandelier ===
| Myth | Status | Notes |
|---|---|---|
| Light bulbs modified to fit in a shotgun shell with a bag of nuts and bolts around it can become lethal fragmentation-style grenades when the bulbs are turned on. | Busted | From the James Bond movie, Skyfall. The shotgun shells were ignited by the light bulb filaments, but did not explode, so the shrapnel just fell to the floor when the plastic bags holding it melted. |

=== Shotgun Floorboards ===
| Myth | Status | Notes |
|---|---|---|
| A shotgun shell rigged with a nail to fire from under a floor will kill the person stepping on the board. | Busted | From the James Bond movie, Skyfall. The shotgun shells fired, but the oak floorboards deflected the shotgun shot and kept Buster from losing his leg. |

== Episode 254 – "Dead Body Double" ==
- Original air date: December 20, 2017

=== Dead Body Double ===
| Myth | Status | Notes |
|---|---|---|
| In a gun battle, picking up a deceased human body and hiding behind it will stop the bullets still being shot at you from hitting you. | Busted | Carrying a dead body in a gun fight was plausible, but the human analog did not stop the bullets in any significant way. |

=== Goo Gone Wild ===
| Myth | Status | Notes |
|---|---|---|
| Oobleck can be bomb proof. | Busted | The oobleck actually increased the intensity of the blast. |
