= MythBusters (2016 season) =

- No. of episodes: 12

Release
- Original network: Discovery Channel
- Original release: January 2 – March 6, 2016

Season chronology
- ← Previous; 2015 season Next → 2017 season

The cast of the television series MythBusters perform experiments to verify or debunk urban legends, old wives' tales, and the like. This is a list of the various myths tested on the show as well as the results of the experiments (the myth is either busted, plausible, or confirmed). The 2016 season premiered on January 2, in a Saturday time slot.

In October 2015, Hyneman and Savage confirmed that the season premiering in January 2016 would be their final season of MythBusters after over 13 years of the show.

== Episode overview ==
No. overall	No. in season	Title	Original release date	Overall episode No.
237	1	"MythBusters Revealed" "MythBusters Revealed: The Behind the Scenes Season Opener"	January 2, 2016	258
A behind-the-scenes look at the production of the final season, with clips of myths from the 2016 season.
238	2	"The Explosion Special"	January 9, 2016	259
Myths tested: Can a load of wet cement prevent a bomb in a mail truck from injuring bystanders or destroying the truck, like in MacGyver? Can you safely cross a minefield in a hovercraft?
239	3	"Tanker Crush"	January 16, 2016	260
Myths tested: Will a steam-filled railroad tank car collapse in on itself as it cools?
240	4	"Cooking Chaos"	January 23, 2016	261
Myths tested: Can you instantly cook shrimp by firing them through clouds of flour, eggs, bread crumbs, and fire? Can you use an underwater explosion to juice the inside of a fruit without damaging the skin?
241	5	"Driven to Destruction"	January 30, 2016	262
Myths tested: Can you flatten a car with explosives? Can you use a household vacuum cleaner to lift a car?
242	6	"Volunteer Special"	February 6, 2016	263
Myths tested: Is an axe really better than a gun in a zombie attack? (Revisit of: Axe vs. Gun); Can checkout wait times in a store be reduced by routing customers to the first available register instead of letting them choose their own?
243	7	"Failure Is Not an Option!"	February 13, 2016	264
Myths tested: Is drifting faster than regular driving on a dirt road? (Revisit of: Drift Turn); Can a metal cigarette lighter stop a bullet? (Revisit of: What is Bulletproof?); Can a full fishtank stop a shotgun blast? Can you survive two identical, simultaneous explosions by standing halfway between them?
244	8	"Rocketman" "Rocketmen"	February 20, 2016	265
Myths tested: Can gummy bears and feces be used as alternative rocket fuels?
245	9	"Reddit Special"	February 27, 2016	266
Myths tested: Will a flatus show up on a thermal imaging camera? Can you survive a fall from a chopper by climbing into a zorb ball? Is it really easy to punch your way out of a paper bag?
246	10	"Grand Finale" "The MythBusters Grand Finale"	March 5, 2016	267
Adam and Jamie end the show with two grand explosions, a dedication to Buster, and the destruction of past props using a truck ram.
247	11	"Reunion" "MythBusters: The Reunion"	March 5, 2016	268
Adam and Jamie invite Grant, Tory, and Kari back to reflect on the history of the show and what it meant to them.
248	12	"Duct Tape: The Return"	March 6, 2016	269
Myths tested: Can you build a working trebuchet held together only by duct tape? Can a seat belt made from duct tape save your life in a car crash? Note: This episode aired on Science. This is the final episode of the original series, and also marked the final appearance of Jamie Hyneman. Adam Savage would return in 2019's Mythbusters Jr..

== Episode 237 – "MythBusters Revealed" ==
- Original air date: January 2, 2016

Adam and Jamie provide a behind-the-scenes look at the upcoming season, from brainstorming sessions for episode themes to test planning and execution. Footage from past episodes is shown, along with clips of the following myths and episodes to be featured during this season.

Myth/Episode	Description
Drifting on Dirt	Is the drift technique the best way to drive on a dirt road?
Truck Wedge	No description given
Tank Car Crush	Is it possible to collapse a railroad tank car by filling it with steam and cooling it quickly?
"Reddit Special"	Episode dedicated to testing myths suggested by fans who use Reddit
Rocketmen	Can unconventional fuels be used to power a rocket?
Landmine Lunacy	Can a person use a hovercraft to traverse a minefield safely?
"Duct Tape: The Return"	Unusual uses for duct tape, including a trebuchet
"Explosion Special"	Explosion-based myths, including one more scenario based on the television series MacGyver
Car Lift	Can a giant vacuum lift a car off the ground?
What Is Bombproof?	Can a person survive two identical, simultaneous explosions by standing exactly halfway between them?
Pancake Car	Can a powerful explosion completely flatten a car?
Queue Theory	What is the most efficient method for customers to line up at a store checkout counter?
Axe vs. Gun Revisit	A revisit of the "Axe vs. Gun" zombie myth from 2013
"MythBusters: The Reunion"	A look back at the series’ history, with appearances by the Build Team of Tory Belleci, Kari Byron, and Grant Imahara

== Episode 238 – "The Explosion Special" ==
- Original air date: January 9, 2016

In this episode, Adam and Jamie test two more explosion related myths.

=== MacGyver Cement Truck ===
Myth	Status	Notes
If a mail truck containing a bomb is filled with wet cement, the explosion will not injure bystanders or completely destroy the truck. Based on a scene from the television series MacGyver.	Busted	From analyzing the scene, Adam and Jamie determined that 84 pounds (38 kg) of dynamite had been used. They set up a mail truck with the explosive and positioned a police car at the same distance as the scene, with a plywood cutout to represent MacGyver standing behind it. To gauge shrapnel injuries, they surrounded the truck with more cutouts at a distance of 30 feet (9.1 m); they also placed sensors at distances up to 250 feet (76 m) to obtain pressure readings. A control test with an empty truck shredded the cutouts and broke the sensor cables, throwing shrapnel as far as 675 feet (206 m). For the second test, they secured the dynamite to a wood frame in the cargo compartment and began to load in 32,000 pounds (15,000 kg) of cement. When some of the dynamite came loose and began to float up, Adam cut a hole in the back wall of the driver's cab and climbed in to re-secure it. As cement began to leak out around the back doors, they set off the explosion and were amazed to see all the cutouts intact, with the truck's side and roof panels peeling away from the frame. However, they discovered that only a small quantity of the dynamite had exploded, due to the weight of the cement dislodging the primer cord intended to set it off. For a final test, they put the dynamite in a sealed plywood box before loading the cement in order to ensure that it would all explode. The blast caused the cement to shoot upward in a jet, destroyed the truck, and left a shallow crater in the ground underneath. Debris was thrown to a maximum of 250 feet (76 m), less than the control test, but the cutouts were knocked down and peppered with small shrapnel holes. Adam and Jamie classified the myth as busted, noting that although the cement redirected the shock wave of the blast, it did not protect the truck or bystanders.

=== Hovercraft Hijinks ===
Myth	Status	Notes
It is possible to cross a minefield safely using a hovercraft.	Confirmed	After taking hovercraft lessons for land and water maneuvering, Adam and Jamie built 20 pressure-sensitive landmines to deliver a blast of compressed air and debris when triggered. They then set up a minefield, 50 feet (15 m) by 80 feet (24 m), with the mines laid out in an S-curve to ensure that a straight run down its length would cross most of them. Adam tested an anti-personnel trigger setting of 35 pounds (16 kg) by walking the field blindfolded, and Jamie tested an anti-vehicle setting of 300 pounds (140 kg) by driving a jeep through it. Each man hit and triggered several mines during his run. Jamie then drove the hovercraft across the field and back, but did not set off any of the mines. When they were reset to anti-personnel mode, Adam was unable to set them off as well; Jamie then made one last run with the triggers at 5 pounds (2.3 kg) and completed it safely. With the hovercraft's weight distributed over a large enough area to avoid setting off the mines, they declared the myth confirmed.

== Episode 239 – "Tanker Crush" ==
- Original air date: January 16, 2016

Adam and Jamie devote the entire episode to testing a single railroad disaster myth.

=== Tanker Crush ===
Myth	Status	Notes
A railroad tank car can collapse if filled with steam and sealed, due to a partial vacuum being generated inside as the steam condenses.	Busted	For a demonstration, Adam added a small amount of boiling water to a 1-US-gallon (3.8 L) metal can, screwed on the cap, and allowed it to cool. The can slowly buckled, and he and Jamie repeated the test with a 55-US-gallon (210 L) drum; after more than 20 minutes, the container's side walls suddenly collapsed. They performed a third test, fitting the drum with a vacuum gauge and temperature sensor, and recorded a time to failure of 8 minutes, a peak vacuum of 16 inches of mercury (54 kPa), and a temperature drop from 195 °F (91 °C) to 170 °F (77 °C). When another drum was steam-cleaned to heat it to 203 °F (95 °C), it took 16 minutes to fail; the peak vacuum was 17.5 inches of mercury (59 kPa), and the buckling was more pronounced. Adam and Jamie then built a small-scale tank car from drums, steam cleaned it to 200 °F (93 °C), and observed a collapse at 11 inches of mercury (37 kPa) vacuum in a shorter time than the single-drum tests. At a railroad depot in Boardman, Oregon, they set up a decommissioned tank car, 67 feet (20 m) long and 10 feet (3.0 m) in diameter with 0.5-inch (13 mm) thick steel walls, for a full-scale trial. After Adam inspected the interior to verify that it was in good condition, they sealed the release valves and attached a vacuum gauge and temperature sensors. The car was steam-cleaned for 3 hours, reaching 209 °F (98 °C), after which the steam was shut off, the hatch was sealed, and a fire monitor nozzle began to spray water over the car as simulated rain. The vacuum readings peaked at 27 inches of mercury (91 kPa) as the car cooled to 100 °F (38 °C), but no collapse had occurred after 60 minutes and they ended the test at that point. Theorizing that internal damage or corrosion could make collapse more likely, Adam and Jamie obtained a second, older car. For this test, instead of using steam and the water spray, they set up an industrial vacuum to pump the car down to the same level as in the first trial. Again, the car remained intact after 60 minutes, so they vented it to the atmosphere and dropped a 3,200-pound (1,500 kg) concrete block on it from 30 feet (9.1 m) to investigate the effect of physical damage. When the car was pumped down again, it underwent total collapse at 23 inches of mercury (78 kPa). Adam and Jamie declared the myth busted, saying that tank cars are designed to withstand severe conditions unless badly damaged.

== Episode 240 – "Cooking Chaos" ==
- Original air date: January 23, 2016

Adam and Jamie put two food-related viral videos to the test.

=== Instant Shrimp ===
Myth	Status	Notes
It is possible to launch raw shrimp through clouds of flour, raw eggs, bread crumbs, and fire and have them land, perfectly cooked, on a plate.	Busted	Jamie chose a multi-barreled air cannon to propel the shrimp and built a pneumatic sprayer for the eggs, and Adam designed nozzles to launch and disperse the flour and bread crumbs. The final element was a rig designed to generate a burst of flame that would expose the shrimp to a temperature of 500 °F (260 °C). They set up their equipment in a hangar at Mare Island Naval Shipyard, spaced apart as in the source video and using a target of bubble wrap. The first several shrimp they launched disintegrated shortly after leaving the cannon barrel, but fitting them into a paper ketchup cup to act as a sabot allowed them to travel downrange intact. Once they corrected their aim to hit the target consistently, they measured a flight time of 392 milliseconds and adjusted the timing on the other elements. The shrimp they launched hit each element as in the video, but none were properly coated or cooked. When they replaced the flame rig with a 3-foot (0.91 m) long sword forge running at 2,100 °F (1,150 °C) and fired a fully prepared shrimp directly through it, they found that its temperature still had not increased significantly. The same result occurred with a 12-foot (3.7 m) long forge, prompting them to declare the myth busted as the shrimp did not have enough time to absorb the heat needed for cooking.

=== Smoothie Blast ===
Myth	Status	Notes
The shock wave of an underwater explosion can liquefy the interior of a piece of fruit without harming its skin or peel.	Plausible	At the bomb range, Adam and Jamie built a blast-proof box and filled it with water. They then positioned the fruit and explosive charge (a shrink-wrapped tomato and a blasting cap) as in the source video, 7 inches (18 cm) apart. After they set it off, Jamie was able to insert a straw in the undamaged skin and suck out a mouthful of juice, while Adam was unable to draw any from an intact one. Further tests revealed that smaller gaps between the tomato and the cap increased the juice yield; a gap as small as 1.5 inches (3.8 cm) left the skin intact, while a gap of 0.5 inches (13 mm) destroyed it. Before visiting the range, Adam and Jamie had run a tomato through an industrial juicer at the shop and obtained a 62% juice yield based on its original weight. They measured a 33% yield upon draining the juice out of the tomato at 1.5 inches (3.8 cm) with a vacuum pump. To investigate the use of larger quantities of explosive, they set up a new trial at a quarry pond, placing 20 pounds (9.1 kg) of TNT underwater at a depth of 10 feet (3.0 m). They then placed mesh bags containing one each of oranges, cucumbers, tomatoes, and pineapples at distances from 2 feet (0.61 m) to 40 feet (12 m), at a depth of 15 feet (4.6 m). Any samples not scattered in the explosion were either ruptured or tenderized, but Adam and Jamie were unable to obtain any juice. They deemed the myth plausible, and Jamie noted that the use of the small box allowed the shock wave from the explosion to reflect back and forth from the walls, repeatedly striking the tomato and more effectively delivering energy to it.

== Episode 241 – "Driven to Destruction" ==
- Original air date: January 30, 2016

Adam and Jamie test two myths intended to send cars in opposite directions.

=== Pancake Car ===
Myth	Status	Notes
It is possible to flatten a car using explosives.	Busted	In the workshop, Jamie built a rough car model by welding together empty 1-US-gallon (3.8 L) steel cans and piping, to accurately reflect the scaled down thickness of steel body panels. At the bomb range, he and Adam set the model on the ground, sandwiched it between two steel plates, and placed a layer of detasheet explosive on the top plate to drive it downward. The explosion crushed the model to a height of approximately 1 inch (2.5 cm), or 1/5 of its original height. Further testing with more plates and explosive both above and below the model either tore the model to pieces or melted portions of it. However, a repeat of the first test with 50% more explosive gave results that Jamie considered satisfactory. For full-scale testing, they traveled to the New Mexico Institute of Mining and Technology and placed a car on a steel plate, with a second plate suspended directly above it. This plate weighed 7,000 pounds (3,200 kg) and was loaded with 1,000 pounds (450 kg) of ANFO. The resulting explosion tore the car to pieces, threw pieces of the support frame up to 500 feet (150 m) in the air, and cracked or broke windows of cars that were well away from the site. Adam and Jamie found that the blast had punched through the upper plate, generating shrapnel that destroyed the car. They deemed the myth busted, with Jamie commenting that a plate thick enough to withstand the blast would be heavy enough to crush the car simply by being dropped on it.

=== Car Lift ===
Myth	Status	Notes
A standard household vacuum cleaner can generate enough suction to lift a car.	Confirmed	Adam and Jamie decided to build an attachment that would increase the area exposed to the vacuum's suction. They found that the standard hose could lift a 5-pound (2.3 kg) weight, generating a minimum suction of 2.8 pounds per square inch (19 kPa) based on its cross-sectional area. After building a suction cup 8 inches (20 cm) in diameter and attaching it, they were able to lift a 50-pound (23 kg) weight and believed that it could have taken a higher load. Based on this result, they built 40 such cups, attached to a steel frame that would be lifted by a crane. They set up their equipment on Treasure Island, placing the cups (total area 1,880 square inches (1.21 m^{2})) on the hood, roof, and trunk of a 2,800-pound (1,300 kg) car. When they started the vacuum and began to lift the frame, the car fell off due to excessive buckling of the hood that caused its cups to pop loose. A second test with a different arrangement of the cups also failed; after replacing the hood with a flat piece of sheet steel to eliminate the buckling, they were able to lift the car 1 inch (2.5 cm) off the ground before it fell. Returning to the shop, they decided to replace the suction cups with three large plywood boxes, contoured to match the car's shape and fitted with rubber gaskets for a tight seal. The three boxes had a combined area of 4,000 square inches (2.6 m^{2}) and were equipped with vacuum gauges, which registered readings higher than 6 inches of mercury (20 kPa) when a new test was started at Treasure Island. This time, the car remained attached to the boxes even while being lifted to the crane's maximum height, after which Adam and Jamie shut off the vacuum cleaner's power. The car crashed to the ground, demonstrating that the crane was not directly attached to the car and had thus played no part in keeping it aloft, and they declared the myth confirmed.

== Episode 242 – "Volunteer Special" ==
- Original air date: February 6, 2016

Adam and Jamie tackle two myths requiring large amounts of volunteer help.

=== Axe vs. Gun Revisit ===
Myth	Status	Notes
An axe is a more effective weapon against a horde of zombies than a gun. A revisit of the "Axe vs. Gun" myth from 2013.	Re-Confirmed	Adam noted that fans had complained about his method for counting kills in the original test, by simply touching the blade of his foam axe to their heads without using the force needed to deliver a lethal blow. To calibrate his foam axe for the re-test, he attached an accelerometer to a real axe and struck a model head (fabricated from ballistic gelatin and an embedded simulaid skull) with increasing force until the skull fractured. This occurred with a swing arc of 120 degrees and a blade speed of 7.8 metres per second (26 ft/s). The foam axe was fitted with weights to match the heft of the real one, and the accelerometer was attached with added electronics to give audio/visual signals of successful or failed kills. They set up their battleground as before, with a "human zone" circle 30 feet (9.1 m) in diameter and 190 volunteers coming in from all sides as a zombie horde. The defender could not engage the zombies until they had entered the circle. Using the axe, Adam registered 8 kills before being overrun as opposed to 14 in the first test. Jamie scored 7 kills with a semiautomatic paintball pistol, the same result he had previously achieved using a pump-action shotgun. They then investigated a scenario in which all of the zombies were attacking from one direction – initially through a single gap in a fence, but with a larger gap being opened after a set period of time. Adam killed 67 zombies in this test, while Jamie (using multiple paintball weapons that occasionally jammed or misfired) scored 57 kills. Declaring the myth confirmed at this point, they decided to investigate the effectiveness of a chainsaw against the zombies. Adam created an appropriately-weighted safe mockup for testing, with a switch on the blade to measure total contact time (with 0.75 seconds taken as the minimum needed for a kill). With the zombies again coming through the fence, he was able to kill all 190 of them.

=== MythBustStore ===
Myth	Status	Notes
In a grocery store, the standard method of letting shoppers choose a checkout counter is not as efficient as a single long "serpentine" line that routes each shopper to the next available checkout.	Busted	Adam and Jamie set up a store in an empty hangar, with fully stocked shelves and 5 checkout counters, and recruited 120 volunteers for the test. Upon entering the store, each volunteer received play money and a shopping list of items to purchase, and took a shopping cart or basket. Once they had gathered the items, they would record the times at which they entered a checkout line and reached a counter. A percentage of shoppers were secretly instructed to ask for a price check on an item or pay with a check, behaviors intended to slow the lines down. After checking out, they would indicate their overall satisfaction with the experience on a 5-point scale. Experienced cashiers were on duty at the cash registers, and a statistics team was present to record and tabulate the data. When all 120 shoppers entered the store for a trial run, the lines became unmanageably long after 10 minutes. A second trial run, with only 90 shoppers in the store at any given time, gave more reasonable lines. Each of the actual tests lasted 30 minutes, but the start was delayed until shoppers had been inside the store for at least 5 minutes, in order to allow for lines to build up and obtain realistic times. The standard test gave averages of 5:39 and 3.48 for the wait times and satisfaction scores, respectively, while the serpentine test yielded averages of 6:56 and 3.80. However, the spread of individual times was much narrower for the serpentine than the standard test. Adam said that the variations in speed of the individual lines were averaged out for the serpentine, resulting in fewer shoppers being dissatisfied due to long waits in slow lines. He and Jamie judged the myth as busted based on average time, but noted that the serpentine had advantages in other respects.

== Episode 243 – "Failure Is Not an Option!" ==
- Original air date: February 13, 2016

Adam and Jamie revisit three past myths based on comments and complaints from fans.

=== Drift Turn ===
Myth	Status	Notes
On a dirt road, a driver can always turn corners faster by drifting than by using standard driving techniques. A revisit from 2014.	Busted	Adam and Jamie laid out a 2-mile (3.2 km) dirt road course and each drove two laps. Jamie recorded times of 2:24 and 2:22 without drifting or losing traction, while Adam's times with drifting were 2:24 and 2:23. They noted that Adam fell behind Jamie on sharp turns due to a loss of traction, while the reverse was true on gentle turns because Jamie lost more momentum. The inconclusive results led them to judge the myth busted.

=== What Is Bulletproof? ===
Myth	Status	Notes
A metal cigarette lighter can stop a bullet under the proper circumstances. Based on the results of the first "What Is Bulletproof?" test in 2004.	Plausible	Adam and Jamie set up a ballistic gelatin torso dummy and attached a lighter over the heart. They then fired a .22 rifle directly at it, using full metal jacket rounds with a muzzle velocity of 1,440 feet per second (440 m/s). The bullet punched through the lighter and penetrated nearly to the back of the dummy, embedding shreds of the lighter's cotton wick in the wound. Thinking that a ricochet might affect the results, they set up a concrete paving stone to bounce the bullet into a cardboard target and shot at it from different angles (45, 25, and 15 degrees). The 45-degree shot missed the target, the 25-degree shot broke into fragments before striking, and the 15-degree shot both remained intact and hit the target. With the dummy in place and the lighter positioned at the impact point from this last shot, they fired again and hit the lighter. However, the bullet only dented the housing and ricocheted away, prompting them to classify the myth as plausible.
A 30-US-gallon (110 L) fishtank full of water can protect a person standing behind it from a shotgun blast.	Confirmed	Adam and Jamie set up a glass-walled fishtank, placed a dummy torso behind its width, and fired three different types of ammunition from a 12-gauge shotgun: birdshot, buckshot, and a deer slug. The dummy remained intact through all three tests. In the birdshot test, the pellets lost so much of their energy upon entering the water that they could not break the back wall; only the shock wave of their passage shattered it. The buckshot lost even more energy, and the back wall remained unbroken. Although the deer slug passed through both walls, it became severely deformed and was deflected away from the dummy as it emerged.

=== What Is Bombproof? ===
Myth	Status	Notes
A person can survive two identical, simultaneous explosions by standing exactly halfway between them, due to the shock waves from opposite directions canceling each other out.	Busted	Adam and Jamie chose to set up the explosions on the surface of a quarry lake in order to be able to clearly see the shock waves on the water. Adam built an 8-foot (2.4 m) long platform and fitted it with seven pressure sensors at 1-foot (0.30 m) intervals, and he and Jamie set it and a 5-pound (2.3 kg) charge of TNT on the lake. The charge was placed 5 feet (1.5 m) from one end of the platform and 3 feet (0.91 m) above the water surface. When they set it off, they recorded readings decreasing from 135 pounds per square inch (930 kPa) to 25 pounds per square inch (170 kPa), with 50 pounds per square inch (340 kPa) at the midpoint of the platform. A second test, with two TNT charges set 5 feet (1.5 m) from opposite ends, gave a reading of 100 pounds per square inch (690 kPa) at the midpoint. Based on this result, they judged the myth busted; Jamie noted that the pressure fronts from the two explosions reinforced each other instead of canceling out.

== Episode 244 – "Rocketman" ==
- Original air date: February 20, 2016

Adam and Jamie investigate alternative rocket fuels.

=== Rocketmen ===
Myth	Status	Notes
A rocket can be fueled with gummy bears.	Plausible	Adam and Jamie built a "hybrid" rocket 7 feet (2.1 m) in length and 4 inches (10 cm) in diameter, with an engine that sprayed liquid oxygen into a chamber containing the solid fuel ("fuel grain"). They prepared fuel grains by three different methods: hand-packing the gummy bears, melting them down and pouring them in, and boiling off as much water as possible to generate a concentrated syrup that would solidify after being poured in. Boiling the gummy bears at 250 °F (121 °C) overnight yielded a rubbery sludge; when Adam heated another batch to 305 °F (152 °C), the glass pan he was using shattered on the burner but did not injure anyone. A second attempt with a metal pail allowed him to complete the preparation safely. With the help of a rocketry club, Adam and Jamie set up their rockets at a testing range and attempted to launch them. None of the three engines resulted in liftoff, and the hand-packed gummy bears melted and fell out of the fuel grain. A second test with the boiled fuel, adding a charge of gunpowder to promote ignition, also failed to lift off. When they used a fuel grain loaded with standard paraffin-based rocket fuel, they did achieve liftoff but recorded a maximum height of 675 feet (206 m), well short of the expected 20,000 feet (6,100 m). This result led them to believe that their rocket design was faulty, and they returned to the shop to devise a new one. They abandoned the hybrid rocket in favor of one with a solid-fuel engine and a total length of 8 feet (2.4 m). Adam boiled the gummy bears, ground the residue to powder, and sent it to a rocketry expert to be incorporated into an engine. At the range, they performed two launches with standard fuel as a control test, achieving maximum altitudes of 4,133 feet (1,260 m) feet with wind and 4,491 feet (1,369 m) without it. A launch with the boiled gummy bears was successful and gave an altitude of 3,691 feet (1,125 m). They classified the fuel as plausible, with Adam noting that although the fuel was usable, it would not be as efficient as standard ones in transporting payloads into space.
A rocket can be fueled with feces.	Plausible	Jamie considered the possibility that astronauts might be able to use their own bodily waste for practical purposes. He dried a batch of dog feces in the sun on the shop roof, ground them down, and sent the powder to be made into a solid-fuel engine. The launch reached a peak of 2,900 feet (880 m). Adam and Jamie judged the feces as a plausible fuel, noting that it was a renewable resource and gave adequate performance compared to standard fuels.

== Episode 245 – "Reddit Special" ==
- Original air date: February 27, 2016

Adam and Jamie test three myths submitted by Reddit users.

=== Farting on FLIR ===
Myth	Status	Notes
A flatus can be seen using thermal imaging technology. Based on a viral video.	Busted	Adam built a flatus generator, designed to emit a burst of air from a whoopee cushion held within a water bath at body temperature, and Jamie set up a thermal camera. When Adam triggered the generator, though, the camera registered nothing except a slight heating of the cushion's nozzle. They judged the myth as busted and explained how the original video could have been faked: by triggering a container of compressed gas hidden between a person's legs, which would cool upon entering the atmosphere and appear on the camera.

=== Ball Fall ===
Myth	Status	Notes
A person who falls out of a helicopter while inside an inflatable zorb ball can survive the impact and walk away uninjured.	Busted	Adam and Jamie attached "shock watch" stickers to Buster, calibrated to register impacts of 50, 75, and 100 g. With Jamie watching from the ground, Adam rode with Buster in a helicopter up to an altitude of 1,000 feet (300 m) and dropped a sandbag to ensure that he could hit the target zone. Adam then kicked an unprotected Buster out of the cabin hatch as a control run. Buster hit the ground at an estimated 120 miles per hour (190 km/h), tripping all the stickers and indicating fatal injuries. Adam and Jamie then loaded Buster into the ball and suspended him from the helicopter by a tether with a quick-release catch. When Adam dropped Buster from the same height in this trial, his impact velocity was reduced to 56 miles per hour (90 km/h), but all the stickers were tripped again. A final attempt, with several bundles of bubble wrap inside the ball to cushion Buster, gave the same results; in addition, some of the bundles were dislodged and Buster sank to the bottom of the ball's internal cavity. Adam and Jamie called the myth busted, since none of the impacts were survivable.

=== Paper Bag Punch ===
Myth	Status	Notes
It is easy to punch one's way out of a paper grocery bag.	Confirmed	Jamie put together a bag tall enough for Adam to stand in and wide enough that he could only punch it in one direction at a time. Adam set up a load cell to determine the force needed to break through a layer of paper. When the paper was held in place, he needed 35 pounds-force (160 N) to break it; however, with the paper left hanging free, he was unable to deliver more than 0.5 pounds-force (2.2 N) because it swung away on contact. After taking lessons on punching techniques at a boxing gym, Adam was able to deliver a maximum of 593 pounds-force (2,640 N) with his punch. The giant bag was placed upside down over him, and he made three attempts to punch his way out as quickly as possible while wearing boxing gloves. He recorded times of 1:22, 1:04, and 1:14; during each trial, the paper repeatedly crumpled and wrinkled under his strikes until it had fatigued enough to let him break through. A fourth trial without the gloves gave a time of 2 seconds, due to the force of his punches being concentrated over the smaller area of his bare knuckles. This last result led him and Jamie to declare the myth confirmed.

=== Snoo Boom ===
Myth	Status	Notes
Combination of two requests: detonate a glitter bomb, and blow up the Reddit mascot Snoo.	Requests fulfilled	For the episode finale, Adam and Jamie set up a giant inflatable Snoo at the bomb range, packed it with 300 feet (91 m) of detonating cord and bags filled with paint/glitter, and set it off.

== Episode 246 – "Grand Finale" ==
- Original air date: March 5, 2016

Adam and Jamie look back on their time hosting the show and devise four grand-scale sendoffs.

=== RV Blast ===
Event	Notes
Film an explosion at 50,000 frames per second.	At the New Mexico Institute of Mining and Technology, Adam and Jamie loaded 855 pounds (388 kg) of ANFO into a recreational vehicle. They set off the charge and filmed the blast at 50,000 frames per second, five times the fastest rate they had previously used. The RV was torn to shreds, with a few chunks of debris found scattered over the site, and they marveled at the light and shock wave generated by the explosion.

=== Truck Wedge ===
Event	Notes
Revisit "Traffic Ram" (2014) by building a new wedge onto a truck and driving it through equipment used throughout the show's entire run.	On the runway of Naval Air Station Alameda, Adam set up a 1-mile (1.6 km) course incorporating 60 cars and over 200 props used in the testing of various myths, arranged in chronological order from 2003 to 2016. Meanwhile, at the shop, Jamie designed and built a cowcatcher-style wedge, heavier than the one used in "Traffic Ram", to be mounted on a truck's front end. With Jamie watching, Adam drove a test run parallel to the course to verify that the truck and wedge could operate safely at high speeds. He then ran the course, reaching a speed of 45 miles per hour (72 km/h) before hitting the first obstacle of 20 cars arranged in two parallel rows. He reached the end successfully, noting that the wedge threw debris to either side and kept him from getting bogged down.

=== Bye Bye Buster ===
Event	Notes
Give Buster a superhero farewell.	At New Mexico Institute of Mining and Technology, they dressed Buster in a superhero costume and welded him onto a rocket sled. Ten engines were attached, to generate a maximum thrust of 56,200 pounds-force (250,000 N), and a cinderblock wall was set up 1,000 feet (300 m) away at the end of the track. Buster achieved a top speed of 780 miles per hour (1,260 km/h) during the run and disintegrated on impact with the wall, with the sled smashing through it. Adam later salvaged parts of Buster's remains and made them into souvenirs for himself, Jamie, and the Build Team.

=== Cement Truck ===
Event	Notes
Set off the biggest explosion in the show's history.	Adam and Jamie chose to re-create the finale of "Cement Mix-Up" (2005), loading a cement truck with 5,001 pounds (2,268 kg) of ANFO and setting it off. The blast left a crater in the bomb range and threw shrapnel in all directions. This explosion used one more pound of ANFO than the one at the end of "Homemade Diamonds" (2009), which had previously been the largest one depicted on the show.

== Episode 247 – "Reunion" ==
- Original air date: March 5, 2016

Adam, Jamie, and the Build Team (Tory Belleci, Kari Byron, and Grant Imahara) gather to reminisce about their time working together.

Topic	Notes
How the Build Team members started on the show, and their early experiences on camera	
Favorite myths	Adam/Jamie: "Lead Balloon" (2008); Tory: "Supersize Cruise Ship Waterskiing" (2007); Grant/Tory: "Blue Ice" (2011); Kari: "Racing Gravity" (2009)—she found out she was pregnant after this test ended
Stressful moments on the set	All: The first attempt to test "Cannonball Chemistry" in 2011; Kari's worst day: "The Smell of Fear" (2012)—being covered with scorpions Tory's worst: His multiple injuries on camera Grant/Adam's worst: Vomiting on camera
All the abuse Buster suffered during myth testing	Adam gave everyone fragments from both Buster's final remains and the many cameras destroyed during filming
Favorite scientific moments	Grant: "Red Rag to a Bull" (2007); Adam: "Bullets Fired Up" (2006)—the only myth to receive all three classifications: Busted, Plausible, Confirmed; Jamie: "Drain Disaster" (2011)
Favorite explosion	Adam: "Exploding Water Heater" (2007); Kari: Air-fuel explosions Jamie: Trying to use an explosion for a constructive purpose
Impact of the show on the lives of others	Jamie read a letter from a viewer who decided to pursue undergraduate and graduate degrees in engineering as a result of watching the show
Ability of the group to gain access to an increasing range of facilities over time	Adam: "U-2 Flight" (2015)—being able to train for and take an actual flight
The work that went into designing and building equipment for myth testing	
Situations that put the group in genuine peril	Grant: "Sawdust Cannon" (2008)—the fireball that resulted when a load of powdered creamer was used in the cannon Tory: "Carried Away" (2004)—police were called in while the crew was shooting out helium balloons with a BB gun Kari/Tory: "Seconds from Disaster" (2014)—filming the intro, which involved Tory tossing a fake bomb to Kari, and being interrupted by the police Adam: "Underwater Car" (2007), with a comment from a woman who saved herself and her daughter from drowning based on the results of this myth
Effect of the show on popular culture	Congratulatory message from United States President Barack Obama, with comments from celebrities and notable scientific figures spread throughout the remainder of the episode

== Episode 248 – "Duct Tape: The Return" ==
- Original air date: March 6, 2016 (Science)

Adam and Jamie explore two last uses for their favorite all-purpose adhesive.

=== Duct Tape Trebuchet ===
Myth	Status	Notes
It is possible to build a fully operational trebuchet held together only by duct tape.	Confirmed	Adam built a small-scale model trebuchet and fine-tuned its design to achieve a good throwing range, and Jamie investigated methods for holding the device together with duct tape and building the needed sling and ropes from it. Once they had a working set of prototypes, they began a full-scale assembly at a field in Altamont, California. The final trebuchet used 78 rolls of tape in strand/layer/wrapping form, 2,600 pounds (1,200 kg) of lumber, and a 750-pound (340 kg) automobile engine block as the counterweight. A test shot with a watermelon as the projectile achieved a range of 171 feet (52 m). Except for a failure of one of the ropes holding up the counterweight, the structure remained intact. To confirm the feasibility of using their trebuchet in combat, they then launched a lit Molotov cocktail to a distance of over 100 feet (30 m), and finally hit and ignited a giant inflatable shark set up at that same distance.

=== Duct Tape Seat Belt ===
Myth	Status	Notes
A seat belt made from duct tape can save a driver from injury in an accident.	Busted	On an airport runway in Tracy, California, Adam and Jamie set up a crash target consisting of two side-by-side shipping containers, reinforced with steel plates. They broke the windows out of a car and cut an opening in the roof to give clear overhead/side views of the interior, then put two dummies equipped with accelerometers in the front seats. Buster, the driver, was restrained with a seat belt made of the greatest thickness of duct tape that would pass through the standard buckles (9 layers at the lap, 6 at the shoulder). The passenger dummy was secured with a standard belt for comparison. As Adam watched from overhead in a boom lift, Jamie towed the car into the target at a speed of 25 miles per hour (40 km/h). The passenger experienced forces of 30 g (head) and 51 g (body), indicating survival with some injuries. Buster's belt snapped at the shoulder, causing him to hit the steering wheel with forces of 136 g (head) and 133 g (body), high enough to be fatal. Declaring the myth busted, they taped Buster to the seat, frame, and body of the car with multiple wrappings and repeated the test. The passenger results were similar to the first trial (34 g head, 45 g body); however, Buster's readings decreased to survivable levels of 41 g and 55 g, and he remained in his seat even though most of the wrappings broke in different places. For the third and final test, Adam used 40 layers of tape to hold Buster in place, and the crash occurred at 40 miles per hour (64 km/h). The tape did not break, but Buster sustained lethal forces of 85 g (head) and 311 g (body). The passenger's belt proved to be faulty, and the head of that dummy hit the windshield with 475 g of force, indicating death. Adam and Jamie noted that the tape around Buster held him so firmly in place that he experienced the same deceleration as the entire car, leading to his fatal result.
