= MythBusters (2018 season) =

- No. of episodes: 8

Release
- Original network: Science Channel
- Original release: January 3 – February 28, 2018

Season chronology
- ← Previous; 2017 season Next →

The cast of the television series MythBusters perform experiments to verify or debunk urban legends, old wives' tales, and the like. This is a list of the various myths tested on the show as well as the results of the experiments (the myth is either busted, plausible, or confirmed). The 2018 season premiered on January 3, in a Wednesday time slot, and is the last season of the show to date, with Adam Savage returning the following year in MythBusters Jr.

== Episode overview ==
| No. overall | No. in season | Title | Original release date | Overall episode No. |
|---|---|---|---|---|
| 255 | 1 | "Fire Arrow vs. Gas Tank" "Fiery Arrow vs. Gas Tank" | January 3, 2018 | 276 |
Myths tested: Will a car explode if shot in the gas tank with a fire arrow? Will the tribal initiation of shooting arrows straight up make them return to earth at lethal speeds?
| 256 | 2 | "Pane in the Glass" | January 10, 2018 | 277 |
Myths tested: Can you jump off a building holding a rope, swing back, and shoot out a window to return to a lower floor? Do old remedies prevent you from crying when cutting onions?
| 257 | 3 | "Wild Wild West" | January 17, 2018 | 278 |
Myths tested: In a gunfight is it better to take time to aim carefully, or just fire as rapidly as possible? From the film Jonah Hex (2010), will a semi-automatic dynamite-firing crossbow actually work?
| 258 | 4 | "Spike in the Road" "Geezer Geyser" | January 24, 2018 | 279 |
Myths tested: Can police road spikes be defeated? Can a high powered Vegas water fountain levitate a drunken old geezer riding an inflatable pool tube?
| 259 | 5 | "Dynamite Deposit" | January 31, 2018 | 280 |
Myths tested: Can a bomb left in a safe blow the door without damaging the dollar bills? Do people choose dogs that look like them?
| 260 | 6 | "Backseat Getaway Driver" "Knock Me Over with a Feather" | February 7, 2018 | 281 |
Myths tested: Can an escaping thief with broken legs drive a stolen car from the backseat using a walking cane? Is the idiom "knock me down with a feather" true?
| 261 | 7 | "Electrified Escape" | Unaired (US); February 21, 2018 (UK) | 282 |
Myths tested: Is it possible to escape from a burning car crashed into a power pole, without getting electrocuted? Is it better for a pedestrian to jump up when a car is about to hit them, or stand still?
| 262 | 8 | "Dropping a Bomb" | Unaired (US); February 28, 2018 (UK) | 283 |
Myths tested: Can dropping molten salt into a toilet unblock it? Is 3rd person perspective better than 1st person in a real world video game obstacle course?

== Episode 255 – "Fire Arrow vs. Gas Tank" ==
- Original air date: January 3, 2018

| Myth | Status | Notes |
|---|---|---|
| An arrow shot directly upwards will land with lethal speeds on the way down. | Confirmed | |
| A burning arrow shot into the gas tank of a car will lead to an explosion. | Busted | It took half an hour for the car to fully set alight. |

== Episode 256 – "Pane in the Glass" ==
- Original air date: January 10, 2018

| Myth | Status | Notes |
|---|---|---|
| A person can survive after jumping off the roof of a skyscraper, swing down several floors, and re-enter the building after shooting out a window pane. | Plausible | |
| Testing various remedies on preventing tears while chopping onions. | Plausible for spraying onions with lemon juice Busted for chewing gum while chopping Busted for freezing onions before chopping. | It was noted that lemon juice would ruin the taste of onions. |

== Episode 257 – "Wild Wild West" ==
- Original air date: January 17, 2018

| Myth | Status | Notes |
|---|---|---|
| When in a gunfight, it's better to take careful aim while shooting than just firing rapidly. | Confirmed with a pistol, but Busted with a rifle. | |
| A movie myth from Jonah Hex where the protagonist built a working semi-automatic crossbow that lights and shoots dynamite and does not kill the shooter. | Busted | The rig blew up, which would have killed the shooter. |

== Episode 258 – "Spike in the Road" ==
- Original air date: January 24, 2018

| Myth | Status | Notes |
|---|---|---|
| Police road spikes can be defeated. | Busted | Neither reinforced tires, nor power sliding worked. |
| A high powered Vegas water fountain can levitate someone riding an inflatable pool tube. | Busted | Both former The Search contestants Allen Pan and Tamara Robertson were brought in to assist in developing the full-scale rig, and no matter what they tried they couldn't get enough water pressure. Additionally, the geyser simply pushed the test subject to the side, and the uneven weight distribution skewed the efforts. |

== Episode 259 – "Dynamite Deposit" ==
- Original air date: January 31, 2018

| Myth | Status | Notes |
|---|---|---|
| A disguised time bomb deposited in a bank safe can blow the door without harming paper money. | Confirmed | Initially, there was too much explosives, but after it was toned down, it worked. |
| People choose dogs that look like them. | Busted | Success rate was around 10% for the 3 experiments. |

== Episode 260 – "Backseat Getaway Driver" ==
- Original air date: February 7, 2018

| Myth | Status | Notes |
|---|---|---|
| A thief jumping out of a tall building and breaking both legs can make a getaway from the backseat of a stolen car using a walking cane to press the accelerator and brake. | Plausible | |
| Testing the idiom "knock me down with a feather", ie, that someone can be in such a confused state that something as small as a feather can knock them over. | Confirmed | |

== Episode 261 – "Electrified Escape" ==
- Original US air date: Unaired
- Original UK air date: February 21, 2018

| Myth | Status | Notes |
|---|---|---|
| A person can escape a burning car crashed into a power pole and not get electrocuted, by shuffling along the road slowly. | Confirmed | |
| It is better for a pedestrian to jump up when a car is heading towards them, rather than standing still. | Plausible | |

== Episode 262 – "Dropping a Bomb" ==
- Original US air date: Unaired
- Original UK air date: February 28, 2018

| Myth | Status | Notes |
|---|---|---|
| 3rd-person perspective is better than 1st-person in a real-life video game obstacle course | Busted | It was normal eyesight vs. 3rd person VR headset |
| Dropping molten salt into a toilet will unblock it. | Busted | |
