= List of MythBusters pilot episodes =

- No. of episodes: 3 specials

Release
- Original network: Discovery Channel
- Original release: January 23 – March 7, 2003

Season chronology
- Next → 2003 season

The television series MythBusters cast perform experiments to verify or debunk urban legends, old wives' tales, and the like. This is a list of the various myths tested on the show as well as the results of the experiments (the myth is either busted, plausible, or confirmed).

== Episode overview ==
No. overall	No. in season	Title	Original release date	Overall episode No.
P1	Special–1	"Jet-Assisted Chevy"	January 23, 2003	1
Myths tested: Can a 1967 Chevy take off with JATO rockets, like in the tale of the JATO Rocket Car? Can Pop Rocks and soda, when eaten simultaneously, cause the eater's stomach to rupture? Note: The only cast are Adam Savage and Jamie Hyneman. Heather Joseph-Witham also makes her first appearance in this episode.
P2	Special–2	"Biscuit Bazooka"	January 23, 2003	2
Myths tested: Can an airplane toilet create enough suction to cause a person to become stuck on it? Can a can of biscuit dough explode in a hot car? Can a person throw himself through a skyscraper window? Note: This is the first appearance of Kari Byron.
P3	Special–3	"Poppy-Seed Drug Test"	March 7, 2003	3
Myths tested: Can a person take to the skies using only a lawn chair and weather balloons? Can someone test positive for heroin by eating a large number of poppy seeds? Can being painted with gold paint actually be deadly? Note: "Larry Lawn Chair Balloon" was the first myth the team ever tested.

== Episode P1 – "Jet-Assisted Chevy" ==
- Original air date: January 23, 2003

=== JATO Car ===
This myth was inspired by the Darwin Award-winning Arizona Dept. of Public Safety story about a former Air Force sergeant mounting a JATO rocket to a 1966 Chevrolet Impala and firing the rocket while at highway speed—80 miles per hour (130 km/h)—on a deserted road. It was also alleged that when at 300 miles per hour (480 km/h), he had to make a turn with a slight upgrade but burned out his brakes trying to stop, was launched into the air, and hit the side of a mountain.

Myth statement	Status	Notes
A car with a JATO rocket attached can speed up to 300 miles per hour (480 km/h), become airborne, and impact with the side of a cliff.	Busted	MythBusters JATO rocket car mount Adam and Jamie could not acquire real JATO rockets from the Air Force and instead used three amateur rocket motors of equivalent power to one JATO rocket. The rockets increased the speed of the car (a 1966 Chevrolet Impala) considerably. Although no speed measurement was made, the speed was clearly nowhere near the 300 mph suggested in the myth. The car also did not become airborne. This myth was revisited in the Supersized Myths special and tested a third time in the 2013 season premiere celebrating 10 years on the air.

=== Pop Rocks ===
This myth was inspired by the alleged death of Little Mikey of Life Cereals commercial fame—allegedly due to gastric rupture caused by an excess of carbon dioxide from a six-pack of soda and six pouches of Pop Rocks.

Myth statement	Status	Notes
Consuming large quantities of Pop Rocks and cola can cause one's stomach to explode.	Busted	Testing the myth using pig stomachs filled with hydrochloric acid to approximate a stomach's acid, Jamie and Adam found that not enough carbon dioxide was produced by the reaction to make a stomach explode. However, with six 12-US-fluid-ounce (350 ml) cans of cola and six packages of Pop Rocks, the subject would experience considerable pain (Jamie estimated the pig stomach that they used for the test tripled in size once the Pop Rocks and soda were added). This was also done at a special presentation at Rensselaer Polytechnic Institute. However, Jamie and Adam did note that there are documented cases of gastric rupture due to an excess of CO_{2} and did manage to blow another pig stomach by using acid, soda, and a larger-than-recommended quantity of sodium bicarbonate. Also, in a similar myth dealing with Diet Coke and Mentos, it was learned that the simple act of drinking the soda released most of the carbon dioxide in it, rendering the reaction between soda and Mentos (or Pop Rocks) much less powerful than normal.

== Episode P2 – "Biscuit Bazooka" ==
- Original air date: January 23, 2003

=== Stuck on You ===
This myth was inspired by a BBC and Reuters story about an obese woman flying on a Scandinavian Airlines System flight from Europe and getting stuck on the lavatory toilet due to suction, forcing the crew to land the plane while she was still on the toilet.

Myth statement	Status	Notes
An obese person can get stuck on an airline vacuum toilet.	Busted	Jamie and Adam replicated the circumstances with a used airplane toilet that has pressure on the ground as well as in the air and a weighed-down set of buttocks made of hot-melt vinyl to make it fleshy and soft and reinforced with wood. However, they were unable to get a perfect seal on a modern airplane toilet, even after removing the shroud to give the buttocks the best chance at sticking. They found a properly working toilet provides suction for only a few seconds, and even then, the 3-pound-per-square-inch (21 kPa) suction is not beyond human ability to overcome. Note: This is the first myth Kari Byron participated in testing, serving as the model for the buttocks, which were then supersized for the mold. (Remembered with new comments by Kari as part of the Top 25 Moments special episode in 2010.)

=== Biscuit Bullet ===
Myth statement	Status	Notes
A woman was struck in the head with an exploding tin of biscuit dough, believing that she was in fact struck by a bullet.	Plausible	The dough can blow out of many types of biscuit cans at a car's internal temperature of 150 °F (66 °C) with enough force to potentially strike the driver of the car in the back of the head, and has a texture and consistency when thawed that can be mistaken for brain matter by the average person. However, no one can actually verify the incident actually occurred. This myth has inspired two spin-off myths: Aerosol Bazooka and Biscuit Bazooka Spinoff.

=== Falling Lawyer ===
Myth statement	Status	Notes
A lawyer accidentally killed himself by running through the plate glass window of the 24th floor of his office building.	Confirmed	At a run speed of 5.7 miles per hour (9.2 km/h), a 160-pound (73 kg) subject was able to smash through a pressurized plate glass window. The incident was confirmed by a journalist to have actually occurred in Toronto, and the incident was awarded a Darwin Award. This incident was also featured in a segment of Spike TV's 1000 Ways to Die.

== Episode P3 – "Poppy-Seed Drug Test" ==
- Original air date: March 7, 2003

=== Lawn Chair Balloon ===
Myth statement	Status	Notes
In the Lawnchair Larry flight, Larry Walters flew a lawn chair by means of weather balloons, and he descended safely by means of an air gun.	Confirmed	Adam Savage went up in the MythBusters' rig, which was a lawn chair with 16 plastic weather balloons attached, and went up to the maximum height that could be obtained with the safety ropes attached, 75 feet (23 m). He safely descended by shooting out some of the balloons. The actual event behind the myth was verified by documents provided by the FAA.

=== Poppy Seed Drug Test ===
Myth statement	Status	Notes
Eating food with poppy seeds can cause a false positive when someone is drug-tested for heroin and/or opium.	Confirmed	Adam tested positive within half an hour of eating a large cake, while Jamie tested positive two hours after consuming three bagels. The two remained positive eight hours after ingestion, but they tested negative the next morning (about 18 hours). Heroin is a semi-synthetic opiate made from morphine. If a test is sensitive enough, it can generate a false positive simply by detecting the opium alkaloids from the seeds. Lawsuits have actually been filed and settled due to this phenomenon.

=== Goldfinger ===
Myth statement	Status	Notes
Covering one's body in gold paint can kill through skin asphyxiation, like in the James Bond movie Goldfinger.	Busted	After being covered in gold latex paint from head to toe for over an hour, Jamie reported a slight (and temporary) flu-like feeling and blood pressure increase of 20 mmHg (140/110), but he easily survived. He was denied permission by medical advisers to run on a treadmill, citing blood pressure and body temperature. The myth stated that the actress portraying the gold-plated woman in Goldfinger, Shirley Eaton, died as well, although her appearance in the episode busted that part of the myth. Because of the myth, Shirley Eaton was not fully covered in paint, and a section of her stomach was left unpainted, which was concealed as she lay on the bed. This myth was revisited in the 2004 "Myths Revisited" episode, and it echoes a similar aluminum-painted actor health scare included in the 2005 episode "Hollywood on Trial."
