= JATO Rocket Car =

Chain e-mail hoax

The account of the JATO Rocket Car was one of the original Darwin Awards winners: a man who supposedly spectacularly met his death after mounting a JATO unit (a rocket engine used to help heavy aircraft to take off) onto an ordinary automobile. It was originally circulated as a forwarded email.

In 1996, after numerous inquiries, the Arizona Department of Public Safety issued a news release posted on their website concerning the story. It termed the story "an Arizona myth."

The story was also debunked in 2003 on the pilot episode of MythBusters, titled "Jet Assisted Chevy".

This story was spun again by a satirical article on the Top Gear blog, with the twist that the remains of the car were found on Mars.

== Usenet posting ==
This is the text as it appears, possibly most frequently, in usenet repostings:

And this year's nominee is:

The Arizona Highway Patrol came upon a pile of smoldering metal embedded into the side of a cliff rising above the road at the apex of a curve. the wreckage resembled the site of an airplane crash, but it was a car. The type of car was unidentifiable at the scene. The lab finally figured out what it was and what had happened.

It seems that a guy had somehow gotten hold of a JATO unit (Jet Assisted Take Off – actually a solid fuel rocket) that is used to give heavy military transport planes an extra 'push' for taking off from short airfields. He had driven his Chevy Impala out into the desert and found a long, straight stretch of road. Then he attached the JATO unit to his car, jumped in, got up some speed and fired off the JATO!

The facts, as best could be determined, are that the operator of the 1967 Impala hit JATO ignition at a distance of approximately 3.0 miles [4.8 kilometers] from the crash site. This was established by the prominent scorched and melted asphalt at that location. The JATO, if operating properly, would have reached maximum thrust within five seconds, causing the Chevy to reach speeds well in excess of 350 MPH [560 km/h], continuing at full power for an additional 20–25 seconds. The driver, soon to be pilot, most likely would have experienced G-forces usually reserved for dog-fighting F-14 jocks under full afterburners, basically causing him to become insignificant for the remainder of the event. However, the automobile remained on the straight highway for about 2.5 miles [4.0 km] (15–20 seconds) before the driver applied and completely melted the brakes, blowing the tires and leaving thick rubber marks on the road surface, then becoming airborne for an additional 1.4 miles [2.3 km] and impacting the cliff face at a height of 125 feet [38 m], leaving a blackened crater 3 feet [0.9 m] deep in the rock.

Most of the driver's remains were not recoverable; however, small fragments of bone, teeth and hair were extracted from the crater, and fingernail and bone shards were removed from a piece of debris believed to be a portion of the steering wheel.

== History ==
The original Darwin Awards were fictitious. Both were contained in a 1990 version of the JATO Rocket Car urban legend posted to the rec.models.rockets Usenet newsgroup. When this urban legend was debunked, it was specifically pointed out that the mentioned Darwin Awards were fictitious. It contained a reference to the 1985 mention of a Vending Machine Tipover Darwin Award. It was Paul Vixie who wrote this introduction to the JATO urban legend that first included the term "Darwin Award". Vixie credits Charles Haynes with making the (informal) Darwin Award Nomination, but it was Vixie's specific wording, with the first sentence crediting Haynes stripped off, that was actually circulated and referred to the Darwin Awards as if they actually existed and were common knowledge, though the message was not widely circulated until it was reformatted.

It remained fairly dormant until 1995, when the message surfaced again in rec.pyrotechnics with the email header stripped off the introduction, though the main story is still indented. Three days later the introduction is fully integrated into the story and it appeared on rec.humor in a form that made it a truly infectious meme. Shortly after it was reposted in 1995, it quickly began to spread, being posted on Usenet 24 times within the next month. In 1996 the legend was further embellished with references to the year of manufacture of the car and G-Forces and to the form which was widely circulated via email (55% of all postings on usenet which included "JATO Rocket Darwin Award impala" also included "g-forces".

Cult of the Dead Cow, a hacker group and ezine, published an extensive elaboration in 1998 that claims to explain how the story came into being, describing the most common details of the Rocket Car legend. Four males under 25 engaged in scouting, welding, drinking, and Rube Goldberg engineering to build a rocket rail car after they happened upon JATOs in a junk pile. Supposed author CarInTheCliff also describes the car's only test plus the elements he has added while discouraging repeats by example. In this account it is also claimed that the story had first circulated long before 1990.

The Darwin Awards meme was also spread by Wendy Northcutt, who collected the Darwin Awards on a public website in 1993, and circulated new stories in a regular newsletter.

== The MythBusters investigation ==
To test the story – the very first myth they tackled – Jamie Hyneman and Adam Savage, with help from honorary MythBuster Erik Gates, procured a 1966 Chevrolet Impala, and after they were unable to obtain actual JATOs, they substituted three model rockets in succession to produce an equivalent amount of thrust (3,000 horsepower [2,200 kW] for 15 seconds). They also installed a rocket rack and reinforced the car so that the rockets would not tear off the roof, and even made use of a hydraulic system that the previous owner had installed on the car to lower the front of the car and make it more aerodynamic. However, when tested in the Mojave Desert, the car did not go anywhere near the 300 miles per hour (480 km/h) reported in the original story, and failed to become airborne.

The program has revisited the story twice, in 2007's "Supersized Myths" (the rockets exploded on the ramp) and their 10th Anniversary episode "JATO Rocket Car: Mission Accomplished?". The 12 motors were built by John Newman, Rick Maschek, and others with one motor first being static tested, successfully, at the FAR site (Friends of Amateur Rocketry) to avoid another explosion. On the two cars used, the motors were stacked vertically to keep the cars going straight in the event one or more of the motors did not ignite. The car was weighted towards the front in an attempt to improve its aerodynamic stability but no attempt was made to ensure the thrust vector of the rocket pack was being applied through the center of gravity (CG) of the car. The thrust vector proved to be far too high above the CG causing the car to immediately nosedive as it left the ramp and smash into the ground. The still firing motors propelled the car up into the air a second time, where it did a rotation until smashing into the ground.

== Dodge Coronet TV ad ==
To advertise the stopping power (rather than speed) of the 1958 Dodge Coronet's 'total contact' brakes, a JATO bottle was fitted to a Coronet and it was driven at speed across the El Mirage dry lake. This commercial was broadcast during the Dodge-sponsored Lawrence Welk Show.

== See also ==
- Rocket car
- Jack Parsons, rocket engineer who pioneered JATO and died in an explosion in 1952
