= Old wives' tale =

Supposed truth that is actually spurious or a superstition

"Old wives' tale" is a colloquial expression referring to spurious or superstitious claims. They can be said sometimes to be a type of urban legend, said to be passed down by older women to a younger generation. Such tales are considered superstition, folklore or unverified claims with exaggerated and/or inaccurate details. Old wives' tales often centre on women's traditional concerns, such as pregnancy, puberty, social relations, health, herbalism, and nutrition.

== Origins ==
In this context, the word wife means "woman" rather than "married woman". This usage stems from Old English wif ("woman") and is akin to the German Weib (also meaning "woman"). This sense of the word is still used in Modern English in constructions such as midwife and fishwife.

Old wives' tales are often invoked to discourage certain behaviours, usually of children, or to share knowledge of folk cures for ailments ranging from toothaches to dysentery.

The concept of old wives' tales has existed for centuries. In 1611, the King James Bible was published with the following translation of a verse: "But refuse profane and old wives' fables, and exercise thyself [rather] unto godliness" (1 Timothy 4:7).

Old wives' tales originate in the oral tradition of storytelling. They were generally propagated by illiterate women, telling stories to each other or to children. The stories do not attempt to moralise, but to teach lessons and make difficult concepts like death or coming of age easy for children to understand. These stories are also used to scare children so they do not do undesirable things.

== See also ==
- List of common misconceptions
- Aphorism
- Fakelore
- Lies-to-children
- Maxim (philosophy)
