= David Hahn =

American nuclear radiation enthusiast (1976–2016)

- Born: David Charles Hahn; October 30, 1976; Royal Oak, Michigan, U.S.
- Died: September 27, 2016 (aged 39); Shelby Charter Township, Michigan, U.S.
- Other names: Nuclear Boy Scout; Radioactive Boy Scout
- Education: Macomb Community College (attended)
- Military service
- Allegiance: United States
- Branch: United States Navy; United States Marine Corps
- Service years: 1997–2000s
- Rank: Petty officer third class (USN); Lance corporal (USMC)
- Known for: Building a neutron source in his mother's backyard

David Charles Hahn (October 30, 1976 – September 27, 2016), sometimes called the "Radioactive Boy Scout" and the "Nuclear Boy Scout", was an American nuclear radiation enthusiast who attempted to build a homemade nuclear reactor at the age of seventeen.

A scout in the Boy Scouts of America, Hahn conducted his experiments in secret in a backyard shed at his mother's house in Commerce Township, Michigan. Hahn's goal was to build and demonstrate a homemade breeder reactor. While he never managed to build a functioning reactor, he did build a crude neutron source. In August 1994, Hahn's progress attracted the attention of local police when they found concerning material in his vehicle during a stop for a separate matter. When Hahn warned them that the material was radioactive, the police contacted federal authorities, worried that he might have an atomic bomb. His mother's property was cleaned up by the Environmental Protection Agency (EPA) ten months later as a Superfund cleanup site. Hahn attained Eagle Scout rank shortly after his lab was dismantled.

While the incident was not widely publicized initially, it became better known following a 1998 Harper's Magazine article by journalist Ken Silverstein. Hahn was also the subject of Silverstein's 2004 book The Radioactive Boy Scout. As an adult, Hahn served in the U.S. Navy and U.S. Marine Corps. He was subsequently treated for mental illness, and his death at age 39 was related to drug and alcohol use.

== Early life ==
Hahn was born on October 30, 1976, in Royal Oak, Michigan. His father, Ken Hahn, was a mechanical engineer. His mother, Patty Hahn, suffered from alcoholism and was diagnosed with depression and schizophrenia and sent to a mental hospital when David was four. His parents divorced when he was nine, and his father gained custody. He had a stepmother, Kathy Missig, and a step-sister Kristina after his father remarried.

David's stepgrandfather John Sims gave him The Golden Book of Chemistry Experiments and encouraged his experiments in chemistry and science. David mowed other people's lawns to help fund his experiments. With one experiment, he created chloroform and as the book encouraged him to sniff the chemical, he did so and was unconscious for more than an hour, according to his recollection. David also loved to build fireworks and model rockets, which he altered with his own designs. As the experiments at home were becoming a problem and increasingly dangerous, David was encouraged by his father to join the Boy Scouts to provide discipline and distraction from his scientific endeavors.

== Creation of the neutron source ==
Hahn was fascinated by chemistry and spent years conducting amateur chemistry experiments, which sometimes caused small explosions and other mishaps. He was inspired in part by reading The Golden Book of Chemistry Experiments and tried to collect samples of every element in the periodic table, including the radioactive ones. He later received a merit badge in Atomic Energy and became fascinated with the idea of creating a breeder reactor in his home. Hahn diligently amassed radioactive material by collecting small amounts from household products, such as americium from smoke detectors, thorium from camping lantern mantles, radium from old clocks he had obtained from an antique store, and tritium from gunsights. His "reactor" was a bored-out block of lead, and he used lithium from $1,000 worth of purchased batteries to purify the thorium ash using a Bunsen burner.

Hahn ultimately hoped to create a breeder reactor, using low-level isotopes to transform samples of thorium and uranium into fissile isotopes.

His homemade neutron source was often incorrectly referred to as a nuclear reactor, but it did emit measurable levels of ionizing radiation, likely exceeding 1,000 times normal background radiation. Alarmed by this, David Hahn began to dismantle his experiments, but in a chance encounter, police discovered his activities, which triggered a Federal Radiological Emergency Response Team involving the FBI and the Nuclear Regulatory Commission. On June 26, 1995, the EPA, having designated Hahn's mother's property a Superfund hazardous materials cleanup site, dismantled the shed and placed its contents in steel barrels, which were later buried as low-level radioactive waste in Utah. Unbeknownst to officials, his mother, fearful that she would lose her house if the full extent of the radiation were known, had already collected the majority of the radioactive material David Hahn had hidden in the house and thrown it away in the conventional garbage. Hahn refused medical evaluation for radiation exposure. EPA scientists believed that Hahn's life expectancy may have been shortened due to his exposure to radioactivity, particularly since he spent long periods in the small, enclosed shed with relatively large amounts of radioactive material and only minimal safety precautions, but he refused their recommendation that he be examined at the Enrico Fermi Nuclear Generating Station. This was also probably from a fear they would use the results of such an examination to further his trouble.

== Career ==
Hahn became depressed after the scandal, a problem exacerbated by the breakup with his then-girlfriend and the suicide of his mother in early 1996. While he did graduate from high school, he lacked any direction or plans thereafter. His father and stepmother first encouraged him to attend Macomb Community College. He enrolled in a metallurgy program there, but frequently skipped classes. He was then encouraged to join the military, so he enlisted in the Navy in May 1997, assigned to the nuclear-powered aircraft carrier USS Enterprise as an undesignated seaman (pay grade E-3). After a five-and-a-half-year tour, he achieved interior communications specialist with a rank of petty officer, third class (pay grade E-4).

After his time on USS Enterprise, Hahn enlisted in the Marine Corps and was stationed in North Carolina. After a few years, Hahn achieved the rank of lance corporal (E-3). Shortly after returning from a rotation in Japan, he was honorably discharged on medical grounds and returned to Michigan.

== FBI investigation ==
On April 23, 2007, the FBI received a lead regarding Hahn's alleged possession of a second neutron source in his freezer. Contacted via telephone, Hahn insisted that he was not in possession of radioactive material. The FBI decided no imminent terrorist threat was present, but decided to attempt a personal interview. During an interview at an FBI office on May 16, 2007, investigators' questions touched on a variety of topics, such as flyers that Hahn had distributed promoting his book and upcoming film, theft of tires and rims from a vehicle prior to his Navy service, a diagnosis of paranoid schizophrenia, and a few less significant topics. FBI agents then interviewed an individual (whose identity was not released) who stated that Hahn was using cocaine heavily, was not taking his prescribed medication, was paranoid about people who he claimed "had the ability to 'shock' his genitals with their minds", and had possibly been visited by prostitutes. The individual also stated that he believed that Hahn was still trying to build a reactor and was collecting radium. He stated that he did not believe Hahn had any intentions of hurting anyone, but was concerned about his mental state.

== Larceny of smoke detectors ==
On August 1, 2007, Hahn was charged with larceny in Clinton Township, Michigan for allegedly removing a number of smoke detectors from the halls of his apartment building. His intention was to obtain americium from them. In his mug shot, his face was covered with sores, which investigators believed could have been from exposure to radioactive materials. During a Circuit Court hearing, Hahn pleaded guilty to attempted larceny of a building. The court's online docket said prosecutors recommended that he be sentenced to time served and enter an inpatient treatment facility. Under terms of the plea, the original charge of larceny of a building would be dismissed at sentencing, scheduled for October 4. He was sentenced to 90 days in jail for attempted larceny. Court records stated that his sentence would be delayed by six months while Hahn underwent medical treatment in the psychiatric unit of Macomb County Jail.

== Death ==
On September 27, 2016, at the age of 39, Hahn died in his hometown of Shelby Charter Township, Michigan. His death was ruled an accidental result of intoxication from the combined effects of alcohol, fentanyl, and diphenhydramine. The medical examiner's report indicated a blood alcohol concentration of 0.404 mg/dL.

== In popular culture ==
The 1995 incident received scant media attention at the time, but was widely disseminated after writer Ken Silverstein published an article about the incident in Harper's Magazine in 1998. In 2004 he expanded it into a book, The Radioactive Boy Scout, which was optioned for a feature film in 2016.

In the CSI: NY episode "Page Turner", the character Lawrence Wagner is based on Hahn.

A television documentary, The Nuclear Boy Scout, aired on Channel 4 in the United Kingdom in 2003. In it, Hahn reenacted some of his methods for the camera.

Hahn's experiments inspired others to attempt similar feats, particularly Taylor Wilson, who at age 14 became the youngest person to produce nuclear fusion.

StarQuest Production Network (SQPN)'s mystery program Jimmy Akin Mysterious World dedicated its 92nd episode, "The Radioactive Boy Scout", to Hahn.

Duncan Jones, the director of 2011 science fiction action thriller film Source Code, claims that the villain Derek Frost was inspired by the 2003 documentary The Nuclear Boy Scout.

Episode 20 of comedy history podcast The Dollop covers Hahn's exploits.

The song "Baby Criminal" by Swedish post-punk band Viagra Boys from their 2022 studio album Cave World is loosely based on Hahn's life, as is the song "Playing with Uranium" by Duran Duran from their 2000 studio album Pop Trash.

Hahn's story was the subject of a 2025 episode of the Omnibus podcast featuring Jeopardy! host Ken Jennings and musician John Roderick.

Released in November 2025, episode 340 of the podcast Criminal explores Hahn's personal backstory and his subsequent nuclear experiments through interviews with author Ken Silverstein.

Nuclear Boy (2026) is a Dutch film loosely based on Hahn’s life.

== See also ==
- Richard Handl
- Taylor Wilson
