= Amateur chemistry =

Pursuit of chemistry as a hobby

Amateur chemistry or home chemistry is the pursuit of chemistry as a private hobby. Amateur chemistry is usually done with whatever chemicals are available at disposal at the privacy of one's home. It should not be confused with clandestine chemistry, which involves the illicit production of controlled drugs.^{[a]} Notable amateur chemists include Oliver Sacks and Sir Edward Elgar.

== History ==
=== Origins ===
Amateur chemistry shares its early history with that of chemistry in general. Pioneers of modern chemistry such as Robert Boyle and Antoine Lavoisier were gentlemen scientists who pursued their research independently from their source of income. Only with the coming of the Industrial Revolution, and the rise of universities as research institutions, did any significant distinction between amateurs and professionals emerge. Nevertheless, amateur progress lasted well into the 19th century. For example, in 1886, Charles Martin Hall co-invented the Hall-Héroult process for extracting aluminium from its oxide whilst working in a woodshed behind his family home. The history of amateur chemistry ties in well with that of chemistry in general. The history of chemistry represents a time span from ancient history to the present. By 1000 BC, civilizations used technologies that would eventually form the basis to the various branches of chemistry. These processes include extracting metals from ores, making pottery and glazes, fermenting beer and wine, extracting chemicals from plants for medicine and perfume, rendering fat into soap, making glass, and making alloys like bronze.

=== Chemistry as a hobby ===
Throughout much of the 20th century, amateur chemistry was an unexceptional hobby, with high-quality chemistry sets readily available, and laboratory suppliers freely selling to hobbyists. For example, Linus Pauling had no difficulty in procuring potassium cyanide at the age of eleven. Many academics, from researchers to university professors, and even Nobel prize laureates, have acknowledged that at least part of their interest in sciences could be traced back to chemistry sets and home labs when they were young. These include Dorothy Hodgkin, Robert F. Curl, George A. Olah, Rudolph A. Marcus, Louis J. Ignarro, Richard Schrock, Roger Y. Tsien, William D. Phillips, Steven Weinberg, Peter Licence, etc. However, due to increasing concerns about terrorism, drugs, and safety, suppliers became increasingly reluctant to sell to amateurs, and chemistry sets were steadily toned down. This trend has gradually continued, leaving hobbyists in many parts of the world without access to most reagents.

Even as recently as 2023, amateur chemists on forums and YouTube channels have been credited by academic researchers for suggesting and discussing novel viable synthetic routes before full investigations by the latter.

=== Usefulness as a learning and work training tool ===
Home-based chemistry labs were explored as a way to remotely teach students during the COVID-19 pandemic, especially since many local and state-level governments across the world imposed lockdowns or other types of restrictions to contain the spread of the virus.

== Notable amateur chemists ==
- Internet pioneer Vint Cerf, Intel co-founder Gordon Moore, and Hewlett Packard co-founder David Packard all used to practice amateur chemistry.
- British neurologist Oliver Sacks was a keen amateur chemist in his youth, as described in his memoir Uncle Tungsten: Memories of a Chemical Boyhood.
- Nobel Prize winning chemist Linus Pauling practised amateur chemistry in his youth.
- Wolfram Research co-founder Theodore Gray is a keen amateur chemist and element collector. His exploits (most notably the construction of a wooden table in the shape of the periodic table, having compartments holding real samples of each element) earned him the 2002 Ig Nobel prize for chemistry, which he accepted as a great honor. He writes a column for Popular Science magazine, featuring his home experiments.
- Amateur rocketeer (and later NASA engineer) Homer Hickham, together with his fellow Rocket Boys, experimented with a range of home-made rocket propellants. These included "Rocket Candy" made from potassium nitrate and sugar, and "Zincoshine" made from zinc and sulfur held together with moonshine alcohol.
- Composer Sir Edward Elgar practised amateur chemistry from a laboratory erected in his back garden. The original manuscript of the prelude to The Kingdom is stained with chemicals.
- Robert Boyle is largely regarded today as the first modern chemist, and therefore one of the founders of modern chemistry, and one of the pioneers of modern experimental scientific method.
- Maurice Ward, a hairdresser and amateur chemist who invented the thermal insulating material called Starlite.
- Robert Cornelius, inventor, businessman and lamp manufacturer credited for creating the first photographic self-portrait in 1839.

== Restrictions ==
Whilst the hobby is probably legal in most jurisdictions,^{[b]} the relationship between amateur chemists and law enforcement agencies is often fraught. Hobbyists are often affected by laws intended to fight drugs and terrorism. Furthermore, many chemical supply houses refuse to sell to amateurs, with such policies sometimes being stated openly. Even though the regulations discussed in this section may affect professional and academic laboratories (e.g. business and universities), private individuals, or both, amateur chemists are still affected by those addressed to the former ones, since they usually contain clues that explain the behaviour of these chemical suppliers. Medium-sized suppliers and multinationals have whole departments, sometimes named Compliance or Regulatory affairs, tasked with periodically checking and implementing new regulations regarding chemicals on their companies.

=== Canada ===
In Canada, a wide range of basic laboratory reagents such as nitric acid and hydrogen peroxide are restricted as "explosives precursors". Two of the main legal texts in Canada restricting the sale of certain chemicals are the Explosives Act, and the Explosives Regulations, 2013 (SOR/2013-211). Part 20 of the latter restricts the sale, acquisition, and storage of ten explosives precursors, namely, ammonium nitrate in solid form and with a nitrogen concentration >=28%, hydrogen peroxide >=30% conc., nitromethane, potassium chlorate, potassium perchlorate, solid sodium chlorate, nitric acid >= 75% conc., potassium nitrate, mixtures of potassium nitrate and sodium nitrate, and solid sodium nitrate. In 2021, the Canada Gazette published an amendment proposal to the Explosives Regulations, 2013 , which suggested measures including the classification of precursors into three tiers, and the addition of calcium ammonium nitrate, hexamethylenetetramine, aluminium powder, and acetone to the precursors list.

In late 2008, Lewis Casey, an 18-year-old college student from Saskatchewan, was arrested for owning a small chemistry lab in his family's garage. After the raid, the police initially claimed that it was a meth lab, but withdrew the drug charge a few days later. The Crown withdrew criminal charges against him on Oct. 13.

=== European Union ===
In the EU, regulations regarding reagent restrictions can be classified in several different sets: dual-use goods, substances in the Schedules 1, 2 and 3 of the CWC, substances on the Common Military List, hazardous chemicals (as defined by Prior Informed Consent Regulation), chemicals subject to the anti-torture regulation, chemicals that cannot be exported to given countries due to sanctions and embargoes, explosives precursors and drug precursors. Those regulations may contain provisions affecting one or more types of "agents" (e.g. manufacturers, resellers, distributors, etc.), end users, or both. Reagent manufacturers typically require customers to sign an end user declaration before accepting and processing the sale of a chemical listed on these schedules.

One of the cornerstones of EU legislation on hazardous chemicals is the Registration, Evaluation, Authorisation and Restriction of Chemicals (REACH), which is defined in Regulation (EC) No. 1907/2006

On the topic of explosives precursors, Regulation (EU) No. 98/2013 introduced rules to harmonize the sale, possession and use of several substances across all EU countries. It requires that each member state must define a National Contact Point to which economic operators must report suspicious transactions, thefts, and disappearances of significant quantities involving scheduled substances.

On 1 February 2021, Regulation (EU) 2019/1148 amended REACH and repealed Regulation (EC) No. 98/2013. The newer one is designed to ban the sale and possession of explosives precursors by members of the general public above given concentrations. Any individual can own these chemicals provided their concentration is below or equal to a given limit (e.g. for sulfuric acid up to 15% conc. in weight). Said upper limit allowed can be increased (e.g. for sulfuric acid, up to 40% conc.) by requesting a license to the national authority. Professional users are not affected by these thresholds. However, professional users and members of the general public must also report significant disappearances and thefts of restricted explosives precursors within 24 hours of detection to the national contact point.

List of scheduled explosives precursors on the EU
| Category | Substance | Upper limit w/o license | Upper limit w/ license |
|---|---|---|---|
| Restricted | Nitric acid | 3% w/w | 10% w/w |
| Restricted | Hydrogen peroxide | 12% w/w | 35% w/w |
| Restricted | Sulfuric acid | 15% w/w | 40% w/w |
| Restricted | Nitromethane | 16% w/w | 100% w/w |
| Restricted | Ammonium nitrate | 16% w/w of nitrogen in relation to ammonium nitrate (4) | No licensing permitted |
| Restricted | Potassium chlorate | 40% w/w | No licensing permitted |
| Restricted | Potassium perchlorate | 40% w/w | No licensing permitted |
| Restricted | Sodium chlorate | 40% w/w | No licensing permitted |
| Restricted | Sodium perchlorate | 40% w/w | No licensing permitted |
| Reportable | Hexamine | Does not apply | Does not apply |
| Reportable | Acetone | Does not apply | Does not apply |
| Reportable | Potassium nitrate | Does not apply | Does not apply |
| Reportable | Sodium nitrate | Does not apply | Does not apply |
| Reportable | Calcium nitrate | Does not apply | Does not apply |
| Reportable | Calcium ammonium nitrate | Does not apply | Does not apply |
| Reportable | Magnesium, powders | Does not apply | Does not apply |
| Reportable | Magnesium nitrate hexahydrate | Does not apply | Does not apply |
| Reportable | Aluminium, powders | Does not apply | Does not apply |

Drug precursors: Regulation (EC) No 273/2004 Regulation (EC) No 111/2005 Commission Delegated Regulation (EU) 2015/1011 of 24 April 2015

Regulation (EC) No 273/2004 was amended by Regulation (EU) No 1258/2013, which introduced the term "user", and split reagents on category 2 into categories 2A and 2B

List of scheduled drug precursors on the EU
| Category | Substance | Threshold |
|---|---|---|
| Category 1 | 1-phenyl-2-propanone (P2P); Methyl alpha-phenylacetoacetate (MAPA); Methyl 2-methyl-3-phenyloxirane-2-carboxylate (BMK methyl glycidate); 2-methyl-3-phenyloxirane-2-carboxylic acid (BMK glycidic acid); N-acetylanthranilic acid; Alpha-phenylacetoacetamide (APAA); Alpha-phenylacetoacetonitrile (APAAN); Isosafrol (cis + trans); 3,4-methylenedioxyphenylpropan-2-one; Piperonal; Safrole; Methyl 3-(1,3-benzodioxol-5-yl)-2-methyloxirane-2-carboxylate (PMK methyl glycidate); 3-(1,3-benzodioxol-5-yl)-2-methyloxirane-2-carboxylic acid (PMK glycidic acid); 4-anilino-N-phenethylpiperidine (ANPP); N-phenethyl-4-piperidone (NPP); Ephedrine; Pseudoephedrine; Norephedrine; Ergometrine; Ergotamine; Lysergic acid; (1R,2S)-(-)-chloroephedrine; (1S,2R)-(+)-chloroephedrine; (1S,2S)-(+)-chloropseudoephedrine; (1R,2R)-(-)-chloropseudoephedrine | |
| Subcategory 2A | Red phosphorus | 0,1 kg |
| Subcategory 2A | Acetic anhydride | 100 l |
| Subcategory 2B | Phenylacetic acid | 1 kg |
| Subcategory 2B | Anthranilic acid | 1 kg |
| Subcategory 2B | Piperidine | 0,5 kg |
| Subcategory 2B | Potassium permanganate | 100 kg |
| Category 3 | Hydrochloric acid; Sulfuric acid; Toluene; Ethyl ether; Acetone; Methylethylketone | |

Regarding waste management, it might be considered acceptable to dispose of some acidic or basic solutions by neutralizing and flushing them down the drain, provided that they don't contain other hazardous substances and the reaction products aren't hazardous either. However, other types of wastes must be disposed by handling them to an authorised waste management entity in an appropriate container, usually HDPE jerry cans. Such entities require each container received to be appropriately labeled with several details, which may include GHS hazard pictograms, the EWC (European Waste Catalogue) code, also called LoW (List of Waste) code, that identifies the type of waste. These codes were defined by the Commission Decision 2000/532/EC, later amended by Commission Decision 2014/955/EU. Laboratories typically classify their wastes into those containing halogenated solvents (such as chloroform and dichloromethane, EWC 14 06 02), non-halogenated solvents (like hexane and toluene, EWC 14 06 03 or 20 01 13), non-halogenated mineral oils (e.g. from rotary vane vacuum pumps, EWC 13 02 05, or 13 02 08), contaminated materials (including pipette tips, gloves, filter paper, EWC 15 02 02), contaminated glass (e.g. broken glassware, EWC 15 01 10), discarded reagents (EWC 16 05 06)

Several chemicals, especially solvents, are subject to taxes for certain uses. One such example is ethanol, due to its potential use in alcoholic drinks. Both Council Directive 92/81/EEC, and Council Directive 2003/96/EC, which repealed the former, impose taxes on several hydrocarbons that can be used as fuels. These hydrocarbons include hexane, heptane, isooctane (CN 2901 10 for most saturated acyclic hydrocarbons), petroleum ether (CN 2710 12 25), cyclohexane (CN 2902 11), benzene (CN 2902 20), toluene (CN 2902 30) and xylenes (o-Xylene: CN 2902 41, m-Xylene: CN 2902 42, p-Xylene: CN 2902 43, and a mix of these isomers: CN 2902 44), among others.

==== Germany ====
Regulations regarding hazardous chemicals in this country include the Explosives Act (Sprengstoffgesetz), and the Hazardous Substances Ordinance (Gefahrstoffverordnung, abbreviated as GefStoffV), which is part of the Chemicals Act (Chemikaliengesetz, abbreviated as ChemG). Another one is the Chemicals Prohibition Ordinance (Chemikalien-Verbotsverordnung, abbreviated as ChemVerbotsV). Additionally, Regulation (EU) 2019/1148 was transposed into German law in the Precursor Act (Ausgangsstoffgesetz, Precursor Act, abbreviated as AusgStG).

German amateur chemists have been raided by the police, despite not being in the possession of illegal chemicals.

==== Ireland ====
Regarding explosives precursors, Regulation (EU) 98/2013, was transposed in the Statutory Instrument No 611/2014.

==== Italy ====
In Italy, regulations regarding explosives precursors have been approved as the Ministry of the Interior's Circolare 557/PAS/U/004997/XV.H.MASS(53)5, titled Identificazione e tracciabilità degli esplosivi per uso civile: - Indicazioni operative e gestione delle scorte. Regulation (EU) 2019/1148 was implemented through the Legge 23 dicembre 2021, n. 238, whose article 13 modifies the Decreto Legislativo 14 settembre 2009, n. 133, adding a whole chapter to the latter (Chapter II, after article 17).

==== Portugal ====
On the topic of explosives precursors, Regulation (EU) 98/2013, was transposed into the Portuguese legal system as the Decree Law 56/2016, of 29th of August. This Decree Law was, in turn, repealed by Decree Law 62/2021, of 26th of July, which transposes Regulation (EU) 2019/1148.

==== Spain ====
Since the 1940s, chemistry sets for kids have been available on the Spanish market, some of these including "Quimicefa", manufactured by the Valencian company Celulosa Fabril SA (CEFA), and later on by CEFA Toys SA; "Cheminova", by Jugetes Mediterráneo SA, from Aldaia, Valencia, later acquired by MB-Hasbro; "La magia de la ciencia: Química" by the Madrilenian company Grupo Anaya SA; and "Quimex", by Quimex, Granollers, Catalonia. On January 3, 1994, Eduardo Rey Díaz, a 13-year-old boy from Getxo, Basque Country, was at a friend's house doing an experiment using materials from a chemistry set. After approaching the open end of a graduated cylinder containing a flammable substance to an open flame, a deflagration occurred, which left him with severe burns in his hands and face. The manufacturer was sued and later fined. Less than a year and a half later, in December 22, 1995, an 11-year-old boy and his 8-year-old sister from Galicia, suffered third and second-degree burns in 70 and 60% of their bodies. After watching them while they performed an experiment using another set from the same company, their mother ordered them to put the game away and left the room, but they kept playing. As a result of incorrectly handling the set, a deflagration occurred, and the company was sued and charged again. By the 2010s, many of them were no longer available. Despite these incidents, the positive impact of chemistry sets on kickstarting the curiosity of children, some of whom would later become professional scientists and engineers, has been acknowledged.

According to the Resolution of 20 November 2013 of the Spanish State Secretariat for Security, the National Contact Point for this country is the Intelligence Center for Counter-Terrorism and Organized Crime (CITCO). Before the transposition of Regulation (EU) 2019/1148 into Spanish Law 25/2022, of 1st of November, explosives precursors were addressed by Law 8/2017, of 8 November, on explosives precursors, which the former repealed and replaced. On the other hand, drug precursors are addressed by the Law 4/2009, of 15 June, on drug precursors control, and the Royal Decree 129/2017, of 24 February, by which the Drug Precursors Control Regulation is approved. Every year, operators of drug precursors are required to fill a questionnaire, titled "Annual questionnaire for the declaration of operations with scheduled chemicals" ("Cuestionario anual de declaración de operaciones con sustancias químicas catalogadas" in Spanish), stating in-depth details regarding purchases, sales, and operations involving substances listed in the Categories 1, 2 and 3 of the Regulation (EC) No 273/2004 during that year. The first ones (purchases and sales) must include information on the quantities, full contact details and address, and NIF or DNI number of the suppliers or buyers.

Additionally, the storage of chemicals, including reagents, flammable solvents, and gas cylinders, is regulated by Royal Decree 656/2017, of 23 June. Industrial establishments also need to take into account Royal Decree 2267/2004, of 3 December, by which the fire safety regulations for industrial establishments are approved.

In general, the topic of hazardous waste management is discussed on Law 22/2011, of 28 July, on wastes and contaminated soils, which was repealed and replaced by Law 7/2022, of 8 April. The transport of wastes is regulated as well, by the Royal Decree 553/2020, of 2 June. Business that meet the definition of 'waste producers' or 'waste management facilities' need to obtain an Environmental Identification Number (Número de identificación medioambiental, NIMA). Said numbers are issued by the government of the autonomous community where the business is located.

Several EU regulations regarding special taxes have been transposed to Spanish regulations in Law 38/1992, of 28 December, of Special Taxes. It was later extended by the Royal Decree 1165/1995, of 7 July, by which the Regulation on Special Taxes is approved. According to article 79 of the latter, even though ethanol is subject to a special tax due to its potential use in spirits, its use in scientific research can be exempted. This exemption requires obtaining an Activity and Establishment Code (Código de Actividad y del Establecimiento, CAE), which allows to request a refund from the Tax Agency (Agencia Tributaria) by submitting a filled form model 572. Said code is composed of 13 characters, the first two being "ES", then three zeros, two characters identifying the local management office, two more characters for the activity, a sequential inscription number made up of three characters, and finally a control letter. A refund can also be requested for the special tax on hydrocarbons as long as they aren't used as fuels, according to article 109 the same Royal Decree (1165/1995, of 7 July).

==== Sweden ====
One of the laws regulating chemicals in Sweden is the Act on flammable and explosive goods (Lag om brandfarliga och explosiva varor).

=== Norway ===
In September 2018, a 29-year-old physician and amateur chemist and his girlfriend were arrested at their home on in Nord-Jæren, two days after inquiring a local pharmacy about the availability of 35% hydrogen peroxide. He explained that he had an accident while camping, suffering a wound that he stitched himself. Being a physician and seeing the effect of flame-sterilizing on his surgical instruments, he was looking for a milder alternative that could also be used to disinfect wounds. However, his enquiry triggered the submission of an alert to KRIPOS, which sent a few police officers to the house. These officers would, in turn, find the chemicals from his lab, and arrest him.

One law in this country that regulates flammable chemicals, gas cylinders, and explosive substances is the Fire and Explosion Protection Act (Brann- og eksplosjonsvernloven).

=== United Kingdom ===
In the UK it is a criminal offence for members of the general public to purchase, and for business to sell, certain types of poisons or explosives precursors to those of the former group without a valid EPP license. Purchasing substances on this list is restricted since 26 May 2015, and its possession is also restricted since 3 March 2016. Since July 1st 2018, the acquisition of sulfuric acid in concentrations above 15% in weight by members of the general public also requires an EPP licence, which has impacted lead-acid battery sellers.

On 26 February 2022, three men, aged between 20 and 25, were arrested in Wigan on suspicions they had violated Section 4 of the Explosives Act. A search warrant had found several chemicals on their flat. Soon after, the eldest was released on bail, and the other two were also released under investigation. Two years later, in May 2024, the investigation concluded that they had just been doing amateur chemistry, and none of the three were charged.

Some regulations regarding restricted chemicals in this country include the Poison Act 1972, which was amended by the Deregulation Act 2015, and the Control of Poisons and Explosives Precursors Regulations 2015. On 1 October 2023, a new set of amendments to the Poisons Act 1972, known as the "Control of Poisons and Explosives Precursors Regulations 2023", came into force. According to these amendments, hexamine, hydrochloric acid in concentrations 10% w/w and higher, and ammonium nitrate with a nitrogen content of 16% or higher, and phosphoric acid in 30% w/w concentration or higher are now considered "regulated explosives precursors" instead of either "reportable explosives precursors" or "reportable poisons". The sulfides of aluminium, calcium, magnesium, sodium and zinc, as well as arsenic and its compounds are now considered "regulated poisons" rather than just "reportable poisons". Finally, sulfur, all metal phosphides, all metal sulfides, all metal polysulfides and sodium hypochlorite solutions above 6% available chlorine have been added to the "reportable poisons" list.

Directly related to the above is the Offensive Weapons Act 2019, which forbids the sale of corrosive chemicals to minors, as well as their shipment to residential addresses or lockers.

=== United States ===
In the United States, the Drug Enforcement Administration maintains lists regarding the classification of illicit drugs, which contain chemicals that are used to manufacture the controlled substances/illicit drugs. The lists are designated within The Controlled Substances Act, 21 U.S.C. § 802, paragraphs 34 (list I) and 35 (list II). Additionally, some regions have stringent regulations concerning the ownership of chemicals and equipment. For example, Texas once required the registration of even the most basic laboratory glassware. However, this requirement was repealed on June 6, 2019.

Several states define hazardous waste management laws, one example being the California Hazardous Waste Control Law (Cal. Health and Safety Code § 25100 -§ 25259 ). Passed in 2017, California Assembly Bill (AB) 245 raised the maximum administrative and civil penalties for violations of said law from $25,000 per day of noncompliance to $70,000 per day.

United Nuclear, an amateur science supplier based in New Mexico was raided in June 2003 at the behest of the U.S. Consumer Product Safety Commission, and subsequently fined $7,500 for "Selling Illegal Fireworks Components".

In 2008, the home laboratory of Victor Deeb, a retired chemist, was raided and dismantled

Almost a year later, Jack Robison, then a 19-year-old chemistry student at the Holyoke Community College, received a visit from members of the Massachusetts State Police, the Bureau of Alcohol, Tobacco, Firearms and Explosives, and the FBI. They asked him questions regarding several videos on small-scale experiments he had posted two years earlier on YouTube involving energetic materials, including PETN, potassium nitrate, and RDX, and wanted to check his mother's house basement. He was initially charged with three counts of malicious explosion and one count of possessing explosives with the intent to harm people or property, facing up to 60 years in prison, but was found not guilty after trial.

== In popular culture ==
Amateur chemistry has been depicted multiple times in mass media, through different formats. The protagonists or other characters of animated television series like Dexter's Laboratory, Tracey McBean and The Simpsons (e.g. on the Haw-Haw Land episode) are sometimes displayed performing chemistry experiments in their own laboratories.

On the other hand, there are several YouTube channels focused in chemical experiments. Most of them are run by amateurs, mostly by professional communicators and organizations, though there are a small sample of professional chemists.

== See also ==
- Element collecting
- Do-it-yourself biology

== Notes ==
- a. The terms "amateur chemistry" and "clandestine chemistry" are not rigidly defined, and may depend upon context. For clarity, this article defines "amateur chemistry" to be the practice of chemistry as a hobby, and not as the means to an illegal end. While clandestine chemistry is often amateur chemistry, not all amateur chemistry is clandestine chemistry.
- b. The legal status of amateur chemistry per se is somewhat ambiguous. Whilst there appears to be no legislation explicitly banning the activity, there is also little evidence to confirm its legality.
