= Richard Handl =

Swedish man (born 1980)

- Born: May 23, 1980 (age 46)
- Known for: Nuclear experimentation at home

Richard Handl (born May 23, 1980) is a Swedish man who experimented with tritium, americium, aluminium, beryllium, thorium, radium, and uranium, with the intention to create a nuclear reaction. He acquired most of the radioactive materials from foreign companies, while assembling a collection of periodic elements. For six months in 2011, he allegedly attempted to build a breeder reactor in his apartment in Ängelholm, Sweden.

== Background ==
Handl became unemployed after working in a factory for four years, and decided to start a collection of the elements in the periodic table. Out of curiosity Handl began experimenting with the elements in his collection, to see if he could create a nuclear reaction. Handl's experiments included the acquisition of fissile material from outside the country, a radiator suitable for transmutation, and instruments to measure the reaction, including a Geiger counter. He spent about 5,000–6,000 kronor in materials and equipment. One stage of the process involved cooking americium, radium, and beryllium in 96% sulfuric acid on a stove, in order to more easily mix the ingredients; doing so resulted in an explosion.

Handl kept a blog called "Richard's Reactor" in which he documented the progress of the reactor.

== Legal repercussions ==
Handl was detained by the police on 20 July 2011 after having contacted the Swedish Radiation Safety Authority (SSM) to inquire as to whether his project was legal or not. His apartment was searched, and the radioactive materials as well as his computer were taken by the police.

He was released, then convicted in July 2014 on the violation of the Radiation Safety Act, and the violation of Swedish Environmental Code. He was fined 13,600 kronor.

== See also ==
- David Hahn
- Taylor Wilson
