= Black snake (firework) =

Type of firework which smokes and spews out a long twisting ash resembling a snake

"Black snake" is a type of consumer firework consisting of a chemical that when set on fire burns with an intumescent reaction, exuding a long twisting string of ash resembling a snake. They are sold as pellets which are placed on a noncombustible surface and ignited with a match, burning slowly with little or no flame. Two earlier traditional formulas are now banned in retail fireworks because of the toxic chemicals they contain: the Pharaoh's Serpent which contains mercury (II) thiocyanate and the sugar snake which contains potassium dichromate. Sometimes these are performed as do-it-yourself amateur chemistry demonstrations.

== Pharaoh's snake ==
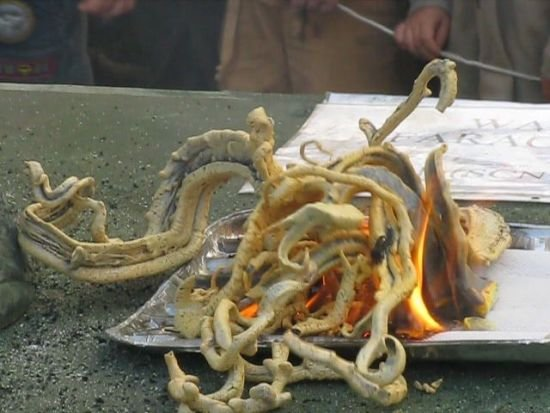
Pharaoh's serpent demonstration

The Pharaoh's snake is a more dramatic experiment and it requires more safety precautions than the sugar snake due to the presence of toxic mercury vapor and other mercury compounds.

This reaction was discovered by Friedrich Wöhler in 1821, soon after the first synthesis of mercury thiocyanate. It was described as "winding out from itself at the same time worm-like processes, to many times its former bulk, of a very light material of the color of graphite." For some time, a firework product called "Pharaoschlangen" was available to the public in Germany but was eventually banned when the toxic properties of the product were discovered through the deaths of several children who had mistakenly consumed the resulting solid.

The Pharaoh's snake experiment is conducted in the same manner as the sugar snake experiment; however, the former uses mercury(II) thiocyanate (Hg(SCN)_{2}) instead of powdered sugar with baking soda. This must be done in a fume hood because all mercury compounds are hazardous.

After igniting the reagents, mercury(II) thiocyanate breaks down to form mercury(II) sulfide (HgS), carbon disulfide (CS_{2}), and carbon nitride (C_{3}N_{4}). Graphitic carbon nitride, a pale yellow solid, is the main component of the ash.

2 Hg(SCN)_{2}(s) → 2 HgS(s) + CS_{2}(l) + C_{3}N_{4}(s)

Carbon disulfide ignites into carbon dioxide (CO_{2}) and sulfur(IV) oxide (SO_{2}).

CS_{2}(l) + 3 O_{2}(g) → CO_{2}(g) + 2 SO_{2}(g)

While carbon nitride (C_{3}N_{4}) will break down into nitrogen gas and cyanogen.

2 C_{3}N_{4}(s) → 3 (CN)_{2}(g) + N_{2}(g)

When mercury(II) sulfide (HgS) reacts with oxygen (O_{2}), it will form gray mercury vapor and sulfur dioxide. If the reaction is performed inside a container, a gray film of mercury coating on its inner surface can be observed.

HgS(s) + O_{2}(g) → Hg(l) + SO_{2}(g)

== Sugar snake ==
Black snake experiment

Unlike the carbon snake, which involves the reaction of sulfuric acid instead of sodium bicarbonate, the sugar snake grows relatively faster and to a significantly larger volume.

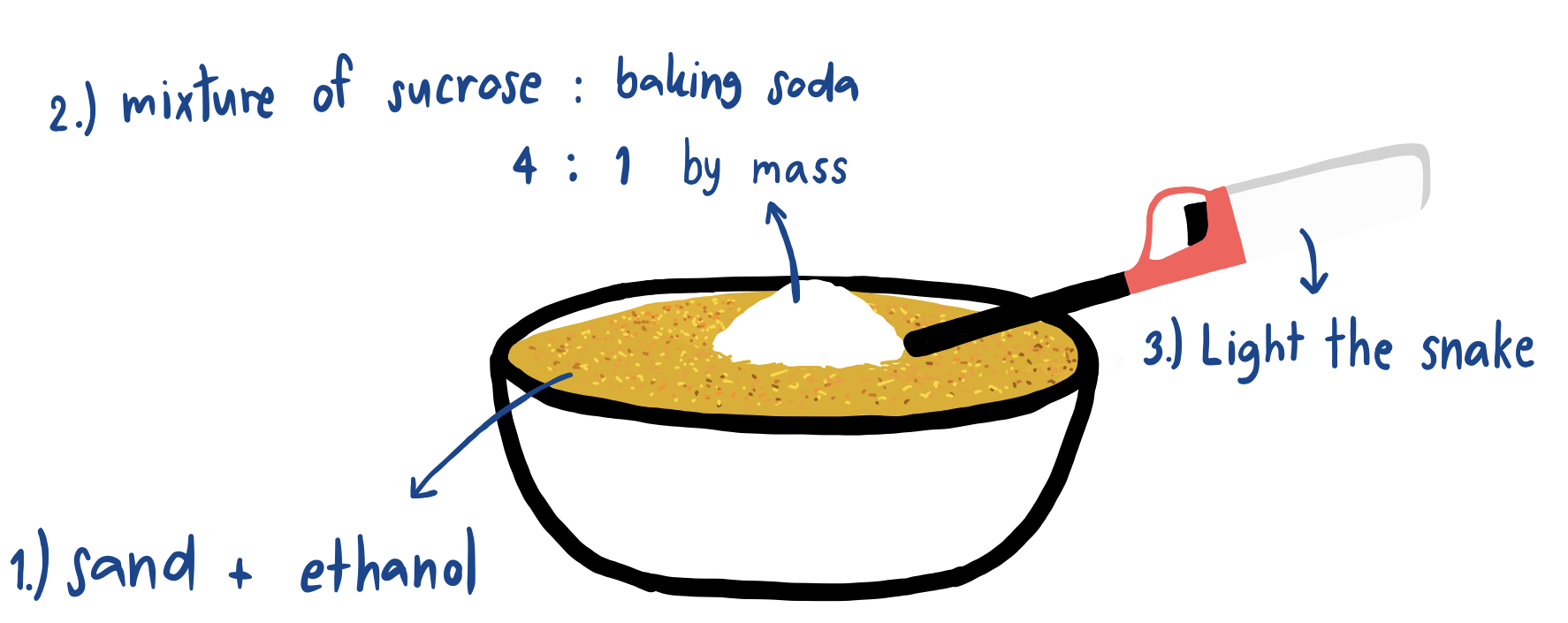
Sucrose: Sodium bicarbonate (4:1) placed on top of sand and ethanol

Solid fuel is used in this experiment. The solid fuel can be sand that is sufficiently covered in ethanol or hexamethylenetetramine. A white mixture of sucrose and sodium bicarbonate will eventually turn black and the snake will grow about 15–50 centimetres (5.9–19.7 in) long after it is lit.

Three chemical reactions occur when the snake is lit. Sodium bicarbonate breaks down into sodium carbonate, water vapor, and carbon dioxide:

2 NaHCO_{3}(s) → Na_{2}CO_{3}(s) + H_{2}O(g) + CO_{2}(g)

Burning sucrose or ethanol (reaction with oxygen in the air) produces carbon dioxide gas and water vapor:

C_{12}H_{22}O_{11}(s) + 12 O_{2}(g) → 12 CO_{2}(g) + 11 H_{2}O(g)
C_{2}H_{5}OH(l) + 3 O_{2}(g) → 2 CO_{2}(g) + 3 H_{2}O(g)

Some of the sucrose does not burn, but merely decomposes at the high temperature, giving off elemental carbon and water vapor:

C_{12}H_{22}O_{11}(s) → 12 C(s) + 11 H_{2}O(g)

The carbon in the reaction makes the snake black. The overall process is exothermic enough that the water produced in the reactions is vaporized. This steam, in addition to the carbon dioxide product, makes the snake lightweight and airy and allows it to grow to a large size from a comparably small amount of starting material.

== Retail black snake ==
Modern retail black snake fireworks are based on proprietary formulas which are less toxic than the earlier types. In the 1800s it was found the residue left when petroleum and tar are treated with sulfuric acid, when reacted with fuming nitric acid, forms a black resin which, when burned, leaves a highly porous black ash that expands even more than thiocyanate. In 1931 a pyrotechnic snake based on a nitrated beta naphthol pitch was patented by inventor William F. Gehrig. A version using nitrated pitch combined with ammonium perchlorate was developed by Shimizu in 1981, and one using pitch combined with tetryl by Hardt in 2001. They are often marketed in the form of small black pellets and are nondeliquescent and shelf-stable.

== Use ==
Black snakes are a popular firework in India, which children play with during the festival of Diwali. Though deemed toxic by the Chest Research foundation and Pune University, black snake fireworks are still in use. The objective of the study was to determine which firework produced the most air pollution in India. The conducted study showed that the snake fireworks emitted the highest particulate matter, capable of penetrating the lungs via inhalation of smoke particles and consequently, causing significant damage. Other fireworks that emit large amounts of smoke particles include fuljhadi (Sparkler), pulpul (Firecracker), chakris (Spinning Rocket) and annar (Flowerpot Firework).

== In popular culture ==
An oversized black snake was featured as a plot device in the South Park episode "Summer Sucks".

== See also ==
- Chemical volcano
- Soda geyser
- Elephant's toothpaste
- Intumescent
- Starlite
