= Headache Hat =

Headband

- Founder: Sherri Pulie
- Headquarters: Connecticut, United States

Headache Hat is a wearable ice pack for migraines and headaches. It is an alternative to traditional ice packs and is worn as a headband. In 2019, the product was featured in Business Insider as 'Best Migraine Relief Ice Pack'. The product was also featured in several other magazines including Good Housekeeping and PopSugar.

== History ==
The company was founded by Sherri Pulie in 2013 and is headquartered in Connecticut, United States.

Sherri made first prototype using pilates spandex and plastic-coated ice cubes.

Headache Hat is owned by TheraICE.
