= Carbon snake =

Experiment demonstrating the dehydration of sugar by sulfuric acid

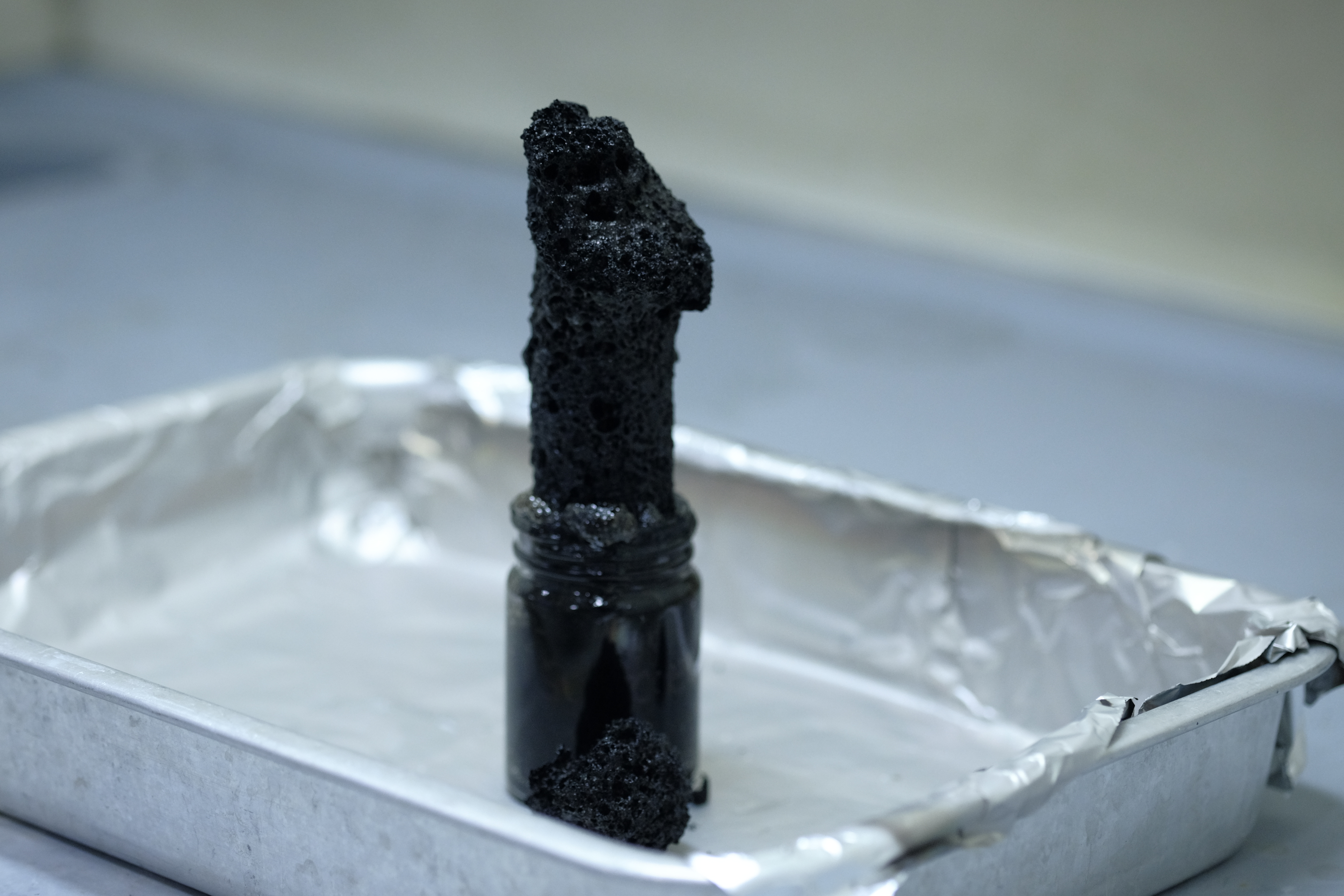
A column of porous black carbon formed during the experiment.

Carbon snake experiment

The carbon snake is a demonstration of the dehydration reaction of sugar by concentrated sulfuric acid. With concentrated sulfuric acid, granulated table sugar (sucrose) performs a degradation reaction which changes its form to a black solid-liquid mixture. The carbon snake experiment can sometimes be misidentified as the black snake, "sugar snake", or "burning sugar" reaction, all of which involve baking soda rather than sulfuric acid.

== Explanation ==
Concentrated sulfuric acid can perform a dehydration reaction with table sugar. After mixing, the color changes from white to brownish and eventually to black. The expansion of the mixture is the result of vaporization of water and CO_{2} inside the container. The gases inflate the mixture to form a snake-like shape, and give off a burned sugar smell. The granularity of the sugar can greatly affect the reaction: powdered sugar reacts very quickly but sugar cubes take longer to react.

When sucrose is dehydrated, heat is given out to the surroundings in an exothermic reaction, while amorphous carbon and liquid water are produced by the decomposition of the sugar:

C_{12}H_{22}O_{11}(s) + H_{2}SO_{4}(aq) + ½ O_{2}(g) → 11 C(s) + CO_{2}(g) + 12 H_{2}O(g) + SO_{2}(g)

As the acid dehydrates the sucrose, the water produced will dilute the sulfuric acid, giving out energy in the form of heat.

C_{12}H_{22}O_{11}(s) → 12 C(s) + 11 H_{2}O(l)

== Alternative experiment ==
Paranitroaniline can be used instead of sugar, if the experiment is allowed to proceed under an obligatory fumehood. With this method the reaction phase prior to the black snake's appearance is longer, but once complete, the black snake itself rises from the container very rapidly. This reaction may cause an explosion if too much sulfuric acid is used.

== See also ==
- Elephant's toothpaste
- Black snake (firework)
- Chemical volcano
- Diet Coke and Mentos eruption
