= Touchpress =

App developer and publisher (2010–2016)

- Founded: 2010
- Founder: Theodore Gray, Max Whitby, John Cromie, Stephen Wolfram
- Country of origin: United Kingdom
- Headquarters location: London
- Publication types: Books, iPhone and iPad apps

Touchpress was an app developer and publisher based in Central London. The company specialised in creating apps on educational subjects including the Periodic Table, Beethoven, the Solar System, T.S. Eliot, Shakespeare, and others.

In October 2016, Touchpress sold its portfolio of apps to a publisher, Touch Press Inc. The company has rebranded to "Amphio".

== Origins ==
Touchpress was founded by Theodore Gray, Max Whitby, John Cromie, Stephen Wolfram and others shortly after the announcement of the launch of the iPad. The first published app was "The Elements," a continuation of the founders' work together on a coffee table book about the periodic table, which they followed up in 2014 with "Molecules", allowing users to touch and discover the basic building blocks of the world.

== Design philosophy ==
Touchpress creates "living books." Their apps feature many interactive elements and seek to engage readers with a deeper understanding of the subject. The company is part of a broad movement to re-define books and the reading experience for the 21st century. Touchpress is particularly notable for their partnerships both within and outside the publishing industry. To date, the company has worked with Juilliard, Disney, Deutsche Grammophon, Faber and Faber, Seamus Heaney, Björk, Fiona Shaw, Patrick Stewart, Steve Reich, Stephen Fry, Andrew Motion, Stephen Hough, Esa-Pekka Salonen and the Philharmonia Orchestra, National Geographic, and more.

== Apps published by Touchpress ==
- 2010 "The Elements"
- 2011 "X is for X-Ray"
- 2011 "Skulls by Simon Winchester"
- 2011 "Gems and Jewels"
- 2011 "The Waste Land"
- 2012 "March of the Dinosaurs"
- 2012 "Solar System"
- 2012 "Leonardo da Vinci: Anatomy"
- 2012 "The Sonnets by William Shakespeare"
- 2012 "The Pyramids"
- 2012 "War Horse"
- 2012 "The Orchestra"
- 2012 "Barefoot World Atlas"
- 2013 "Beethoven's 9th Symphony"
- 2013 "The Liszt Sonata"
- 2013 "Disney Animated"
- 2013 "The Elements in Action"
- 2013 "Journeys Of Invention"
- 2014 "Incredible Numbers by Professor Ian Stewart"
- 2014 "Vivaldi's Four Seasons"
- 2014 "Seamus Heaney: Five Fables"
- 2014 "The Elements Flashcards"
- 2014 "Collins Bird Guide"
- 2014 "Apprentice Architect"
- 2014 "Think Like Churchill"
- 2014 "False Conviction"
- 2014 "Molecules"
- 2015 "Juilliard Open Studios"
- 2015 "Juilliard String Quartet"
- 2015 "Steve Reich's Clapping Music"
- 2015 "Arcadia by Iain Pears"
- 2015 "Baron Ferdinand's Challenge"
- 2015 "Classical Music Reimagined"
- 2016 "Millie Marotta’s Colouring Adventures"
- 2016 "The Henle Library"
