= Glycerol and potassium permanganate =

Example of spontaneous oxidation

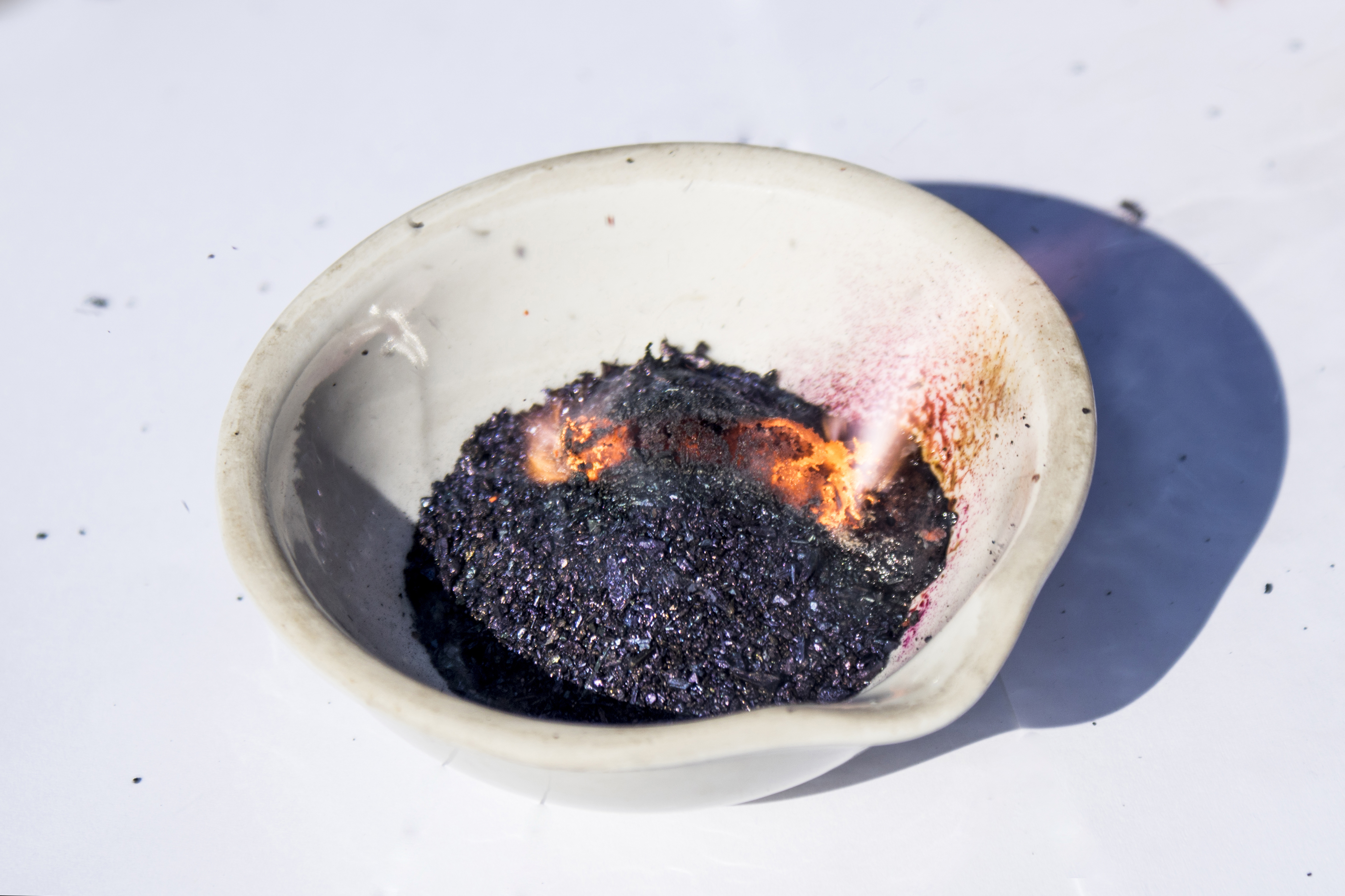
An almost complete reaction of glycerol and potassium permanganate

The chemical redox reaction between potassium permanganate and glycerol is often used to demonstrate the powerful oxidizing property of potassium permanganate, especially in the presence of organic compounds such as glycerol. The exothermic (heat producing) reaction between potassium permanganate (KMnO_{4}), a strong oxidizing agent, and glycerol (C_{3}H_{5}(OH)_{3}), a readily oxidised organic substance, is an example of an experiment sometimes referred to as a "chemical volcano".

== Explanation ==
Potassium permanganate (KMnO_{4}) is a dark violet colored powder. Its reaction with glycerol (commonly known as glycerin or glycerine) (C_{3}H_{5}(OH)_{3}) is highly exothermic, resulting rapidly in a flame, along with the formation of carbon dioxide and water vapour:

14 KMnO_{4}(s) + 4 C_{3}H_{5}(OH)_{3}(l) → 7 K_{2}CO_{3}(s) + 7 Mn_{2}O_{3}(s) + 5 CO_{2}(g) + 16 H_{2}O(g)

Crystalline potassium permanganate (KMnO_{4}) is placed in an evaporating dish. A depression is made at the center of the permanganate powder and glycerol liquid is added to it. The white smoke-like vapor produced by the reaction is a mixture of carbon dioxide gas and water vapor. Since the reaction is highly exothermic, initial sparking occurs, followed by a lilac- or pink-colored flame. When energy or heat is added to electrons, their energy level increases to an excited state. This state is short-lived, and once the electrons release the energy, they return to their normal energy levels. During this process the energy is visibly observed as light. When the reaction is complete, it leaves behind a grayish solid with green regions.

== See also ==
- Carbon snake
- Sugar snake
