= The Golden Book of Chemistry Experiments =

Book by Robert Brent

- Author: Robert Brent
- Illustrator: Harry Lazarus
- Language: English
- Series: Golden Books
- Subject: Chemistry
- Genre: Textbook
- Publisher: Western Publishing
- Publication date: 1960
- Publication place: United States
- Pages: 112
- ISBN: 9798397215541

The Golden Book of Chemistry Experiments is a children's chemistry book written in 1960 by Robert Brent and illustrated by Harry Lazarus and published by Western Publishing as part of their Golden Books series.

A decade after the book's publication, concerns were raised over the safety of the reactions described, which frequently used or generated toxic or corrosive substances. For example, one experiment generated toxic chlorine gas, and another used carbon tetrachloride, a potent hepatotoxin.

The book was also believed to be a source of inspiration to David Hahn, nicknamed "the Radioactive Boy Scout" by the media, who attempted to construct a nuclear reactor in his mother's shed, although the book does not include any nuclear reactions.

Due to safety concerns, the book was eventually pulled from library shelves. It became quite rare, and as of November 2023 OCLC lists only 101 copies of this book in libraries worldwide. However, privately owned copies are routinely put up for sale online, as are PDF scans.

== Printing history ==
The first edition was printed in 1960. A second printing was made in 1962 and a revised edition was printed in 1963.
