= Elephant's toothpaste =

Hot foamy substance

Elephant toothpaste reaction

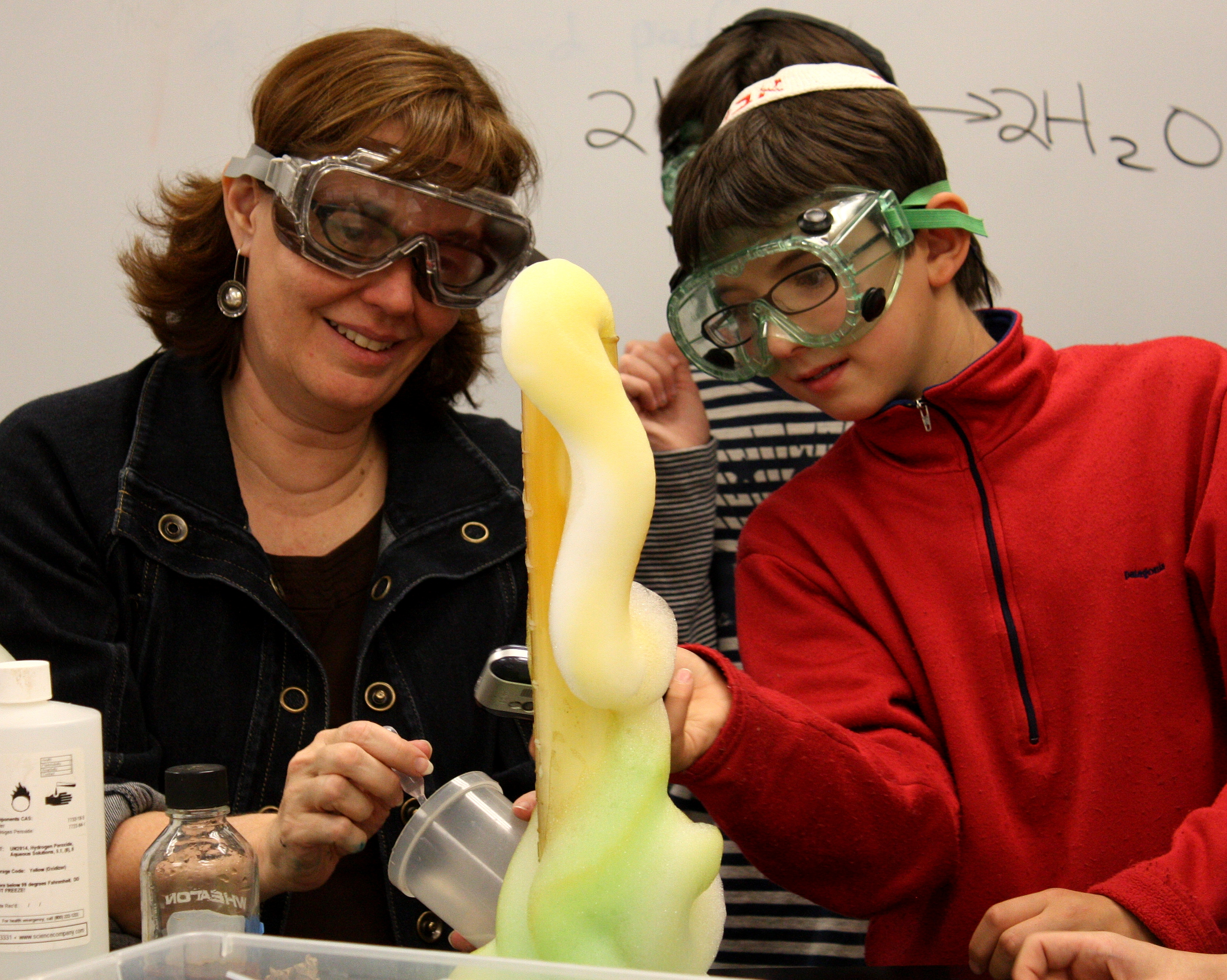
Two people watching the reaction of Elephant's toothpaste

Elephant's toothpaste is a hot foamy substance caused by the quick decomposition of hydrogen peroxide (H_{2}O_{2}) using potassium iodide (KI) or yeast and warm water as a catalyst. How rapidly the reaction proceeds primarily depends on the concentration of hydrogen peroxide.

== Explanation ==
The variation of elephant's toothpaste experiment with colorants

=== Description ===
About 50 ml of concentrated (>12%) hydrogen peroxide is first mixed with liquid soap or dishwashing detergent. Then, a catalyst, often around 10 ml potassium iodide solution or catalase from baker's yeast, is added to make the hydrogen peroxide decompose very quickly. Hydrogen peroxide breaks down into oxygen and water. As a small amount of hydrogen peroxide generates a large volume of oxygen, the oxygen quickly pushes out of the container. The soapy water traps the oxygen, creating bubbles, and turns into foam. About 5-10 drops of food coloring could also be added before the catalyst to dramatize the effect. How rapidly the reaction occurs will depend on the concentration of hydrogen peroxide used.

=== Chemical explanation ===
This experiment shows the catalyzed decomposition of hydrogen peroxide. Hydrogen peroxide (H_{2}O_{2}) decomposes into water and oxygen gas, which is in the form of foam, but normally the reaction is too slow to be easily perceived or measured:

$$\ce{2H2O2 -> 2H2O + O2 ^}$$

In normal conditions, this reaction takes place very slowly, therefore a catalyst is added to speed up the reaction, which will result in rapid formation of foam. The iodide ion from potassium iodide acts as a catalyst and speeds up the reaction while remaining chemically unchanged in the reaction process. The iodide ion changes the mechanism by which the reaction occurs:

$$\begin{array}{llllll}
\ce{H2O2}
&+\
\ce{I-}
&\ce{->
H2O}
&+\
\ce{IO-}
\\
\ce{H2O2}
&+\
\ce{IO-}
&\ce{->
H2O}
&+\
\ce{O2 ^}
&+\
\ce{I-}
\\
\hline
\ce{2H2O2}
&
&\ce{->
2H2O}
&+\
\ce{O2 ^}
&
&\Delta_\mathrm{r}H^\circ = -196\text{ kJ/mol}
\end{array}$$

The reaction is exothermic; the foam produced is hot (about 75 °C or 167 °F). A glowing splint can be used to show that the gas produced is oxygen. The rate of foam formation measured in volume per time unit has a positive correlation with the peroxide concentration (v/V%), which means that more foam will be generated per unit time when a more concentrated peroxide solution is used.

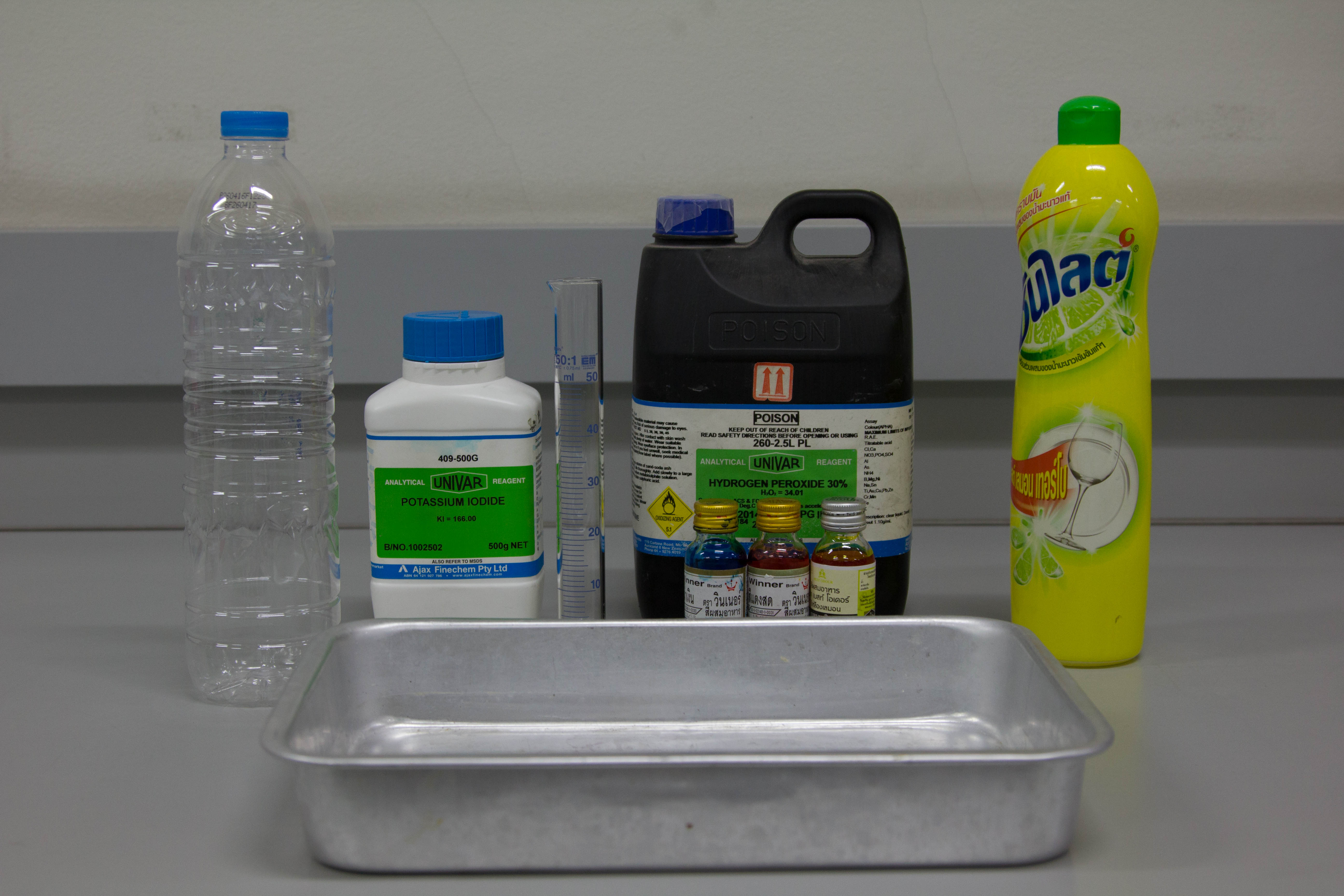
Materials for the experiment

== See also ==
- Black snake (firework)
- Carbon snake
- Soda geyser
