= Taylor Wilson =

American nuclear physicist (born 1994)

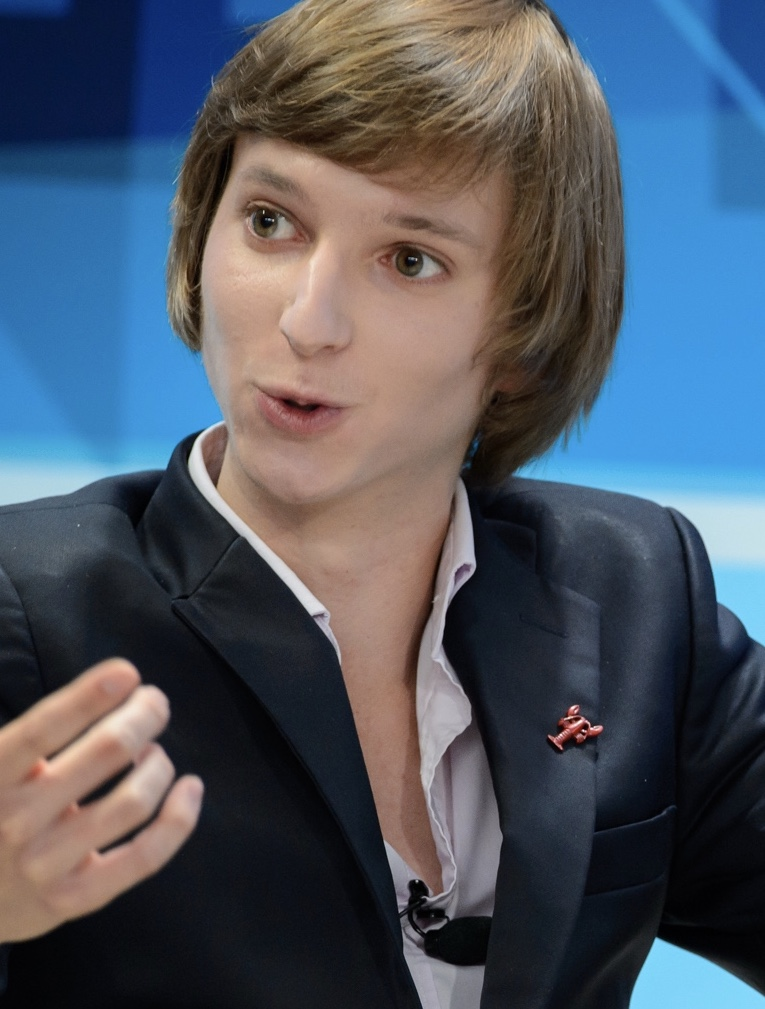
- Wilson in 2016
- Born: May 7, 1994 (age 32); Texarkana, Arkansas, United States
- Occupation: Nuclear science
- Awards: Thiel Fellowship

Taylor Wilson (born May 7, 1994) is an American nuclear physicist and science advocate. Wilson achieved controlled nuclear fusion in 2008 when he was 14 years old. He has designed a compact radiation detector to enhance airport security. Wilson works to expand applications for nuclear medicine, and to design and develop modular power reactor technology.

== Personal life and education ==
Taylor Wilson was born in 1994 in Texarkana, Arkansas to Kenneth and Tiffany Wilson. His father is the owner of a Coca-Cola bottling plant, and his mother was a yoga instructor. Wilson was initially interested in rocketry and space science, before entering the field of nuclear science at age 10, receiving much support from his parents. He attended the Davidson Academy of Nevada in Reno, Nevada for high school. He resides in Reno, Nevada.

In June 2012, Wilson was awarded a Thiel Fellowship. The two-year $100,000 fellowship requires recipients to forgo college for the duration of the fellowship. In 2017, Wilson was named a member of the Helena Group, a think tank focused on executing projects that improve the world.

== Scientific projects ==
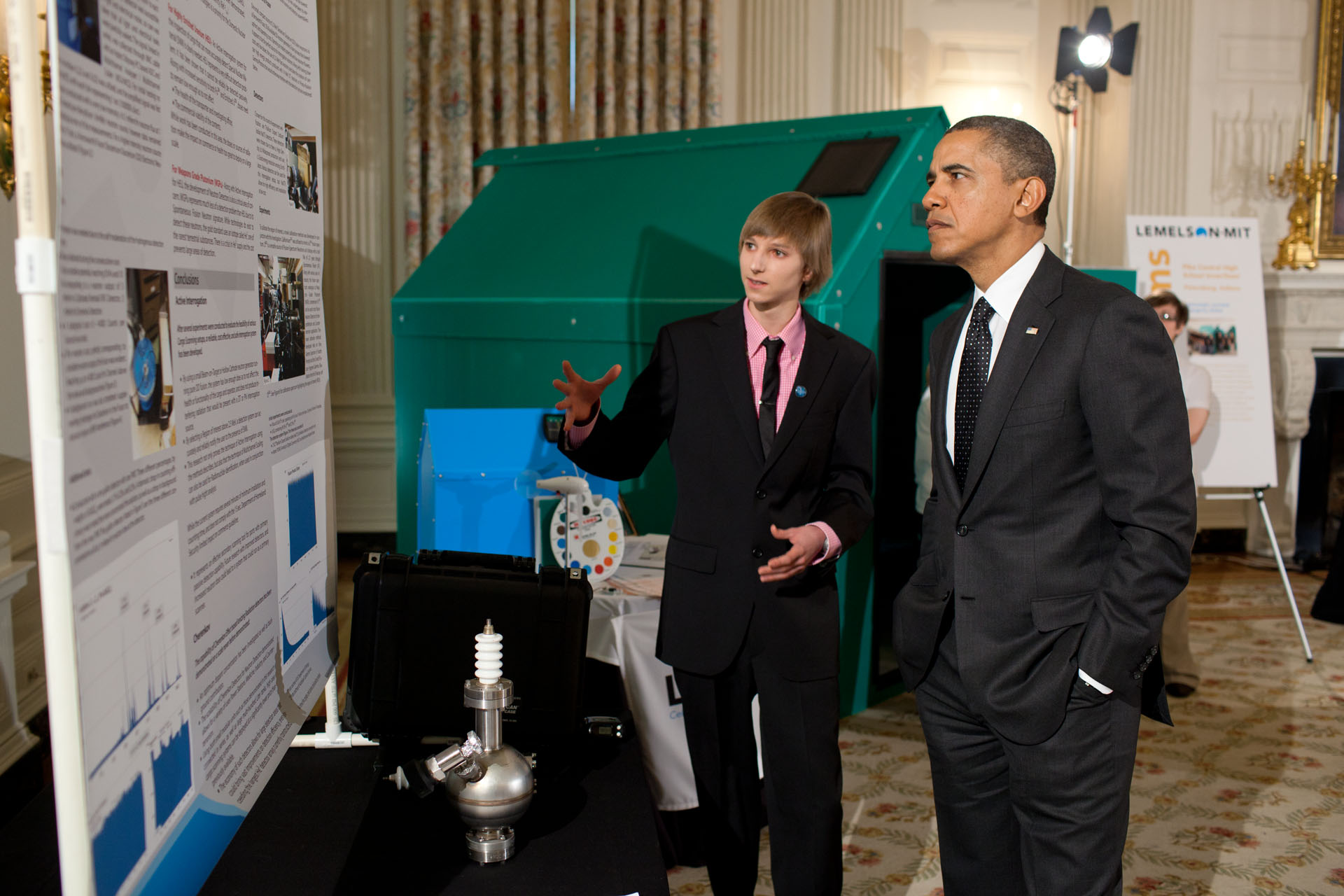
Taylor Wilson presenting nuclear security work to Barack Obama, February 7, 2012

=== Fusion reactor ===
In 2008, Wilson achieved nuclear fusion that generated a temperature forty times as hot as that of the sun using an inertial electrostatic confinement (IEC) device, which was a variation of the fusor that was invented by Philo T. Farnsworth in 1964.

=== Nuclear detection ===
In May 2010, Wilson entered the Intel International Science and Engineering Fair in San Jose, California, and won several awards for his project titled "Fission Vision: The Detection of Prompt and Delayed Induced Fission Gamma Radiation, and the Application to the Detection of Proliferated Nuclear Materials."

In May 2011, Wilson entered his radiation detector in the Intel International Science and Engineering Fair in Los Angeles, California, against a field of 1,500 competitors and won a US$50,000 award. The project, "Countering Nuclear Terrorism: Novel Active and Passive Techniques for Detecting Nuclear Threats", won the First Place Award in the Physics and Astronomy Category, Best of Category Award, and the Intel Young Scientist Award. Wilson stated he hopes to test and rapidly field the devices to US ports for counterterrorism purposes.

The U.S. Department of Homeland Security and U.S. Department of Energy offered federal funding to Wilson concerning research he has conducted in building inexpensive Cherenkov radiation detectors.

=== Fission reactor ===
On February 27, 2013, at TED 2013, Wilson presented his ideas on the benefits of building small underground nuclear fission reactors that are self-contained and use down-blended uranium and plutonium from decommissioned nuclear weapons as fuel.

== In popular culture ==
He is the subject of the biography The Boy Who Played with Fusion, by Tom Clynes, published in 2015, the film rights to which have been optioned by 20th Century Fox.

== See also ==
- David Hahn
- Richard Handl
- Megatons to Megawatts, an anti-proliferation program
