= Soda geyser =

Eruption caused by mixing Diet Coke with Mentos

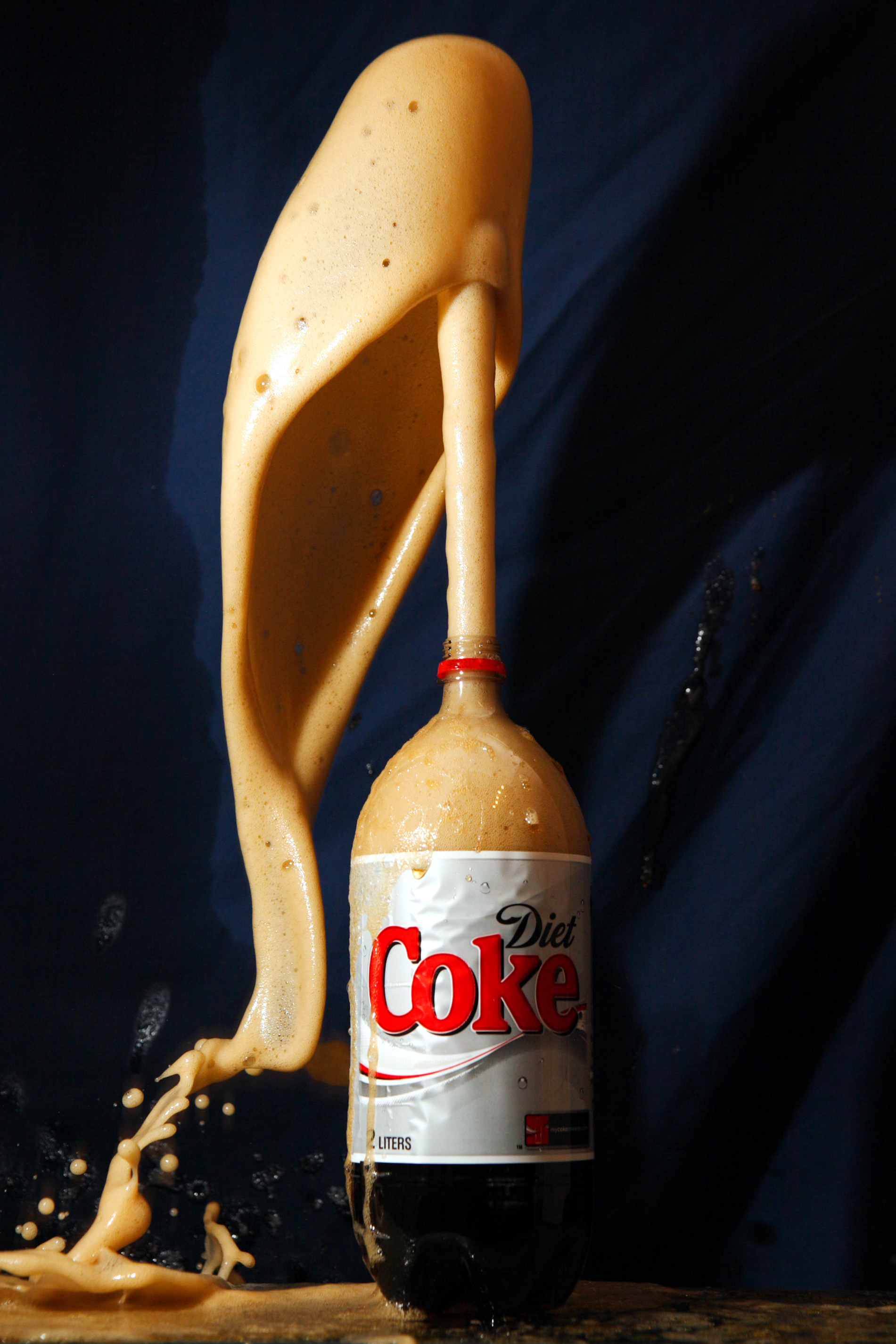
A 2-litre (0.44 imp gal; 0.53 US gal) bottle of Diet Coke forming a soda geyser after Mentos was dropped into it

A soda geyser is a physical reaction between a carbonated beverage, usually Diet Coke, and Mentos mints that causes the beverage to be expelled from its container. The candies catalyze the release of gas from the beverage, which creates an eruption that pushes most of the liquid up and out of the bottle. Lee Marek and "Marek's Kid Scientists" were the first to publicly demonstrate the experiment on the Late Show with David Letterman in 1999. Steve Spangler's televised demonstration of the eruption in 2005 became popular on YouTube, launching a chain of several other Diet Coke and Mentos experiment viral videos. Experiments carried out at altitudes ranging from below sea level in Death Valley to the summit of Pikes Peak have demonstrated that the reaction works better at higher elevations.

== History ==
In the 1910s, Wint-O-Green Life Savers were used to create soda geysers. The tubes of candies were threaded onto a pipe cleaner and dropped into the soft drink to create a geyser. At the end of the 1990s, the manufacturer of Wintergreen Lifesavers increased the size of the mints, and they no longer fit in the mouth of soda bottles. Science teachers found that Mentos candies had the same effect when dropped into a bottle of any carbonated soft drink.

Lee Marek and "Marek's Kid Scientists" performed the Diet Coke and Mentos experiment on the Late Show with David Letterman in 1999. In March 2002, Steve Spangler, a science educator, did the demonstration on KUSA-TV, an NBC affiliate, in Denver, Colorado. The Diet Coke and Mentos geyser experiment became an internet sensation in September 2005. The experiment became a subject of the television show MythBusters in 2006. Spangler signed a licensing agreement with Perfetti Van Melle, the maker of Mentos, after inventing an apparatus aimed to make it easier to drop the Mentos into the bottle and produce a large soda geyser. Amazing Toys, Spangler's toy company, released the Geyser Tube toys in February 2007. In October 2010, a Guinness World Record of 2,865 simultaneous geysers was set at an event organized by Perfetti Van Melle at the SM Mall of Asia Complex, in Manila, Philippines. This record was afterward beaten in November 2014 by another event organized by Perfetti Van Melle and Chupa Chups in León, Guanajuato, Mexico, where 4,334 Mentos and soda fountains were set off simultaneously.

== Chemistry ==
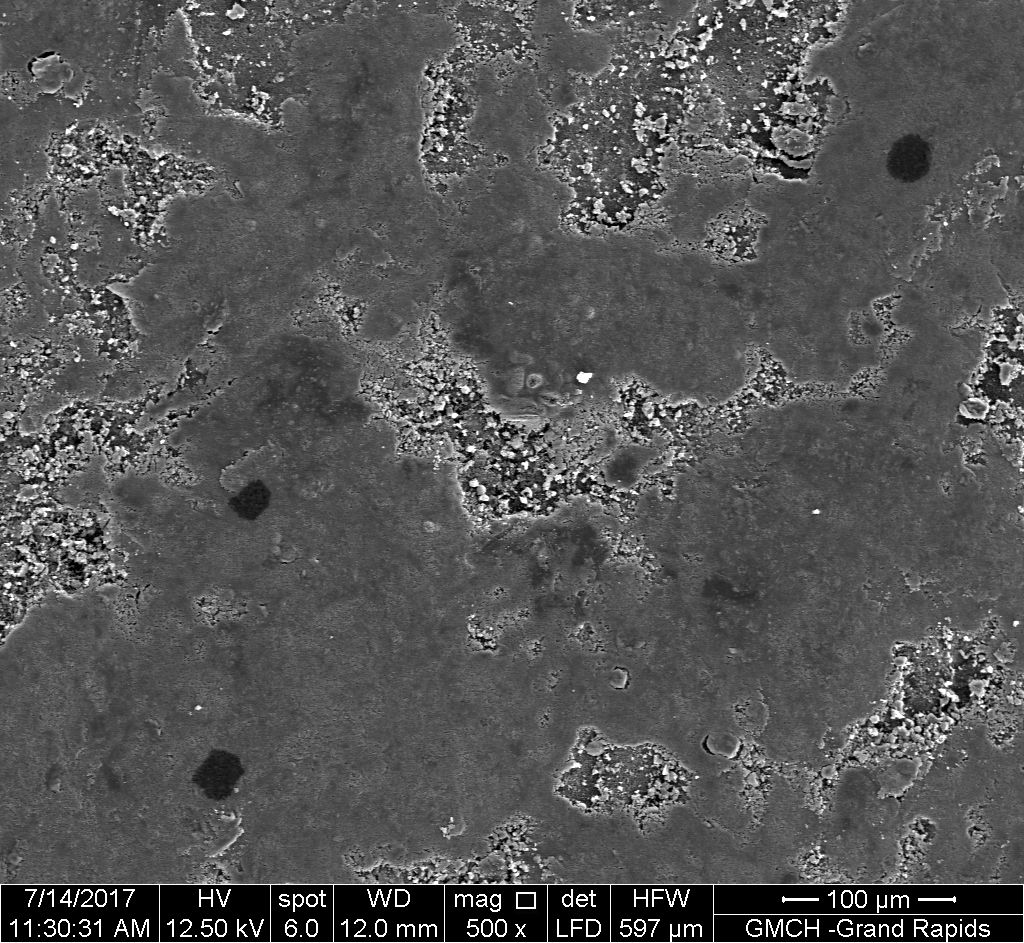
SEM image of the surface of a Mentos candy

The eruption is caused by a physical reaction, rather than any chemical reaction. The addition of the Mentos leads to the rapid nucleation of carbon dioxide gas bubbles, degassing the solution:

CO_{2}(aq) → CO_{2}(g)

The conversion of dissolved carbon dioxide to gaseous carbon dioxide forms rapidly expanding gas bubbles in the soda, which pushes the beverage contents out of the container. Experimental measurements suggest that as many as 14 million bubbles are produced per liter of soda in this experiment.

Carbonated sodas contain elevated levels of carbon dioxide under pressure. The solution becomes supersaturated with carbon dioxide when the bottle is opened, and the pressure is released. Under these conditions, carbon dioxide begins to degas from the solution, forming gas bubbles.

The activation energy for bubble nucleation (formation of bubbles) depends on where the bubble forms. It is very high for bubbles that form in the liquid itself (homogeneous nucleation), and much lower if bubble growth occurs within tiny bubbles trapped in some other surface (heterogeneous nucleation). Bubble nucleation and growth in carbonated beverages almost always occur by heterogeneous nucleation: diffusion of carbon dioxide into pre-existing bubbles within the beverage. When dissolved gas diffuses into bubbles that already exist in a liquid, it is called Type IV bubble nucleation. When the pressure is released from a soda bottle upon opening it, dissolved carbon dioxide can escape into any tiny bubble located within the beverage. These ready-made bubbles (which are nucleation sites) exist in things such as tiny fibers or non-wettable crevices on the sides of the bottle. Because there usually are very few such pre-existing bubbles, the degassing process is slow. Mentos candies contain millions of cavities, roughly 1-3 μm in size, that remain unwetted when added to a soda. Because of this, the addition of Mentos candies to a carbonated beverage provides enormous numbers of pre-existing bubbles into which dissolved carbon dioxide can escape. Thus, adding Mentos candies to a carbonated beverage introduces millions of nucleation sites into the drink, which allows for degassing that is rapid enough to support a jet of foam out of a bottle. While a Mentos candy contains millions of cavities, it is likely that only about 100,000 cavities actively nucleate bubbles on any single Mentos candy placed in a carbonated beverage.

Pre-existing bubbles provide a way for the reaction to occur without requiring bubbles to form within the liquid itself (homogeneous nucleation). Because Type IV nucleation sites (such as found on Mentos) allow the reaction to proceed with substantially lower activation energy, Mentos candies can appropriately be considered a catalyst of the process. As another example, dropping grains of salt or sand into the solution provides Type IV nucleation sites, lowers the activation energy compared to that of homogeneous nucleation, and increases the rate of carbon dioxide degassing.

The physical characteristics of Mentos (surface roughness) have the effect of drastically reducing the activation energy for carbon dioxide bubble formation so that the nucleation rate becomes exceedingly high. The activation energy for the release of carbon dioxide from Diet Coke by the addition of Mentos is 25 kJ mol^{−1}. The foaming is aided by the presence of food additives such as potassium benzoate, aspartame, sugars, citric acid, and flavorings in Diet Coke, all of which influence the degree to which water can foam. It has been claimed that gelatin and gum arabic in the Mentos candy enhance the fountain, but experiments have shown that these candy additives do not affect the fountain.

The nucleation reaction can start with any heterogeneous surface, such as rock salt, but Mentos have been found to work better than most. Tonya Coffey, a physicist at Appalachian State University, suggested that aspartame in diet drinks lowers the surface tension in the water and causes a bigger reaction, but that caffeine does not accelerate the process. However, experiments have shown that some dissolved solids that increase the surface tension of water (such as sugars) also increase fountain heights. Furthermore, it has also been demonstrated that addition of certain concentrations of alcohol (which lowers surface tension) to carbonated beverages decreases fountain heights. These results suggest that additives serve to enhance geyser heights not by decreasing surface tension, but rather by some other mechanism. One possibility is that additives decrease bubble coalescence, which leads to smaller bubble sizes and greater foaming ability in the water. Thus, the geyser reaction will still work even using sugared drinks, but diet is commonly used both for the sake of a larger geyser as well as to avoid having to clean up the stickier residue left by a sugared soda.

Additional explanations for why diet sodas outperform regular sodas in this experiment have been proposed. For example, it has been suggested that the higher viscosity of regular sodas as compared to diet sodas could inhibit the formation of the fountain in regular sodas, leading to shorter fountains. It has also been suggested that the more stable foams observed in diet sodas as compared to regular sodas could contribute to the taller geysers observed in diet sodas.

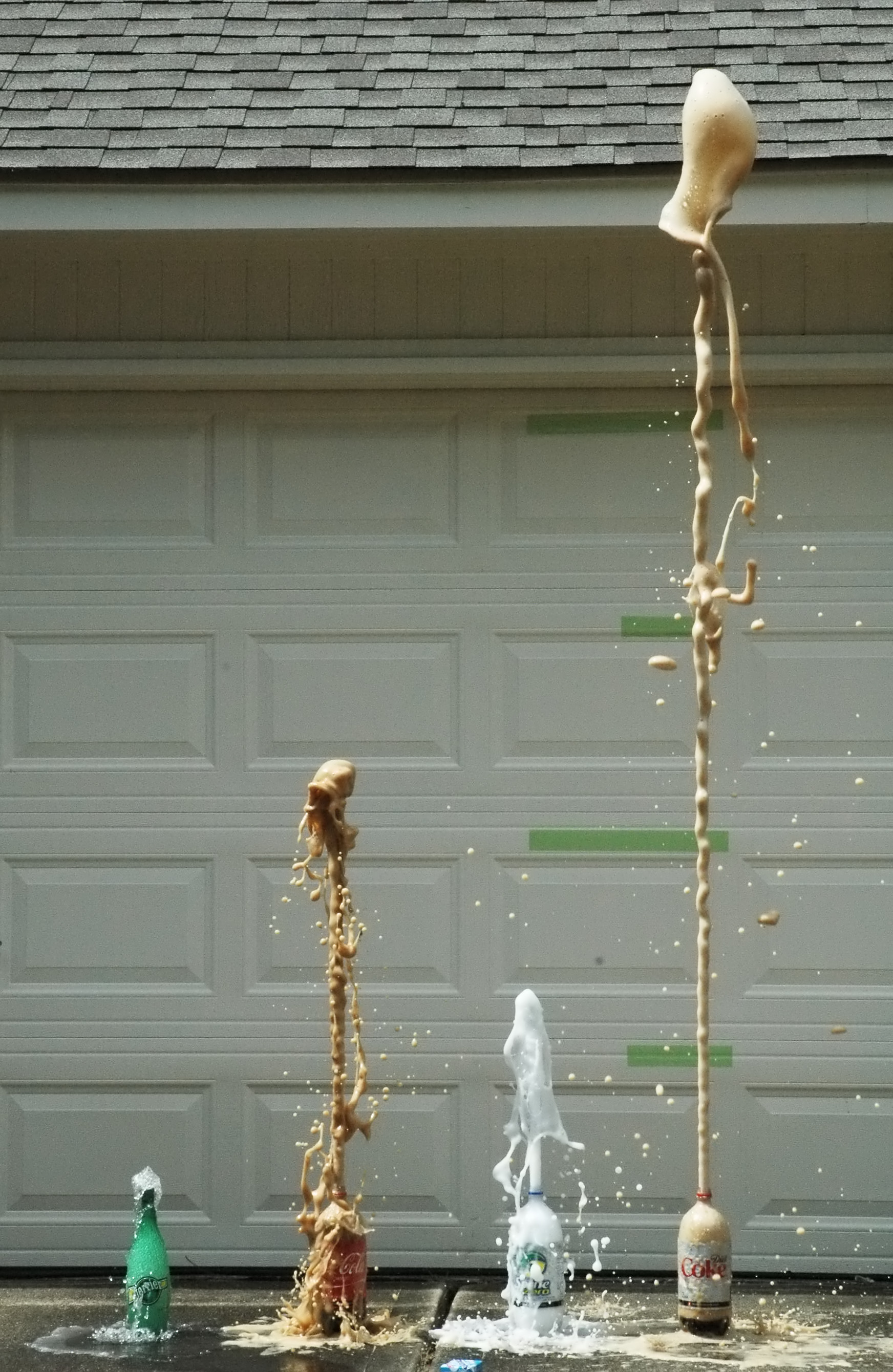
From left to right: action of five Mentos candies (per bottle) with Perrier, classic Coke, Sprite, and Diet Coke

Soda geyser

Diet Coke and Mentos eruption

== Alternatives ==
While Diet Coke and Mentos are the most common way to make a soda geyser, they are not the only options. Many consider Diet Coke to be the optimal option. While Diet Coke has been studied and suggested that it has the strongest effect, at least one other study has demonstrated that all diet sodas essentially work equally well within experimental error. Nevertheless, any carbonated beverage will work. As for the Mentos, many things work to nucleate carbonated beverages such as other candy, metal and ceramic spheres, and even sand.

"Boiling stones" are commonly available in chemistry laboratories. They are chips of unglazed ceramic, which contain abundant nucleation sites. They are dropped into containers, such as test tubes, flasks, and beakers, being heated. Heating liquids in clean glassware (which has few nucleation sites) can result in large steam bubbles forming when the contents reaches its boiling point. These large bubbles can propel the boiling liquid out of its container causing hazards in the lab. Boiling stones provide nucleation sites which result in smooth boiling rather than geyser eruptions.

== See also ==
- Solubility
- Elephant's toothpaste
- Black snake (firework)
- Carbon snake
- Cold-water geyser
