= Theodore Gray =

American science author

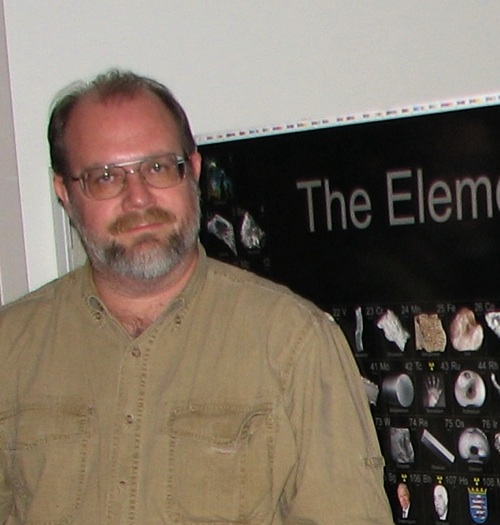
- Born: 18 November 1964 (age 61); Urbana, Illinois, United States
- Education: University of Illinois
- Known for: Co-founder of Wolfram Research prominent science author co-founder of Touch Press
- Scientific career
- Fields: Mathematics, chemistry, computing, publishing
- Workplaces: Wolfram Research, Touch Press

Theodore W. "Theo" Gray is a co-founder of Wolfram Research, science author, and co-founder of app developer Touch Press.

== Education ==
Theodore Gray was educated at the University of Illinois Laboratory High School. He would later graduate with a B.S. in chemistry from University of Illinois at Urbana–Champaign in 1986.

== Career ==
In 1987, Gray left a PhD program in theoretical chemistry at the University of California at Berkeley to work with Stephen Wolfram. In that same year, he co-founded Wolfram Research. His initial work for the company involved creating the influential notebook user interface for Mathematica. Gray would eventually leave Wolfram Research to become a writer and publisher full-time.

After amassing thousands of samples of elements, he assembled them into a four-legged physical table representing the periodic table. The finished table was awarded the 2011 ACS Grady Stack Award for Interpreting Chemistry for the Public, as well as the 2002 Ig Nobel Award for Chemistry. Gray's love of the periodic table would lead him to team up with photographer Nick Mann in creating The Elements: A Visual Exploration of Every Known Atom in the Universe and Elements Vault.

For many years, Gray wrote a regular column for Popular Science entitled "Gray Matter". The column was a finalist for a National Magazine Award for Best Column in 2010. In 2009, a collection of articles by Gray was published under the title Mad Science: Experiments You Can Do at Home—But Probably Shouldn't. A sequel to the book, Mad Science 2: Experiments You Can Do At Home, But STILL Probably Shouldn't was published in 2013.

In 2010, Gray founded Touch Press together with Max Whitby, John Cromie and Stephen Wolfram shortly after the announcement of the launch of the iPad. The company was created to develop innovative educational apps using the technology of the iPad to its full potential. The first published app was "The Elements," and in 2014 Gray released "Molecules", which allows users to touch and discover the basic building blocks of the world. Of Touch Press's "Disney Animated," which was named the best iPad app of 2013 worldwide by Apple, iTunes's App Editor noted, "We’re absolutely spellbound". The app won a BAFTA award in 2014.

Gray also co-founded Pale Gray Labs with Nina Paley.

Gray has developed a range of acrylic model kits, which he named "Mechanical GIFs" (as a nod to animated drawings on the internet), to show "how common and uncommon machines, mechanisms, gadgets, and devices work".

In July 2018, Gray was invited to Beijing on behalf of The Newton Project by its founder, Jizhe Xu, to serve as a consulting advisor.

Throughout his career, Gray has been an advocate for a broader engagement between the scientific community and the public at large.

== Works ==
- How Things Work: The Inner Life of Everyday Machines, Black Dog & Leventhal Publishers, 2019, 256pp. ISBN 978-0316445436
- Reactions: An Illustrated Exploration of Elements, Molecules, and Change in the Universe, Black Dog & Leventhal, 2017, 240pp. ISBN 978-0316391221
- Molecules: The Elements and the Architecture of Everything, Black Dog & Leventhal, 2014, 240pp. ISBN 1-57912-971-4
- Theodore Gray's Elements Vault: Treasures of the Periodic Table with Removable Archival Documents and Real Element Samples—Including Pure Gold! Black Dog & Leventhal, 2011, 128pp. ISBN 1-57912-880-7
- (with photographer Nick Mann) The Elements: A Visual Exploration of Every Known Atom in the Universe, Black Dog & Leventhal, 2009, 240pp. ISBN 1-57912-814-9
- Theo Gray's Mad Science: Experiments You Can Do At Home—But Probably Shouldn't, Black Dog & Leventhal, 2009, 240pp. ISBN 1-57912-791-6
- (with Jerry Glynn) The Beginner's Guide to Mathematica Version 3, Cambridge University Press, 1997, 355pp. ISBN 0521622026
- Theo Gray's Mad Science 2: Experiments You Can Do At Home, But STILL Probably Shouldn't, Black Dog & Leventhal, 2013, 240pp. ISBN 1-57912-932-3

== See also ==
- Amateur chemistry
- List of Ig Nobel Prize winners
