= Starlite =

Thermally insulating material

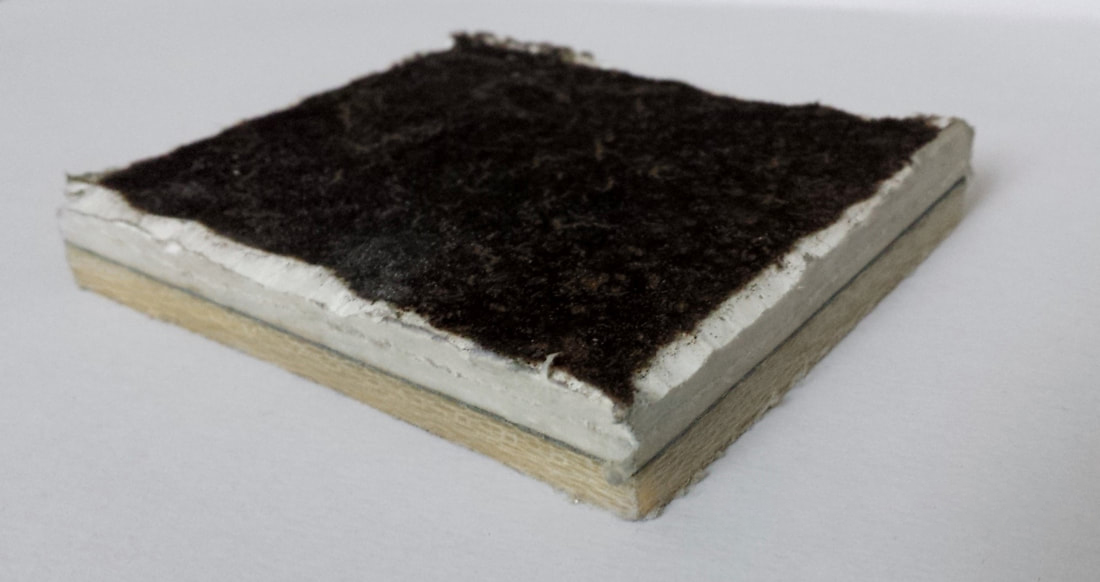
White sands test sample, owned by Thermashield, LLC

Starlite is an intumescent material that is claimed to be able to withstand and insulate from extreme heat. It was invented by British hairdresser and amateur chemist Maurice Ward (1933–2011) during the 1970s and 1980s, and received significant publicity after coverage of the material aired in 1990 on the BBC science and technology show Tomorrow's World. The name Starlite was coined by Ward's granddaughter Kimberly. The American company Thermashield, LLC, says it acquired the rights to Starlite in 2013 and replicated the material. Thermashield is the only company to have publicly demonstrated the technology and to have had samples tested by third parties.

== Properties ==
Live demonstrations on Tomorrow's World and BBC Radio 4 showed that an egg coated in Starlite could remain raw and cold enough to be picked up with a bare hand, even after five minutes in the flame of an oxyacetylene torch. It would also prevent a blowtorch from damaging a human hand. When heat is applied, the material chars, which creates an expanding low density carbon foam that is very thermally resistant. It was reported that it took nine seconds to heat a warhead to 900 °C (1,650 °F), and that a thin layer of the compound prevented the temperature from rising above 40 °C (104 °F).

Starlite reacts more efficiently as more heat is applied. The MOD's report, as published in Jane's International Defence Review 4/1993, speculated that this was due to particle scatter of an ablative layer, thereby increasing the reflective properties of the compound. Testing continues for thermal conductivity and capacity under different conditions. Starlite may become contaminated with dust residue and so degrade with use. Keith Lewis, a retired MOD officer, noted that the material guards only against thermal damage and not the physical damage caused by an explosion, which can destroy the insulating layer.

Materials scientist Mark Miodownik has described Starlite as a type of intumescent paint, and one of the materials he would most like to see for himself. He has also admitted some doubt about the commercial potential of Starlite. Its main use appears to be as a flame retardant.

== Composition ==
Starlite's composition is a closely guarded secret. "The actual composition of Starlite is known only to Maurice and one or two members of his family," former Chief Scientific Adviser to the Ministry of Defence Sir Ronald Mason averred. It is said to contain a variety of organic polymers and co-polymers with both organic and inorganic additives, including borates and small quantities of ceramics and other special barrier ingredients—up to 21 in all. Perhaps uniquely for a material said to be thermal proof, it is said to be not entirely inorganic but up to 90 per cent organic. Nicola McDermott, Ward's youngest daughter, stated that Starlite is "natural" and edible and that it has been fed to dogs and horses with no ill effects.

The American company Thermashield, LLC, which owns the Starlite formula, stated in a radio interview that Starlite is not made from household ingredients and that there is no PVA glue or soda in it.

Thermashield's claims that Starlite has successfully passed femtosecond laser testing at the Georgia Institute of Technology and ASTM D635-15 Standard Testing.

== Commercialisation ==
Ward allowed various organisations such as the Atomic Weapons Establishment and ICI to conduct tests on samples, but did not permit them to retain samples for fear of reverse engineering. Ward maintained that his invention was worth billions. Sir Ronald Mason told a reporter in 1993, "I started this path with Maurice very sceptical. I’m totally convinced of the reality of the claims." He further states, "We don't still quite understand how it works, but that it works is undoubtedly the case."

NASA became involved in Starlite in 1994, and NASA engineer Rosendo 'Rudy' Naranjo talked about its potential in a Dateline NBC report. The Dateline reporter opined that Starlite could perhaps help with the fragile Space Shuttle heat shield. Naranjo said of their discussions with Ward, "We have done a lot of evaluation and... we know all the tremendous possibilities that this material has."

Boeing, which was the main contractor for the Space Shuttles in 1994, became interested in the potential of Starlite to eliminate flammable materials in their jets.

By the time of Ward's death in 2011 there appears to have been no commercialisation of Starlite, and the formulation of the material had not been released to the public.

- According to a 2016 broadcast of the BBC programme The Naked Scientists, Ward took his secrets with him when he died.
- According to a 2020 BBC Online release in the BBC Reel category, Thermashield, LLC had purchased all of Ward's notes, equipment and other related materials and is working towards a viable commercial product.

== Replication ==
YouTuber Ben Cusick, of the channel NightHawkInLight, attempted in 2018 to create materials that replicated the properties of Starlite. Observing that the mechanism that generates an expanding carbon foam in Starlite is similar to black snake fireworks, Cusick concocted a formula using cornstarch, baking soda, and PVA glue. After drying, the hardened material creates a thin layer of carbon foam on the surface when exposed to high heat, insulating the material from further heat transfer. He later improved it by substituting flour, sugar and borax in place of PVA glue and baking soda. Using borax and flour made the material cheaper, mold and insect resistant, and workable when dry.

Several experiments testing the replication and variant recipes showed that they could handle lasers, thermite, and torches, but the replication recipe failed when it was used to make a crucible for an induction furnace.

== Additional evidence and documentation ==
=== Dr. Allen Atkins and McDonnell Douglas testing (1997) ===
In 1997, following McDonnell Douglas’ merger with Boeing, Dr. Allen Atkins became Vice President of Technology for Boeing at Phantom Works in St. Louis, Missouri. He led teams evaluating advanced materials, including Starlite. Historical records confirm that McDonnell Douglas/Boeing conducted tests using Starlite samples, with Dr. Atkins' expertise in stealth technology and aerospace contributing to professional interest in Starlite's properties.

=== NASA interest and Dateline NBC coverage ===
While a document purporting NASA endorsement has been shown to be falsified by an unknown party, legitimate media and public records demonstrate that NASA engineers took an informal interest in Starlite. Rosendo "Rudy" Naranjo, a NASA aerospace engineer, appeared in a Dateline NBC segment discussing Starlite's unique heat resistance, stating, "Any place where there is heat it'll have applications." This reflects NASA's informal review of Starlite's potential applications.

== Controversies ==
A forensic investigation by The Aurora Press into Starlite raised some doubts about many high-profile claims regarding the material's testing and validation. The investigation revealed that a document from NASA could not be corroborated, and despite there being a video documentary linking NASA and Starlite from NBC's Dateline, no formal documents were found.

A FOIA request submitted to NASA to clarify its alleged endorsement received the following response: 'A thorough search was conducted... and no emails from Rosendo “Rudy” Naranjo, produced during the requested timeframe (1993–2001) or any other period, were located', despite the aforementioned NBC Video Documentary featuring an interview with Rudy while in the role of Program Manager for NASA.

Furthermore, The Aurora Press failed to address the connection between Dr. Allen Atkins, vice president of technology for Boeing at Phantom Works (formerly McDonnell Douglas) in St. Louis, Mo., and Starlite. This assessment was further corroborated by internal memos from Dr. Allen R. Atkins, who in 2002 documented Boeing’s direct testing of Starlite samples. Dr. Atkins’ memos describe Boeing engineers conducting thermal and laser tests, with results indicating that 'they had never seen anything like Starlite before,' and urging leadership not to miss a potential technological breakthrough.

The Aurora Press also uncovered evidence that one document had been demonstrably falsified, a claim which was corroborated by Thermashield's CEO. The origin of the NASA document in question is unknown and the document has not been referenced by Thermashield.

The investigation found that claims of NATO's involvement in testing Starlite at White Sands Missile Range were contradicted by official records, specifically through a FOIA request submitted to the United States Department of Defense. The request sought "all reports, memos, and/or email records relevant to the June 1991 testing of Starlite at White Sands Missile Range, a simulated nuclear blast test conducted in partnership with the United Kingdom's Special Air Service (SAS)". The United States Department of Defense responded, stating that they had "completed a search of documents and found no records".

The investigation also examined the alleged endorsement and testing by the Royal Signals and Radar Establishment (RSRE); this claim was disproved by the fact that RSRE had to exist before the alleged tests took place. However, multiple officials from the UK's Ministry of Defence at the time, including Chief Scientific Adviser Sir Ronald Mason and Dr. Keith Lewis, a retired British Ministry of Defence scientific officer, are on public record, such as BBC interviews, confirming the existence and validating the thermal properties of the Starlite invention.

Lastly, the investigation found that the Atomic Weapons Establishment (AWE) categorically denied conducting any tests on Starlite or holding relevant information. In a FOIA request, they stated, "We can confirm that the Atomic Weapons Establishment (AWE) did not carry out any tests on the material... and does not hold any relevant information."

== See also ==
- Lost inventions
- Firepaste
