= Ice pack =

Filled bag designed to be frozen

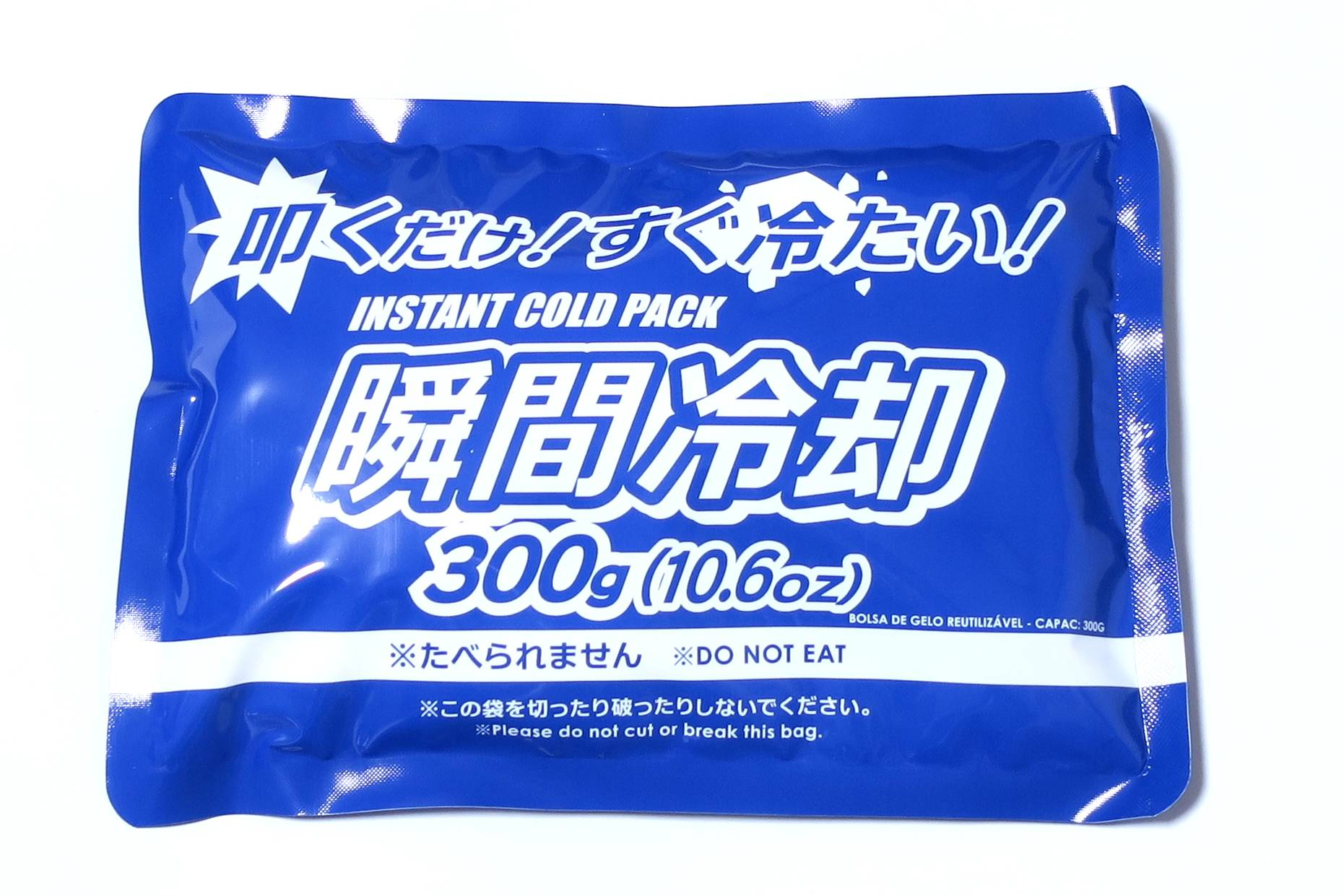
An ice pack

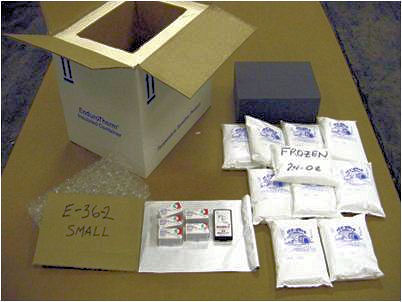
Shipment of vaccine in insulated box with gel packs

An ice pack, or cold pack (or, in specific cases, gel pack), is a portable bag filled with water or another liquid, or refrigerant gel, meant to provide cooling. They can be divided into the reusable type, which works as a thermal mass and requires freezing, or the instant type, which cools itself down using chemicals but can only be used once. The instant type is generally limited to medical use as a cold compress to alleviate the pain of minor injuries, while the reusable type is both used as a cold compress and to keep food cool in portable coolers or in insulated shipping containers to keep products cool during transport.

== Reusable packs ==
To be prepared for use, the pack is first placed in a freezer. Both ice and other non-toxic refrigerants can absorb a considerable amount of heat before they warm above their melting point.

Ice packs are used in coolers to keep perishable foods (especially meats, dairy products, eggs, etc.) below the 5–75 °C (41–167 °F) danger zone when outside a refrigerator or freezer, and to keep drinks pleasantly cool. The amount of ice needed varies with the amount of food, its initial temperature, the thermal insulation of the cooler, and the ambient temperature and exposure to direct sunlight. Ice initially well below freezing temperature will last a little longer.

Water has a much higher latent heat of fusion than most substances, and a melting temperature which is convenient and easily attained with, for example, a household freezer. Additives to improve the properties of water are often used. For example, substances can be added to prevent bacterial growth in the pack, or to prevent the water from solidifying so it remains a thick gel throughout use.

Gel packs are often made of non-toxic materials that will remain a slow-flowing gel, and therefore will not spill easily or cause contamination if the container breaks. Gel packs may be made by adding hydroxyethyl cellulose, sodium polyacrylate, superabsorbent polymer or vinyl-coated silica gel.

=== Hot-or-cold packs ===
Hot-or-cold packs are ice packs that are rated for high temperature use. They can be used as a normal reusable ice pack by storing in a freezer, but they can also be heated in water or a microwave oven to reach the desired temperature. The first hot and cold pack was introduced in 1948 with the name Hot-R-Cold-Pak and could be chilled in a refrigerator or heated in hot water. The first reusable hot cold pack that could be heated in boiling water or a microwave oven was first patented in 1973.

== Instant cold packs ==
An instant cold pack is a single-use device that consists of two bags: one containing water, inside another one containing ammonium nitrate, calcium ammonium nitrate or urea. When the inner bag of water is broken by squeezing the package, it dissolves the solid in an endothermic process, quickly lowering the pack's temperature. This process absorbs heat from the surroundings.

Instant cold packs are a convenient replacement for crushed ice used as first aid on sport injuries or heat illness, and can be carried as first aid to remote or wilderness areas where ice is unavailable. However, they do not provide as much or as long-lasting cooling as ice.

== Safety concerns ==
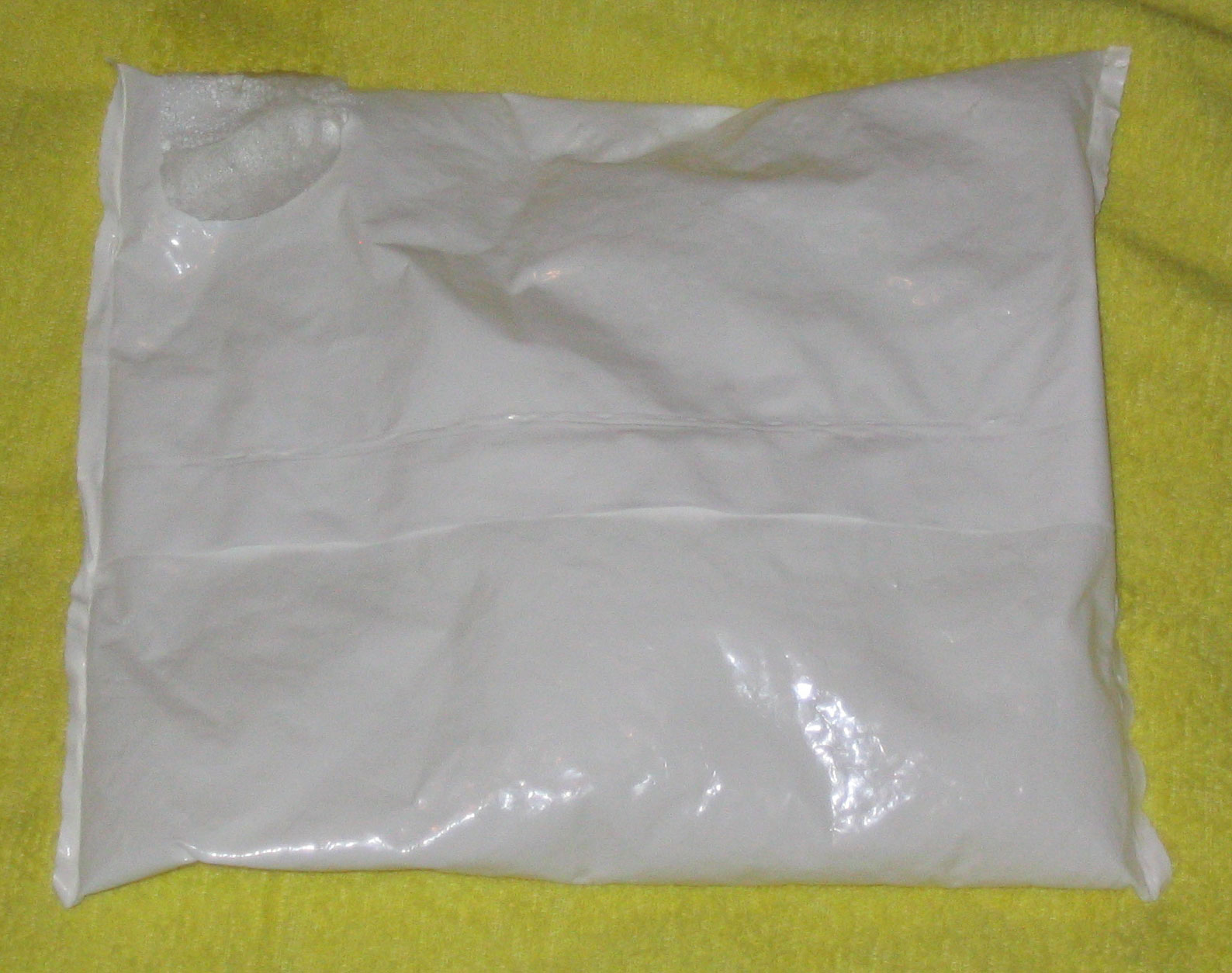
An ice pack with gel leaking out of a hole in the upper left corner

Gel packs have been made with diethylene glycol and ethylene glycol. Both can cause illness if ingested in large amounts, making them unsuitable for use with food. The US Consumer Product Safety Commission recalled such packs.

== See also ==
- Cryotherapy
- Hot pack
- Hand warmer
- Hilotherapy
- Phase-change material
- Enthalpy of fusion
