= Maurice Ward =

British inventor

- Maurice Ward holding a blowlamp to a sheet of Starlite
- Born: 1933
- Died: 2011 (aged 77–78)
- Occupations: Inventor and hairdresser
- Spouse: Eileen Ward
- Children: Four daughters
- Website: Maurice Ward

Maurice Ward was a British inventor best known for his invention of Starlite, a thermal shielding material. He was a former hairdresser from Hartlepool, County Durham, England. Ward believed he should not sell his material directly or allow unsupervised research due to the potential for reverse engineering, and he maintained that he should keep 51% ownership of the formula for Starlite because he valued the material to be worth billions; this is believed to have stunted its commercial success. The formulation for Starlite, a technology which might have revolutionised the world of aerospace and materials science, may have been lost with his death, although, he hinted during a radio talk show interview that his family might hold information relating to the invention. Starlite was reported to have been acquired by Thermashield, LLC from Ward's family in 2013.

== Biography ==
Maurice Ward worked as a hairdresser during the 1960s, and he took pride in his work. He once said in an interview, "What L'Oreal and Garnier are doing today, I was doing 50 years ago. And they still haven't got it right."

He was a tinkerer and liked to invent things in his spare time. This hobby led to him purchasing an extruder from ICI during the early 1980s.

It was this purchase that led to the invention of the material Starlite. This invention was inspired by the Manchester plane fire in 1985, during which 55 people aboard the plane died in 40 seconds due to toxic smoke inhalation. He invented the material after ICI requested a material for Citroën bonnets. The material that Ward extruded was a failure, and it was granulated and forgotten about until the aforementioned air crash, at which point Ward became inspired. "It interested me because it was an air disaster on the ground, and because it was the smoke and toxicity that killed people, not the fire. Fifty-five people died in 40 seconds. We thought we'd like to find something that doesn't burn very much, that would be useful," Ward mentioned in an interview.

He began to try to mix different formulations of heat-resistant, non-toxic plastics, which he casually referred to as "gubbins", mixing up to 20 formulations a day. Eventually, he produced a formulation that seemed promising, and used the extruder he had bought years before to make it into sheets. He tested it with a blowtorch, and it dissipated the heat perfectly. This is the material that became known as Starlite, so named by his eight-year-old granddaughter because she thought it was a good name.

This invention gained much publicity in the 1990s, after he was featured on the British television series Tomorrow's World, holding a blowtorch directly to an egg that had been coated in Starlite. After five minutes under direct contact with the flame, the egg was cracked open, revealing a completely raw egg inside. The invention worked so well that the egg had not even begun to cook. Ward repeated the demonstration several times on YouTube.

Rafael Silva, CEO of Thermashield, LLC, reported that he became friends with Ward in 2008. Silva said that, after sharing thoughts and ideas for two years, they agreed to start a business relationship; but shortly before Ward could share his secrets, he died. Two years later, Ward's family contacted Silva and agreed to sell all the rights to Starlite. Thermashield, LLC was formed in 2013 to acquire Starlite's formulations, production processes, original samples, the inventor's notes and other materials.

Ward died in May 2011 at the age of 78.
