= Calcium ammonium nitrate =

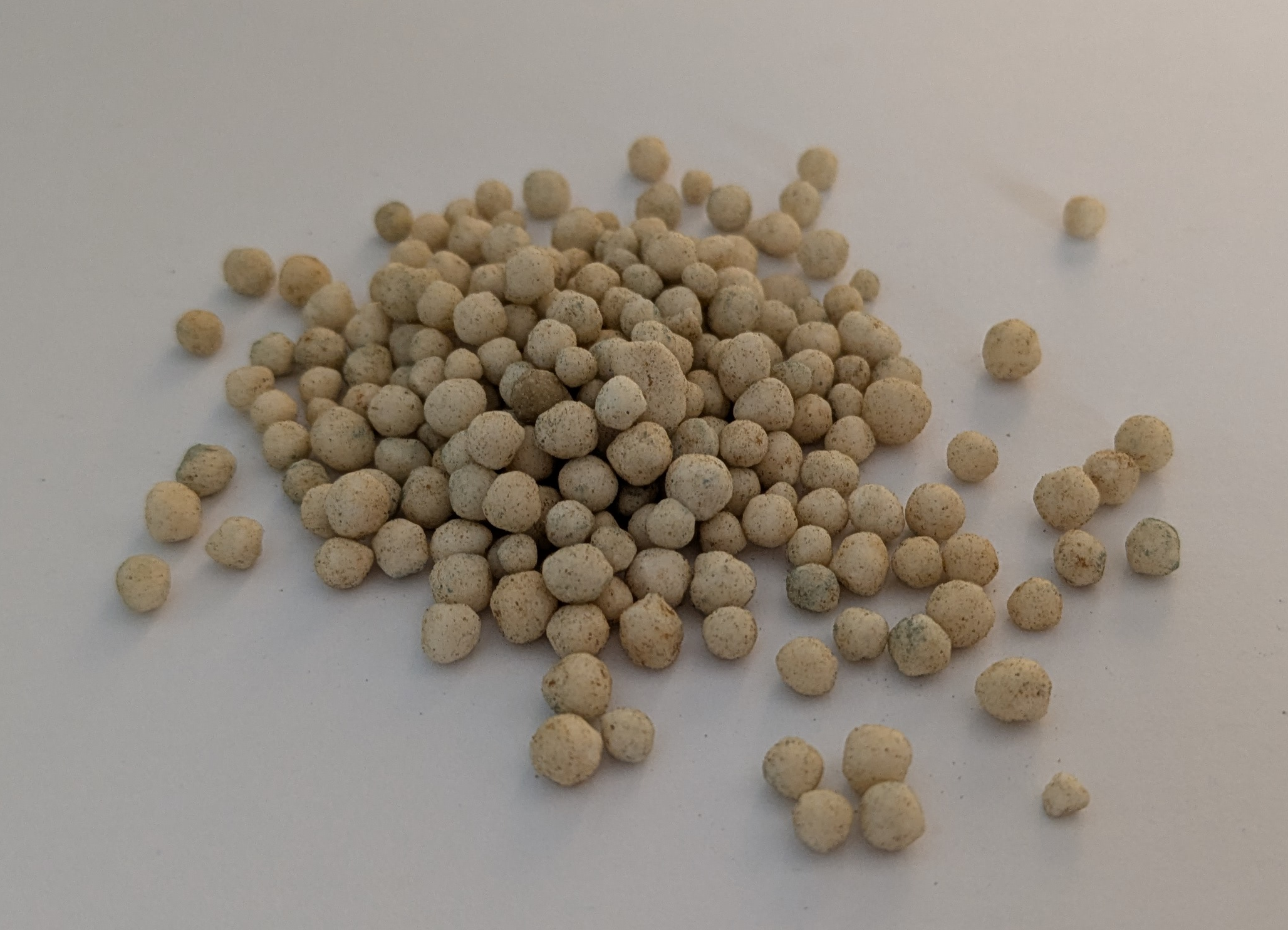
- Pellets of calcium ammonium nitrate fertilizer

Names
- Other names CAN

Identifiers
CAS Number	15245-12-2
3D model (JSmol)	Interactive image
ChEBI	CHEBI:91238
ChemSpider	146035
ECHA InfoCard	100.035.702
EC Number	239-289-5
PubChem CID	92043295
CompTox Dashboard (EPA)	DTXSID00892169
- InChI: InChI=1S/Ca.HNO3.2NO3.H3N/c;3*2-1(3)4;/h;(H,2,3,4);;;1H3/q+2;;2*-1; Key: QGPZBKDRJAXSRG-UHFFFAOYSA-N
- SMILES: N.[N+](=O)(O)[O-].[N+](=O)([O-])[O-].[N+](=O)([O-])[O-].[Ca+2]

Properties
Chemical formula	Variable
Appearance	White to Yellow crystals with similar shape to that of Ammonium nitrate

Related compounds
Related compounds	Ammonium nitrate Calcium nitrate
- Except where otherwise noted, data are given for materials in their standard state (at 25 °C [77 °F], 100 kPa). Infobox references

Calcium ammonium nitrate or CAN, also known as nitro-limestone or nitrochalk, is a widely used inorganic fertilizer, accounting for 4% of all nitrogen fertilizer used worldwide in 2007.

== Production ==
The term "calcium ammonium nitrate" is applied to multiple different, but closely related formulations. One variety of calcium ammonium nitrate is made by adding powdered limestone to ammonium nitrate; another, fully water-soluble version, is a mixture of calcium nitrate and ammonium nitrate, which crystallizes as a hydrated double salt: Ca_{5}NH_{4}(NO_{3})_{11}·10H_{2}O. Unlike ammonium nitrate, these calcium containing formulations are not classified as oxidizers by the United States Department of Transportation.

Consumption of CAN was 3.54 million tonnes in 1973/74, 4.45 million tonnes in 1983/84, 3.58 million tonnes in 1993/94. Production of calcium ammonium nitrate consumed 3% of world ammonia production in 2003. ·

== Physical and chemical properties ==
Calcium ammonium nitrate is hygroscopic. Its dissolution in water is endothermic, leading to its use in some instant cold packs.

== Use ==
Most calcium ammonium nitrate is used as a fertilizer. Fertilizer grade CAN contains roughly 8% calcium and 21-27% nitrogen. CAN is preferred for use on acid soils, as it acidifies soil less than many common nitrogen fertilizers. It is also used in place of ammonium nitrate where ammonium nitrate is banned.

Calcium ammonium nitrate is used in some instant cold packs as an alternative to ammonium nitrate.

Calcium ammonium nitrate has seen use in improvised explosives. The CAN is not used directly, but is instead first converted to ammonium nitrate; "More than 85% of the IEDs used against U.S. forces in Afghanistan contain homemade explosives, and of those, about 70% are made with ammonium nitrate derived from calcium ammonium nitrate". CAN and other fertilizers were banned in the Malakand Division and in Afghanistan following reports of its use by militants to make explosives. Due to these bans, "Potassium chlorate — the stuff that makes matches catch fire — has surpassed fertilizer as the explosive of choice for insurgents."
