= Element collecting =

Hobby of collecting samples of the chemical elements

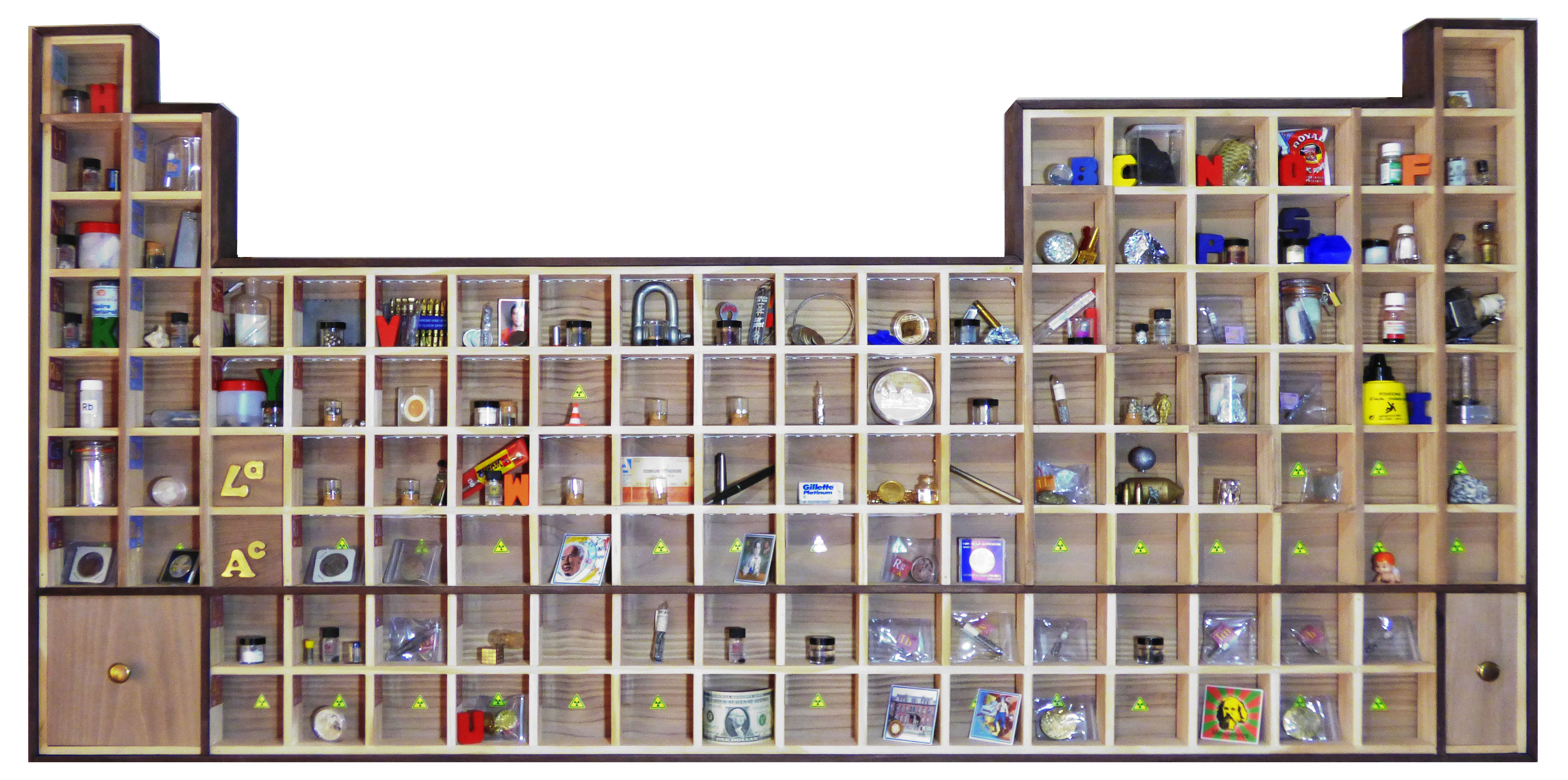
A set of periodic-table elements, lacking several highly radioactive elements which are impractical or impossible to collect.

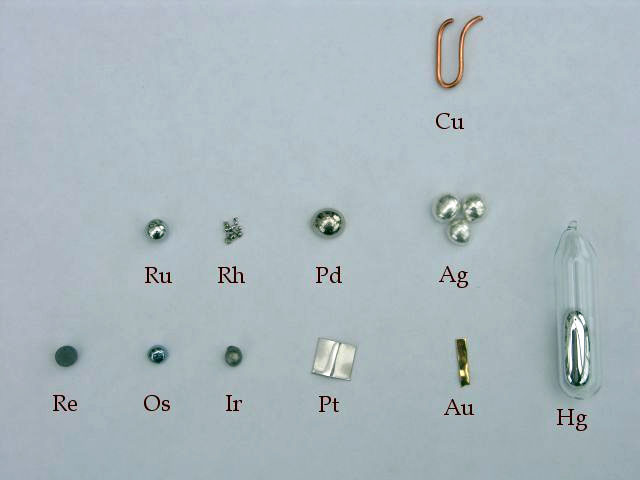
An assortment of precious metals

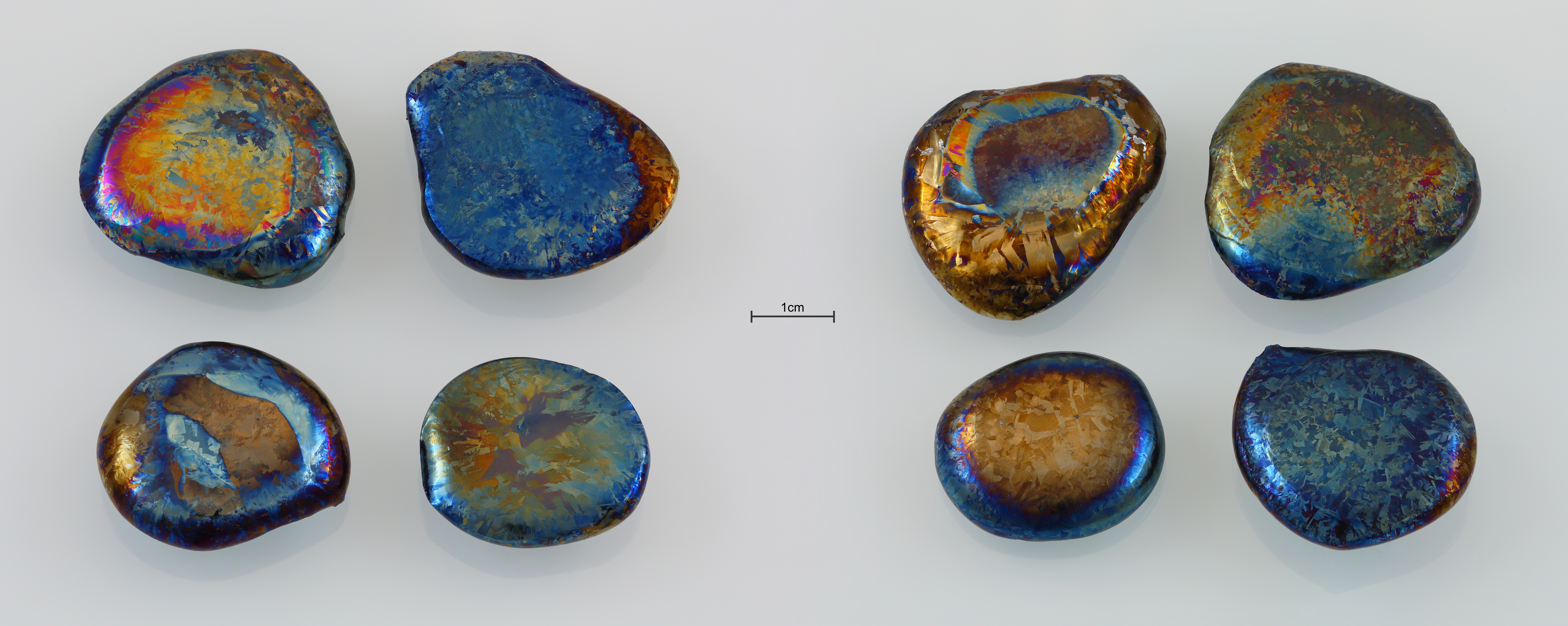
Hafnium samples for collectors

Element collecting is the hobby of collecting the chemical elements. Many element collectors simply enjoy finding peculiar uses of chemical elements. Others enjoy studying the properties of the elements, possibly engaging in amateur chemistry, and some simply collect elements for no practical reason. Some element collectors invest in elements, while some amateur chemists have amassed a large collection of elements—Oliver Sacks, for example. In recent years, the hobby has gained popularity with media attention brought by element collectors like Theodore Gray. Sagar Jamane describes element collecting as “more a discipline than a hobby.” “It’s a reminder of the enormous effort of all the beautiful minds behind the periodic table and element discovery,” he says, adding that it's thrilling to see the elements that make up the universe at such close quarters.

== Acquiring elements ==
Some collectors attempt to collect very high purity samples of each element. Others prefer to find the element in everyday use. Some are averse to collecting the element as a compound or alloy, while others find this acceptable. Collectors may isolate elements in their own homes. Hydrogen, for example, can be easily isolated via the electrolysis of water.

In addition to the element samples, some element collectors also collect items connected with the element, such as manufactured goods containing the element, rocks and minerals with the element as a constituent or compounds of the element. Some manufacturers also sell coins made from pure elements, and density cubes made from the pure element can also be sourced on auction sites such as eBay.

Some commercial retailers now cater to the element collecting community, even selling large quantities in sets, since purchasing elements from large chemical companies is frequently prohibited or uneconomical for individuals. There are a number of specialist element providers which retail to the public over the web, selling individual element samples in addition to full and partial element sets. Many also sell elements through auction sites, such as eBay. Established specialist providers include RGB Elements, Engineered Labs, Nova Elements, Smart Elements, SMT Metalle Wimmer, PEGUYS, Metallium, Luciteria, and Onyxmet.

== Practical issues ==
Collecting macroscopic samples of all the elements is problematic: some elements, such as mercury, beryllium, thallium, plutonium, and arsenic are toxic and so are difficult to find or their sale is restricted. Others are rare in commerce, and thus hard to buy or expensive: scandium, lutetium, and thulium. Some, such as caesium, white phosphorus, and fluorine, are too reactive and have restrictions on their shipping; others, such as gallium, react corrosively and very fast with aluminium, so cannot be shipped by air. Some, such as phosphorus and iodine, are controlled due to use in clandestine chemistry. Others, like radon and astatine, are radioactive and have half-lives too short for practical collection in addition to their radioactive hazards. Usually only the stable elements from hydrogen to bismuth (except the radioactive technetium and promethium) are collected, with the exceptions of the extremely long-lived thorium and uranium. It is possible to source other radioactive elements, such as radium (usually in the form of radium sulfate as part of luminescent paint on antique watch hands), americium (in the form of radioactive buttons containing 0.29 micrograms of americium extracted from older smoke detectors), promethium (often in the form of luminous paint), polonium from devices meant to eliminate static electricity, and technetium with a half-life of 211,100 years plated on foil. In August 2023, an Australian collector, named Emmanuel Lidden, was arrested because he bought a sample of uranium and plutonium for his element collection. In April 2025, an American collector, named Jacob D. Miller, was arrested because he bought a sample of plutonium from Russia for his element collection, facing decades in prison.

In What If?, Randall Munroe humorously explored the practicalities of building a periodic table consisting of bricks of each of the elements. He points out that many of the elements would immediately react with the air or with each other, sometimes with dramatic results. Astatine is so radioactive that it would quickly be "vaporized by its own heat". He concludes:

While collecting things is certainly fun, when it comes to chemical elements, you do not want to collect them all.

== Notable collectors ==
Several collectors have gained notoriety for their large element collections in addition to their other accomplishments, including:

- Theodore Gray, scientist, author, and co-founder of Wolfram Research;
- Oliver Sacks, British neurologist and writer; and
- James and Jenny Marshall, creators of the film Rediscovery of the Elements.

== See also ==
- Periodic table
- Prices of chemical elements
