= Emile Leray =

French electrician (born 1949)

- Born: 23 August 1949 (age 77); France
- Known for: Building a motorcycle in the Moroccan Desert

Emile Leray (born 23 August 1949) is a French electrician who is most noteworthy for transforming a car into a motorcycle while stranded in the Sahara desert in 1993.

== Achievements ==
Leray built a desert motorcycle out of the parts of a broken-down Citroën 2CV in 1993, while on a solo trip in Morocco. His car broke down near the coastal town of Tantan, Morocco, when he accidentally hit a rock, which damaged his car's chassis. Per Leray's account, he was stranded about 32 kilometres (20 miles) from Tantan, with only enough food and water to last ten days. To survive, Leray used the shell of the 2CV as a shelter and built a motorcycle from the engine chassis. Twelve days after the accident, he was able to drive it to Tantan. His converted 2CV and Moroccan traffic ticket (for having an automobile license plate on a motorcycle) are on display at the Midwest Dream Car Collection in Manhattan, Kansas. An unsuccessful attempt to replicate the motorcycle was made on a 2015 episode of MythBusters, where Adam and Jamie concluded that the vehicle was unstable and hard to control.
