= MythBusters (2013 season) =

- No. of episodes: 11 (includes 1 special)

Release
- Original network: Discovery Channel
- Original release: May 1 – October 17, 2013

Season chronology
- ← Previous; 2012 season Next → 2014 season

The cast of the television series MythBusters perform experiments to verify or debunk urban legends, old wives' tales, and the like. This is a list of the various myths tested on the show as well as the results of the experiments (the myth is Busted, Plausible, or Confirmed). The 2013 season premiered on May 1, 2013, returning to its Wednesday time slot.

== Episode overview ==
No. overall	No. in season	Title	Original release date	Overall episode No.
197	1	"JATO Rocket Car: Mission Accomplished?"	May 1, 2013	218
Myths tested: Can a 1967 Chevy take off with JATO rockets, like in the tale of the JATO Rocket Car? (Revisit of: JATO Car); Note: This was the first of two "10th Anniversary" episodes
198	2	"Deadliest Catch Crabtastic Special"	May 8, 2013	219
Myths tested: Will a crab pot drag you overboard to the bottom if your foot is caught in a coil? Is it better to work a 30-hour grind with no sleep than a 20 minute nap every 6 hours? Are crab pots truly indestructible? Note: Deadliest Catch captains Johnathan Hillstrand and Scott "Junior" Campbell guest star in this episode.
199	3	"Down and Dirty/Earthquake Survival"	May 15, 2013	220
Myths tested: Is a bathroom's hand dryer better than a paper towel? Which public restroom stall is the cleanest? Is better to stand in the doorway during an earthquake?
200	4	"Indy Car Special"	May 22, 2013	221
Myths tested: Can man beat machine in a 30-ft, standing-start sprint? Can a driver lose 10 lbs during a race? Can the suction created by a speeding car rip loose a manhole cover during a street race?
201	5	"Battle of the Sexes: Round 2"	May 29, 2013	222
Myths tested: Will lost men really not stop and ask for directions? Are women better multi-taskers? Are women better at parallel parking? Are men better at throwing objects than women?
202	6	"Motorcycle Water Ski"	June 5, 2013 (US); May 6, 2013 (AUS)	223
Myths tested: Can a motorcycle traveling at highway speeds drive across the surface of a lake? Can you survive a jump from a high-rise building with a parachute made from a hotel room's contents?
203	7	"Hypermiling/Crash Cushions"	June 12, 2013 (US); May 27, 2013 (AUS)	224
Myths tested: Could a man sandwiched between two big men in the backseat of a car survive the car being T-boned by a truck, as seen in Headhunters? Can hypermiling techniques really double your car's fuel efficiency?
204	8	"Duct Tape Canyon"	June 19, 2013	225
Myths tested: Can Adam and Jamie cross a canyon and reach civilization using only basic supplies, duct tape, and bubble wrap? Note: This is a special episode. It was used to promote Skywire Live.
205	9	"Painting With Explosives/Bifurcated Boat"	June 26, 2013	226
Myths tested: Can a room be painted using explosives via Adam's snowflake frame or Jamie's steel sphere? Can a boat be split in two by a channel marker? (Revisit of: Bifurcated Boat); Note: This was the second of two "10th Anniversary" episodes.
206	10	"Breaking Bad Special"	August 12, 2013 (US); July 15, 2013 (AUS)	227
Myths tested: Can concentrated hydrofluoric acid in a bathtub completely dissolve a human body, create a hole through the tub, and dissolve the bathroom floor below it? Can a chunk of solid mercury fulminate thrown on the ground explode, kill or injure bystanders, and break nearby windows, all without injuring the thrower? Note: Breaking Bad creator Vince Gilligan and actor Aaron Paul make a guest appearance.
207	11	"Zombie Special"	October 17, 2013	228
Myths tested: Is an axe more effective than a gun when you are swarmed by zombies? Can the force of many people bust down a door? Can you escape from a horde of zombies? Note: The Walking Dead's Michael Rooker guest stars in this episode.

== Episode 197 – "JATO Rocket Car: Mission Accomplished?" ==
- Original air date: May 1, 2013

This was the first of two "10th Anniversary" episodes.

=== JATO 3: Mission Accomplished? ===
Myth	Status	Notes
A car with a JATO rocket attached can speed up to 300 miles per hour (480 km/h), become airborne, and impact with the side of a cliff. A revisit of the "Jet Assisted Chevy" myth from the first pilot episode.	Re-Busted	For this experiment, Adam and Jamie planned the particulars for two launches, while the Build Team modified a large dump truck with a protective metal cage around the exterior of the cab for use as a mobile command bunker (later dubbed "the Beast"). The first test involved a Chevrolet Impala with five rockets attached, fired as it approached a line of 50-pound (23 kg) sandbags. The car crossed the sandbags at over 200 miles per hour (320 km/h), but only managed to get airborne by flipping and tumbling when Adam lost control of it. There was no indication that the sandbags had contributed to the car leaving the ground. The second test involved a second Impala with six rockets attached, launched off a giant ramp as in the Supersized Myths special. This time, the car hit the ramp perfectly straight and was launched into the air, but it immediately began tumbling and landed about 600 feet (180 m) away. The team came to the conclusion that the myth scenario is impossible simply because cars are not shaped like rockets and are therefore not aerodynamic in a way that supports flight.

== Episode 198 – "Deadliest Catch Crabtastic Special" ==
- Original air date: May 8, 2013

This episode aired out of order on Discovery Channel in the United States, as the small-scale test for "Killer Loop" briefly referenced the small-scale test for "Crash Cushion". For all three myths, Adam, Jamie, Tory, Kari and Grant were joined by two Deadliest Catch captains - F/V Time Bandit captain Johnathan Hillstrand and Seabrooke captain Scott Campbell Jr.

=== Killer Loop ===
Myth	Status	Notes
A fisherman can be pulled to the bottom of the ocean if he is caught in a coiled rope attached to a sinking crab pot.	Plausible	A scale model test showed that over-under coiling was more effective in pulling someone overboard than regular coiling, but regular coiling was used for the full-scale test as it is a more common technique to be used on a crab boat. All tests in which Buster was standing up or leaning on the pot launcher failed to work; Buster would get caught on the pot launcher. However, a final test with Buster leaning over the rail finally resulted in him going overboard. When Buster was recovered, his depth gauge read 100 feet (30 m), and he was still attached to the rope in the same place it caught him. Jamie and Adam declared the myth plausible since getting caught in the coil does not guarantee that the person will go overboard, but remarked that if one were to go overboard they would, in fact, be pulled all the way to the bottom.

=== Crab Napping ===
Inspired by Bering Sea crab boat shifts lasting as long as 30 hours, which leads to some captains swearing by this myth.

Myth	Status	Notes
Working a 30-hour shift with a 20-minute nap every six hours results in double the performance of not getting any sleep.	Confirmed	Kari and Tory went onto an anchored ship and set up an obstacle course featuring tasks that a Bering Sea crab boat deckhand could expect to face, including throwing a hook, sorting crab, dodging mock versions of crab pots, answering navigation questions, and a steady hand test with a total 100 possible points. Kari and Tory both got perfect scores for their (fully rested) control and then ran two tests after 30 hours awake, with the difference being that the second included the 20-minute crab naps. Without the crab naps, Kari scored 27 and Tory scored 34, but after adding in the naps, Kari and Tory successfully doubled their scores in the re-test (and then some) with scores of 64 and 81.

=== Indestructible Pot ===
Myth	Status	Notes
Crab pots are indestructible.	Busted	After the Build Team declared that any damage to the steel frame would have constituted some destruction, the first test with 3 lb (1 kg) of C4 suspended inside the pot failed to damage the steel. However, a second test with the same amount of C4 strategically placed below the pot in direct contact with the frame damaged the steel in multiple places. As a result, Johnathan and Scott treated the Build Team to dinner.

== Episode 199 – "Down and Dirty/Earthquake Survival" ==
- Original air date: May 15, 2013

=== Down and Dirty ===
Myth	Status	Notes
Hand dryers in public restrooms are a less effective method of removing bacteria from one's hands after washing than paper towels, and spread more bacteria around the drying area.	Confirmed	First, to find out if washing hands even leaves behind any bacteria to be removed by hand dryers, Adam and Jamie tested three different, commonly used methods of "washing" hands, each followed by swabbing and incubating in Petri dishes: rubbing hands together without placing them under the water; getting hands wet but neglecting to use any soap; and washing hands with soap and water, which is the proper method. They discovered that washing their hands with soap and water yielded no bacteria whatsoever, whereas washing without soap left a fairly substantial amount of bacteria and attempting to wash without water left far too much to count. Next, they enlisted 16 volunteers to have their hands sprayed with a harmless strain of Escherichia coli bacteria, then swabbed for a sample, then washed using water but no soap, then swabbed again, then dried using paper towels, then swabbed a third time. Then they repeated the process with the same volunteers, bacteria and washing technique, but using hand dryers instead. On average, the paper towels removed 71% of the bacteria on the volunteers' hands, while the hand dryers only removed 23%, confirming the first part of the myth. Samples taken from swabbing the testing areas yielded 3 for the paper towels and 41 for the hand dryers, confirming the second part.

=== Stall Number 1 ===
Myth	Status	Notes
In a public restroom, the bathroom stall closest to the entrance is used the least often and contains the least amount of bacteria.	Confirmed	After 119 different men used a restroom with four bathroom stalls that had been freshly cleansed of all bacteria, Adam and Jamie swabbed each of the stalls and counted the number of colonies of bacteria produced. The stalls, numbered in order from the closest to the entrance (as 1) to the farthest (as 4), had 162, 267, 290 and 231 colonies, respectively. In addition, a tally of the users of each stall showed that the stalls were used by 23, 38, 34 and 24 people, respectively.

=== Earthquake Emergency ===
Myth	Status	Notes
Standing in a doorway yields the best chance of survival when an earthquake hits.	Busted	The Build Team built a 13 by 11 feet (4.0 m × 3.4 m) earthquake shaking table using pneumatic valve springs and air casters, then had a small masonry house built on top of it. They placed mannequins in three different locations inside the house: one standing in the room, one lying under a table, and one standing in the doorway. When they started up the shake table, the masonry house began to collapse fairly quickly, except for the doorframe. The mannequins standing in the room and lying under the table suffered, but the one in the doorway was subject only to being battered by the swinging door. Then they retested with a new house with a wooden frame, and the mannequin standing inside was soon dispatched, but the doorway and table mannequins remained intact. After a final shake with enough force to simulate a magnitude 9.5 earthquake, the doorway mannequin fell over, leaving the under-the-table mannequin the last one to survive. Despite the doorway testing as the best spot in the masonry house, the Build Team declared the myth busted due to the high rarity of such houses in current times.

== Episode 200 – "Indy Car Special" ==
- Original air date: May 22, 2013

=== Man vs. Car ===
Myth	Status	Notes
In a 30-foot (9.1 m) race, a human can outrun a race car.	Busted	At the Indianapolis Motor Speedway in Speedway, Indiana, Jamie and Adam each took turns driving the race car, while the other tried to outrun it. Each tried three times, and Adam had one dead heat with the race car, but they both ultimately failed to beat it. They then enlisted Olympic runner Wallace Spearmon to race against IndyCar Series driver Ryan Briscoe, with the latter winning by a comfortable margin every time.

=== Manhole Mishap ===
Myth	Status	Notes
During an IndyCar Series road race, race cars can generate enough suction against the ground while driving to remove manhole covers from their manholes.	Busted	Adam and Jamie installed a mock manhole cover inside a mock manhole that was dug by the owners of the Indianapolis Motor Speedway, adding weights to the bottom because the cover itself weighed less than a real one. They attached high-strength line to the cover so it could only move half an inch. Finally, IndyCar Series racer Logan Gomez drove over the manhole cover at 100 and 150 miles per hour (240 km/h), but failed to impart enough force to move it. After removing the weights for a final test, the car imparted 37 pounds-force (160 N) on the manhole cover, which was just barely enough to move it at all, and would certainly not be enough to move a real manhole cover.

=== Sweaty Speed ===
Myth	Status	Notes
During an IndyCar Series race, a driver can lose 10 pounds (4.5 kg).	Plausible	As a control test, the Build Team spent three hours, the length of an Indianapolis 500 race, in a dry sauna. Grant and Kari lost 1 pound (0.45 kg) each, while Tory lost 2 pounds (0.91 kg). Next, Tory spent three hours driving a race car around the Indianapolis Motor Speedway, but only lost 3 pounds (1.4 kg). As a final test, the Build Team drove laps for three hours around Thunderhill Raceway Park. Kari lost 5.5 pounds (2.5 kg), Tory lost 5 pounds (2.3 kg), and Grant lost 4.5 pounds (2.0 kg). Although it was not the amount required by the myth, they deemed it plausible due to the much more extreme circumstances in a longer and faster race such as the Indianapolis 500.

== Episode 201 – "Battle of the Sexes: Round 2" ==
- Original air date: May 29, 2013

=== Man Throw ===
Myth	Status	Notes
Men are better at throwing objects than women. Based on the insult of "throwing like a girl" towards a grown male (i.e. throwing with less power than needed).	Busted	Adam and Jamie selected a female and a male from each of four age groups: 7-, 12-, 18- and 24-year-olds. In the first test, which involved throwing tennis balls at a target, the females threw more accurately than the males, but not as fast. They repeated the test with the 7- and 24-year-olds in a motion capture studio at Industrial Light & Magic in order to analyze the subjects' body movements while throwing, and noted that the females tended to throw while keeping their bodies upright, while the males leaned forward, more closely resembling the movement of professional baseball pitcher Greg Reynolds. In the final test, which had the subjects use their non-preferred hands to make throws, the males threw more accurately but not as fast, a reversal of the first test. Additionally, all subjects showed the same form when using their non-preferred hands, regardless of gender. Finally, Adam and Jamie enlisted softball pitcher Jordan Taylor for the test, and found that her form was identical to that of Greg Reynolds. The MythBusters declared the myth busted on the basis that throwing objects is a skill that can be learned with equal effectiveness by both genders, and that any perceived difference is due to cultural bias that exposes males to more ball sports.

=== Multi-Tasking Talent ===
Myth	Status	Notes
Women are better at multitasking than men.	Confirmed	The Build Team devised a "morning routine" test where the subjects had to get dressed, iron clothes, make tea, toast and a sandwich within five minutes while answering three trivia questions over a cell phone and ensuring that a robotic baby Buster did not crawl outside of a marked zone within the stage area. Each test subject began with a base score of 100, with deductions of 10 points apiece for failed or incomplete tasks. Ten women achieved an average score of 72, while ten men averaged 64. Additionally, the only perfect score of the test was scored by a woman.

=== Ask for Directions ===
Myth	Status	Notes
Men do not ask for directions as often as women when they get lost.	Busted	Adam and Jamie set up a test where the subject was instructed to follow a set of directions that included one intentional misdirection in the area of an intersection surrounded by volunteers that the subjects could ask for directions. Ten men and ten women took the test, with nine people from each gender asking for directions. The tie was resolved by the fact that the men spent an average of 4:11 driving before asking for directions, while the women spent an average of 5:11 before doing the same, busting the myth.

=== Parking Power ===
Myth	Status	Notes
Women are better at parallel parking than men.	Busted	Kari and Tory judged as ten men and ten women took turns parallel parking. Scoring was based on a starting score of 100, with deductions for not centering the car properly, bumping into the cars in front of and behind the parking car, and any corrections or reattempts. The men had scores that were consistently average and mediocre, while the women fluctuated wildly between great and terrible scores. Ultimately, the men scored a 43.6 average, and the women scored a 42.5 average, too close to discern a statistical difference.

=== Observation Skills ===
This segment was cut from the episode when it aired in the United States.

Myth	Status	Notes
Women are better at observation than men.	Plausible	In a replication of the Simons-Chabris invisible gorilla test designed to measure general inattentional blindness, ten men and ten women were shown a video of two three-man teams passing basketballs and were told to count the number of times a white team member passed a basketball, while the true aim was to see if the subjects could spot a zombie (Kari in a costume) walking amongst the action. Only one man and two women were able to do so successfully, leading the Build Team to call the myth plausible due to the marginal results.

== Episode 202 – "Motorcycle Water Ski" ==
- Original US air date: June 5, 2013
- Original Australia air date: May 6, 2013

=== Motorcycle Mayhem ===
Myth	Status	Notes
A motorcycle moving at freeway speed can ride across the surface of a lake, as demonstrated in a YouTube viral video.	Confirmed (but not recommended)	Adam and Jamie set up a small-scale test using a remote-controlled toy motorcycle and a fabricated small pond of scaled depth, but in all their test runs, the high-speed camera showed the RC motorcycle riding mostly along the bottom of the pond. They next attempted to see if a motorcycle could actually achieve buoyancy on water; to do this, they built a rig to attach a motorcycle wheel to the side of a speedboat, and despite some initial difficulties getting the boat up to speed (solved by having Jamie counterbalance the added weight on the rear of the boat by lying on the bow), were eventually able to get the tire to skim on the surface at 60 miles per hour (97 km/h). They then enlisted AMA supercross veteran Eric McCrummen for a full-scale test; McCrummen successfully rode his motorcycle across 50 ft (15 m) and then 100 ft (30 m) of open water with a depth of 3 feet (0.91 m), confirming the myth. Finally, Jamie attempted to ride across a very long stretch of open water to determine if the motorcycle was merely skipping across the surface on existing momentum or was in fact able to generate power while on top of the water; he sank after riding about 300 feet (91 m).

=== Homemade Parachute ===
Myth	Status	Notes
A criminal holed up in a hotel room could have jumped to safety from 20 stories without injury using a parachute constructed in 3 hours from materials in the room.	Busted	The Build Team decided to attempt building their own parachutes individually, with each having access to the same materials as the criminal would have had and a 3-hour time limit. Despite each successfully constructing a differently shaped parachute out of different materials within the time limit, none of the parachutes were able to slow Buster's descent (when dropped from a 20-story height by a crane) enough to prevent him from sustaining a lethal g-force in excess of 100 g, with Grant's design faring the best at 144 g. The team followed up by testing various materials common to hotel rooms against actual parachute material by weight and air resistance, using the results along with mathematical calculations to construct a "best case" parachute out of shower curtains. While Buster survived a drop from 30 stories with this final parachute with no injuries (sustaining a g-force of only 4.2 g), the team declared the myth busted because the final parachute required far more material (a whole floor of rooms's worth of shower curtains, as opposed to a single room) and more time to construct than the criminal would have had available to him, as well as involving significant design challenges.

== Episode 203 – "Hypermiling/Crash Cushions" ==
- Original US air date: June 12, 2013
- Original Australia air date: May 27, 2013

=== Crash Cushion ===
Myth	Status	Notes
A person seated between overweight policemen in the backseat of a car can survive the impact of a T-bone collision from a truck driving at highway speed. Based on a scene in the film Headhunters.	Busted	For the small-scale test, Adam built a scale model of the car from the movie out of polycarbonate, and small leather pouches filled with a water balloon to simulate the overweight policemen. When hit from the side with a large tree stump, a mini-Buster seated alone in the backseat of the model car sustained a lethal g-force of 150 g, but a survivable 30 g when placed between the two simulated policemen, giving the myth plausibility. For the full-scale experiment, Adam and Jamie modified the Beast (previously seen in the final JATO Rocket Car revisit) with a large steel plate welded in front. When they used the Beast to T-bone the actual car from the movie at 50 miles per hour (80 km/h), the MythBusters (to their shock) achieved the opposite result: A simulated cadaver placed between two 350 lb (159 kg) simulated policemen (crafted by Adam and Jamie out of foam and rubber, then filled with water) in the backseat sustained more lethal injuries (including a full decapitation) and maxed out g-force sensors at over 800 g, as compared with a control test with the simulated cadaver alone in the backseat (where the damage and g-force numbers at 500–600 g, while still very much lethal, were noticeably better). Jamie speculated the reason for this may be the human body largely being made up of water and water's lack of compressibility, thus making the human body ineffective as a cushion.

=== Hypermiling ===
Myth	Status	Notes
You can use various hypermiling techniques in concert with each other to double the fuel efficiency of your car.	Busted	The Build Team began by individually testing the (legal) hypermiling techniques that the show had yet to examine – driving at a slower speed on the highway, accelerating and braking in as slow and smooth a fashion as possible, and turning off the engine when idling at a red light. All of the individual tests showed an increase in fuel efficiency of about 30% for the hypermiling technique compared with standard technique. They then proceeded to perform tests on two different vehicles (Kari and Grant in a new vehicle, Tory in an older vehicle with 75,000 miles (121,000 km) on the engine) comparing standard driving with a combination of all hypermiling techniques, with each car getting 3-US-gallon (11 L) of gas for both the control and hypermiling test. Kari and Grant's car traveled 64 miles (103 km) for the control and 90 miles (140 km) for the hypermiling test (a 40% gain), compared with Tory's figures of 78 miles (126 km) and 136 miles (219 km) respectively (a 70% gain). Despite declaring the myth busted, the Build Team noted the effectiveness of hypermiling techniques in improving the fuel efficiency of a car.

== Episode 204 – "Duct Tape Canyon" ==
- Original air date: June 19, 2013

The Build Team does not appear in this episode.

=== Duct Tape Canyon Special ===
In this spiritual successor to Duct Tape Island, Adam and Jamie are stranded in a barren wasteland near Desolation Canyon, Utah, with only duct tape, bubble wrap and a few other basic staples (e.g. food, water and a knife), and must depend on these limited resources to cross the canyon and reach civilization. Features a cameo appearance by Nik Wallenda to promote the Discovery Channel special Skywire Live, which aired the weekend following the original airing of this episode.

Adam and Jamie's goals were to...

Myth	Status	Notes
...find the canyon.	Confirmed	To survive the temperature (which was around 0 °C (32 °F) at the time), Adam and Jamie wrapped themselves in ponchos made from bubble wrap and held together with duct tape. They then found a nearby mesa from which to survey the turf and locate the canyon.
...make shelter and a fire.	Confirmed	Jamie used duct tape to forge a low-hanging tent to sleep in while lying on a mattress of bubble pack, while Adam slept in the car they used to get stranded. Adam was also able to use sparks from the car's battery to make a fire, after making duct tape handles for the battery's wires which tended to get hot.
...carry their supplies across the desert.	Confirmed	Jamie used large branches and duct tape to construct a travois to haul most of the supplies, while Adam made a bag and several yards of rope out of duct tape. Along the way to the canyon, they modified their shoes for further comfort while hiking by cutting out the toes and wrapping them in duct tape.
...descend safely into the canyon.	Confirmed	The MythBusters tied several of the ropes together and used them to slowly climb down one of the walls of the canyon, taking advantage of a few ledges and footholds along the way. They descended a total distance of 150 feet (46 m).
...paddle along rapids to the end of the canyon.	Partly Confirmed	Before building any boats to use, Adam was first wrapped in a thick suit of bubble wrap and duct tape, intending for it to be insulated and waterproof; however, cold water started to seep in after a short time and Adam soon lost his ability to control himself due to the added buoyancy of the bubble wrap. So to brave the rapids, they built two separate crafts out of bubble wrap pontoons held together by duct tape: Jamie made a large raft that resembled an inflatable pool sofa, and Adam constructed a long kayak. They each took their boats out onto the river and paddled downstream, where they repeatedly faced rapids of increasing difficulty, until they eventually reached a Class 5 rapid. Adam rode first, but his boat soon flipped and he fell out, forcing him to ride the rest of the rapids outside of the boat. He managed to survive, and found a large rock afterwards on which to rest and reenter the boat. Jamie handled the rapids by using the rocks to stand on as he carried his boat through narrow gaps, then rode the rest of the way without any problems. They discovered a waterfall soon after, and decided to bypass it on land instead of attempting to ride down. They used some more rope to climb down a 25 feet (7.6 m) cliff past the waterfall, after which they paddled their boats out of the canyon and headed for civilization.

== Episode 205 – "Painting With Explosives/Bifurcated Boat" ==
- Original air date: June 26, 2013

This was the second of two "10th Anniversary" episodes.

=== Painting with Explosives ===
Adam and Jamie decided to revisit the myth of Painting with Explosives, based on the episode "Do-It-Yourself Mr. Bean" of the British comedy series Mr. Bean starring Rowan Atkinson. They tested to find out if a small room could be painted with explosives using...

Myth	Status	Notes
...Adam's snowflake frame.	No result	After some preliminary tests at the bomb range attempting to use C4 to spread paint onto a canvas, Adam found the most effective method was using detasheet spread behind a bag of paint. He then built a large, six-directional frame and placed canvases on the six ends. When the explosive detonated, each of the canvases ended up almost entirely covered in paint. Though successful, it was not actually an attempt to paint a room, and thus it was not given a Busted, Plausible or Confirmed rating.
...Jamie's steel sphere.	Busted	Jamie's device in this episode Jamie first experimented with various nozzle shapes until he found one that created a large, rectangular spread of paint. He also conducted preliminary tests at the bomb range, using a scuba tank filled with explosives with the nozzle attached, but it failed to paint the wall in a better spread than a scuba tank without the nozzle. Jamie surmised that the energy from the explosive wasn't properly spraying the paint out through the nozzle in the intended fashion because the scuba tank was cylindrical, so he built a large, heavy-duty spherical tank (dubbed a Death Star by J.D. Nelson) out of specially cut steel circles with nozzles in four directions. He then placed his tank within a small room with four walls, with the nozzles facing the walls, and placed dynamite and paint inside the tank. When the dynamite went off, the paint sprayed to cover hardly any of the area of the walls.

=== Bifurcated Boat ===
Myth	Status	Notes
A boat moving at 25 miles per hour (40 km/h) can be split down the middle by hitting a channel marker. A revisit of the 2007 myth Bifurcated Boat.	Re-Busted	As per fan requests, the Build Team decided to test the myth on water, contrasting the previous tests on land. They also used a wooden channel marker instead of the metal one used in the previous tests. They planted their channel marker in a small part of the lake, then set up two boats to tow a third one (dubbed Mythity Split 2) into the channel marker. Before they could test, however, a barge suddenly appeared and knocked over their channel marker, creating a bad omen that the "curse of the bifurcated boat" was returning. Undaunted, the team planted a second channel marker and towed their boat into it at 25 mph, which ended up splitting the marker instead of the boat, re-busting the myth. To split the boat once and for all, they traveled to the New Mexico Institute of Mining and Technology to use their rocket sled. Instead of propelling the boat towards a channel marker (fearing that the boat would disintegrate), they placed a metal pole on the sled and propelled it using two rocket motors. It traveled toward the boat at 200 miles per hour (320 km/h) and finally split the boat in two.

== Episode 206 – "Breaking Bad Special" ==
- Original US air date: August 12, 2013
- Original Australia air date: July 15, 2013

This episode features myths drawn from the AMC drama series Breaking Bad, which had been teased since it was reported as early as the year before by Entertainment Weekly. Guesting in this episode are show creator/producer Vince Gilligan and co-starring actor Aaron Paul (Jesse Pinkman).

The episode had already been aired in several international markets (such as on SBSOne on July 15, 2013, and on Discovery Channel Southeast Asia on July 22, 2013) before making its US debut on August 12, 2013. The late US airing was timed to coincide with Breaking Bad's final season (second half) premiere the night before.

Myth	Status	Notes
Concentrated hydrofluoric acid in a bathtub can completely destroy a human body and eat a hole through the tub and the bathroom floor below it. From the season 1 episode "Cat's in the Bag...".	Busted	At UC-Berkeley, Adam and Jamie observed as 100-mL portions of the acid were poured onto samples of seven materials that would have been present in the bathroom: steel, wood, linoleum, drywall, ceramic-coated cast iron, ceramic alone, and pig flesh (to represent the human body). After 8 hours of soaking, the materials had deteriorated to various degrees, but none had been completely destroyed. Adam noted that although fluorine is the most reactive of the halogens, it forms the weakest acid of the group when it combines with hydrogen. Jamie brought in a load of concentrated sulfuric acid, along with a second chemical that he referred to as "special sauce" to increase its corrosive ability. He and Adam built a bathroom set at a sanitary landfill, with a catch tank to contain any spills, and filled its cast-iron tub with 35 pounds (16 kg) of pig carcass parts and 6 US gallons (23 L) of the acid/"sauce" mixture. This liquid volume was three times the amount used in the actual scene. The tub contents eventually began to bubble, smoke, and give off large amounts of heat; however, some solid material remained after 20 minutes and neither the tub nor the floor leaked. Acting on suggestions from Vince and Aaron, Adam and Jamie decided to use a larger quantity of acid/"sauce" (36 US gallons (140 L)) and a tub made from a more susceptible material. Fiberglass degraded quickly when exposed to the acid, so the two set up a full-scale test using it for their tub. Once the mixture was added, the reaction was so vigorous that the entire set was briefly hidden under thick clouds of smoke. After 5 minutes, Adam and Jamie found only a black organic sludge in the tub; although large amounts of liquid had boiled over the side, neither the tub nor the floor had been eaten through. Since they were unable to replicate the scene, they declared the myth busted. Although the "sauce" was never explicitly identified, Jamie mentioned that the "sauce" had a lot of hydrogen and oxygen, and Adam said the concentration was 30%. Based on this description, the chemical being referred to was likely hydrogen peroxide, thus creating a solution commonly known as piranha solution (confirmed at Adam Savage's San Diego Comic Con 2015 panel). Jamie noted that what he and Adam saw in the aftermath in the tub matched in contents with what fell through the ceiling after the reaction in the episode.

=== Crazy Handful ===
Myth	Status	Notes
A chunk of solid mercury fulminate will explode if thrown on the ground, and the blast will kill/injure bystanders and break the windows without injuring the thrower. From the season 1 episode "Crazy Handful of Nothin'."	Busted	At a remote rock quarry, the Build Team enlisted the help of explosives consultant Jesse Taylor to make a batch of the compound, which is sensitive to mechanical shock. They started with a charge of 5 grams, placed inside a pumpkin and detonated with an explosive squib; the blast obliterated the pumpkin. Grant built a robot to throw the charge down with typical human force, while Kari and Tory built a room identical to the one used in the show scene. They placed mannequins at appropriate positions and set rupture discs next to each, calibrated to burst at 13 pounds per square inch (90 kPa) (injury) and 75 pounds per square inch (520 kPa) (death). A charge of 50 grams failed to explode when thrown down, but Vince imagined that Walter may have mixed a quantity of even more sensitive silver fulminate into the batch. The team fitted their 50-gram charge with a blasting cap to ensure it would explode, then set it off. The "injury" discs burst on this trial, but none of the windows blew out. In an attempt to replicate the explosion in the scene, Jesse made a 250-gram batch and the team set it off as in the second trial. This time, the resulting explosion broke the windows, burst every rupture disc, and blew the walls and ceiling apart. Because 5 times more explosive was required than used in the show, the team declared the myth busted.

As a postscript, in the 2015 episode "Blow It Out of the Water", Adam and Jamie – with Gilligan present – also tested the viability of Walter's jury-rigged car trunk machine gun trap in "Felina", the Breaking Bad series finale, and found it plausible.

== Episode 207 – "Zombie Special" ==
- Original air date: October 17, 2013

This special episode was timed to air in the US immediately following the Discovery Channel special Apocalypse Preppers and in the same week as the season 4 premiere of The Walking Dead. Features a special guest appearance by Michael Rooker, who portrayed Merle Dixon in seasons 1–3 of The Walking Dead.

=== Axe vs. Gun ===
Myth	Status	Notes
An axe is a more effective weapon against a horde of zombies than a gun.	Confirmed	In preparation for testing and to ensure the zombie volunteers' safety, Adam and Jamie fashioned plastic masks to protect the volunteers' faces from paintball gunshots, while Adam fashioned an axehead out of foam that would leave a paint mark when used to strike. Additionally, Michael Rooker coached the volunteers in the "zombie shuffle" form of movement that would be used consistently for all tests throughout the episode. For the test itself, Adam and Jamie marked off a "human zone" 30 feet (9.1 m) in diameter inside a hangar. On start, the zombies would approach the human zone, with Adam and Jamie forbidden from engaging a zombie until it entered the human zone. Adam (using the foam axe) averaged 14 kills across two runs, while Jamie (using a modified shotgun) only averaged 7 kills across two runs. Despite declaring the myth confirmed, Adam and Jamie would acknowledge practical limitations and issues with the parameters of the test in the episode's aftershow.

=== Dead Heat ===
Myth	Status	Notes
It is impossible to outrun or escape from a massively large zombie horde.	Busted	The Build Team set up a post-apocalyptic obstacle course on the Alameda runway in which 150 zombie volunteers would be dispersed over varying amounts of space to simulate various population densities. The volunteers were given a set of rules for their behavior gleaned from information Tory received in a consultation with The Walking Dead SFX artist Gregory Nicotero. The zombie threat was simulated by small brains attached to their clothes; allowing a zombie to grab one would be counted as failure. Kari successfully crossed a horde similar in density to the population of Manhattan, while Tory survived a horde the density of overpopulated areas of Mumbai. However, Grant, faced with the highest density known to mankind – 180,000 people per square mile – was unsuccessful in escaping the horde. The team then tried various techniques to see if they could divert the horde's attention away from them so as to successfully traverse this largest population density. Kari used Tory as a sacrifice and Grant used a robotic decoy; both tactics were successful. Tory opted to disguise himself as a zombie and blend in with the horde, but was recognized midway through his run and could not escape. Despite this, the team declared the myth busted since the horde could be escaped from through both speed and technique.

=== Power of the Push ===
Myth	Status	Notes
A zombie horde can collectively force their way through any barricaded door.	Busted	For this test, Adam and Jamie placed a steel frame inside the archway of a nineteenth-century barn as a place to install a series of double-doored gateways. The safety precautions for this test involved all zombie volunteers (and Adam, who participated in this test as one of the zombies) wearing cutouts of polyethylene sewer pipes, in order to prevent the volunteers from accidentally stumbling over and being trampled. On the first run, using rickety wood doors held in place by a single two-by-four, the doors gave way almost immediately when the zombie horde haphazardly pushed up against it. The second run, using doors of more robust wood with a single two-by-four, didn't fare much better, as it gave way with a single coordinated push by the horde. However, after Jamie and Michael reinforced the second set of doors with as much available wood as was on hand, the horde was unable to penetrate the doors on the third run, thus busting the myth.
