= MythBusters (2015 season) =

- No. of episodes: 14

Release
- Original network: Discovery Channel
- Original release: January 10 – September 5, 2015

Season chronology
- ← Previous; 2014 season Next → 2016 season

The cast of the television series MythBusters perform experiments to verify or debunk urban legends, old wives' tales, and the like. This is a list of the various myths tested on the show as well as the results of the experiments (the myth is either busted, plausible, or confirmed). The 2015 season premiered on January 10, 2015, in a Saturday time slot. The first half of the season ended on February 14, after six episodes had aired. The second half of the season resumed on July 18, still in the Saturday time slot. The final episode of the second half aired on September 5, with eight episodes having aired, and a total fourteen episodes having aired in the season.

This is the first season without Kari Byron, Tory Belleci, and Grant Imahara since they originally appeared in the show. Hyneman and Savage are now the only hosts of the show. The opening narration and blueprint title cards have been removed as of this season, and the episodes are punctuated by pop-up bubbles with information relevant to the myths being tested.

== Episode overview ==
No. overall	No. in season	Title	Original release date	Overall episode No.
223	1	"The Simpsons Special"	January 10, 2015	244
Myths tested: Will a cherry bomb dropped in a school toilet make others act like geysers? Will placing someone between a wrecking ball and a building protect the building? Note: The Simpsons executive producer Al Jean makes a guest appearance.
224	2	"Indiana Jones Special" "The Busters of the Lost Myths"	January 17, 2015	245
Myths tested: Could Indiana Jones have outrun a battery of wall-mounted dart launchers? Can you use a whip to disarm or neutralize an enemy with a gun? Does the tip of a whip break the sound barrier? Can you use a whip to swing safely across a chasm?
225	3	"A-Team Special"	January 24, 2015	246
Myths tested: Can you build a propane-powered log cannon to shoot planks at enemies? Can you safely disable a pursuing car by blasting a manhole cover upward into it?
226	4	"Video Game Special"	January 31, 2015	247
Myths tested: Can you easily carry and deploy a large variety of weapons, as in Doom? Can you easily slice through large amounts of thrown fruit, as in Fruit Ninja?
227	5	"Transformers"	February 7, 2015	248
Myths tested: Can a car be converted into a motorcycle? Can a bicycle be modified to operate on both land and water?
228	6	"San Francisco Drift"	February 14, 2015	249
Myths tested: Can you turn a corner faster by drifting than with conventional driving methods? Can you drift into a parallel parking space without hitting the adjacent cars or the curb?
229	7	"Blow It Out of the Water"	July 18, 2015	250
Myths tested: Can a boat be blown out of the water without destroying it? Is it possible to mount a remote-controlled machine gun in a car trunk and use it to kill a roomful of people from outside a house, as seen in the finale of Breaking Bad? Note: Breaking Bad creator Vince Gilligan makes a guest appearance.
230	8	"Flights of Fantasy"	July 25, 2015	251
Myths tested: Is the Lockheed U-2 really harder to fly and land safely than any other plane currently in use? Can a drone's propellers injure a person?
231	9	"Accidental Ammo"	August 1, 2015 (US); May 27, 2015 (FIN)	252
Myths tested: Can a stone shot from a lawn mower have the same force as a bullet shot from a .357 Magnum? Can a pane of glass falling cut a person fully in half?
232	10	"Dangerous Driving"	August 8, 2015	253
Myths tested: Is talking on the phone using hands-free technology when driving equally as distracting as holding the phone in the hand? Is it easy to drive a vehicle in reverse at high speed?
233	11	"Supernatural Shooters"	August 15, 2015 (US); May 10, 2015 (NLD & BEL)	254
Myths tested: Is it possible for a hitman to fire a bullet through a wall and hit a moving target on the other side? Can you effectively fire bullets from between your fingers by putting your hand in a fire, as seen in Shoot 'Em Up? Note: Actor Jonathan Banks of Breaking Bad was a special guest in this episode.
234	12	"Unfinished Business"	August 22, 2015	255
Myths tested: Can a video game that simulates a skill lead to real-world improvement in that skill? Are hollow road spikes more effective in stopping a car than solid ones? Is it difficult to hold on to a live grenade once the pin is pulled? Can you fire and reload a pistol as quickly as in a Hollywood action movie?
235	13	"MythBusters vs. Jaws"	August 29, 2015	256
Myths tested: Is there any way to shoot a scuba tank in a shark's mouth and cause it to explode? (Revisit of: Exploding Scuba Tank); Will the sound of orcas drive sharks away? Will the smell of a dead shark drive living ones away?
236	14	"Star Wars 2" "Star Wars - The Myths Strike Back"	September 5, 2015	257
Myths tested: Is it possible for people to dive out of the way of incoming Stormtrooper shots? Does a combatant on the higher ground have a significant advantage over his opposition? Note: This is a Star Wars themed episode.

== Episode 223 – "The Simpsons Special" ==
- Original air date: January 10, 2015

Adam and Jamie investigate two scenes from the animated series The Simpsons. Showrunner and executive producer Al Jean makes a guest appearance.

=== Homer Wrecker ===
Myth	Status	Notes
A person hanging on to a wrecking ball can protect a house from damage if the ball swings to pin him against the wall. Based on the episode "Sideshow Bob Roberts."	Plausible	Adam built a human analog for Homer Simpson with show-accurate dimensions, including a height of 5 feet 11 inches (180 cm). He used upholstery foam to build a hollow framework for the body and had a solid plastic mold fabricated for the head. After he and Jamie coated the mold with a layer of latex, they filled it with polyurethane foam to create the head. The body was painted with waterproof rubber and filled with water to match Homer's weight of 239 pounds (108 kg). Jamie built a wrecking ball by pouring concrete around two hemispherical steel frameworks set in holes dug into the ground, then letting the halves cure for several days before gluing them together. The finished ball measured 5 feet (150 cm) in diameter (Note: The on-screen graphics incorrectly state the diameter as 2.5 feet (76 cm). This is more accurately the radius (or half the diameter) of the ball, since it is apparent the stated diameter would be too short when the completed ball is seen standing next to the completed analog of Homer Simpson at 5 feet 11 inches (180 cm) tall.) and weighed 5,000 pounds (2,300 kg), matching the one used on the show. Adam and Jamie next built two house end walls with structural bracing to meet local building codes. With the ball pulled back 12 feet (3.7 m) to avoid tipping the crane to which it was attached, they swung it at one wall to evaluate the damage without Homer hanging on. The impact caused severe buckling and knocked a section of the chimney loose; when they attached Homer and repeated the test on the other wall, it flexed but exhibited much less visible damage, and Homer remained intact. Adam and Jamie classified the myth as plausible.

=== Toilet Bomb ===
Myth	Status	Notes
If a lit cherry bomb is flushed down a toilet, it will send water shooting out of every toilet attached to the same plumbing system when it explodes. Based on the episode "The Crepes of Wrath."	Busted	Adam built three half-scale cutaway toilet models, with a transparent viewing window and common piping system to show the water flows inside. He incorporated connections at several different positions to allow the introduction of a pressure surge similar to that produced by an exploding cherry bomb. Jamie used his soda-can launcher to provide a surge of 20 pounds per square inch (140 kPa); tests at each of several positions always sent a burst of water from each toilet. Placing a clog in the pipes led to a gusher of water instead, due to the pressure pushing against incompressible water rather than air. For a full-scale test, Adam and Jamie set a platform at the bomb range and mounted three toilets on it with common piping. To see if the fuse would have kept burning after the flush, they made a bomb of their own with a long fuse, placed it in a bucket of water, and lit the fuse. The gunpowder in the fuse allowed it to keep burning underwater, and the bomb exploded and shattered the bucket. With the pipes clogged, Adam and Jamie placed a bomb at the midpoint of the initial shared outlet pipe for the system and set it off. The explosion blew all three toilets off their mountings, which were not strong enough to withstand the force of the blast. A second test, with the toilets bolted directly to the piping and the bomb repositioned to the lowest point in the system, led to the same result and partially/completely destroyed them. Since they could not match the geysers of water seen in the episode, Adam and Jamie judged the myth busted. Al Jean would later justify the episode depiction by reasoning that the school would have reinforced the bathroom plumbing in order to protect it against a meltdown at the nearby nuclear plant, which he sardonically described as being run by "idiots."

== Episode 224 – "Indiana Jones Special" ==
- Original air date: January 17, 2015

Adam and Jamie investigate two scenes from the film Raiders of the Lost Ark.

=== Temple Run ===
Myth	Status	Notes
It is possible to survive a chamber full of wall-mounted poison dart launchers by running past them. Based on Indiana Jones' theft of the golden idol in the opening scene.	Plausible	Adam analyzed footage of the movie scene and determined that in order to escape the chamber, Indy would have had to run 30 feet (9.1 m) and avoid 16 separate dart launchers. Jamie built enough wall-mounted paintball guns to match, triggered by floor-mounted pressure plates. Adam and Jamie then constructed a mockup of the temple chamber and adjusted the time delay between triggering the plate and firing the gun to match that seen in the film (1 second). After further troubleshooting, Adam donned protective padding and ran across the chamber, matching Indy's running posture and speed. He was able to stay well ahead of the shots with the 1-second delay; when it was reduced to almost zero, he did take one hit. He and Jamie judged the myth to be plausible due to the fictionalized nature of the scenario.

=== The Science of Whips ===
Myth	Status	Notes
It is possible to disarm or neutralize a pistol-wielding opponent by targeting the gun hand with a whip.	Plausible	Adam custom-built a whip to match the length and design of the one carried by Indy. Finding it difficult to hit a small target with accuracy except at close range, Adam and Jamie brought in whip expert Anthony De Longis — who trained Harrison Ford for Indiana Jones and the Kingdom of the Crystal Skull — to train them. As Adam held a gun in a hand covered by a heavy glove, Jamie was able to snag his wrist and pull hard enough to throw off his aim. The two men then traded places, with Adam striking directly at Jamie's hand. Jamie felt the sting of the whip even through the glove, and stated that a hit on his unprotected hand would have been painful enough to make him drop the gun. With success in both methods, they deemed the myth plausible; however, Anthony commented that targeting the gunman's face would be far more effective than trying to disarm him.
The tip of a whip will break the sound barrier when it cracks.	Confirmed	Adam and Jamie built a large grid backdrop in order to isolate the area in which the tip of the whip would crack. Using a high-speed camera shooting at 6,000 frames per second, they were able to record (after much effort) the whip cracking at a speed of 1,200 feet per second (370 m/s), slightly in excess of the speed of sound (1,126 feet per second (343 m/s)).
It is possible to snag an overhead projection with a whip and swing safely across a chasm. Based on the opening scene.	Plausible	Adam and Jamie built a chasm from shipping containers, with a width of 12 feet (3.7 m) to match the scene, and hung a thick wooden post 9 feet (2.7 m) above to stand for the log. After several attempts, Adam was able to wrap the end of his whip around the post and pull it tight; however, when he tried to swing across, his weight caused the whip to come loose and he fell into the padding below. He and Jamie covered the post with sandpaper to simulate bark on an actual log, and the additional friction allowed Adam to complete the swing. He and Jamie classified the myth as plausible.

== Episode 225 – "A-Team Special" ==
- Original air date: January 24, 2015

Adam and Jamie test two scenes from the television series The A-Team.

=== Log Shooter ===
Myth	Status	Notes
A cannon fashioned from a log can fire half-width 2-by-4 planks, fueled by a propane explosion and mounted on a forklift.	Busted	Adam cut a log to a length of 40 inches (100 cm), as used in the scene, and bored out its center to serve as the cannon barrel. Jamie connected the breech to a propane tank and set up a spark generator as the ignition system. Their first trials, with a 5-second propane charge, failed to ignite; Adam realized that the fuel/air mixture contained too much propane to be flammable. When they used a 1-second charge, the mixture ignited but the plank projectile remained in place. Realizing that the space between the plank and the barrel wall allowed the combustion gases to escape, Adam machined a plastic plug to fit onto the end and seal the breech. The next test barely pushed the plank free of the cannon. Jamie then pumped oxygen into the breech along with the propane in an attempt to raise the explosion pressure. The first test with this mixture launched the plank across the workshop at high speed, but also split the cannon along its length. After patching it together, they tried several other propane/oxygen ratios but were unable to get a satisfactory launch. Declaring the myth busted at this point, they traveled to an abandoned lumber yard and gave themselves one hour to build a workable board launcher from tools and supplies on hand. They built a device similar to a baseball pitching machine, using an air-powered torque wrench to spin a trailer wheel at high speed and hurl boards fed to it from an ammunition hopper. With the rig mounted on a swiveling/tilting carriage carried by a forklift, they were able to hit a group of pop-up targets arranged as they were in the scene and achieve projectile speeds near 60 miles per hour (97 km/h).

=== Sewer Blast ===
Myth	Status	Notes
An explosion inside a sewer can propel a manhole cover up into a pursuing car, disabling it without injuring the people inside or any bystanders.	Plausible	For a control test, Adam and Jamie set up a stationary car at an abandoned quarry and placed nine sticks of dynamite on the ground beneath it, matching the explosive charge in the scene. They put Buster in the driver's seat, wired with sensors to measure the blast, and also placed plywood cutouts at distances of 10 feet (3.0 m) and 15 feet (4.6 m) to gauge shrapnel injuries. The explosion destroyed the car, with the blast wave spreading to either side from underneath and subjecting the bystanders to a lethal pressure of 90 pounds per square inch (620 kPa). Buster's sensors gave a peak of 26 pounds per square inch (180 kPa) - survivable, but with multiple severe injuries. They then dug a trench and covered it with metal plates and dirt to create a sewer with a manhole. One end was left open to the atmosphere in order to replicate an actual sewer system with areas for gases to expand. They set the dynamite just below the surface of the open manhole, put the cover in place, and placed a second car directly above it, with Buster and the bystanders positioned as before. This time, the blast briefly lifted the car into the air and inflicted much less damage than in the control test. Buster and the bystanders experienced pressures of 9 pounds per square inch (62 kPa) and 11 pounds per square inch (76 kPa), respectively, both survivable with minor injuries. Adam and Jamie decided that the myth was plausible.

== Episode 226 – "Video Game Special" ==
- Original air date: January 31, 2015

Adam and Jamie test two video game scenarios.

=== Doom ===
Myth	Status	Notes
It is possible to carry and deploy a large range of supplies and weapons without significantly hindering the user's mobility, as in Doom or another first-person shooter.	Plausible	In an abandoned building at Mare Island Naval Shipyard, Adam and Jamie set up an environment to replicate a Doom game level with advice from id Software creative director Tim Willits. Weapons and supplies were weighted to match their real-world counterparts (total weight 80 pounds (36 kg)), and crew members stood in for the enemies. Adam and Jamie each ran the level twice, stopping to pick up all items along the way and attacking the enemies. For the first run, they discarded the weapon they were carrying once they found a new one; for the second, they had to carry everything they picked up throughout the level. Jamie went first, achieving a time of 5:53 for his first run, while Adam did the same in 5:38. Their respective times on the second run were 11:59 and 10:17, with the increased weight and bulk of the items slowing them down greatly through the latter part of the level. Adam and Jamie then brought in professional mixed martial arts fighter Brendan Schaub to run the level, as they considered him to be a better real-world analog of the character controlled by the player in the game. His run times showed little difference (4:00 when discarding weapons, 4:03 while carrying them all), prompting them to declare the myth plausible as long as the person involved is in excellent physical shape.

=== Fruit Ninja ===
Myth	Status	Notes
It is possible to slice through as many airborne pieces of fruit in a short time using a katana as it is in the game Fruit Ninja.	Busted	Adam played three 60-second time trials of the game, using a wooden practice sword as the motion controller, and averaged 99.3 hits. At Hunters Point Naval Shipyard, he and Jamie set up an elevated platform for Adam to stand on and slice fruit with an actual katana as it was thrown up to him by three professional jugglers. Adam achieved 30 hits in 60 seconds on his first try. However, Jamie observed that the jugglers failed to match the game's throw rate and also sent some of their throws outside Adam's effective range. A second trial closer to the in-game conditions yielded 55 hits. The myth was declared busted at this point, due to the real fruit being smaller and accelerating faster due to gravity than the in-game ones. In addition, only the edge of the katana could inflict a slice; when Jamie repeated the test with a chainsaw, he was able to score many more hits than Adam.

== Episode 227 – "Transformers" ==
- Original air date: February 7, 2015

Adam and Jamie test myths related to vehicle transformation.

=== Motorcycle Car ===
Myth	Status	Notes
It is possible to convert a car into a working motorcycle using only hand tools. Based on a claim that Emile Leray reconfigured his own car in this fashion after it broke down in the deserts of Morocco.	Busted	MythBusters 2CV motocycle Adam and Jamie found a 1967 Citroën 2CV, the car at the center of the story, and drove it to a landfill in Kirby Canyon, California. Within 60 minutes, they had stripped it down to its wheels and undercarriage with little effort. They removed the wheels, mounted one so that the engine's output shaft pressed directly onto the tire, and attached the other one to the center of the rear end. Since this arrangement would cause the driving wheel to rotate backwards, the rear end became the motorcycle's front end. They added steering and suspension systems and fitted the engine with controls, including a hand-operated throttle. In preliminary tests, Jamie drove while Adam jogged alongside to shift gears and apply the brakes. They were unable to travel any significant distance, leading them to decide that their design was not suited for traveling long distances due to difficult steering and poor weight distribution. At the shop, they studied a set of photographs that purported to show the actual design used by the man in the story and set out to replicate it. This second design incorporated a tiller for steering and turned the engine around, placing it between the front and rear wheels; however, this configuration only allowed the use of reverse gear to move forward. Using power tools to speed up the work, they completed the vehicle and took it to a runway for testing. Both Adam and Jamie found that the reverse gear ran so slowly that the vehicle could barely stay upright, and they could not drive more than 150 feet (46 m) before tipping over. They deemed the myth busted, commenting that a loss of balance or a snagged body part or article of clothing could lead to severe injury.

=== Aqua Bike ===
Myth	Status	Notes
A bicycle can be modified to operate on both land and water. Based on photographs that allegedly show a person riding such a craft, equipped with empty water-cooler jugs for flotation.	Confirmed	The Aqua Bike made by Jamie After examining the photographs, Adam attached paddles to the rear wheel of a bicycle and built a frame to hold eight jugs as pontoons. He also added a locking mechanism to keep the jugs clear of the ground when riding on land. At a swimming pool, he was able to steer the bike on the water and achieve a satisfactory speed, even repairing a slipped chain without dismounting, but a sudden flip left him unable to right himself. Jamie then built a bicycle of his own, with more paddles on the rear wheel, an electric crankshaft to lower it into the water, and steel pontoons designed to reduce water resistance and increase stability. An initial test failed due to a leaking pontoon; after fixing this problem, he and Adam held a race on a lake. Starting from the shore, they had to set their bicycles up for water travel, then pedal out to a buoy and back. The race showed that the original design could be converted for use in the water more quickly, but Jamie's design moved through the water far more effectively and Jamie won handily. However, he and Adam considered the myth to be confirmed since the original design still worked as depicted.

== Episode 228 – "San Francisco Drift" ==
- Original air date: February 14, 2015

Adam and Jamie test myths related to automotive drifting.

=== Drift Turn ===
Myth	Status	Notes
A driver can turn corners more quickly by drifting than with conventional racing techniques.	Busted	Adam and Jamie received instruction in drifting from Formula D racer Conrad Grunewald. Jamie took his turn first, using Conrad's car; when rain began to fall afterward, the lessons continued in a typical passenger vehicle used for drifting. At a different location, Adam and Jamie set up a course to test their time in 90-degree and 180-degree turns. Driving at 45 miles per hour (72 km/h), they were to make each turn as quickly as possible using both drifting and non-drifting techniques. Adam hit the barricades on his first several attempts, but eventually achieved a time of 4 seconds for both drift and non-drift. Jamie recorded 4 seconds on his non-drift run, but repeatedly hit barricades on his drift runs and caused increasing amounts of damage to the car. From this point on, he performed only the non-drift trials while Adam carried out the drifting. In a 180-degree turn, their best times were 8 seconds (Jamie) and 9 seconds (Adam). Next they set up a road driving course with assorted twists and turns, and each drove several laps to achieve the best time possible. Jamie's fastest time was 1:54.50; after several laps with mistakes, Adam posted an identical error-free time. Finally, Conrad ran the course in 2:00, leading Adam and Jamie to call the myth busted, with Adam commenting that Conrad's time was longer than his owing to Conrad's more refined technique (thus demonstrating the real effect that safe drifting would actually have).

=== Powerslide Parking ===
Myth	Status	Notes
It is possible to drift into a parallel parking space without hitting either of the adjacent cars or the curb.	Plausible	Adam and Jamie set up a parking space 25 feet (7.6 m) long, marked off with traffic cones and a wooden curb, and tried to drift into it while driving at 40 miles per hour (64 km/h). After repeated failures due to either hitting the cones or missing the space, they both successfully parked the car - Jamie at a 90-degree turn, Adam at 180 degrees. They then replaced the cones with actual cars and shortened the space to 18 feet (5.5 m) to simulate a real-world scenario. Adam, outfitted in racing protective equipment, repeatedly hit one or both cars when he tried to drift into the space. He failed again with a limousine, hitting and eventually destroying the foam cutouts that were put in place of the cars to avoid any damage. Conrad then drifted the limousine into the space without hitting the curb or the cutouts, prompting Adam and Jamie to classify the myth as plausible.

== Episode 229 – "Blow It Out of the Water" ==
- Original air date: July 18, 2015

Adam and Jamie test two myths related to "blowing it out of the water", one literal and one metaphorical.

=== Boat Lift ===
Myth	Status	Notes
It is possible to trigger an explosion that can lift a boat out of the water in which it is floating without destroying it.	Busted	At the workshop, Adam and Jamie filled a clear plastic tank with 24 inches (61 cm) of water, placed a model boat inside, and detonated 15-gram charges of black powder at varying depths. A surface detonation destroyed the boat, while a test at half depth lifted and flipped the boat, but also blew out the seals holding the panels to the tank frame. Once the tank was repaired, they performed a third test with the charge at the bottom and were able to lift the boat, but not as far as in the second test. For a full-scale test, they set a 51 ft (16 m), 48,000 lb (22,000 kg) steel-hulled boat on a quarry lake, anchored to the shore to keep it in place. An explosive charge of 1,000 pounds (450 kg) ANFO was hung underneath the boat at a depth of 30 feet (9.1 m), half the total depth of the lake, and 1,500 pounds (680 kg) sand was added to ensure that the charge would not float to the surface. The detonation system failed on the first attempt; after it was replaced, the ANFO charge blew the boat to pieces. Adam and Jamie judged the myth as busted, and Jamie commented that the explosion created a bubble of gas that expanded with enough force to tear the boat apart rather than lift it.

=== Machine Gun Booby Trap ===
Before this episode, Jamie, Adam, Kari, Tory and Grant had busted two Breaking Bad myths from Season 1 on a Breaking Bad special in 2013: The use of hydrofluoric acid to completely dissolve a body and eat through a bathtub and a floor (from Cat's in the Bag) and the use of mercury fulminate to incapacitate attackers without harming the user (from Crazy Handful of Nothin'). Breaking Bad creator/director Vince Gilligan and co-star Aaron Paul (Jesse Pinkman) had appeared in the 2013 special.

Myth	Status	Notes
The booby trap built by Walter White in Felina, the series finale of Breaking Bad, using a remote-controlled M60 machine gun on a motorized swiveling mount in a car trunk, could realistically fire into a house and kill a roomful of people.	Plausible	Adam and Jamie first tested the M60 at a firing range to evaluate the recoil and vibration that the mounting system would have to endure. Adam fired 45 rounds in short bursts, while Jamie fired 70 rounds in full automatic; next they mounted the M60 on a table and fired 200 rounds at a plywood human silhouette. In every case, they decided that the recoil and vibration were manageable. At the workshop, they examined the scene to determine the components of Walter's mounting/triggering system and set out to replicate it as closely as possible. The swiveling mount had a garage door opener at its core; Jamie disabled its safety mechanisms so that the motor would run without stopping, and Adam added a gear and bicycle chain to reduce the swiveling speed. Even though this modification was not part of the scene, Adam reasoned that Walter might have been able to include it if necessary, using readily available parts. Returning to the firing range, they mounted the M60 in a car trunk and placed it in front of a wall constructed to match the stucco front of the house in the scene. Plywood silhouette targets were placed behind the wall, one lying down to represent Walter, the others standing up as his enemies. After preliminary tests and fine-tuning with both no ammunition and blanks, they loaded 200 rounds and set the weapon to full auto, with Gilligan present to witness the final test. The weapon malfunctioned and did not fire on the first two attempts, but did fire on the third; all of the standing targets were hit multiple times, while "Walter" did not suffer any damage. The myth was deemed plausible, and Vince commented on two results of the test. First, the pattern of bullet holes produced was very different from the one simulated by the Breaking Bad production crew; second, the vertical vibrations of the mounting system made it very likely that Walter would have been struck by a bullet while lying on the floor, as happened in the episode.

== Episode 230 – "Flights of Fantasy" ==
- Original air date: July 25, 2015

Adam and Jamie test two flight related myths.

=== U-2 Flight ===
Myth	Status	Notes
The Lockheed U-2 reconnaissance plane is harder to fly and land safely than any other type of aircraft in the world.	Plausible	Adam and Jamie traveled to Beale Air Force Base for a week-long orientation and passenger training program. They learned about the challenges that U-2 crews face, including long missions at altitudes over 50,000 feet (15,000 m), technical issues of takeoff and landing, and being able to move and work while wearing high-altitude pressure suits. The plane only had space for one passenger; noting Adam's enthusiasm for the U-2, Jamie allowed him to take the flight. As the plane flew a practice mission to a maximum altitude of 70,000 feet (21,000 m), Adam commented on the crew's activities during all phases of the flight. During the landing, the pilot's limited visibility required a second pilot to follow him in a chase car and talk him down, with Jamie riding along. Due to the difficulties associated with the specialized purpose for which the plane was designed and built, Adam and Jamie classified the myth as plausible and "Ultra-Cool."

=== Deadly Drones ===
Myth	Status	Notes
An unmanned drone in flight can inflict a severe injury with its propellers.	Plausible	At the workshop, Jamie mounted a multirotor propeller on a long pole, spun it up to flight speed, and was able to cut a deep gash in a plucked chicken carcass. Adam then built a neck analog from ballistic gelatin with embedded vinyl tubing "veins," mounted it at a proper human height, and filled it with simulated blood. Jamie steered two different commercially available multirotors — four propellers, then six — toward the neck; in each case, the blades bent and the craft fell to the floor without causing any noticeable injury. For a final test, Jamie had one of the camera operators pilot an eight-propeller craft he had built to hold a video camera. It fell to the floor upon striking the neck, but the blades (made of carbon-fiber instead of the plastic used in the store-bought models) cut into one of the veins. He and Adam declared the myth plausible, noting that while small store-bought models are designed with safety in mind, larger custom-built models can pose a real danger.

== Episode 231 – "Accidental Ammo" ==
- Original US air date: August 1, 2015
- Original Finland air date: May 27, 2015

Adam and Jamie test two myths of possibly lethal projectiles.

=== Lethal Lawnmowers ===
Myth	Status	Notes
A rock kicked up by a lawnmower can deliver the same energy and force as a bullet fired from a .357 Magnum revolver.	Confirmed	At the firing range, Adam and Jamie set up a fake lawn consisting of plywood covered with artificial turf and scattered a line of rocks down its length. Styrofoam blocks painted with human silhouettes were set up in a parallel line to allow them to gauge impacts easily. Adam ran a commercially available self-propelled mower over the rocks, first removing a hinged flap intended to catch debris. He stopped after several feet due to bits of rock debris being thrown back in his face, and the targets showed multiple hits, some of which penetrated the full thickness of the blocks. Jamie's trial with a riding mower tore up the turf and inflicted many more hits. At the workshop, they removed the gasoline engine from a mower and replaced it with an electric motor so they could control its speed. They mounted the mower on a thick sheet of acrylic plastic, tilted it backwards, brought the motor up to speed, and lowered it onto the rocks. The blades cut the rocks to pieces and threw them in all directions, with a maximum speed of 400 feet per second (120 m/s). For comparison, Jamie returned to the firing range and fired bullets of various calibers, measuring speeds between 1,000 feet per second (300 m/s) and 1,400 feet per second (430 m/s). Since the rocks had more mass than the bullets, Adam and Jamie decided to investigate the relative energy carried by each. They built a ballistic pendulum to measure the energy, based on how far the pendulum swung up after being struck by a projectile. A test with a .357 Magnum round gave an angle of 60 degrees; with a rock fired from an air cannon at 400 feet per second (120 m/s), the pendulum swung 66 degrees. Since this result meant that the rock was delivering more energy than the bullet, Adam and Jamie declared the myth confirmed. Jamie then decided to build what he described as the "Lawnmower from Hell," using a 200-horsepower (150 kW) motor and a 50-pound (23 kg) blade spinning at 5,000 rpm. After he tested it by running over a bucket of water and shredding it, Adam set up a course of other objects, including rocks, wooden pallets, and metal debris. However, as soon as Jamie hit the first obstacle—a group of watermelons—the blade broke loose and spun across the grass. He and Adam decided not to test the mower any further until they could improve its reliability.

=== Glass Guillotine ===
Myth	Status	Notes
A pane of glass dropped from a sufficient height can cut a person in half.	Busted (tempered glass), Plausible (plate glass)	Adam and Jamie molded a human head/torso dummy from molten ballistic gelatin, embedding several bags of simulated blood and lining the mold with polyethylene fabric. Although one bag disintegrated during cooling, they decided to use the dummy. At a training facility used by the Santa Rosa Fire Department, they set the dummy in a standing position at the base of a building, hoisted a pane of tempered glass up to the roof, and dropped it from a height of 75 feet (23 m). The pane was 4 feet (1.2 m) by 6 feet (1.8 m), with a thickness of 0.375 inches (9.5 mm). After their first test resulted in a miss due to the pane drifting off target, Adam designed a guide system to bring it down accurately. Once the system was installed, a second test led to a direct hit but inflicted only crushing injuries on the dummy. When they switched to a pane of plate glass that they had broken to give a sharp edge, the impact cut the dummy into two pieces. Adam and Jamie noted that tempered glass is designed to fracture into small pieces when broken, while plate glass can shatter into dangerous shards; however, being hit by a pane of either type would still lead to fatal injuries. They classified the myth as busted for tempered glass (used in modern office buildings), but plausible for plate glass.

== Episode 232 – "Dangerous Driving" ==
- Original air date: August 8, 2015

The MythBusters test two myths related to driving, and how dangerous they are.

=== Distracted Driving ===
Myth	Status	Notes
It is just as dangerous to use a cell phone hands-free while driving as it is to use a cell phone while held in the driver's hand.	Confirmed	Initial testing was done on a course set up at the Alameda runway that Adam and Jamie had no prior knowledge of. To isolate the variable of learning the course, Adam ran the course "hands-full" first followed by hands-free, while Jamie did the inverse. For each run, the driver was asked a series of different types of questions meant to stimulate different areas of the brain used in driving, as opposed to the two parties simply carrying on a normal conversation. The results were overwhelmingly in favor of the myth: neither passed either run, both did better on their second run regardless of technique, and the average scores for each technique were nearly identical. Feeling that the course lacked realism (due to the lack of traffic) and that they weren't representative of someone with average driving skills, Adam and Jamie set up additional testing in a driving simulator at Stanford University's Automotive Innovation facility, with the help of 30 volunteers (15 for each technique). Only 1 volunteer for each technique successfully completed the run, and the others failed at a near-identical ratio across techniques of getting lost-to-crashing. Additionally, an eye-tracking system used to measure the distraction of the volunteers quantitatively showed that drivers looked away from the road for an identical amount of time regardless of technique. With an overwhelming amount of evidence showing no difference between hands-full and hands-free, Adam and Jamie declared the myth confirmed.

=== Driving in Reverse ===
Myth	Status	Notes
It is easy for someone to drive a vehicle in reverse at high speed.	Plausible	An early test proved that it was possible to go to highway speeds in reverse, as long as the driver was driving perfectly straight, but the unstable equilibrium of the car's steering in reverse meant that real road tests would be more difficult. Initially, both Adam and Jamie had significant difficulty in driving the car in reverse on the road course, but advice from an instructor and a shift in technique (having the driver position himself in the center of the car and look backward through the rear windshield) made the task surprisingly easy. A final test, with Adam driving in reverse and Jamie chasing Adam in a car driving forward, had Adam successfully evade Jamie for some time before Adam was finally caught. Because Adam was caught, they couldn't call the myth confirmed, but the surprising ease of the task otherwise allowed the two to call the myth Plausible.

== Episode 233 – "Supernatural Shooters" ==
- Original US air date: August 15, 2015
- Original Netherlands and Belgium air date: May 10, 2015

Adam and Jamie test two myths related to unusual use of bullets. Actor Jonathan Banks, from Breaking Bad, makes a guest appearance.

=== Shooting Through Walls ===
Myth	Status	Notes
It is possible to fire a bullet through a wall and hit a moving target on the other side.	Confirmed	Adam and Jamie built six sample walls from various materials and fired 9 mm rounds at them, using high-speed cameras to track the bullets’ speed and trajectory on each side. Walls made from lath and plaster, drywall and insulation, and both wooden and sheet metal studs allowed the bullets to pass through virtually unimpeded, slowing them only slightly from their initial speed of 1,200 feet per second (370 m/s). Copper plumbing pipes within one wall changed the trajectory slightly, while a steel electrical junction box in the last one stopped the bullet completely. Adam set up a full-size cutout of himself to move via remote control on a track that ran behind a wall. One man remotely controlled the target's motion, while the other fired. For the first test, the target was moved at a consistent walking speed behind the wall, and one shot was allowed; both Adam and Jamie were able to score a hit. In a second test, the target was equipped with a speaker that broadcast the sound of footsteps, and the shooter was given three shots as it moved back and forth. Neither Adam nor Jamie was able to hit it under these conditions. For a final test, they traveled to Mare Island Naval Shipyard and set up a labyrinth of rooms with paper walls. Armed with paintball guns, they were allowed a maximum of 8 shots each per trial; the first to hit the other was the winner. Jamie beat Adam twice, using a combination of briefly glimpsing Adam through the doorways, predicting his movements, and listening for his approach. Based on both these results and the firing range tests, they classified the myth as confirmed.

=== Shoot 'Em Up Bullets ===
Myth	Status	Notes
It is possible for a person to hold bullets between his fingers, put his hand into a fire, and discharge them within seconds to inflict lethal wounds on an enemy. Based on a scene in the film Shoot 'Em Up.	Busted	At the bomb range, Adam and Jamie set up a wood-burning fireplace, removed the bullet from a 9 mm round, and positioned the casing approximately 3 inches (7.6 cm) above the flames to match the scene. The primer and powder ignited after 43 seconds, much longer than the 2 seconds observed in the scene. A second casing placed deep within the coals ignited in 10 seconds. To determine whether the bullets could be aimed accurately and remain lethal, Jamie built a metal hand to hold the rounds, covered it with a leather glove, and calibrated its grip strength to match force data supplied by Adam. Returning to the bomb range, they set up the hand to hold one round and aimed a blowtorch flame at the base. After the flame blew out in the first trials, they changed torch heads to produce a more concentrated flame and were able to set off the round within 10 seconds. However, the bullet speed was only 120 feet per second (37 m/s), due to the lack of a gun barrel to focus the pressure of the expanding gases in a single direction. When they repeated the test with a ballistic gelatin dummy placed directly in front of the hand, the bullet struck the chest, but embedded itself very shallowly. Based on the long time and high heat needed to set the cartridge off and the minimal injury inflicted, they declared the myth busted.

== Episode 234 – "Unfinished Business" ==
- Original air date: August 22, 2015

Adam and Jamie revisit four past episodes to address viewers' disputes over myth results and suggestions for additional testing.

=== Video Game Skills ===
Myth statement	Status	Notes
A video game that simulates a skill can improve a player's real-world performance of that skill. A revisit of the "Video Game Special" from earlier in this season.	Busted	Adam and Jamie chose golf as the skill to be tested, since neither had ever played the game before. At the Pebble Beach Golf Links, they practiced their swings and played four holes without any training as a control test. Adam scored 43, Jamie 47, after which they underwent separate training programs for one day. While Adam took lessons at the Pebble Beach Golf Academy, Jamie played a golf arcade game (John Daly’s ProStroke) at the workshop and tried to incorporate the on-screen information into his playing. When they played the same four holes as in the control test, Adam scored 33 (a 10-stroke improvement), but Jamie’s score fell only two strokes to 45. Analysis of their swings before and after training revealed that Adam had learned much more than Jamie about the technical aspects of the swing. These two sets of results led them to classify the myth as busted.

=== Spy Car Tacks ===
Myth statement	Status	Notes
Hollow road spikes are more effective at stopping a pursuing car than solid ones, due to their ability to let air escape from the tires after puncturing them. A revisit of "Spy Car Escape" from 2010.	Confirmed	Adam assembled a set of road spikes from hollow steel tubing, and he and Jamie set up a driving course on an airfield runway. Jamie, riding in the back of a pickup truck, dumped the spikes onto the path as Adam tried to keep pace behind him. Within 15 seconds of hitting the spikes, all four of Adam's tires deflated and came loose from the wheel rims, bringing him to a stop. Jamie noted that the hollow spikes could incapacitate a car either by letting air escape through them, or by ripping a hole in the tire if they came loose. He and Adam called this myth confirmed.

=== Get a Grip ===
Myth statement	Status	Notes
It is difficult for a person to hold a live hand grenade with the pin removed for long periods of time. A revisit of the "Fire in the Hole" episode from 2014, with the myth itself sourced from the ninth episode of The Bridge.	Busted	Adam built a mockup of a small room with transparent walls for observation, and Jamie rigged a dummy grenade with a mechanism that would trigger a secret "consequence" if Adam let go of it. Locked in the room, Adam pulled the pin and held the grenade to keep the spring-loaded safety lever from popping off. After two hours, he had developed a mild cramp in his forearm but was having no trouble maintaining his grip. He then used pantyhose to tie the lever down and demonstrate that the grenade could be kept from exploding indefinitely with no exertion on his part. In the end, Adam deliberately released the lever in order to discover the "consequence": a mechanism that blasted him with paint. He and Jamie declared the myth busted, since the grenade could easily be neutralized.

=== Super Fast Reload ===
Myth statement	Status	Notes
It is possible to fire and reload a pistol as quickly as depicted in Hollywood action movies.	Confirmed	At a target range, Adam and Jamie started by firing three 20-round magazines of blanks through a semiautomatic pistol as quickly as possible. Their times were 28 seconds and 38 seconds, respectively; both noticed that their shooting speeds slowed during the trial due to fatigue in their trigger fingers, and that they lost time on the magazine changes. They switched to live ammunition and repeated the test, keeping track of both their time and accuracy in hitting a human-silhouette target. Both made 57 hits out of 60, with Adam taking 25 seconds and Jamie 33. When professional competition shooter Travis Tomasie attempted the feat, he took 17 seconds and hit the target with all 60 shots, in the process successfully replicating the quick magazine change of the films. Based on his performance, Adam and Jamie judged the myth as confirmed.

== Episode 235 – "MythBusters vs. Jaws" ==
- Original air date: August 29, 2015

Adam and Jamie revisit a myth based on the film Jaws and test two new shark-based myths. This episode is part of Discovery's new two-day shark-themed weekend called "Shweekend".

=== Jaws Finale Revisit ===
Myth	Status	Notes
A scuba tank in a shark's jaws can explode it if shot with a bullet. A revisit of "Scuba Tank Explosion" from 2005, based on the final scene of the film Jaws.	Re-Busted	Adam and Jamie chose to consider three issues raised by fans: the possibility that the tank might have exploded if only grazed by the bullet, the effect of different bullet calibers, and the chance of injury caused by the punctured tank rocketing down the shark's gullet. Adam examined preserved shark specimens to understand their anatomical structures, and he and Jamie then built a shark analog to replicate these properties. Cowhide leather was used to simulate the esophagus and stomach, layers of carpet strips stood for the muscles, and an outer layer of painted upholstery foam was added as the skin. Naming the shark Brewster, they placed it in a quarry pond and set a scuba tank containing 80 cubic feet (2,300 L) of air at 3,000 pounds per square inch (21,000 kPa) in its mouth. The bottom of the tank faced outward, and Adam shot it with a .30-06 rifle from 110 feet (34 m), to match the movie scene. Although the bullet punctured the tank, the air release drove it only a few feet down the gullet; it did not enter the esophagus, and Adam and Jamie reasoned that the shark might be able to expel it. For their second test, they investigated the effect of a grazing impact, thinking that it could create a weak spot in the tank wall and lead to an explosion. Adam fired six shots at the side of the tank, all of which ricocheted away without effect; a seventh shot, with a .30-06 armor-piercing round, gave the same result. When Jamie shot the tank bottom with a .50 sniper rifle, it punctured and was propelled into Brewster's body, bursting out near the tail. Another shot, to the side of the tank, also failed to burst it. Declaring the myth busted, they fitted a tank with a small charge of C-4 and set it off in Brewster's mouth; the tank exploded with enough force to tear the head off and shred the body with shrapnel.

=== Orca Shark Repellent ===
Myth	Status	Notes
Sharks can be driven away from an area by the sound of orcas underwater.	Busted	Adam and Jamie visited an area in the Bahamas where both sharks and orcas had been sighted. With Jamie observing near a shipwreck on the ocean floor, Adam lowered a box of chum into the water and played sounds through an underwater speaker. For a control test, a recording of humpback whales (not a natural predator of sharks) was used, and Jamie reported that the sharks were unaffected. A mixture of orca sounds was played for 10 minutes, including sounds associated with their hunting behavior, but Jamie saw no change in the sharks’ behavior. He and Adam classified the myth as busted.

=== Dead Shark Repellent ===
Myth	Status	Notes
The smell of a dead shark can repel live ones.	Confirmed	Adam and Jamie obtained a concentrated liquid sample of the aroma compounds present in dead sharks and set up a new experiment in the Bahamas. They hid a box of chum on the ocean floor to attract sharks and went underwater. Jamie released the repellent as Adam watched from a distance; the sharks quickly left the test area and did not begin to return for nearly 6 minutes. No other fish in the area showed any visible reaction. They repeated the test in a different location, with Jamie and the underwater camera crew feeding the sharks to bring them to the edge of a frenzy. When he released the repellent, they quickly fled the area and did not begin to return for nearly 5 minutes. Adam and Jamie judged the myth as confirmed, and Adam noted that the repellent had not been made from any of the shark species observed in either test.

== Episode 236 – "Star Wars 2" ==
- Original air date: September 5, 2015

For the second time, the MythBusters explore sagas related to the Star Wars universe with two more myths.

=== Blaster Dodge ===
Myth	Status	Notes
It is possible to dodge a barrage of Stormtrooper blaster fire.	Busted	By analyzing footage from the Star Wars films, Adam determined that the blaster bolts moved at an average speed of 130 miles per hour (210 km/h). Jamie built a pneumatic cannon to launch projectiles at this speed, testing various materials for safety and behavior in flight. Polyethylene foam slugs and standard Ping-Pong balls did not fly straight or reach the required speed, but foam balls with dart-like shafts and feathers performed satisfactorily. They set up a replica of a Rebel ship passageway, 40 feet (12 m) long, with the launcher mounted in a stand and firing from one end to the other. When they test-fired on a Stormtrooper mannequin, they found the shots hitting far off target, suggesting a problem with the mass-produced shafts and feathers. Jamie replaced these with two wooden ice cream spoons, crossed to make the ball spin in flight, and was able to hit the mannequin consistently. Each man fired three shots at the other and hit him every time. In a second trial, the shooter held the launcher in a "carry" position, with the barrel lowered, and had to raise it to firing position before each shot. Even with this change, neither Adam nor Jamie was able to dodge any of the shots. They classified the myth as busted, but watched as fencing expert Colby Boothman successfully deflected some shots with a bamboo sword, noting that a Jedi knight could possibly protect himself with his lightsaber.

=== High Ground ===
Myth	Status	Notes
In a one-on-one sword fight, the combatant on the higher ground has a significant advantage. Based on the lightsaber duel between Obi-Wan Kenobi and Anakin Skywalker at the end of Star Wars: Episode III – Revenge of the Sith.	Busted	Adam and Jamie decided that the winner of each duel would be the person who first touched the other with his blade. Adam designed suits made from conductive copper fabric, with belts that lit up when a hit was scored; he also fabricated lightsaber hilts with lightweight carbon-fiber tubes as blades, covered with foam pipe insulation and copper mesh. He and Jamie fought 25 duels on a flat platform as a control test, with 13 wins for Adam and 12 for Jamie. They then set one platform higher than the other and fought 25 more duels, with Adam on the high platform. As the duels progressed, Jamie began to score wins by blocking Adam's attacks and striking at his ankles. Although Adam won 14-11, he and Jamie did not consider their results to be conclusive because neither man had any experience with sword fighting. After a training session with Colby, they built a set to re-create the conditions of the duel, including a ramp with an uneven surface to match the incline on which Obi-Wan and Anakin fought. They fought 50 duels, with each man taking the high ground for 25; overall, the high man won 24 times, the low man 26. Since the results for the two positions were so evenly matched, Adam and Jamie judged the myth as busted.
