= MythBusters (2014 season) =

Season of television series

- No. of episodes: 15

Release
- Original network: Discovery Channel
- Original release: January 4 – August 21, 2014

Season chronology
- ← Previous; 2013 season Next → 2015 season

The cast of the television series MythBusters perform experiments to verify or debunk urban legends, old wives' tales, and the like. This is a list of the various myths tested on the show as well as the results of the experiments (the myth is either busted, plausible, or confirmed). The 2014 season premiered on January 4, 2014, changing to a Saturday time slot. The show resumed in July, called a "new season" by the Discovery Channel. It then moved to a Thursday time slot.

This would be the last season for Kari Byron, Tory Belleci and Grant Imahara, after it was announced the build team would not be returning for the 2015 season. Hyneman and Savage would be the sole hosts of the show from this point onwards. In December 2014, Savage would go on to address the Build Team departures, indicating that the separation was a result of failed contract negotiations between Discovery Networks and the team members.

== Episode overview ==
No. overall	No. in season	Title	Original release date	Overall episode No.
208	1	"Star Wars Special"	January 4, 2014	229
Myths tested: Could Luke have safely swung across the chasm in the Death Star while carrying Princess Leia? Would the Ewoks' swinging log trap have destroyed an Imperial walker? Would a Tauntaun carcass have kept Luke from freezing to death on the cold climate of Hoth?
209	2	"Moonshiner Myths"	January 11, 2014	230
Myths tested: Can a moonshine still explode and destroy the shack it is hidden in? Can a car fueled by moonshine run as well as one running on gasoline?
210	3	"Hollywood Car Crash Cliches"	January 18, 2014	231
Myths tested: Can two men carrying a pane of glass survive unscathed if a car smashes through it? Can a rocket-propelled grenade explosion flip an SUV? Can a large truck plow through a traffic jam without stopping?
211	4	"Car Chase Chaos / Animal Antics" "Car Chase Chaos/Animal Avoidance"	January 25, 2014 (US); June 3, 2013 (AUS)	232
Myths tested: Can you share the task of driving, change places while driving, or push the driver out while moving at regular speed? Can you prevent cats from defecating in your garden? What methods work best to repel snakes? What methods work best to deter bears?
212	5	"*DO* Try This at Home?"	February 1, 2014	233
Myths tested: Can watering plants with microwaved water kill them? Can you put out a fire on a lake by turning a boat at an angle? Can metronomes started at different times sync together? Can a ball chain "levitate" over a lip of a cup? Can sugar and sulfuric acid explode like a "black snake"? Are dry ice bombs lethal? Can hydrogen peroxide, yeast, water, liquid dish soap, and food coloring create "elephant toothpaste"? Can water coming out of a hose with a speaker next to it create an optical illusion that it is going backwards?
213	6	"Mythssion Impossible"	February 15, 2014	234
Myths tested: Can you herd cats? Can you catch a greased pig? Can you stuff 10 pounds of feces into a 5-pound bag?
214	7	"Bullet Baloney"	February 22, 2014	235
Myths tested: Can a gun fire lethally if its barrel is bent? Can tape measures and wallets stop bullets? Will a shotgun shell on the tip of a wooden spear detonate if jabbed into an attacking animal? Can a gun work in outer space? Will a neon sign blow out in a shower of sparks if hit by a bullet? Can a gun discharge on its own if thrown into a deep fryer?
215	8	"Supersonic Ping Pong/Ice Cannon"	March 1, 2014	236
Myths tested: Can a ping pong ball inflict a lethal injury if it flies fast enough? Can a cannon and cannonballs made from ice be a reliable weapon?
216	9	"Fire in the Hole"	July 10, 2014	237
Myths tested: Could someone shoot a live grenade in midair and thus render it useless? Can you contain a TNT explosion inside an ordinary object?
217	10	"Household Disasters"	July 17, 2014 (US); May 26, 2014 (AUS)	238
Myths tested: Can an explosion caused by a hot-water heater put out a fire? Is sunscreen flammable? Can a piano being raised into a house fall and break through the roof and the floor of a house? Will a vacuum explode if it vacuums up black powder?
218	11	"Commercial Myths" "Apple Bobbing Bungee/Tennis Wing Walk"	July 24, 2014 (US); May 19, 2014 (AUS)	239
Myths tested: Can you bob for an apple during a 100 foot bungee jump? Can you really play tennis on an airplane wing mid-flight?
219	12	"Road Rage" "Driving This Crazy"	July 31, 2014 (US); May 12, 2014 (AUS)	240
Myths tested: When two cars try to knock each other off the road does it always result in a long and difficult duel? Is the silver screen trick of tipping up on to two wheels and driving sideways as easy as it seems? Can a Corvette be used as a ramp to flip into a barrel roll as in the movie Wanted?
220	13	"Laws of Attraction"	August 7, 2014	241
Myths tested: Do males prefer women with blonde hair? Do pheromone sprays work? Are women attracted to wealthy men? Do men give larger tips to women with larger breasts? Does a person’s intelligence deteriorate in the presence of members of the opposite gender?
221	14	"Traffic Tricks"	August 7, 2014 (US); July 22, 2013 (AUS)	242
Myths tested: If a single car brakes lightly, can it cause a ripple that triggers a major traffic jam? Is it better to stay in one lane in heavy traffic instead of changing lanes? Are roundabouts more efficient than four-way stop signs? For journeys less than 400 miles, is driving faster than flying?
222	15	"Plane Boarding" "Plane Boarding/Bite the Bullet"	August 21, 2014 (US); September 17, 2012 (AUS)	243
Myths tested: Is the method used for boarding planes by most airlines inefficient? Can you make an untraceable bullet out of teeth? Note: This episode marked the final appearance of Kari Byron, Grant Imahara, and Tory Belleci on the US schedule. This is the last episode to use the 2006 opening sequence and The Dandy Warhols arrangement of the theme music.

== Episode 208 – "Star Wars Special" ==
- Original air date: January 4, 2014

Adam, Jamie, and the Build Team examined three scenes from the Star Wars film series—eventually choosing one scene from each episode of the original trilogy. This episode is alternatively referred to as "Star Wars: Revenge of the Myth" or "SithBusters." They tested...

Myth	Status	Notes
...Luke Skywalker's grappling-hook swing across the chasm in the Death Star, while carrying Princess Leia, to escape the pursuing Stormtroopers. (A New Hope)	Plausible	Adam and Jamie chose three elements for testing: the ease of throwing/launching a grappling hook and cable and snagging an overhead fixture, the effects of using only a waist belt for weight support, and the effect of a second person's weight on the ability to make the swing. Jamie built a hook similar to the one Luke used, and at a warehouse at Mare Island Naval Shipyard, he practiced throwing it at an overhead strut approximately 30 feet (9.1 m) away. He was only able to snag the strut after several tries, prompting him to declare this part of the myth plausible but unlikely. For further testing, Adam and Jamie set up two platforms 30 feet (9.1 m) apart. Jamie was concerned that using only a belt to support his weight could lead to serious injury, so he did a short test swing only a few feet above the ground while carrying a Leia dummy. He was able to complete the swing but suffered considerable pain; as a result, he declared the second part of the myth plausible but likely to injure a person badly. For the third part, Jamie donned a safety harness and performed the swing first by himself, then carrying the dummy. After both of these attempts succeeded, he made one last swing carrying Sophia Bush as a stand-in for Leia (complete with her dress and hairdo while Jamie and Adam dressed as Luke and Han), and was able to cross the gap safely. He and Adam declared the overall myth plausible. Note: The Stormtroopers in the episode were all members of the Golden Gate Chapter of the 501st Legion. Adam and Grant - both Industrial Light and Magic alumnus - were already honorary members, and Jamie was inducted into the New England Chapter in 2014.
...the Ewoks' destruction of an Imperial AT-ST walker by crushing it between two swinging logs. (Return of the Jedi)	Plausible	With help from a local power crew, the Build Team used telephone poles to construct and brace a set of support frames to hold the logs. They estimated that the logs were 10 feet (3.0 m) long and 5 feet (1.5 m) in diameter, and chose eucalyptus wood for its hardness; each log weighed approximately 10,000 pounds (4,500 kg). From studying the movie scene, they determined that the logs were pulled back 45 degrees and released to hit the AT-ST at a height of 20 feet (6.1 m). The team placed a passenger van at this height and began to pull the logs back, but the structure began to buckle well before they reached 45 degrees. When the logs were released, the impact damaged both sides of the van considerably, prompting the team to try a full-scale test on an armored truck. In order to be able to reach a larger swing angle, they reinforced the structure and lowered the logs to just above ground level. This time, the logs punched the truck's side panels off the frame, leading the team to declare the myth plausible. However, they noted that the chances of such a trap succeeding were very small, since the logs would have to be placed at just the right height to hit the AT-ST. For a final test, they put a Stormtrooper dummy in the driver's seat and repeated the swing; the dummy was smashed to pieces.
...Han Solo's use of a Tauntaun carcass to keep Luke warm on the planet Hoth. (The Empire Strikes Back)	Plausible	Adam carved a Tauntaun from a block of foam and added an outer layer of synthetic skin and fur, while Jamie created simulated organs to fill the body cavity and conduct heat in a realistic manner. They decided to use the dummy from the 2012 myth "A Titanic Tale", dubbed "Thermo Boy", to stand in for Luke as it had a circulatory system and a heater to simulate human metabolism. A food refrigeration facility was chosen to simulate the cold climate on Hoth, and Adam and Jamie built an insulated chamber inside that could be loaded with dry ice to achieve a temperature of −40 °C. Both Thermo Boy and the organs were warmed to 99 °F (37 °C) and loaded into the Tauntaun, which was then moved into the chamber; once Thermo Boy had cooled to 95 °F (35 °C), Adam and Jamie started to monitor his temperature. They reasoned that Han might need 2.5 hours to build an emergency shelter for himself and Luke, and that Luke would die of hypothermia if his temperature fell to 82 °F (28 °C) within that time. At the end of the test, Thermo Boy had only cooled to 92 °F (33 °C), and Adam and Jamie deemed the myth plausible, speculating that the reason for this might be the strong ability of water (which composes the majority of most mammals) to absorb and retain heat.

== Episode 209 – "Moonshiner Myths" ==
- Original air date: January 11, 2014

Adam, Jamie, and the Build Team examined two myths based on the Discovery Channel series Moonshiners. They tested...

=== Exploding Still ===
Myth	Status	Notes
A malfunctioning moonshine still can explode with enough force to destroy the shack in which it is housed.	Confirmed	Adam built a copper still in the workshop, while Jamie acquired a steel milk can that had been fitted with an internal heater and modified for use as a still. They fermented a load of corn mash and distilled it to obtain 156-proof moonshine, noting that they had obtained permits allowing them to do so legally. They built a shack, placed Adam's still inside, and plugged the condenser outlet to simulate a clog in the tubing that would allow pressure to build up. The still was loaded with pure ethanol and heated; there was no explosion after 30 minutes, but Adam and Jamie observed large quantities of smoke and flames coming from the shed. They found that the still had been destroyed by fire, and Adam theorized that gradual failure of the material and welds would have let the ethanol vapor escape slowly enough to burn rather than explode. In the workshop, they boiled a pan of ethanol inside a model shack and experimented with methods for igniting the vapor. An open flame, created by sparking a rag tucked between electrodes, caused an explosion that blew out one of the model's walls. For a second full-scale test, Jamie's still was set up in a new shack, heated, and allowed to vent its vapor until a flammable concentration had been reached. When they sparked the rag, representing a cigarette being lit by an unsuspecting moonshiner, it triggered an explosion that blew the shack apart. Adam and Jamie declared the myth confirmed.

=== Firewater Fuel ===
Myth	Status	Notes
A car can run properly on moonshine without any modifications.	Confirmed	The Build Team decided to test the operability, performance, and longevity of cars running on moonshine. For operability testing, they obtained three cars of the same make and model, but from different decades: 1970s (carbureted), 1990s (fuel injected), 2010s (fuel injected, modern). They laid out a course with sections designed to test starting, acceleration, maneuvering, and turns. Each car ran 3 laps with 192-proof moonshine in the fuel tank. Tory, in the 1970s car, had trouble with stalling when he started and was unable to complete one full lap. Grant completed one lap in the 1990s car, but gave up on the second after his engine began to stutter and lose power. Kari, using the 2010s car, was able to finish all three laps even though she noted slower-than-normal acceleration. The team used the 2010s car for the performance testing to determine whether moonshine was as effective as a gasoline replacement. They chose three different strengths of moonshine (151, 170 and 192 proof) and planned to do three trials with each strength, calculating the average time to accelerate from 0 to 60 mph (97 km/h). The car would not start on 151 proof, reached an average of 19.4 seconds at 170, and achieved 9 seconds at 192. At Petaluma Speedway, Tory drove 3 laps in this car, clocking times of 2:26 (gasoline) and 2:24 (moonshine). He noted that even though the acceleration was slower on moonshine than gas, the effect gave him better traction on the dirt surface of the track. For the longevity test, they chose to use Thunderhill Raceway Park for the many twists and turns on its track. Grant, in a moonshine-fueled car, drove past Kari and Tory, who were standing by a parked gasoline car; they then jumped in and began chasing him. He was able to stay ahead of them through 3 laps, totaling almost 10 mi (16 km), and the team declared the myth confirmed. However, Kari commented that standard passenger car engines are not designed to run on high-purity ethanol, and that it gives poor gas mileage.

== Episode 210 – "Hollywood Car Crash Cliches" ==
- Original air date: January 18, 2014

Adam, Jamie, and the Build Team explored three scenarios related to vehicle-based movie stunts and effects.

=== Slapstick Shatter ===
Myth	Status	Notes
If a car crashes through a sheet of glass being carried by two men, it can destroy the glass without injuring the men.	Busted	Adam built human analogs from foam rubber covered by plastic sheeting, with red liquid "blood" between the two (to make injuries easy to detect) and supported by plastic tubing. He and Jamie chose three types of glass for testing: tempered, laminated, and ordinary plate glass, each 0.25 inches (6.4 mm) thick. With a sheet of glass held in a vertical frame between two analogs, and using a car with a reinforced windshield to protect themselves, they drove into the glass at 30 miles per hour (48 km/h). The plate glass shattered into shards that inflicted a small number of slash wounds on one analog, while the other one was not injured. The laminated glass broke into several large sheets and did not inflict any injuries; the tempered glass broke into many small fragments that caused multiple injuries to both analogs. Since the workers were at high risk of being wounded by the flying glass, Adam and Jamie classified the myth as busted.

=== SUV vs. RPG ===
Myth	Status	Notes
A sport utility vehicle hit by a rocket-propelled grenade will flip over instead of exploding where it stands.	Busted	The Build Team set up tests at the New Mexico Institute of Mining and Technology, in order to investigate the use of both stationary and moving SUVs. An RPG fired at the front end of a stationary SUV punched into the engine compartment, but the vehicle remained in place and did not flip. For the second test, the team allowed the SUV to roll downhill along a track before firing; the explosion damaged the front end, but the vehicle continued to roll forward without flipping. The team declared the myth busted at this point, and Grant noted that the RPGs they used had been designed to penetrate armor and channel their force to the interior of a vehicle. To achieve an actual flip, they fitted an SUV with a high-pressure nitrogen cannon set to fire upward, as well as several jugs of gasoline rigged to explode. The two effects were synchronized to the impact of a dummy RPG against the front end. The cannon failed to fire on their first attempt but worked on the second, causing the SUV to flip partway backward and then drop back onto all four wheels.

=== Traffic Ram ===
Myth	Status	Notes
A large truck driving at high speed can plow through two lanes of stopped cars and continue forward without stopping.	Busted	Adam and Jamie fitted "the Beast" (the dump truck they had previously used in "JATO 3" and "Crash Cushions") with a heavy reinforced bumper, then set up 10 cars in two parallel lines to simulate a traffic jam. When they drove the Beast into the cars at 40 miles per hour (64 km/h)., they were able to push through four car lengths before coming to a stop among the wreckage. Declaring the myth busted, they decided to modify the Beast so that it could successfully plow through the traffic. They fabricated an attachment similar to a locomotive cowcatcher, in the hope that it would throw the cars aside and out of the Beast's way. For this test, they set up 16 cars instead of 10 and lubricated the attachment's surface with lard; driving at 40 miles per hour (64 km/h), they were able to push all the cars far to each side and continue rolling forward.

== Episode 211 – "Car Chase Chaos / Animal Antics" ==
- Original US air date: January 25, 2014
- Original Australia air date: June 3, 2013

=== Car Chase Chaos ===
Adam and Jamie tested three different movie clichés involving car chases, seeing how they compared to driving normally:

Myth	Status	Notes
The driver and the passenger can work cooperatively to drive the car, with the passenger steering and the driver operating the pedals, while the driver performs another task with his/her hands.	Busted	For all tests, Adam and Jamie set up a closed course on the decommissioned runway at New Jerusalem Airport using the same car. They each drove the course solo to establish an average control time of 62 seconds. When they took turns in each role in the cooperative scenario (with the driver doing nothing but operating the pedals), both runs compared favorably with the control – operating the wheel as the passenger, Adam matched the control while Jamie bettered it by 2 seconds. However, when they added the multitasking element (by having the driver shoot at targets with a paintball gun while operating the pedals), their performance dropped off significantly – Jamie did hit over 50% of the targets, but in a run 15 seconds longer than the control; Adam fared far worse shooting while taking even longer (90 seconds). Due to the drop-off in the multitasking runs, they declared the myth busted, and cooperative driving as much harder than the movies depict it to be.
The driver and the passenger can switch seats while inside the car with the car moving at speed.	Plausible	Before proceeding with the next test, Adam and Jamie cut open the top of the test car to allow for bird's eye camera views. They did one run with Adam as the initial driver and Jamie as the initial passenger, swapping seats twice during the course of the run and completing the run in 63 seconds, only 1 second slower than the control. Declaring the myth plausible, they noted that it would be unreasonable and unsafe to try it in a real-world situation with other cars present.
The passenger can dump an incapacitated driver out of the driver's side door and take control of the car with the car moving at speed.	Plausible	For this test, Adam and Jamie buckled Buster into the driver seat and took turns with the simultaneous action of driving the car (using both steering wheel and pedals) from the passenger seat while trying to dump Buster out of the car through the driver side door, with the other MythBuster riding in the back seat with an extra set of pedals for safety. Jamie struggled with the task, with Buster getting caught in the seat belt multiple times and only finally getting dumped outside in the final moments of the run, which took significantly longer than the control. However, Adam fared much better, quickly dumping Buster after briefly struggling with the driver's side door and completing the run just 2 seconds slower than the control. While noting it was not easy, they declared the myth plausible.

=== Animal Avoidance ===
In an expansion of the myth that flies are repelled by water, the Build Team tested various "at home" methods for repelling various types of animals:

Myth	Status	Notes
Bottles filled with water deter cats.	Busted	The Build Team set up a "cat-friendly" area with a planter box (as a stand-in for a flower bed). They set four adult cats and four kittens in the area and monitored their behavior remotely for one hour; seven of the eight cats went into the planter box at some point. Noting that the cats showed a predilection for high places and the "tower" that had been set up in the area, they decided to expand the test to include the tower as a deterrent zone. Tory and Grant then set small water bottles around the planter box and tower and re-introduced the cats to the environment, but within 15 minutes, the results were the same as the control, with seven of the eight cats venturing into both forbidden areas.
Lion feces deters cats.	Busted	Kari spread the lion feces around the perimeter of the planter box and stacked it in cups on each shelf of the tower. While the cats initially paused for a bit in reaction to the odor, the results eventually matched the control (seven of eight cats in the forbidden areas).
Cat litter and mothballs deter snakes.	Busted	For this test, the Build Team constructed an Indiana Jones-themed set with multiple attracting points for the snakes (the dark areas under and around a Raiders-style altar, heating coils placed underneath the soil floor, and a suitably-dressed Tory sitting down in a corner) on one side. The snakes were released one at a time onto the set for the control, during which 18 of the 21 breeds crossed the set into the forbidden areas. When the cat litter and mothball combo was put in place, the snakes were initially agitated by the odor, but ultimately the same number of snakes (18 of 21) crossed the barriers.
Cayenne pepper deters snakes.	Busted	The cayenne pepper made the snakes hesitate for a bit, but ultimately 17 of 21 snakes (just one less than the control) crossed over into the forbidden areas.
Ammonia-soaked rags deters bears.	Busted	The Build Team placed a minivan with a cooler filled with different types of food in the backseat near a forest enclosure, then set up hot wire around the perimeter of the area to keep the bear (named Baloo) contained, as well as practicing a certain set of behaviors for safety. During the control, Baloo managed to open the large passenger side door and remove the cooler with the food without doing much damage to the minivan; with the ammonia-soaked rags in place, Baloo performed identically (with the exception of entering the minivan via the passenger front side door), showing no signs of being deterred.
Cayenne pepper deters bears.	Confirmed	To the Build Team's astonishment, Baloo was so repulsed by the cayenne pepper that rather than go near the minivan, he found his way through the hot wire and tried to walk off into the woods before being corralled by his handler.

==== Serpent Stop ====
One myth was cut from the initial U.S. airing of the episode and was broadcast on the MythBusters' website:

Myth	Status	Notes
Hemp rope deters snakes.	Busted	While the snakes were slow to get moving, 19 of 21 snakes (more than the control) eventually crossed the hemp rope barriers into the forbidden areas.

==== Foil Cat Deterrent ====
Kari stated during a Twitter Q&A that the myth of cats being repelled by aluminum foil was also recorded, but it was cut from the U.S. airing and to date has not been released on the MythBusters' website. It had, however, been aired in the version of the episode aired in the Asia-Pacific region.

Myth	Status	Notes
Aluminum foil deters cats.	Busted	Despite the planter's box being completely covered in foil, all eight cats entered the planter's box at least once.

== Episode 212 – "*DO* Try This at Home?" ==
- Original air date: February 1, 2014

Adam, Jamie, and the Build Team explored eight short myths to determine both their accuracy and the ease with which viewers might be able to test them at home.

=== Microwave Water ===
Myth	Status	Try at home?	Notes
Water boiled in a microwave oven will kill plants.	Busted	Do	Adam built a tray to hold four pairs of romaine lettuce plants, each receiving a different type of water: microwave-boiled, stove-boiled, unheated from the tap, and no water at all. The two boiled water samples were cooled to room temperature before being used. All plants received the same amounts of water and light (provided by controlled grow lights) for one week. At the end of this time, Adam found that the plants given microwave-boiled water had grown larger than all the others, and that the ones given no water had died. He noted that testing this myth posed no safety hazards.

=== Extreme Extinguishing ===
Myth	Status	Try at home?	Notes
The wake from a sharply turning jet boat can put out a fire on a stationary one. Based on a viral video.	Confirmed	Don't	The Build Team borrowed a jet boat, and Tory practiced getting it up to speed and doing a sharp 180-degree turn. They loaded a wooden pallet of hay onto a second, stationary boat and set it on fire. With Grant and the boat's owner on board, Tory drove toward the burning boat at 50 miles per hour (80 km/h) and cut a sharp turn. The first pass put out the flames, but smoke was still billowing from the hay; after two more passes, the smoke had been greatly reduced. Although the team judged the myth as confirmed, they noted that the circumstances made it impractical to try at home.

=== N-Sync ===
Myth	Status	Try at home?	Notes
A large number of metronomes set to the same tempo will eventually fall into perfect rhythm. Based on several viral videos.	Busted	Do	Adam observed that the videos often showed the metronomes on a platform, and theorized that vibrations caused by their ticking could eventually cause them to synchronize. He set a piece of metal plate on top of two lengths of pipe to act as rollers, and was able to get 2, 5, and 11 metronomes placed on it to tick in rhythm with occasional minor adjustments to individual tempos. He and Jamie then set up 216 metronomes on an air hockey table, which was turned on to reduce friction and help transmit vibrations from one to another. Groups fell into and out of phase during 30 minutes of ticking; Adam commented that variations in manufacturing tolerances would make it nearly impossible to synchronize a large number of metronomes.

=== Chain Reaction ===
Myth	Status	Try at home?	Notes
Chrome ball-chain can appear to levitate briefly as it falls out of a container.	Confirmed	Do	Jamie placed a beaker filled with one long piece of chain on a counter and pulled one end sharply up over the edge to start it falling. High-speed camera footage revealed that the balls did follow the arc of that initial pull, and tests with larger balls and from greater heights increased the effect. He explained that the effect may have been due to the combination of inertia from the pull, the chain's own weight, and the low friction due to the balls' slick surface. This segment also featured a YouTube video that shows the effect.

=== Elephant Toothpaste ===
Myth	Status	Try at home?	Notes
An investigation of the classroom science experiment known as "elephant toothpaste."	—N/a	Do (1st version) / Don't (2nd/3rd versions)	Kari mixed household hydrogen peroxide solution, liquid dish soap, and food coloring in a graduated cylinder, then added a small amount of yeast. The peroxide decomposed into water and oxygen gas, and the latter caused the soap to foam up and out of the container. This version was judged safe for home testing. Kari repeated the experiment, using a concentrated laboratory-grade peroxide solution and potassium iodide instead of yeast. This test generated a large volume of hot foam and steam, and was deemed unsafe for the home. In a final test, dubbed "Monster Toothpaste", the Build Team scaled up the recipe by a factor of 200. When the chemicals were mixed, they generated a massive eruption of foam.

=== Exploding Snake ===
Myth	Status	Try at home?	Notes
Attempts to carry out a chemical reaction whose results resemble a black snake firework, but occurring much more quickly.	—N/a	Don't	Grant first mixed sugar and sulfuric acid. The sugar decomposed to form steam and carbon residue, but the reaction did not appear to be particularly fast or violent. When he switched the sugar for an unnamed organic compound and heated the mixture for several seconds, it generated an instantaneous burst of smoke and a tall column of carbon. He stressed that the use of sulfuric acid made the test highly dangerous.

=== Soda Bomb Safety ===
Myth	Status	Try at home?	Notes
A determination of the dangers involved in using a dry ice bomb.	—N/a	Don't	Adam set up a rig to screw caps onto bottles using a power drill. At the bomb range, he placed a bottle in a frame and added dry ice and water, with pressure sensors arranged around it, then retreated to a safe distance and triggered the drill to put on the cap. The explosion of a 350 mL (12 imp fl oz; 12 US fl oz) bottle registered a maximum pressure of 3 pounds per square inch (21 kPa); however, Adam and Jamie found that one of the frame's steel supports had fractured and bent. A 2 L (70 imp fl oz; 68 US fl oz) bottle bulged out greatly before exploding and gave a maximum of 7 pounds per square inch (48 kPa), enough to cause permanent hearing damage. When Adam and Jamie repeated the test with the bottle held in a set of rubber/bone forearms made by Jamie, the blast inflicted several lacerations, fractures, and wounds from embedded shrapnel.

=== Water Tricks ===
Myth	Status	Try at home?	Notes
Water falling in front of a stereo speaker can appear to freeze in place.	Confirmed	Do	Tory set up a pipe to dribble water in front of a speaker and filmed the setup with a video camera, adjusting the output frequency to affect the vibration of the water in midair. Near 24 Hertz, the water seemed to fall very slowly; Tory pointed out that the effect was an optical illusion, caused by the vibration being nearly synchronized with the camera's filming rate of 24 frames per second. At frequencies below 24 Hertz, the effect made the water appear to rise back toward the pipe when the recording was played back.

== Episode 213 – "Mythssion Impossible" ==
- Original air date: February 15, 2014

=== Herding Cats ===
Myth	Status	Notes
It is impossible to herd cats.	Confirmed	Adam and Jamie visited a livestock farm to learn about the basics of animal herding. They were each able to guide a flock of six sheep along a course laid out in one of the pens, but noted that sheep's natural instincts cause them to move in groups, while cats do not possess such a herding tendency. At an indoor facility, they set up a small enclosure (the "Cat Corral") and tried to move 8 cats into it, but neither man could get them to move as a group. Adam resorted to carrying them one by one, only to have a cat escape as he brought the last one in; Jamie worked by intimidating them, but could only move 5 into the Cat Corral. Further attempts, using only 3 cats and a combination of toys, catnip, and startling noises/movements, also failed. A final test, with all 8 cats and a sheepdog, failed when the cats became aggressive and refused to move away from the dog's advance.

=== Greased Pig ===
Myth	Status	Notes
It is impossible to catch a greased pig.	Busted	At a pig farm, the Build Team applied grease to several pigs and each member took a turn trying to catch one and move it into an 8-foot (2.4 m) diameter circle at the center of the pen. Kari completed the task in 55 seconds with a 25-pound (11 kg) pig, Grant in 2 minutes with one weighing 40 pounds (18 kg), and Tory in just under 5 minutes with a 150-pound (68 kg) pig. The team declared the myth busted at this point, then started to design portable devices that could safely pick up and move the pigs. Kari formulated a feed mixture to use as bait and made a pair of fur-lined gloves to improve her grip; the pig ignored the bait, but she was able to easily grab and move the pig in 24 seconds. Grant's device, consisting of long-handled pincers operated by a compressed-air tank on his back, proved unwieldy and difficult to aim; he took nearly 4 minutes to complete the task. Tory attached two suction cups to a vacuum-cleaner backpack, but was unable to get a strong enough grip to hold on to the pig within 5 minutes.

=== Full of Cr*p ===
Myth	Status	Notes
It is impossible to fit 10 pounds of feces into a 5-pound bag.	Confirmed	Adam weighed out 5 pounds (2.3 kg) of horse manure and sewed together a bag to hold that amount, while Jamie built a rig to compress the material, adding a long handle to an engine hoist for extra leverage. They were able to squeeze a large amount of water out of the manure and reduce it to nearly half its original volume. Through a combination of compression and manual adjustments, they were able to squeeze a 10-pound (4.5 kg) charge of manure into Adam's bag and close it. However, the compressed material only weighed 7.5 pounds (3.4 kg), indicating that 2.5 pounds (1.1 kg) of water had been removed. Jamie considered this result to be in support of the myth, since the bag's contents no longer weighed 10 pounds.

== Episode 214 – "Bullet Baloney" ==
- Original air date: February 22, 2014

The MythBusters take on a series of filmic firearm cliches as follows:

=== Bent Barrel ===
Myth	Status	Notes
A rifle with a bent barrel will still fire with lethal velocity.	Confirmed	Adam and Jamie set up a test range at the Yolo County bomb range and used a sword forge to heat the barrels so they could be bent for each test by hand. A control with an unmodified barrel saw the rifle fire with a muzzle velocity of 1,216 ft/s (371 m/s) and fully penetrate a block of ballistics gel; subsequent tests with barrels bent to 45, 90, 135 and 180-degree angles all saw the rifle fire successfully, with all bullets fully penetrating the ballistics gel and at a lethal muzzle velocity (the worst being the 180-degree angle at 975 ft/s (297 m/s)). They declared the myth confirmed while noting that the bullets began to tumble as soon as a bend was introduced, implying that a rifle with a bent barrel may only be accurate at close range.

=== What is Bulletproof? (v.6) ===
Using a mock-up of a carnival-style shooting gallery, the Build Team tested the effectiveness of some everyday items at stopping bullets, including:

Myth statement	Status	Notes
A tape measure	Busted	The tape measure stopped .22 and 9mm rounds, but was penetrated by a .40-caliber round.
A golf ball	Busted	.22 rounds fully penetrated the golf ball. (This test was cut from the original U.S. episode airing, but did air in U.S. re-runs.)
A wallet	Busted	9mm rounds fully penetrated a leather wallet filled normally (a mix of cash and credit cards), a duct-tape wallet filled normally, and a leather wallet overstuffed with cash.

=== Shotgun Spear ===
Myth	Status	Notes
If a wooden spear with a shotgun shell attached to its tip is used to strike an attacking wolf, the shell will detonate and injure the animal. Based on a scene in the film The Grey.	Busted	The Build Team set up an analog of a wolf behind bullet-resistant plastic for testing. A first test using a hand-sharpened tree branch failed to set off the shotgun shell. A second test using a shop-made spear of Ipê wood (a material harder (80 HB) than the brass primer (60 HB) of the shell on the Brinell scale) also failed despite the primer of the round becoming dented. The third test, working under the assumption that the film's survivors found a metal screw to use as a firing pin, finally got the shell to go off, but caused no damage to the wolf analog as there was no barrel to contain and direct the pellets. The team declared the myth busted owing to the lack of injury, and pointed out that attacking the wolf with the sharpened stick alone would be just as effective.

=== Gun in a Vacuum ===
Myth	Status	Notes
It is impossible to fire a gun in a vacuum, either because the lack of atmospheric pressure will cause bullets to deform, or because the primer will fail to go off in an environment absent of oxygen.	Busted	Adam and Jamie placed a revolver with a remote-firing mechanism in a vacuum chamber made from bullet-resistant plastic with a steel-plate backing. Two test shots (a control under normal conditions and a test with the chamber fully evacuated) saw the gun fire successfully, with high-speed-camera footage and a measurement of the width of the imprint of the bullets on the back panel of the chamber confirming that normal atmosphere slowed the speed of the bullet by 5%. They also observed that the fireball caused by the gun firing was much larger in the vacuum (owing to the lack of air allowing the gases to expand more), causing Jamie to speculate that outer space explosions would be much more massive than their atmospheric counterparts.

Adam explained the reason for the second justification of the myth not being true on Twitter, stating that the accelerant in a bullet contains an oxygenator, thus rendering oxygen from the air unnecessary.

=== Neon Nightmare ===
Myth	Status	Notes
A neon sign will explode in a shower of sparks if struck by a bullet.	Busted	The Build Team carried out testing at the gun range using neon signs specifically constructed for the test by Kari with some expert help. Both 9mm rounds and shotgun shells simply put out the signs when hit, not causing any sparks. Declaring the myth busted at this point, they attempted replicating the results using signs filled with hydrogen instead of neon and using high-voltage arc discharges to light them, but this last effort also failed to generate any sparks.

=== Deep Fried Firearm ===
Myth	Status	Notes
A gun that is dropped into a deep fryer of hot oil will discharge on its own.	Confirmed	At the bomb range, Adam and Jamie set up a container with a heater to bring cooking oil up to temperature and attached a mechanism to lower a 9mm pistol into it. Once the oil reached an average frying temperature (about 390 °F (199 °C)), they turned off the heat and immersed the pistol. The gun eventually discharged after a delay of about three and a half minutes. Declaring the myth confirmed, they reset the equipment with unheated oil for a second test to see what the minimum temperature to set off the gun was; the weapon fired once the temperature reached 344 °F (173 °C).

== Episode 215 – "Supersonic Ping Pong/Ice Cannon" ==
- Original air date: March 1, 2014

=== Killer Ping Pong Ball ===
Myth	Status	Notes
A ping-pong ball moving at a high enough speed can inflict a lethal injury.	Busted	Adam and Jamie began by hitting balls by hand with a paddle and achieved a maximum speed of 75 mph (121 km/h). Adam built a compressed-air launcher and got the ball up to 140 mph (230 km/h) at a pressure of 95 psi (660 kPa). Jamie commented that a longer barrel would allow more time for the air pressure to accelerate the ball. Using an 80 ft (24 m) barrel and a pressure of 140 psi (970 kPa), they reached 453 mph (729 km/h)—fast enough to punch through the target board and leave a mark on its plywood backstop. Adam researched a method for accelerating the ball by placing it in a sealed tube, evacuating all the air, and puncturing the seal on the end behind the ball. Using a 3 ft (91 cm) tube, he found that the ball burst out the other end in excess of 300 mph (480 km/h). Increased lengths led to a higher top speed within the barrel, but caused the ball to slow down before leaving the barrel due to resistance from the air accumulating in front of the ball. However, Adam learned of a modification that involved adding a choke chamber to the far end in order to pop the seal and give the ball an extra burst of speed. With the choke in place, he and Jamie measured a speed of 779 mph (1,254 km/h) out of the barrel. In a hangar at Fort Mason, they set up their vacuum launcher with a 150 ft (46 m) barrel and a 500 psi (3,400 kPa) air supply. Their first launch measured 1,086 mph (1,748 km/h), but the ball broke into fragments before it left the barrel; a second test, at 20 ft (6.1 m) length and 300 psi (2,100 kPa), gave 1,100 mph (1,770 km/h), left the ball intact, and allowed it to smash a hole through a ping-pong paddle. For a test of lethal potential, they fired at a slab of pork, which fell off its support hook on impact and was found to have a 1.5 in (3.8 cm) deep hole. They classified the myth as busted, noting that the wound would be serious but not fatal.

=== Ice Cannon ===
Myth	Status	Notes
A cannon and cannonballs made of ice can be successfully fired and inflict lethal damage on a target. Based on claims that an army in 18th-century Russia used such a weapon to defend itself.	Busted	The Build Team crafted ice cannonballs with four different reinforcements mixed in: none, hemp fiber, sawdust, and paper fiber. They loaded the un-reinforced ball into a Civil War-era cannon with 8 oz (230 g) of black powder and fired it at a target dummy; the ball remained intact, achieving a speed of 684 mph (1,101 km/h) and scoring a knockdown. A test with 24 oz (680 g) of powder, the largest charge the cannon could take, also left the ball intact and gave a top speed of 1,550 mph (2,490 km/h). They chose to use the un-reinforced balls for all further testing. Tory built three cannon breeches out of ice, with different wall thicknesses for strength testing. When the team loaded the 8 in (20 cm) thick breech with 8 oz (230 g) of powder and set it off, the blast destroyed the breech; subsequent tests with charges up to 1.75 oz (50 g) left the breech intact, though. They then built a complete cannon and set up targets at 150 yards (140 m) in order to evaluate three criteria: range, damage potential, and reusability. Their first shot reached a speed of 200 mph (320 km/h) and covered the distance to the target zone, but did not hit any targets. A second test, with the angle adjusted to fire over the targets' heads, caused the cannon to shatter. The team judged the myth as busted, since the cannon had met only the first two of their three criteria.

== Episode 216 – "Fire in the Hole" ==
- Original air date: July 10, 2014

An examination of Hollywood movie scenarios involving explosions.

=== Grenade Shoot ===
Myth	Status	Notes
It is possible to shoot a thrown grenade in midair and set it off, render it harmless, or redirect it back toward the thrower.	Plausible	Adam and Jamie first met with a professional trap shooting instructor to learn the basics of hitting moving airborne targets. After practicing on clay pigeons, they returned to the workshop, where Jamie re-configured his soda-can launcher to launch paintball grenades. At the shooting range, they were both able to hit the grenades using 12-gauge birdshot rounds. To better match typical movie scenarios, in which a character might fire a pistol to hit a grenade, they switched to steel dummy grenades and paintball pistols for safety. Each man took a turn shooting while the other threw and was able to score a hit after repeated misses. For testing of live ammunition and explosives, they built a heavily armored bunker on a remote stretch of land and set off the grenades and firearms remotely. A test on a standard grenade showed that the explosion would occur 5 seconds after the fuse was ignited by the spoon popping off. They set up a shotgun, pistol, and rifle to fire directly at a grenade once its fuse had been ignited. The 12-gauge buckshot round blew it to pieces and extinguished the blasting cap. The .45 pistol round knocked the cap off; it exploded harmlessly. The .308 rifle round delivered enough energy to the grenade to detonate its explosives instantly. Adam and Jamie classified the myth as plausible, but noted that a person would have a better chance of survival by taking cover due to the difficulty of making an accurate shot and the risk of setting the grenade off.

=== Seconds from Disaster ===
The Build Team investigated the possibility of surviving a bomb explosion by placing the device in a container and diving out of the way. They first set up a 1-pound (450 g) charge of C-4 at the bomb range and detonated it as a control test, with rupture discs placed at distances of up to 20 feet (6.1 m). These discs were calibrated to burst at 13 pounds per square inch (90 kPa), the threshold of shock wave injuries; the disc at 12 feet (3.7 m) was the farthest one that burst.

For each test, they placed the charge in the enclosure, with a disc and several Styrofoam cutout figures (to gauge shrapnel injuries) at a distance of 12 feet (3.7 m). They tested...

Item	Status	Notes
...a full filing cabinet.	Busted	With the charge inside a closed drawer, the cabinet was destroyed; the disc did not burst, but the cutouts were shredded.
...a bed.	Plausible	The charge was stuffed under the mattress, which was thrown upward by the blast; the disc and cutouts were left intact.
...an aquarium full of water.	Plausible	The charge was placed inside the tank, and the explosion was directed forward and backward; the disc and cutouts, off to one side, were unharmed.
...a garbage truck.	Plausible	The charge was placed inside the rear hopper, and disc/cutout groups were placed both directly behind the truck and off to one side. The "behind" disc and cutout were destroyed, while the "side" set remained intact. The Build Team later decided to blow up the truck for fun, filling it with several pounds of ANFO similarly to the iconic Cement Truck explosion from 2005's Salsa Escape.

==== Out-of-Control Test ====
Outtakes of out-of-control tests from the Seconds from Disaster myth were published on the Discovery Channel website. Additionally, they tested...

Item	Status	Notes
...an unenclosed control, with C4 on wooden decking.	—N/a	The decking was completely destroyed, with the Build Team concluding they should dial the experiment down.
...an empty filing cabinet.	—N/a	The cabinet was completely destroyed and deemed to have produced too much shrapnel.
...a steel wall safe built into a wall.	Busted	The half inch thick steel safe and the wall were both completely destroyed. The cutouts were shredded.

The overall conclusion was that the best approach was to place the bomb somewhere that would redirect the explosion, then move away from where the blast was going to go. Attempting to fully contain an explosion would create deadly shrapnel that would kill anyone nearby. The team finished by blowing up the truck with 200 pounds (91 kg) of ANFO.

== Episode 217 – "Household Disasters" ==
- Original US air date: July 17, 2014
- Original Australia air date: May 26, 2014

Myth	Status	Notes
Certain types of sunscreen can make a human body susceptible to catching fire.	Plausible	Adam began by spraying/squirting various types of sunscreen into a lighter flame to see if they would ignite. The cream formulations failed to do so, but the spray-on products did ignite due to their highly flammable propellants (butane and propane). For their next test, they set up a mannequin next to a barbecue grill and sprayed it with sunscreen once the grill was hot. One spray caused an arm to briefly catch fire. Replacing the mannequin with a pig carcass, they investigated the possibility that the sunscreen could ignite even well after it had been sprayed on, due to the presence of flammable solvents. With the grill lid closed, they sprayed the carcass, waited a certain length of time, then opened the lid to expose it to the flames. Delays of 3 minutes and 1 minute gave no results, but a delay of 5 seconds did cause the carcass to catch fire. They judged the myth plausible, and Jamie commented that spray-on sunscreen could ignite in the short time before the solvents evaporated.

=== Piano Pile-Up ===
Myth	Status	Notes
A piano dropped onto a house will smash cleanly through both the roof and the floor.	Busted	The Build Team found a one-story house slated for demolition, marked several target points on the roof between joists, and used a construction crane to hoist and drop various pianos from a height of 50 feet (15 m) above the roof. An upright piano weighing 700 pounds (320 kg) damaged the roof but bounced off without penetrating. A baby grand piano weighing 1,400 pounds (640 kg) pierced its legs through the roof but was unable to fully break through. Calling the myth busted, the team loaded another upright piano with enough sand to reach a total weight of 2,600 pounds (1,200 kg), much more than a full-size grand piano, then dropped it from 75 feet (23 m) above the roof. This time, the piano did smash a hole in the roof and landed on the floor.

=== That Sucks ===
Myth	Status	Notes
A vacuum cleaner can explode if it is used to clean up black powder.	Busted	At the bomb range, the Build Team set up a carpeted floor and set up 7 vacuums of different types to suck up 1 pound (450 g) of black powder. None of them exploded after 60 seconds, prompting the team to declare the myth busted; they then used the powder to blow up one of the vacuums. See also Jet Engine Vacuum.

=== Water Heater Fire Extinguisher ===
Myth	Status	Notes
If a faulty water heater explodes due to pressure buildup, it can put out a nearby fire.	Busted	Adam and Jamie disabled the safety features on a water heater and connected to a high-wattage external power source and a pressurized scuba tank, so that they could trigger it to explode on command. A test run spread water in a 25-foot (7.6 m) radius when the heater blew. They then built a one-story house with typical flammable furnishings, including the heater and an ignition system in a trash can. With the power on and the pressure inside the heater rising, they started the fire, which began to spread quickly. At 300 pounds per square inch (2,100 kPa), they set off the heater, causing an explosion that tore the house apart; most of the fire was extinguished, but they did find some areas that were still burning. As a result, they classified the myth as busted.

=== Dog Bowl Ignition ===
This myth was not aired in the U.S.

Myth	Status	Notes
A dog bowl can focus the sun's rays at a small enough point to start a fire due to it being very hot.	Confirmed	The Build Team set up a table on a wooden deck outside on a sunny day, made to look like a picnic, and put out highly flammable objects to improve their chances. This included dried flowers, decaying wood, and paper. They set two types of dog bowls, metal and glass, in various sizes to focus the sun's rays. Due to high humidity and wind, they used a theatrical light to warm up the set, replicating ideal conditions of the summer. The temperature of the set was 105 °F (41 °C), with 12% humidity. After two minutes, the glass bowls started a fire on the set. Although ideal conditions are required, the myth was still confirmed.

=== Sunburn vs Burn-Burn ===
This myth was cut out of the episode but included online.

Myth	Status	Notes
Putting on sunscreen near a candle can burn you.	Busted	Adam tests out if a candle can ignite sunscreen when applying it. He sprays it on a mannequin next to a lit candle. It does not work, only providing brief flames that do not start the mannequin on fire. Adam then sprays it through the fire, starting the mannequin on fire, which is unrealistic, and then therefore busted the myth.

== Episode 218 – "Commercial Myths" ==
- Original US air date: July 24, 2014
- Original Australia air date: May 19, 2014

=== Apple Bobbing Bungee ===
Myth	Status	Notes
It is possible to do a bungee jump from a height of 100 feet (30 m) and safely snatch an apple in one's teeth from a barrel of water on the ground.	Busted	Adam and Jamie chose three criteria for their investigation: jumping safely to reach the barrel without hitting its bottom, being able to reach the barrel accurately, and ability to bite and hold the apple. They set up a 100-foot (30 m) construction crane at a swimming pool and built "Bungee Buster", a dummy rigid enough to hold a correct falling posture and heavy enough to match Jamie's weight. By fine-tuning the bungee cord, they were able to drop Buster so that he consistently penetrated only a few inches below the water surface. Jamie then took Buster's place for a second series of jumps so that the cord could be re-calibrated for his weight. For the accuracy test, a large plastic hoop was placed in the pool; both men were able to put their heads inside it repeatedly. Finally, they placed several foam rubber apples inside the hoop, and Jamie made several jumps in an attempt to bite into them. The changing wind caused him to miss the target at first, but even after the target was re-positioned, he was still unable to bring back any apples because the ripples created by his impact pushed them out of the way. He and Adam declared the myth busted at this point, but decided to build a device that would allow them to accomplish the feat. At the workshop, they devised a head harness with a set of mechanical jaws that operated when the wearer opened his mouth. Suspended upside down over a tub full of water and real apples, Jamie was able to snag them with this rig; at the pool, he missed the apples, but snagged the hoop on his last try.

=== Tennis Take Off ===
Tory, Grant and Kari examine a myth that comes from a HEAD Tennis commercial that features Novak Djokovic rallying with a partner while the two are anchored to the wings of an airplane in flight.

Myth	Status	Notes
It is possible to play tennis on the wings of an airplane in flight.	Confirmed	The Build Team researched the plane shown in the commercial on which this myth was based and found that it could fly at speeds as low as 35 miles per hour (56 km/h). They took some lessons from the head tennis coach at the University of California, Berkeley, both in calm air and with a giant fan producing winds to match the plane's minimum speed. The wind affected the flight path of the ball, but they were able to adjust their technique to compensate. After the show's insurance company rejected the team's plan to do their testing on a flying plane, they decided to build a set of wings, mount them on a truck's flatbed trailer, and drive it down a runway at 35 miles per hour (56 km/h). Grant's final design had a wingspan of 40 feet (12 m), and he and Tory set out to volley the ball 5 times at speed while standing on opposite ends, with Kari driving. After several failed attempts, professional tennis player Tyler Browne took Grant's place, and he and Tory were soon able to achieve volleys of up to 12 hits. The team declared the myth confirmed, then repeated the test with Tyler and Tory standing 32 feet (9.8 m) apart, farther than their first trials. Although the increased vibrations affected their playing, they did soon attain 5 or more hits.

== Episode 219 – "Road Rage" ==
- Original US air date: July 31, 2014
- Original Australia air date: May 12, 2014

This episode is alternatively called "Silver Screen Car Chaos", as mentioned in the opening sequences, and "Driving This Crazy", for when it aired in Australia. Various car chase stereotypes from movies are tested.

=== Cliff Top Push Off ===
Myth	Status	Notes
During a car chase, it is very difficult for the pursuing driver to use his car to push his target off the road.	Busted	Adam and Jamie set up a theoretical chase course at Naval Air Station Alameda and began their testing with two cars of equal size. Each man was able to push the other off the road easily during three duels, with two successes for Jamie and one for Adam. Next, they chose cars of unequal weights, a 5,000-pound (2,300 kg) car for Adam and an 8,000-pound (3,600 kg) SUV for Jamie. Using conventional driving methods, Jamie easily pushed Adam off the road, while Adam could not significantly affect Jamie's path. However, when Adam used a PIT maneuver, he was able to cause Jamie to spin out. Since all the vehicles they tested could be readily incapacitated, they classified the myth as busted.

=== Wanted Car Flip ===
Myth	Status	Notes
A Chevrolet Corvette can act as a ramp, enabling a Ford Mustang to do a barrel roll in the air, and both cars can drive away without any issues, as in a stunt from the movie Wanted.	Busted	At Naval Air Station Alameda, the Build Team filmed high-speed footage of cars similar to those used in the movie to determine how braking and acceleration affected the height of their bumpers. They found that the Corvette's bumper lowered by three inches and the Mustang's rose by four inches. After modifying the cars' suspensions to make those effects permanent, they rigged a pulley system on the runway to collide them at high speed. On their first attempt, the Corvette broke free of its guide cable and the Mustang rolled off the runway and crashed through a nearby fence. On their second attempt, the cars collided and were both destroyed without replicating the movie stunt. The team then modified another pair of cars to have an even greater difference in bumper height, and reran the test. Again, both cars were destroyed by the collision, but Tory pointed out that the wreckage of the Mustang did do a barrel roll. Having busted the original myth, the team decided to replicate the result by adding a reinforced ramp to the front of the Corvette. This time, when starting up the pulley system, the Mustang's guide cable quickly snapped and the car rolled to a stop. A successful re-test did lead to the Mustang being launched into the air intact, but it landed upside down and the Corvette was heavily damaged. The team declared the myth busted.

=== Two Wheel Wipe Out ===
Myth	Status	Notes
A novice driver can tip a car sideways onto two wheels and maintain balance with ease without crashing or falling back down, similar to some Hollywood films.	Busted	Adam and Jamie built a ramp at the Alameda runway and used it to launch a car onto two wheels. After several hours of trying, they could not control its course or maintain the position for more than a few seconds. At this point, they called in veteran stunt driver James Smith for some lessons on tilted driving. They had more success under his supervision, but Jamie suffered a whiplash injury and Adam flipped the car over. Declaring the myth busted, they noted that two-wheel driving is possible but can only be done safely after extensive training.

== Episode 220 – "Laws of Attraction" ==
- Original air date: August 7, 2014

Myth	Status	Notes
A person's intelligence deteriorates in the presence of members of the opposite gender.	Busted	Adam designed a test in which the subject would have to identify the colors in which words were displayed on a screen as quickly as possible, while Jamie built a testing room on a commercial film stage. Five men and five women took the test twice, first with a member of the same gender sitting nearby in the room as a control run, then with a member of the opposite gender. On their first run, the men achieved an average of 56.8 seconds, while the women averaged 50.2. However, the second run gave an average of 46.8 seconds for both groups, indicating an overall improvement in performance and leading Adam and Jamie to call the myth busted.
Men are more strongly attracted to blonde women than those of other hair colors.	Busted	Adam and Jamie set up a speed-dating scenario in which 9 men spoke to each of 9 women for 3 minutes, then rated them on a numerical scale. The test was repeated three times, with a different group of men each time; the women used wigs to pass themselves off as blondes, brunettes, or redheads, changing them after each test so that every woman had all three hair colors. Adam and Jamie found no significant differences among the groups in any test, so they judged the myth to be busted.
Pheromone sprays can increase a person's attractiveness toward the opposite gender.	Busted	Adam built a turntable with 10 airtight chambers, each holding a T-shirt treated with some combination of pheromone and/or sweat from either Adam or Jamie. A clean, unused shirt was also included as a control. One at a time, 50 women smelled every shirt and then voted for their favorite scent of the group. The shirt bearing both the pheromones and Adam's sweat proved the most popular, with 38% of the votes, but others either expressed a strong dislike of that smell or chose the control shirt. As a result, Adam and Jamie declared the myth busted.

=== Storm in a D-Cup ===
Myth	Status	Notes
In the service industry, women with larger breasts tend to receive higher tips.	Confirmed	Kari volunteered to work in a coffee shop, disguising her appearance with a wig and makeup and using three different bust sizes: "small" (taped down to achieve a reduction of two cup sizes), "medium" (no alteration), and "large" (DDD size). Grant and Tory watched her through hidden cameras and gave her a tip jar rigged to separate tips given by men from those given by women. They focused on the tips Kari collected from the first 80 male customers on each shift. During the "small" and "medium" shifts, she collected $72 in tips, while the "large" shift yielded $98, with both men and women tipping almost 40% more. The team classified the myth as confirmed.

=== Money Talk$ ===
Myth	Status	Notes
Women are more attracted to financially successful men.	Confirmed	The Build Team invited a group of 250 women to the Roxy Theater in San Francisco and showed them pictures of 12 men, with names, locations, and actual occupations. The women rated each man on a 1–10 scale, after which the team presented the same pictures again, but with more lucrative occupations shown for half of the men. In the first test, the men earned an average rating of 56 out of 120, while the men with changed occupations earned 68 out of 120 in the second.

== Episode 221 – "Traffic Tricks" ==
- Original US air date: August 7, 2014
- Original Australia air date: July 22, 2013

Myth	Status	Notes
When one car brakes, it can cause a ripple effect that propagates behind it long after the initial cause has moved on.	Confirmed	Adam and Jamie set up a circular course to create experimental traffic at the Alameda runway. With a light traffic situation of ten cars, ripples were observed when Jamie hit his brakes, but these ripples quickly dissipated. A heavier traffic situation of twenty cars (which was very close to the saturation point of the course at the test speed of 20 miles per hour (32 km/h)) allowed the ripples to propagate around the test course multiple times, confirming the myth.
For journeys shorter than 400 miles, driving is faster than flying.	Plausible	The Build Team had a race of 380 miles (610 km) from San Francisco to Los Angeles, between Tory on a plane, and Kari and Grant driving. The bottlenecks of air travel—arriving early to get through security, waiting for the plane to start boarding, retrieving luggage at the destination, and then renting a car—delayed Tory significantly. Kari and Grant had fewer such delays, but did have to stop for gas and food at one point, and traffic in and near the larger cities did slow them down. Kari and Grant arrived at their destination after 5h 33m; Tory was slightly faster, at 5h 25m. Because of the close result (which, thanks to various delays that were experienced by both drivers, was well within their margin of error), and this myth being tested at close to a worst-case scenario, it was declared plausible.

=== Lane Weave ===
Myth	Status	Notes
Whether a driver stays in the same lane or constantly changes lanes, the total time for a car trip is not affected.	Busted	To test this myth, the Build Team had a race on the freeway between the M7 workshop in San Francisco and the San Jose Tech Museum during the morning rush hour. Kari, in the weaving car, managed to open up only a minute and a half lead over Tory in the fixed-lane car before the traffic cleared, resulting in only a 2% difference in travel time. They tried again with a more extreme traffic condition, the route (Interstate 580) picked out via advice from Caltrans’s Bay Area Traffic Management Center. This time, it was Grant driving the weaving car, and Tory in the fixed-lane car. Once again, the time difference was small, with a difference of only two minutes over two hours of travel time—again, a difference of about 2%. One last test along I-580, with four major lanes covered by staff members (including Grant) and Tory in the weaving car, finally showed significant differences between the weaving car and the other cars, busting the myth (times posted below). However, the Build Team pointed out that the obvious stress on the drivers of the weaving car meant that the stress was not worth the time gained by weaving.: Car X (Tory, weaving): 1 hour, 16 minutes; Car 1 (Grant, leftmost lane): 1 hour, 19 minutes (4% difference); Car 2 (left-central lane): 1 hour, 20 minutes (5% difference); Car 3 (right-central lane): 1 hour, 29 minutes (17% difference); Car 4 (rightmost lane): 1 hour, 33 minutes (22% difference)

=== Crossroads Conundrum ===
Myth	Status	Notes
A roundabout is a far more effective way to move cars through an intersection than the four-way stop signs used in the US.	Confirmed	At the Alameda runway, Adam and Jamie first marked out both a four-way intersection using traffic barriers. Over two tests, fifteen minutes each, the intersection allowed an average of 385 cars to pass through. They then changed the intersection to a roundabout, and after allowing the drivers some practice to get used to navigating the roundabout (as they are not common in the United States), ran the test again. The roundabout allowed multiple cars to be in the intersection at a time, allowing a total of 460 cars through in fifteen minutes—a significant 20% improvement over the four-way stop. As a side myth, the test was also run on the four-way intersection with Jamie as a traffic cop, but fewer than 300 cars made it through the intersection in the fifteen-minute test time.

== Episode 222 – "Plane Boarding" ==
- Original US air date: August 21, 2014
- Original Australia air date: September 12, 2012

The final US episode premiere to feature the Build Team of Kari Byron, Tory Belleci, and Grant Imahara.

=== Plane Boarding ===
The episode decided to use a myth on plane boarding; this was because of waiting time being the biggest complaint from flyers everywhere.

Myth statement	Status	Notes
The standard back-to-front airplane boarding system is really the slowest.	Confirmed	At a boat storage facility in Mare Island Naval Shipyard, Adam and Jamie built a replica of a typical passenger airplane cabin and airport departure gate and enlisted enough volunteers to fill all the seats. Each passenger was assigned a seat, and Adam and a team of flight attendants assisted them in boarding and stowing their luggage. In each test, a small percentage of the passengers were secretly instructed to act in typical ways that tend to slow down boarding. Business class passengers and families with small children were always allowed to board first. Jamie measured the total time needed to seat all the passengers and stow their luggage, and they rated each boarding system as "Great" (+1 point), "Okay" (0 points), or "Terrible" (-1 point). Alternatives were compared against the standard back-to-front system in terms of time and total rating points. The systems with an "outside-in" component (WILMA, WILMA Block, Reverse Pyramid) proved to be the most popular and were nearly 10 minutes faster than back-to-front, filling the seats furthest from the aisle first. The two random systems, both with and without assigned seats, were faster than back-to-front but were also the least popular.

The following are the results of the experiment.

Boarding Method	Completion Time (min:sec)	Customer Satisfaction Score	Notes
Back-to-Front	24:29	19	Confirmed as the slowest, with the third lowest satisfaction score.
Random, with assigned seats	17:15	12	While faster than the current system, the satisfaction score was worse.
WILMA (WIndow, Middle, Aisle; all rows board in that order)	14:55	102	Significantly faster and more satisfactory than back-to-front.
WILMA Block (cabin split into four zones; each zone follows the WILMA pattern)	15:07	105	Also faster and more satisfactory than back-to-front.
Random, no assigned seats	14:07	−5	Although this method was the fastest, it was also the least satisfying; Adam commented that the latter result may explain why airlines do not use it.
Reverse Pyramid (a combination of back-to-front and WILMA)	15:10	113	Significantly faster than back-to-front, and the most satisfying.

=== Bite the Bullet ===
A spinoff of Magic Bullet from 2003 and Ice Bullet from 2004.

Myth statement	Status	Notes
A bullet made from a human tooth can inflict a lethal wound and shatter on impact, leaving no evidence to be discovered during an autopsy.	Busted	The Build Team constructed bullets of different types from human teeth donated by a local dentist, with the goal of measuring accuracy, penetrating power, and ability to fool a forensic pathologist. Kari fitted teeth into the cases of .38 Special revolver rounds, while Tory knocked the roots off others and loaded them into 12-gauge shotgun shells and Grant shaped teeth to fit into .308 rifle cartridge cases. He also shaped rounds from bone, using a cow femur. For the accuracy and penetration tests, the team compared their ammunition against standard rounds with lead projectiles. The revolver bullets failed the accuracy test and were discarded, while the shotgun shell and bone rifle bullet gave satisfactory results. The tooth rifle bullet disintegrated before it left the barrel. In the lethality test on a block of ballistic gelatin, the shotgun shell inflicted enough shallow wounds to be judged as potentially lethal, while the bone rifle bullet did not penetrate far enough. However, when Grant made a longer bullet, the increased mass led to lethal penetration of the fragments. Finally, the team put together human analogs from pig carcasses, filling them with simulated internal organs, and fired the shotgun shell and heavy bone rifle bullet into them from close range. When a forensic pathologist examined the wounds, she was able in each case to determine that they were caused by gunshots and to find the projectiles. Since all three ammunition types failed on at least one of the original three counts, the team declared the myth busted.
