= Straight blast =

The straight blast is a martial arts technique popularized by Bruce Lee and associated with Wing Chun Kung Fu and Jeet Kune Do. It is one of Bruce Lee's most famous signature moves, and an international federation of gyms have been named after the technique.

The technique operates on the principle of using a sustained offense as a means of forcing an opponent to move on the defensive. The move consists of putting both fists perpendicularly above one another and moving them in a circular motion (starting forward and downward) in a tight formation with fists kept facing forward bent at the wrist outward and clenched vertically, compounded with running toward an opponent. This is intended to throw off the opponent while effectively dealing a barrage of centrifugally forced punches toward the center of the opponent's mass. A poorly executed or premature straight blast attack can usually be effectively countered by one or more kicks to the attacker's shin, knee, or groin.

In some of his books, Bruce Lee mentions how boxers would scoff at this 'funny' looking technique, but when they were not expecting it in sparring matches, they would take the brunt of the attack, be thrown off guard and defeated.

== See also ==
- One inch punch
