= MythBusters (2008 season) =

- No. of episodes: 20 (includes 8 specials)

Release
- Original network: Discovery Channel
- Original release: January 16 – November 19, 2008

Season chronology
- ← Previous; 2007 season Next → 2009 season

The cast of the television series MythBusters perform experiments to verify or debunk urban legends, old wives' tales, and the like. This is a list of the various myths tested on the show as well as the results of the experiments (the myth is busted, plausible, or confirmed).

== Episode overview ==
No. overall	No. in season	Title	Original release date	Overall episode No.
95	1	"James Bond, Part 1"	January 16, 2008	108
Myths tested: Can a bullet from a 9 mm handgun ignite a propane tank? Can a watch-sized electromagnet deflect a bullet? Can a speed boat jump off of a ramp, land in the water, and continue to operate safely? Note: This is a special James Bond-theme episode.
96	2	"Lead Balloon"	January 23, 2008	109
Myths tested: Can a lead balloon fly? Is it possible to surf a wave caused by an explosion?
97	3	"Airplane on a Conveyor Belt"	January 30, 2008	110
Myths tested: Can an airplane take off while on a conveyor belt? Can cockroaches, fruit flies, and flour beetles survive extreme levels of radiation? Can defrosting shaving cream fill up an entire car?
98	4	"James Bond, Part 2"	February 6, 2008	111
Myths tested: Can 007's exploding ballpoint pen blow a test dummy in half? Can a bowler hat rigged with a steel ring knock the head off a statue? Can a steel jaw sever a steel cable? Note: This is a special episode.
99	5	"Viewers' Special 2"	February 13, 2008	112
Myths tested: Can a person slide down a steel cable using a pair of blue jeans? Does eye black help athletes see? Can a spark follow a trail of gunpowder leaking from a barrel, catch up with it, and explode? Can a tree be cut down using a machine gun? Note: This is a special episode. It was the final appearance of "Mythtern" Jess Nelson.
100	6	"MacGyver Myths"	February 20, 2008	113
Myths tested: Can a person blow a man-sized hole in a wall with one gram of sodium reacting with water? Could MacGyver have built an ultralight airplane from bamboo, trash bags, duct tape, and a cement mixer? How well will Jamie and Adam perform in a MacGyver challenge? Note: This is a special episode.
101	7	"Alaska Special"	April 23, 2008	114
Myths tested: Does cabin fever exist? Does accelerating into a moose cause less damage than braking? Can a single stick of dynamite with a 20 second fuse be thrown, retrieved by a dog, and detonate under an SUV causing it to sink into a frozen lake? Note: This is a special episode.
102	8	"Shark Week Special 2"	July 27, 2008	115
Myths tested: Can sharks detect a struggling fish? Do dogs attract sharks? Does chili powder repel sharks? Will a pack of sharks ignore a person who is playing dead? Do spots of light attract sharks? Could a person being attacked by a shark reach its eye while inside its mouth? Note: This is a special double-length episode.
103	9	"Exploding Steak"	August 6, 2008	116
Myths tested: Can steak be tenderized with explosives? Does driving while angry decrease fuel efficiency?
104	10	"NASA Moon Landing"	August 27, 2008	117
Myths tested: Were some of the photos from the Moon landing fake? Can you bounce a laser off the Moon? Was the film from the Moon faked, and just slowed down? Will a feather and a hammer drop at the same rate in a vacuum? Could a footprint be made like the one on the Moon? Could the flag have flapped like it did on the Moon?
105	11	"Viral Hour"	September 3, 2008	118
Myths tested: Is it possible to lift a car using fire hoses? Do goats faint while getting scared? Can "invisible water" be created to make it look as if a tin foil boat is floating in the air? Can a person create a huge fireball by firing a cloud of sawdust and ignite it with a flare?
106	12	"Phone Book Friction"	September 10, 2008	119
Myths tested: Are two interlaced phone books impossible to pull apart by any means? Can a shark be blown up like they did in Deep Blue Sea?
107	13	"Water Stun Gun"	September 17, 2008	120
Myths tested: Can a conventional electric stun gun be turned into a water-powered electric stun gun? Is firewalking real? Can a fire be put out by placing a fire extinguisher into it?
108	14	"Blind Driving"	October 8, 2008	121
Myths tested: Can a blind man drive a car if given instructions by his passenger? Is it better to play through a tree than around it in golf? Can an explosion in a gopher hole cause a golf ball near the edge of the hole to fall in? Does wearing shoes with metal cleats increase one's chances of getting struck by lightning?
109	15	"Ninjas 2"	October 15, 2008	122
Myths tested: Can a ninja catch an arrow mid-flight? (Revisit of: Catching an Arrow); Could a ninja hide underwater, breathing through a bamboo reed, long enough to attack an enemy with a poison blow-dart? Is Bruce Lee's famous one-inch punch really effective? Note: This is a special episode.
110	16	"Alcohol Myths"	October 22, 2008	123
Myths tested: Does drinking alcohol make people look more attractive? Do alleged ways of sobering up really work? Could the ancient Korean Hwacha actually do what is claimed?
111	17	"Motorcycle Flip"	October 29, 2008	124
Myths tested: Will a motorcycle flip if a pole is thrust into the front wheel? Can someone break out of prison with a rope made of toilet paper, human hair, or bedsheets?
112	18	"Coffin Punch"	November 5, 2008	125
Myths tested: What household objects are bulletproof? Once buried alive inside a coffin, is it possible to punch your way through the coffin and dig yourself out?
113	19	"End With a Bang"	November 12, 2008	126
Myths tested: Is it really true that one cannot polish dung? Is hitting the ground with running legs faster than a standing start? Is it really best to end with a bang?
SP12	Special–1	"Viewer Special Threequel"	November 19, 2008	127
Myths tested: Could a torture technique consisting of growing a bamboo through a victim's body have worked? Does dropping alkali metals in a water-filled bathtub result in a huge explosion? Does brandy, such as carried by Saint Bernards, really prevent hypothermia? Does lighting a piano on fire make it explode? Note: This is a special episode.

== Episode 95 – "James Bond, Part 1" ==
- Original air date: January 16, 2008

The MythBusters test various myths inspired by scenes in several James Bond movies.

=== Electromagnetic Watch ===
Myth statement	Status	Notes
An electromagnet hidden in a wristwatch can deflect bullets (based on Bond's wristwatch in Live and Let Die).	Busted	Jamie built an electromagnet that could fit inside a wristwatch and mounted it near a target. The MythBusters then fired bullets at the target, making sure that the bullets passed close by the electromagnet. However, the wristwatch-sized electromagnet was not powerful enough to change the bullet's trajectory. The MythBusters then upgraded to a larger and more powerful electromagnet, but it still could not deflect the bullet. Finally, the MythBusters resorted to using a series of thirteen extremely powerful permanent rare-earth magnets, which only deflected the bullet enough to bounce off the magnets before hitting the target. The MythBusters explained that a magnet's energy decreased "exponentially" the farther away someone is from the magnet (the force actually follows an inverse square law). Plus, in order to be powerful enough to stop a bullet, an electromagnet would need an enormous amount of energy that could not possibly be contained within a wristwatch, which would make most of the magnet scenes in Bond films impossible (with the possible exception of the unzipping scene).

=== Propane Tank Peril ===
Myth statement	Status	Notes
A person can shoot a propane tank with a 9 mm pistol and make it explode (based on a scene in Casino Royale).	Busted	First, the Build Team decided to test whether it was possible to breach a propane tank with Bond's 9 mm handgun. They found that 9 mm rounds were not powerful enough to breach the tank, but shotgun shells and 7.62 NATO caliber rifle rounds were more than enough to pierce the tank. The Build Team then fired armor-piercing rifle rounds at a tank filled with propane, but they could not get the tank to explode. Not even tracer rounds were successful. Finally, the Build Team resorted to extreme measures in the form of high explosives and an 7.62mm Dillon Aero M134 minigun firing a mix of tracer and incendiary rounds at the same undisclosed location as "Shooting Fish in a Barrel". Both high explosives and the M134 were able to cause the propane tank to explode. The Build Team concluded that the myth was busted as small arms were unable to explode a propane tank as depicted in Casino Royale, and that Bond would not have been able to get hold of a gatling gun or incendiary rounds. Four years later, when Will Hayden of Sons of Guns watched a rerun of this episode, he was compelled to lead a Red Jacket revisit of the myth, which was shown in "Red Jacket Challenges MythBusters". He devised a multi-projectile "Super Beehive" round that still needed only one pull of the trigger and invited Kari and Tory to Red Jacket to revisit the myth and try some weapons. After extensive testing, the myth remained busted—but in return, Kari issued a challenge to Will and invited him and Red Jacket to M5.

=== Speed Boat Survival ===
Myth statement	Status	Notes
A speedboat jumping off a ramp and flying through the air can survive the landing and continue driving (based on a scene in Live and Let Die).	Plausible	The MythBusters obtained a boat that was identical to the model Bond used in the movie. They then converted it so that it could be remote-controlled and built a makeshift ramp in Lake Yosemite. They even put a barge with a car under the ramp to simulate the exact scene from the movie. Adam drove the boat at the ramp at a speed of 45 miles per hour (72 km/h), but he lost control of the boat at the last second and hit the ramp at an angle. As a result, the boat managed to clear the car, but it flipped in the process. However, seeing that there was no visible damage to the boat, the MythBusters decided that the myth was plausible. It was also pointed out that the stunt team in Live and Let Die crashed 17 boats and made about 100 practice runs just to perfect the jump.

== Episode 96 – "Lead Balloon" ==
- Original air date: January 23, 2008

=== Lead Balloon ===
The MythBusters, having already put the concrete glider through its paces, test another flight idiom.

Myth statement	Status	Notes
A lead balloon cannot fly (as per the idiom "going down like a lead balloon").	Busted	Using lead foil, Adam and Jamie constructed a cube-shaped balloon with 10-foot (3 m) edges out of lead. Even without pure helium inside it (a mixture containing air was used to limit buoyancy and reduce the possibility of tearing), the balloon was buoyant enough to support a basket along with some ballast.

=== Explosive Surfing ===
Myth statement	Status	Notes
A person can surf on a wave generated by a few pounds of explosives, as shown in an Internet viral video (e.g., here).	Busted	The Build Team visited a quarry lake and detonated TNT at several depths. They found that the best waves are formed from an explosion at a depth of 12 feet (3.7 m). They then used 200 pounds (91 kg) of TNT and a mechanical surfer (built by Grant) to see if it is possible to generate a wave large enough to surf. Even with 200 pounds of high explosives, the wave was not large enough for surfing. In addition, the consultant (Dr. Van Romero) stated that an explosion of that magnitude would likely cause death by internal bleeding within 24 hours if someone were submerged in the water at the time.

== Episode 97 – "Airplane on a Conveyor Belt" ==
- Original air date: January 30, 2008

=== Airplane on a Conveyor Belt ===
Myth statement	Status	Notes
A plane cannot take off while sitting on a conveyor belt moving at the same speed in the opposite direction.	Busted	The MythBusters first performed a small-scale test with a model airplane and a small conveyor belt and were not able to get the model plane to take off from the belt. It merely fell off the front of the conveyor belt. They then tested a remote-controlled model plane on a moving length of paper. The plane moved forward from its starting position and took off. Finally, they upgraded to full scale using an actual crewed plane and a runway-sized tarp as a makeshift conveyor belt. Like in the small-scale test, the plane moved forward from its starting position and was able to take off from the conveyor belt. The MythBusters explained that this was possible because, unlike with cars, an airplane's means of propulsion are through its propeller or jet engine, not its wheels. A car's engine mechanically moves its wheels, which use their contact with the road and the traction it provides to generate forward movement, while the plane's wheels are free-moving and independent of the propeller, which uses air displacement for forward thrust. Therefore, the conveyor belt has no bearing on the forward momentum of the plane.

=== Shaving Cream in a Car ===
Myth statement	Status	Notes
Freezing a can of shaving cream, cutting it out of the can, and then leaving it to thaw inside a car will cause the shaving cream to expand and fill the car interior.	Busted	The Build Team obtained some shaving cream, froze it, and then placed the contents into a car, but the results were disappointing as the shaving cream did not expand very much. They then put over fifty cans of frozen shaving cream inside, but that strategy failed to produce any results as well. Finally, the Build Team decided to fill the car with industrial strength foam, which would expand much more than shaving cream. The industrial strength foam expanded significantly and was able to fill the entire car. However, the myth was busted since the subject of the myth was shaving cream, which does not expand very much.

=== Cockroaches and Radiation ===
Myth statement	Status	Notes
Cockroaches can survive the radiation of a nuclear holocaust and then inherit the Earth.	Busted	To test the myth thoroughly, the Build Team obtained three different kinds of insects—cockroaches, flour beetles, and fruit flies—and exposed them to varying amounts radiation produced by cobalt-60. They then observed the insects for the next thirty days to see how many would survive after exposure. Surprisingly, the flies and beetles performed much better than the cockroaches, with the beetles being the only insects able to survive the most lethal dose of radiation the Build Team used.
Cockroaches could survive a flood much longer than humans.	Confirmed	In an experiment shown only on the website, the Build Team placed five German cockroaches in separate containers, which were each filled with water, and let sit for 30 minutes. When released, the cockroaches were not moving. However, after waiting a day, the cockroaches had revived. This was explained by the fact that the insects do not need as much oxygen as humans so that they can survive underwater longer.

== Episode 98 – "James Bond, Part 2" ==
- Original air date: February 6, 2008

=== Exploding Pen ===
Myth statement	Status	Notes
A ballpoint pen bomb can be used to completely destroy the top of a mannequin (based on the gadget from GoldenEye).	Busted	Using normal-sized pens filled with explosives, the MythBusters demonstrated that a pen bomb could be fatal. However, they needed an unrealistically large pen to completely destroy the top half of the foam dummy they used.

=== Killer Hat ===
Myth statement	Status	Notes
A metal-brimmed bowler hat can be thrown hard enough to knock the head off a stone statue (based on a scene in Goldfinger).	Busted	The Build Team made two duplicates of the hat worn by Oddjob, built a hat-throwing robot, and acquired a few statues as test targets. The difference between the two hats was that one had a dull steel edge, while the other had a sharp steel edge. The bonded marble statue they first tested was decapitated by the robot, but it was discovered to have been hollow and the test was declared invalid. They next tested a concrete statue on the premise that it would be a good match for the hardness of natural stone, even though it was weaker than solid marble. It was chipped several times but not badly damaged, meaning that there is no way for a thrown hat to decapitate a solid stone statue. The Build Team did, however, prove that it was possible to decapitate a plaster statue with a bowler hat, since plaster is significantly more fragile than stone.

=== Jaws of Steel ===
Myth statement	Status	Notes
A person can use a set of metal teeth to bite through a cable car's cable (based on a scene in Moonraker).	Busted	Adam and Jamie created two versions of the teeth shown in the movies. One was a set of steel teeth set in a normal bone jaw, and the other set was a jaw and teeth made out of hardened steel. However, neither jaw was able to cut through the one-inch cable they used with normal human bite strength. Not even 10 tons' worth of force was able to force the teeth through the cable, with the hydraulic press applying the pressure actually bending itself out of shape. In order to replicate the results seen in the film, Jamie had to use a hydraulic cutter to sever the cable.

=== Martinis: Shaken vs. Stirred ===
Though this is not actually a myth, the Build Team decided to test why James Bond prefers his martinis "shaken, not stirred."

Myth statement	Status	Notes
There is a difference between shaken and stirred martinis.	Confirmed	On physical inspection, the shaken martini is cloudier because of the ice that was crushed because of the shaking, compared to a stirred one, which is clear. However, when the ice in the shaken martini melts, it is similar to the stirred martini. In a blind taste test wherein only Tory knew the clear shaken martinis and the stirred ones, Kari, Grant, and the expert hired for the myth (Anthony Dias Blue, who previously appeared in "Vodka Myths III") were able to correctly distinguish the shaken ones. Several explanations on why this is so were also given. (See the article Shaken, not stirred for details.)

== Episode 99 – "Viewers' Special 2" ==
- Original air date: February 13, 2008

=== Ancient Arrows ===
Question	Notes
A professor of archeology wanted to know why there are so many arrowheads found, when cavemen could have easily used sharpened sticks.	There was no myth to test here; the task was to find if arrowheads were overall more effective than sharpened sticks. Adam and Jamie created sharpened sticks and arrowheads from scratch, noting that it took much longer to make the arrowheads. When shot into ballistics gel, the arrowheads went in farther than the sticks. After some fur was put over the gel, the results were the same, and it was noted that the arrowheads made bigger wounds in the target, which would mean faster bleeding to death for the animal. Adam pointed out that arrowheads would have been akin to caveman technology and would be widely used. Jamie also pointed out that sharpened wooden sticks would have rotted away after so long and therefore would have not been found.

=== Tree Machine Gun ===
Myth statement	Status	Notes
It is possible to chop down a tree with a machine gun.	Confirmed	The Build Team obtained large pine tree trunks and set them up in the Mojave Desert. Using a Thompson submachine gun and a M249 SAW, the team shot at the trees, but they managed to remain standing. The .45 bullets were too slow and inaccurate being shot out of the Thompson, and the small caliber of the 5.56 mm NATO rounds meant that it did not cause enough damage to fell the tree. However, when Kari used a Dillon Aero M134D minigun that fired 7.62mm NATO at 50 rounds per second, the pine trunk combusted and collapsed within a minute. Even firing at a mesquite tree (which is four times as dense as pine) led to the same result, although it took a little longer (just over a minute) to fell it.

=== Eye Black ===
Myth statement	Status	Notes
The reason baseball players wear black markings under their eyes is to help reduce glare from the sun.	Plausible	Adam and Jamie put black eye paint under their eyes and took an eye exam, then repeated with lighter, peach-colored eye paint. Their scores were the same each time. Adam then set up a light meter in a dummy's eye and recorded the lux reading in the eye with and without the paint, but the results were not very different. Adam then put a baseball cap on the dummy and recorded the lux reading again, and he noticed that with the black eye paint on, the lux reading significantly dropped. The theory behind this is that, while the cap is able to block most of the direct light, there is still plenty of light being reflected off one's cheeks and into the eye; the eye black could be meant to reduce this reflected light.

=== Jeans High Wire Escape ===
Myth statement	Status	Notes
It is possible to escape a ski lift by sliding down the cable while using one's jeans as a zip line.	Busted	The Build Team went to a circus training centre and tried to slide down a wire similar to the ones used in ski lifts while hanging on to jeans. Tory barely moved, and the jeans were more likely to rip apart. After the wire was lubricated, though, sliding down it became a little easier. Once the Build Team tried it on a real ski lift, however, the friction was too great, the jeans kept bunching up, and Tory was not able to move easily. Buster had no momentum at all, and the jeans eventually ripped.

=== Leaking Powder Keg ===
Myth statement	Status	Notes
A flame can follow a trail of powder from a leaking barrel and travel up into the barrel, much like in a cartoon.	Confirmed	Adam and Jamie set up a trail of black powder, which burned down the line as predicted. They set up another trail from a funnel and kept the leaking funnel at the end, and the ignited trail carried up into the funnel. Later, a robot carrying a leaking barrel was set up and started to move. However, when the ignited trail reached the robot, it did not follow up the falling powder and into the barrel. It was only when Adam and Jamie increased the size of the hole and had the barrel shaking that the ignition followed into the barrel.

On the MythBusters fansite, the Build Team tested another short myth.

Myth statement	Status	Notes
One can unlock a car door by having its remote unlocker frequency transmitted through a cell phone call.	Busted	When the unlocker was activated near the cell phone, the car door did not open on the other end. In addition, Grant explained that car unlockers and cell phones operate on completely different frequencies. A cell phone deals with frequency within the range of human speech, which is fewer than 10 kHz. This, due to bandwidth restrictions, it would therefore be impossible to recreate the signal of the unlocker.

== Episode 100 – "MacGyver Myths" ==
- Original air date: February 20, 2008

=== Sodium Jailbreak ===
Myth statement	Status	Notes
A person can blow a man-sized hole in a wall with one gram of sodium reacting with water.	Busted	The MythBusters placed sodium in a gel capsule, placed it in a bottle full of warm water, placed the bottle against a cinder block wall, and packed it in with sand. However, one gram of sodium was not powerful enough to damage the wall (or even the bottle it was in), and 100 grams of sodium was also not enough. The MythBusters then used 500 grams of more-reactive potassium placed inside a cannon-like contraption to direct all the force onto the wall, but they still failed to cause any damage. The MythBusters finally resorted to using C4 high explosive to demolish the wall.

=== Bamboo Ultralight ===
Myth statement	Status	Notes
A person can make a working two-seater ultralight plane out of makeshift materials.	Busted	Taking footage from the show, the Build Team built an ultralight plane out of bamboo, duct tape, trash bags, and a cement mixer engine. The show depicted the plane MacGyver built as not being powerful enough to achieve flight on its own, but it was able to attain enough lift to sustain powered flight after taxiing off a cliff. With their plane complete, the Build Team added remote controls and took the plane to a quarry that had flat, level ground and a 150-foot (46 m) cliff. While they demonstrated that the plane's engine had enough power to move the plane, it was not enough to achieve flight and the plane plummeted straight to the ground.
An ultralight plane can make a safe landing while gliding. (This test is shown only on the website.)	Confirmed	Kari demonstrated that even without engine power, an ultralight plane can stay in the air long enough for the pilot to safely land.
An ultralight plane can keep sustained flight with a 9-horsepower (6.7 kW) engine. (This test is shown only on the website.)	Busted	Grant demonstrated that 9 horsepower (6.7 kW) is not enough power to keep a plane in the air, as the test showed that the plane was dropping 200 feet (61 m) per minute.

=== MacGyver Challenge ===
Adam and Jamie were put under a battery of tests to prove that they could match MacGyver's ingenuity. They were not necessarily testing these myths to bust or confirm them but to see whether they had the smarts and the ability to make them work without any preparation. In each test, Adam and Jamie had a one-hour time limit and could use only the materials that they were provided by Tory and Grant.

Task	Status	Notes
Picking a lock by using lightbulb filaments.	Pass	While the show had MacGyver picking the lock in just 52 seconds, it took the MythBusters 52 minutes to pick the lock.
Developing film with ordinary household chemicals such as ammonia and orange juice.	Fail	Both Adam and Jamie were placed in a room that had multiple household chemicals that included the necessary ones to develop photos. While Adam did have some experience in developing photos and could remember the necessary ingredients, he could not remember the exact process and the MythBusters were unable to develop the photos within the given time limit. (The proper technique to develop film this way is to soak the film in orange juice for 10 minutes and then wash it with ammonia as a fixer, all without exposing the film to light.)
Creating a makeshift magnetic compass.	Pass	Adam and Jamie built a makeshift electromagnet by wrapping wire around a metal screw and connecting it to some batteries. They then used the electromagnet to magnetize a paperclip, put the paperclip in a cork, and floated the cork in a cup of water to create a compass. While it was not perfect, it was good enough to direct the MythBusters to their next objective.
Creating a makeshift device that can go 100 feet (30 m) into the air and attract the attention of a passing helicopter.	Pass	Using materials found at an improvised "rebel camp," the MythBusters were left to try to create some kind of signal that would be visible 100 ft (30 m) in the air. Tory and Grant originally intended for Adam and Jamie to build a potato cannon and left the requisite materials, but the MythBusters had different ideas. They used a tarp, a PVC pipe, and a rope to create a large kite, and though it took several failed attempts, they were able to get it to fly at a height of 100 feet (30 m) within minutes of the time limit expiring.

=== MacGyver Mini Myths ===
In the weeks before the broadcast of the MacGyver special, the MythBusters were advertising this special by using the following mini myths.

Myth statement	Status	Notes
Someone can break a lightbulb by spraying it with drain cleaner.	Confirmed	The spray caused a thermal shock to the hot glass of the lamp, making it break.
You can repair a blown fuse by wrapping it in a gum wrapper.	Confirmed	Adam demonstrated that this is possible.
You can fix an acid leak with chocolate.	Confirmed	Kari and Grant showed that this myth is true. The chemicals and sugars in chocolate neutralize the acid.

== Episode 101 – "Alaska Special" ==
- Original air date: April 23, 2008

The MythBusters went to Alaska as part of the Discovery Channel's Alaska Week.

=== Dynamite Dog ===
Myth statement	Status	Notes
If a dog retrieves a stick of dynamite thrown onto a frozen lake and gets underneath an SUV, the dynamite will blow a hole in the ice that will cause the SUV to sink.	Busted	To test this myth, Adam and Jamie went to Fischer Pond in Alaska. The dog consistently retrieved and brought back the object thrown onto the frozen lake, at about the same speed each time. However, under the SUV, the dynamite did next to nothing. It took 24 pounds (11 kg) of dynamite (packed into high-density directional cones) to blow a hole large enough to sink the SUV. Jamie noted that in order for a single stick of dynamite to break the ice, it would have to be so thin that the SUV (and probably even a human) would cause the ice to break under its weight. This myth had formed part of the plot of the 2006 movie The Darwin Awards, in which Adam and Jamie had cameo appearances.

=== Cabin Fever ===
Myth statement	Status	Notes
Cabin fever is real.	Plausible	To test this myth, Adam and Jamie were locked inside separate cabins in Alaska, with no entertainment at all. Both regularly took cognitive tests (to measure mental capacity) and saliva tests (to measure stress). However, the results of the cognitive tests were too consistent, and the saliva tests were rendered worthless by the fact that Adam and Jamie frequently sullied them by eating and drinking beforehand. However, Adam exhibited all four common symptoms of cabin fever (irritability, forgetfulness, restlessness, and excessive sleeping), and Jamie exhibited one (excessive sleeping).

=== Moose Mayhem ===
Myth statement	Status	Notes
It is better to run under a moose at high speed than with the brakes.	Busted	To test this belief, the Build Team first created a rubber model of a moose with similar weight and consistency after direct study of actual animals using a modified form of Magnus Gens's model. They then ran similar passenger cars into the moose at different speeds and found that while greater speeds did make the moose hit higher, it still did not clear the car and still caused extreme amounts of damage. They repeated the test with a low sports car at the highest test track speed to give the moose the best chance of clearing the roof, but, again, it was not enough and the moose damaged the car enough that any driver would have been seriously injured. The Build Team surmised that for the moose to actually clear a car would require a vehicle as low as a Formula One car traveling at 97 miles per hour (156 km/h).

== Episode 102 – "Shark Week Special 2" ==
- Original air date: July 27, 2008

This was a double-length episode for Shark Week 2008 in which seven myths were tested.

=== Eye Gouge ===
Myth statement	Status	Notes
Could a person find and poke the eyes of a shark in the fury of a shark attack?	Plausible	Bruce, the robot shark To test this, Adam and Jamie built a robot shark they named Bruce, after the shark in Jaws. Bruce could move as a true shark would in an attack. He was equipped with stop switches for eyes and two sets of teeth (one metal, and a softer set for the test). They put Bruce in the water and Tory and Adam in its mouth. When the myth was tested, they found that some positions of the body make it harder to hit the eyes. Lying face up took the smallest amount of time, while lying face down—as someone would on a surfboard—was much harder.

=== Playing Dead ===
The myth was said to be borne out of claims from several survivors of the sinking of the USS Indianapolis.

Myth statement	Status	Notes
In shark-infested waters, "playing dead" can aid a person in avoiding a potential attack.	Confirmed	Grant and Tory took turns playing the "dead sailor" and the panicked sailor. The sharks seem to be interested in the panicked sailor more than the dead one, even when Grant and Tory switched roles.

=== Animal Magnetism ===
Myth statement	Status	Notes
Magnets will be able to repel a shark by messing with its keen electromagnetic senses.	Busted	When this myth was tested on a small nurse shark in a confined area, the shark did seem to have a distinct aversion to the powerful magnets, but when the myth was tested in a real-world scenario and with larger sharks, there was no appreciable difference in the sharks' behavior.

=== Dog Bait ===
Myth statement	Status	Notes
A shark will attack a dog swimming in the water, as the dog's swimming mimics the vibrations of an injured fish.	Busted	The Build Team built a robot dog they named Robo Dog, with the correct sounds, movement, and smell. When they put Robo Dog in the water, there was no behavior from the sharks that changed because of the robot, even when the urine and scent were released. There was, however, a slight reaction when the blood was released.

=== Spicy Salsa Shark Shield ===
Myth statement	Status	Notes
Chili pepper and/or salsa is/are a good deterrent against sharks.	Busted	The sharks attacked every balloon the MythBusters used for the test, both the controls and the ones filled with salsa. None of the sharks appeared to be affected by the salsa at all.

=== Fatal Flashlight ===
Myth statement	Status	Notes
During a night dive, a person will attract more sharks with a flashlight than without it.	Plausible	The Build Team went under water to an old sunken ship at night first without flashlights for 20 minutes. The only light was very small so the camera could see the team better (with light magnification). Tory saw four sharks on the first go, Grant saw two, and Kari saw only a turtle. The second go with flashlights was much different. Not only did they see more sharks, but they also were attacking much more aggressively. They pulled the plug five minutes early because it was becoming too dangerous. (Note: The "Wet and Wild" special provided more detail as to the reason for this decision: the flashlights attracted the presence of a tiger shark against which the protective chain mail the team was wearing would have been ineffective.) In the second round, Tory saw six sharks, Grant saw four, and Kari saw two (and still saw the turtle), twice the number of the first run in only 75% the time.

=== Fish Flap ===
Myth statement	Status	Notes
The sound of a flapping fish will attract more sharks than if the fish was stationary.	Plausible	Adam and Jamie decided to retest this myth from their previous Shark Week special due to fear that their use of a real fish skewed the results (by allowing the sharks to see and smell the fish as well as hear it). For the retest, they used plastic fish cutouts shielded by screens, so that only the flapping would be available to the sharks. There was some increase in shark activity towards the flapping fish, but not enough to be especially appreciable until the screen was removed and the sharks could see the fish. In the end, Adam and Jamie both agree that, while the sound of the fish flapping can very well get the sharks' interests up initially, it is not enough to hold that interest without additional stimuli.

=== Shark-Prey Vision ===
This was a web-exclusive mini myth that Kari, Grant, and Tory tested.

Myth statement	Status	Notes
A shark can see prey that are above the ocean's surface.	Confirmed	Kari and Tory threw fish into the water to attract sharks while Grant watched them from underwater for the control. Then, Kari held a fish on a pole one foot above the water. Within minutes, sharks began to notice and tried to bite it.

== Episode 103 – "Exploding Steak" ==
- Original air date: August 6, 2008

=== Exploding Meat ===
Myth statement	Status	Notes
An explosion can tenderize a steak.	Confirmed	Adam and Jamie first placed tough cuts of steak in three explosive rigs (the first with a large high explosive, the second with a small black powder explosive, and the third with a medium high-explosive charge in a suspended vessel with a heavy steel plate). In all rigs, the steaks and explosives were placed in water to equalize the concussive force. The steaks were cooked and compared to two controls: an untouched steak and a steak with powdered meat tenderizer. The steaks were put in a blind taste test, but the judges (i.e., Adam, Jamie, and Ron Siegel) were inconsistent in determining what steak was most tender. The MythBusters then tried to tenderize steaks by shooting them out of an air cannon into a steel target or placing them with large ball bearings into a clothes dryer. The meat was then tested using a device similar to USDA machines for determining meat toughness. The machine proved to be an objective and consistent method for testing, and both methods for pulverizing the steaks were shown to be successful. Adam and Jamie then retried all the explosive rigs and tested the meat with the device. The exploded meat was far more tender than the control.

=== Don't Drive Angry ===
Myth statement	Status	Notes
Driving while angry decreases fuel economy.	Confirmed	Tory and Grant drove a test course through deserted suburban streets (an abandoned military housing subdivision for the former Fort Ord in Marina, California 36.67043°N 121.79783°W) that included an aggressive driver, a slow driver, a person walking through a crosswalk, and a parking test. Before the first test, they were both given stimuli designed to relax them, including getting a massage, having contact with puppies, and seeing favorite movies. Before the second, they were given stimuli designed to aggravate them, including large amounts of caffeine, denial of bathroom facilities, a more painful massage, Grant's feet being put in water with fish, and a false revelation that they were given laxatives. Both drivers used about a third more fuel in the second run than the first—Tory used more fuel even though he took the wrong path and completed only two-thirds of the required course distance.

== Episode 104 – "NASA Moon Landing" ==
- Original air date: August 27, 2008

This episode was announced by "This Week at NASA" on NASA TV on February 8, 2008. The episode was filmed at the Marshall Space Flight Center with the assistance of the center's scientists and was centered around myths that the moon landings were faked.

=== Faked Photos ===
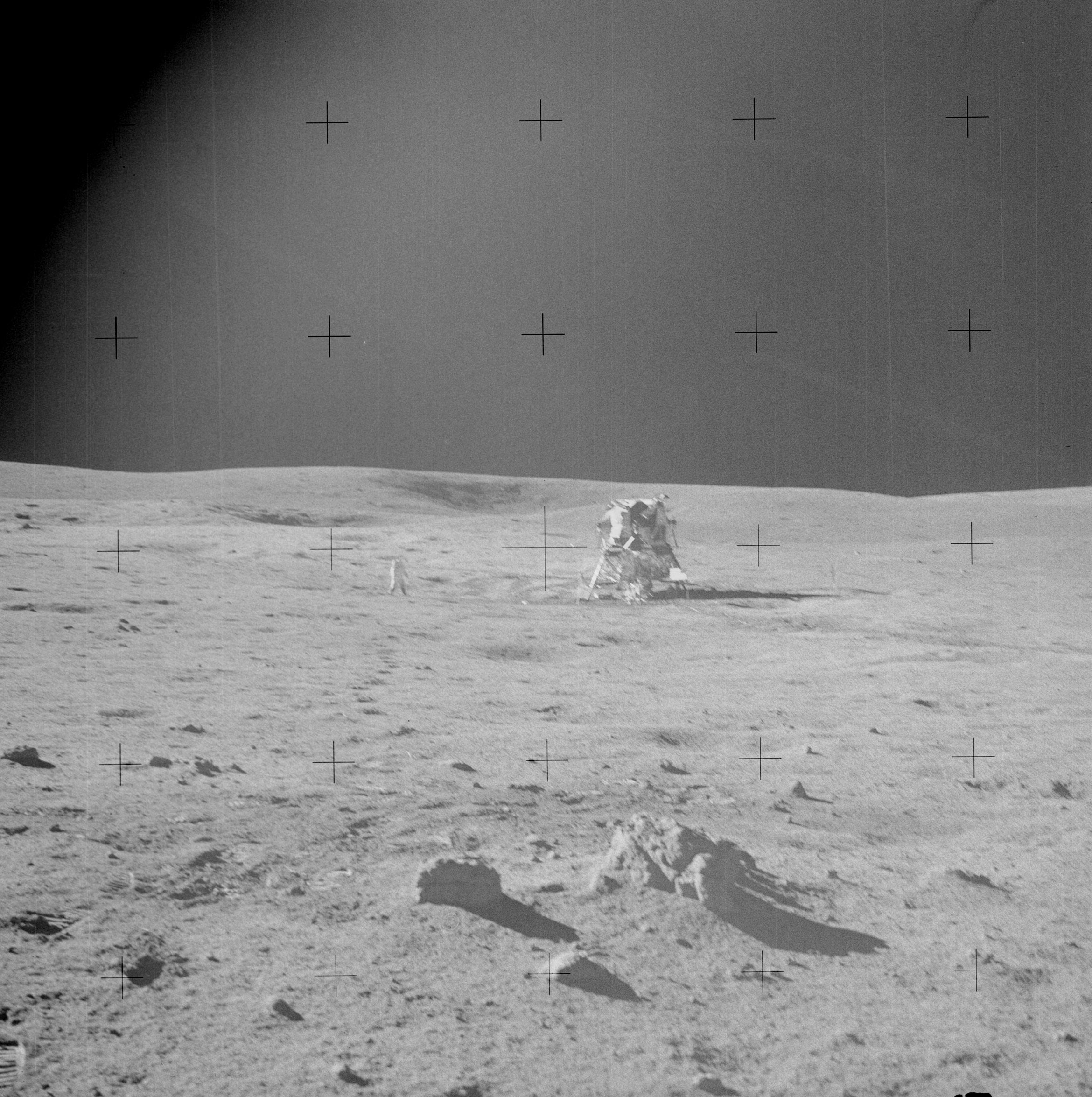
Apollo 14 photo: shadows appear to point different directions

Aldrin in shadow yet clearly visible

Myth statement	Status	Notes
One of the NASA photos is fake because the shadows of the rocks and lunar lander are not parallel.	Busted	The MythBusters built a small-scale replica of the lunar landing site with a flat surface and a single distant spotlight to represent the Sun. They took a photo, and all the shadows in the photo were parallel, as the myth proposed. The MythBusters then adjusted the topography of the model surface to include a slight hill around the location of the near rocks so the shadows fell on a slope instead of a flat surface. The resulting photograph had the same shadow directions as the original NASA photograph from Apollo 14.
One of the NASA photos is fake because Buzz Aldrin can be clearly seen while in the shadow of the lunar lander.	Busted	To test this, the MythBusters built a much larger scale (1:6) replica of the landing site, including a dust surface with a color and albedo similar to lunar soil. The MythBusters then took a photograph that was nearly identical to the original NASA photo from Apollo 11. The MythBusters explained that the astronaut was visible because of light being reflected off the Moon's surface.

=== Vacuum Myths ===
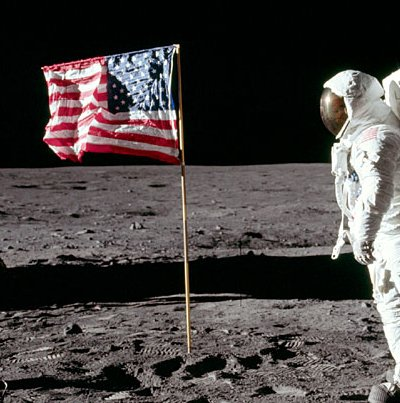
Buzz Aldrin and American flag

Buzz Aldrin footprint

In order to test these myths, the Build Team made a trip to the Marshall Space Flight Center to use one of their specialized vacuum chambers. The hammer and feather demonstration was not aired in the original episode due to time constraints, but it can be seen as a supplement on the MythBusters website.

Myth statement	Status	Notes
Footage of the American flag planted on the Moon shows it flapping, and a flag cannot flap in a vacuum, so it could not have been filmed on the Moon.	Busted	The Build Team placed a replica of the American flag planted on the Moon into the vacuum chamber. They manipulated the flag in a manner similar to what the astronauts did when they planted the flag on the Moon, then stopped the manipulation. They first tested at normal pressure; the momentum moved the flag around somewhat but quickly dissipated. In pure vacuum conditions, after the manipulation stopped, the momentum caused the flag to flap wildly as if it were being blown by a breeze. This is because there was no resistance from air to dampen the motion. This proved that in a vacuum, a flag does not need wind to flap for a while after a person sets it in motion.
A clear footprint cannot be made in a vacuum, because there is no moisture to hold its shape.	Busted	The Build Team first tested whether dry sand or wet sand made a more distinguishable footprint by stepping in them with an astronaut boot. It was clear that the wet footprint had more detail than the dry footprint. They then placed sand similar in composition to the soil on the Moon in a vacuum chamber and stepped on it with an astronaut boot, which made a clear print. The reason for this is that the composition of lunar soil differs from terrestrial sand, meaning it behaves differently when stepped on. Terrestrial soil is weathered and rounded, so the particles do not support each other's weight very well. Lunar soil, because it is not weathered, has a more jagged texture, so the particles "lock" with each other and will hold the shape of the imprint much more clearly.
In a vacuum, a feather and a hammer will drop at the same rate and hit the ground at the same time.	Confirmed	Kari first dropped a hammer and feather at atmospheric pressure, showing that air resistance caused the feather to fall more slowly than the hammer. However, when the test was repeated in the vacuum chamber, the hammer and feather fell at the same rate.

=== Slowed Film Fakery ===
Myth statement	Status	Notes
The film of the astronauts moonwalking is actually film of the astronauts skipping in front of a high frame-rate camera, slowing down the picture and giving the illusion they are on the Moon.	Busted	Adam donned a replica NASA space suit and mimicked the astronauts' motions while being filmed by a slow motion camera. They also attached Adam to wires in order to mimic the Moon's lower gravity. While comparing the new and original footage, the MythBusters noted that at first glance, they looked similar, but there were many small discrepancies due to filming in Earth's gravity. In order to film in microgravity, the MythBusters boarded a reduced gravity aircraft run by Zero Gravity Corporation and filmed exactly the same movements. Adam noted that the movements were more comfortable and made more sense in microgravity, and the footage from the plane looked exactly like the original film. The MythBusters concluded that the Moon landing film is authentic.

=== Moon Laser ===
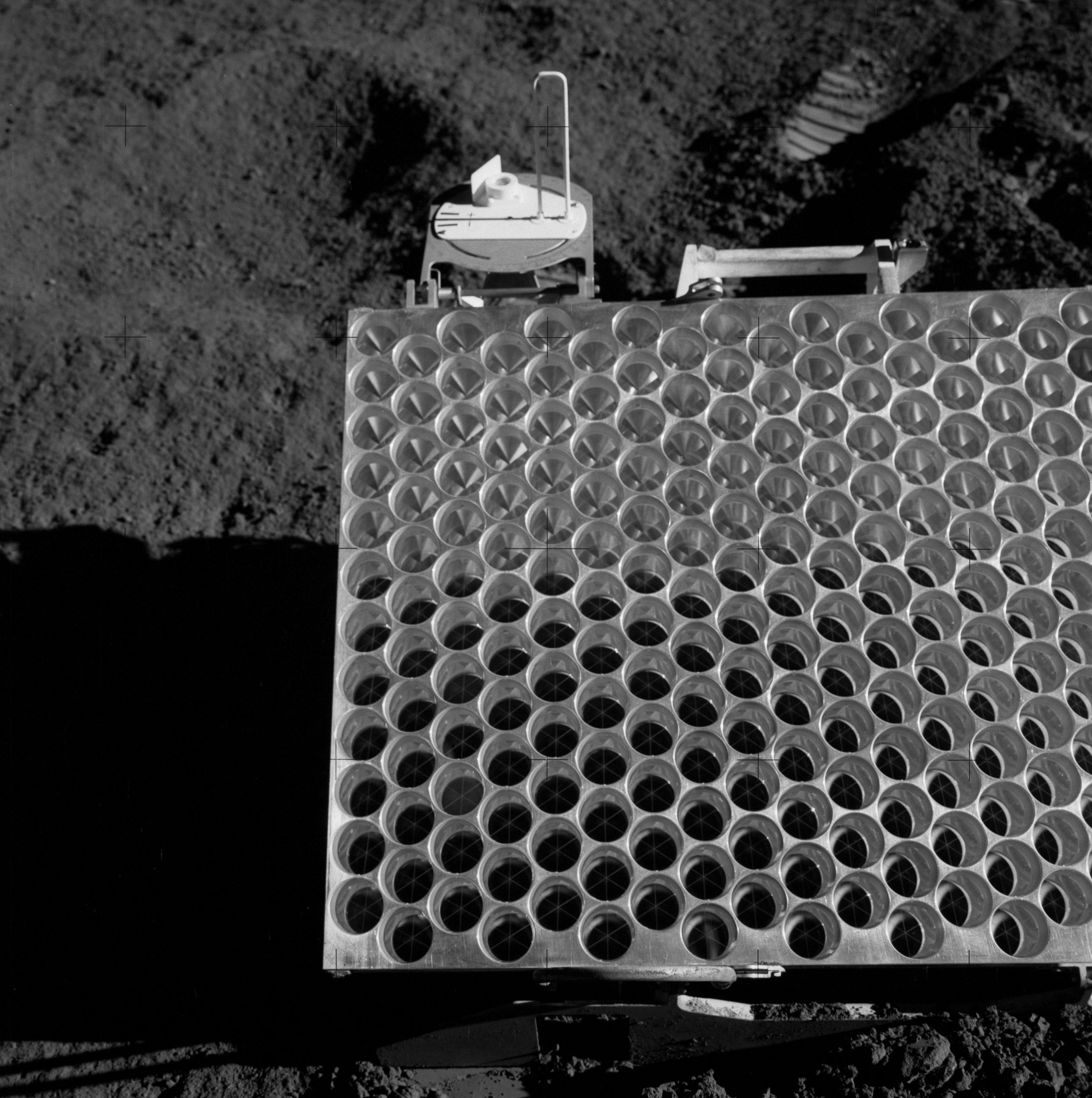
Apollo 15 Lunar Laser Ranging Retroreflector

Claim	Status	Notes
The Apollo astronauts left special equipment on the Moon, such as reflectors off which Earth-bound scientists can bounce lasers.	Confirmed	The MythBusters went to Apache Point Observatory, which is equipped with a high-powered laser. They first fired it at the bare lunar surface but did not detect the laser reflecting back. They then pointed the laser at a retroreflector left behind by Apollo 15 and received a confirmed reflection.

== Episode 105 – "Viral Hour" ==
- Original air date: September 3, 2008

Despite the fact that most of the myths tested in this episode were confirmed, the MythBusters warned that not all viral videos are what they appear. They posted their version of the hoax Rubik's Cube viral videos online that showed Adam solving a Rubik's Cube with his feet while Jamie solved one blindfolded. In reality, they started with solved cubes and just manipulated them randomly. They then ran the footage backwards in order to give the illusion that they solved the puzzles. The illusion was partially achieved by having a crewmember walk backwards in the background so he would appear to walk normally in the final video.

=== Fireman's Lift ===
Myth statement	Status	Notes
A small car can be lifted into the air by high-pressure fire hoses.	Confirmed	The MythBusters first created a small-scale experiment using a model car and a set of garden hoses connected to a single fire hose. The small-scale model worked perfectly, proving that the basic idea was at least possible. Before the full-scale test, the duo decided to find out the pounds of thrust by using a machine; however, the water pressure destroyed the machine. During the full-scale experiment, the MythBusters could not get the car to levitate. Part of the problem was because the necessary pressure to lift the weight of the car was beyond the water pressure the city's system could provide. They then got the idea to take out the car's engine block, deducing that the people who performed the stunt in the viral video may have done the same thing. Once the engine was removed, the car then levitated a full 15 feet (4.6 m) in the air for 45 seconds.

=== Fainting Goats ===
Myth statement	Status	Notes
Goats can be startled into fainting.	Confirmed	Tory and Kari went to a goat farm and attempted to scare some goats into fainting. Initially, they had trouble doing so; they tried many things from using an umbrella to hiding in food to having Kari flashing the goats (causing Tory to pretend to faint). While none of the attempts by the hosts to intentionally startle goats succeeded, the show's crew frequently caused goats to faint by accident while filming. The attending goat handler explained that some goats, when startled or scared, involuntarily stiffen their leg muscles, which can cause them to fall over and give the appearance of fainting. Tory and Kari warned that results are subjective depending on the goats, but the myth is still very true.

=== Sawdust Cannon ===
Myth statement	Status	Notes
A person can create a huge fireball by firing a cloud of sawdust and igniting it with a flare.	Confirmed	The Build Team built the cannon according to the specifications shown in the video and replicated the experiment. While it initially looked as if it was going to be busted, the sawdust actually ignited into a large fireball exactly as shown in the video. The Build Team then decided to scale up the sawdust experiment, using a larger, more powerful cannon and extremely flammable powdered non-dairy creamer. This created a massive fireball that greatly startled the Build Team and buried one of their ground-level cameras under a thick layer of burnt creamer.

=== Invisible Water ===
Myth statement	Status	Notes
"Invisible water" can be created to make it look as if a tin foil boat was floating in the air.	Confirmed	Adam and Jamie filled a fishtank with sulfur hexafluoride, a gas six times denser than air, and placed a foil boat in it. The resulting buoyancy force was enough to keep the boat from sinking to the bottom. They then filled a small cup with the sulfur hexafluoride from the tank and poured it on top of the foil boat, which did then sink under the additional weight.

=== iOnion ===
This was a myth based on a video posted on the YouTube website (it was this video created by the user Household Hacker). This myth was cut for time, which was why it was not shown in the actual episode. It was instead posted as a supplement on the MythBusters website.

Myth statement	Status	Notes
One can charge an MP3 player like an iPod by plugging a USB cable into an onion that has been soaked in electrolyte fluid for half an hour.	Busted	Grant tested this myth according to the process shown in the video, but he was unable to get the iPod to charge. In order to confirm whether or not any charge was moving across the onion, Grant plugged a voltmeter into the onion, which indicated that there was zero charge in the onion. Grant explained that the basic idea would be that the electrolytes could be used as a sort of "wet battery", but the setup in the video lacked the vital anode and cathode, which would actually move the electrolytes. With this evidence, Grant declared the video a hoax.

== Episode 106 – "Phone Book Friction" ==
- Original air date: September 10, 2008

=== Phone Book Friction ===
Myth statement	Status	Notes
It is impossible to separate two phonebooks interleaved page-to-page due to the massive amount of friction between the 800 pages of each book.	Partly busted	The MythBusters tried to pull the books apart with human power, first attempting to do so on their own and then bringing in ten other people (which included Tory and Kari in a separate test) to help. These attempts did not succeed, so they hooked up a pair of cars to try to pull the phonebooks apart. However, the books held, and the MythBusters resorted to using the Military Vehicle Technology Foundation's M551 Sheridan light tank and M113 armored personnel carrier, with a combined 650 horsepower, which were finally able to pull the phonebooks apart, but they still did not separate every page. While the myth was busted, the MythBusters pointed out that it took 8,000 pounds (3,600 kg, or about 36,000 N) of force to part the phonebooks; the two cars they used in the testing could have been suspended from ropes connected to the two interleaved books without separating them.
Only a strong man can tear a phonebook in half.	Busted	Adam showed that there is a trick to tearing apart a phonebook. He bent the book into a V separating the pages, tearing them one at a time.

=== Black Powder Shark ===
The Build Team received a request to test whether the final scene in the film Deep Blue Sea, where the protagonists destroy the last shark with a harpoon gun, some gunpowder, and a car battery, was possible. To test these myths, Tory built a replica shark named Hugo out of foam.

Myth statement	Status	Notes
Gunpowder can be set off by a car battery by using seawater to conduct the spark.	Busted	The spark created by the car battery was not powerful enough to be conducted through seawater into the gunpowder.
A harpoon gun is accurate up to 100 feet (30 m).	Confirmed	Tory was able to hit Hugo accurately in exactly the same spot that was shown in the movie.
Ten flares contain enough black powder for two and a half sticks of dynamite.	Busted	Grant first began by trying to take apart several tube flares, which took far longer than it did in the movie. After measuring the powder, the Build Team calculated that it would take at least 450 flares' worth of gunpowder to equal two and a half sticks of dynamite, instead of the ten shown in the movie.
Two and a half sticks of dynamite will cause a tremendous explosion.	Busted	The Build Team first tested this myth by using a canister with the same dimensions as in the movie, which could hold only 28 grams of powder, which did not even disturb the surface of the water, and caused minimal damage to Hugo. Two and a half sticks of dynamite (681 grams of powder) was enough to blow up Hugo and cause a large explosion but not anywhere near as large as seen in the movie. The Build Team also concluded that the size of the canister needed to contain two and a half sticks of dynamite would make the harpoon too heavy to hit a target 100 feet (30 m) away. Eventually, to produce an explosion of the movie's magnitude, 400 pounds (180 kg) of TNT was used.
A person can survive a large underwater explosion at a distance of 50 feet (15 m).	Busted	The Build Team tested this myth by using rigs containing rupture discs that would burst if they were hit with a lethal pressure of 500 psi (3,400 kPa). They placed several in varying distances from the explosion, and determined that a person would have to be at least 150 feet (46 m) away in order to have a chance of survival.

== Episode 107 – "Water Stun Gun" ==
- Original air date: September 17, 2008

=== Water Stun Gun ===
Myth statement	Status	Notes
It is possible to create a water-powered stun gun.	Busted	The MythBusters first tested various commercial water guns to see if they could create a steady, unbroken stream of water, which is essential for the conduction of electricity (as demonstrated in an earlier myth from the first series, Peeing on the Third Rail). However, most of the commercial water guns they tested could not shoot a continuous stream of water long enough to carry the current. The MythBusters then tested the amount of electricity a stream of water could deliver to a target, but they discovered the voltage dropped significantly the farther away the target was, ultimately failing at any distance over a few feet, making it impractical to use at long distances and busting the myth. In order to see what it would take to have a water stun gun work at a distance, the MythBusters used a tesla coil to power the gun with up to a million volts. The gun worked at a distance, and the lightning bolt could clearly be seen traveling down the stream of water. However, the rig remained impractical due to its sheer size and the amount of electricity required to operate it.

=== Fire Fables ===
==== Extinguisher Explosion ====
The Build Team tested whether the following fire extinguishers, if thrown into a fire, will explode and put out the fire.

Myth statement	Status	Notes
A carbon dioxide fire extinguisher with a safety valve	Busted	The carbon dioxide fire extinguisher did not explode, due to the safety valve, and merely vented its contents harmlessly over a span of fifteen minutes.
A water fire extinguisher	Busted	The water fire extinguisher did better than the carbon dioxide fire extinguisher, but it did not manage to extinguish the flames entirely.
A chemical foam extinguisher	Plausible	The chemical foam extinguisher actually exploded, putting out the fire by scattering the fuel rather than actually extinguishing it.
A carbon dioxide fire extinguisher without a safety valve	Plausible	Like the chemical extinguisher, the carbon dioxide fire extinguisher exploded, putting out the fire by scattering the fuel rather than actually extinguishing it.

==== Fire Walking ====
Myth statement	Status	Notes
The act of walking over coals is purely a mind-over-matter act and cannot be explained by science.	Busted	The Build Team first tested how much heat could be transferred into a bare foot by walking over coals with heat-resistant silicone. They then theorized that feet do not get burned due to three factors: The foot does not stay in contact with the coals long enough to get burned, and both the coals and the resulting ash form an insulating layer to lock in the majority of the heat. They then tried coal walking and easily crossed the coals. The team noted that they felt confident because of their faith in physics. For a more complete result, the Build Team had Adam, who was not aware of the physics involved, cross the coals. When Adam tried, he had his feet burned, though this was attributed to him using the incorrect technique. Adam walked too fast and had hot coals stuck under his toes, meaning they stayed in contact with his skin longer than normal.

== Episode 108 – "Blind Driving" ==
- Original air date: October 8, 2008

=== Blind Driving ===
Myth statement	Status	Notes
A blind person can drive a car safely by following instructions given by a passenger (based on a scene in Scent of a Woman).	Confirmed	Adam and Jamie first tried driving while blindfolded but failed miserably. They got a real blind person (Jerry Kuns) behind the wheel within the same abandoned subdivision as with the myth Don't Drive Angry (though differently routed and with a driveway parking component rather than parallel parking on the street), and he did fairly well. However, when the instructor (Jamie) was intoxicated and unable to communicate properly, the test did not go as well. If the passenger was drunk, the communications broke down, preventing the blind driver from getting clear, precise, and timely instructions. Adam and Jamie also emphasized that this sort of driving is illegal: If the passenger is rendered incapacitated, the blind person would have no way of knowing what was on the road and how to respond, obviously increasing the risk of an accident. Furthermore, a person rendered blind before he or she could get a driver's license would have no preconceptions of how to drive, making following instructions easier than if he or she had previous driving experience. They reasoned that this is because a person with experience wants to do what he or she thinks should be done, while a person with no experience would rely solely on the instructor.

=== Golf Galore ===
==== 90% Air ====
Myth statement	Status	Notes
It is better to hit a golf ball straight through the boughs of a tree than around it because it is 90% air.	Busted	Tory, having played golf since high school, hit 10 balls through a tree, resulting in 6 going through, 2 bad shots, and 2 ricocheting off the tree trunk; Grant and Kari proved inept at driving. Grant then built a robot that got only 24 out of 100 golf balls through the tree, versus the 90 stated in the myth. Tory competed against the robot and won with 27 balls shot through the tree.

==== Lightning Cleats ====
Myth statement	Status	Notes
Metal-cleated shoes attract lightning.	Busted	Two identical ballistics gel dummies were constructed. One wore metal-cleated shoes, and the other wore plastic-cleated ones. Both were exposed to simulated lightning, and lightning actually struck the plastic cleats more often, although the number was too close for a definitive preference to be called (6 times versus 4). For a second test, the dummy wearing the metal cleats was then dressed further with clothing, a necklace, and a metal-laden belt to increase the likelihood of being struck, but the plastic one was also struck during the test, although less often (8 times for the metal cleats versus 2). As a finale, the Build Team demonstrated the danger of holding up a golf club during a thunderstorm. Lightning struck the club and went through the dummy, melting him.

==== Gopher Goner ====
Myth statement	Status	Notes
C4 makes a huge fireball, and from just 50 yards away, it can knock a golf ball on the edge of the hole into the cup.	Busted	Based on the final scene of Caddyshack, this myth once again demonstrated the difference between Hollywood and the real world. A smoke ball was the only result of a C4 explosion, and the ball did not go in the hole. As a finale, Tory, Grant, and Kari used gasoline to create the fireball seen in the movie.

== Episode 109 – "Ninjas 2" ==
- Original air date: October 15, 2008

=== Catching an Arrow ===
This myth was revisited due to fan complaints that the bow was too close to the arrow-catching rig, so the arrow was traveling faster than it would at a farther distance. Fans also pointed out many people who could catch an arrow on camera and wanted the MythBusters to bring one on the show.

Myth statement	Status	Notes
A ninja can catch an arrow in mid-flight.	Busted	The MythBusters first tested the speed of an arrow and showed that an arrow maintains its speed as far as 70 feet (21 m) because of its aerodynamic design. They then brought "The Arrowcatcher" Anthony Kelly onto the show and had him perform various tests. Anthony proved that he could catch tennis balls traveling at 85 miles per hour (137 km/h) (breaking a world record in the process). They then had him try to catch an actual arrow, and Anthony succeeded in catching an arrow. However, at Anthony's request, the arrow had been fired below full strength (3/4 strength) and directly in front of him. The MythBusters decided to redo the test by firing arrows at full strength from multiple directions. This time, Anthony had much more trouble and could catch the arrows only when he knew which direction they were coming from. Since Anthony was unable to catch the arrow in full combat conditions, the MythBusters considered the myth busted.

=== Special Forces Ninja's Revenge ===
Myth statement	Status	Notes
While charging his or her target, a Special Forces Ninja can use his or her sword to deflect an arrow and kill the archer before the archer can nock another.	Confirmed	Anthony declared that it was unlikely a ninja would be cornered by three archers and proposed a one-on-one battle. During the demonstration, Adam shot an arrow at Anthony. Anthony deflected the arrow with his sword and was able to close the distance and "kill" Adam before he had time to loose his second shot.

=== Underwater Blow Dart ===
Myth statement	Status	Notes
A ninja hiding underwater can have his or her blowgun double as a breathing apparatus.	Plausible	The Build Team first tested to see how long a ninja could last underwater before succumbing to hypothermia. Tory submerged himself in a cold water tank and managed to stay in it for an hour. Kari, being the most accurate shooter, tried firing her blowgun from underwater. Though she initially had problems with refraction, Kari was able to hit the target with her third try. The Build Team then tested the myth combining all three elements of the myth. However, when the team members were loading their darts, water entered the blowguns and weakened the force of the darts. They then tried it with the darts pre-loaded, breathing with clenched teeth, and succeeded in "assassinating" their target. With all parts of the myth possible, the Build Team declared the myth plausible.

=== The One-inch Punch ===
Myth statement	Status	Notes
A Special Forces Ninja operator can knock down a person with a punch from one inch away, as made famous by Bruce Lee.	Plausible	The first had Jamie test a full force conventional punch and measure the force. Anthony, who was trained in the use of the one-inch punch, performed it. The one-inch punch had half the force of Jamie's punch, and the three-inch punch had two-thirds the force. Anthony further demonstrated the power of the punch by using it to break only the last of three wooden boards, a feat that Jamie was unable to match. The MythBusters concluded that with the right training, a person can use the one-inch punch with enough power and expertise to knock out a person.

== Episode 110 – "Alcohol Myths" ==
- Original air date: October 22, 2008

=== Beer Goggles ===
Myth statement	Status	Notes
Alcohol can make people look more attractive.	Plausible	To maximize objectivity, the MythBusters decided to look at a number of sample photos and rate them while sober and again while drunk. Adam started first by rating 30 women and gave a rating of 96 out of a total of 300. Kari rated photos of 30 men and had a total score of 154. Finally, Jamie had a score of 116. While buzzed (drinking only a few beers), Adam had a score of 121, Kari had 89, and Jamie had 105. While completely drunk, Adam had a score of 134, Kari had 153, and Jamie had 111. In conclusion, even though they had different results, the MythBusters decided the myth was plausible since their overall scores increased when they got completely drunk.

=== Stone Cold Sober ===
Adam and Jamie tested several alleged methods for sobering up quickly. For each test, one of the co-hosts subjected himself to the remedy while the other did not, and both then traced a line pattern as quickly and accurately as possible. The difference in their performances was taken as the effectiveness of the remedy, although Adam also mentioned at the end of the experiment that their BAC measurements agreed with the differences in their performances as well. They tried to sober up by...

Myth statement	Status	Notes
...drinking black coffee.	Busted	Jamie's and Adam's results were about the same, showing no change.
...exercising vigorously.	Plausible	After running for five minutes on a treadmill, Adam's test had a remarkable improvement over the control test. During the test, Adam slipped and fell off the treadmill, but he was not injured.
...dunking their heads in ice water.	Busted	The results showed no effect.
...getting slapped in the face.	Plausible	The results showed a noticeable improvement.

=== Hwacha ===
The hwacha is an ancient rocket launcher built in Korea based on earlier designs of ancient Chinese firearms technology such as the fire arrows that shoots in rapid-fire sequence hundreds of rockets at once. The Build Team tested this weapon in 3 parts.

Myth statement	Status	Notes
A hwacha can fire 200 arrows at once at a range of 500 yards (460 m), and the arrows will explode on impact.	Confirmed	For the first stage, the Build Team tested whether an ancient rocket-powered arrow could travel 500 yards. They found an arrow could travel that far if enough powder is used. In the second stage, they tested whether an ancient arrow could be rigged to lethally explode. They found if packed right, an exploding arrow could inflict a mortal wound. They then moved to the third stage, where they actually built a hwacha to test if it could fire 200 arrows. During the test, the hwacha performed almost perfectly, firing 199 of the 200 arrows, which all landed near the target army. With such conclusive results as well as historical records on their side, the Build Team declared the myth confirmed.

== Episode 111 – "Motorcycle Flip" ==
- Original air date: October 29, 2008

=== Motor Bike Flip ===
This is a movie myth based on a scene in Indiana Jones and the Last Crusade.

Myth statement	Status	Notes
Throwing a wooden pole into the spokes of a motorbike's front wheel will cause it to flip.	Busted	The MythBusters first obtained a bike similar to the type used during filming. They then built a mechanized rig that could fire a pole at the same speed a human can throw one. They found that it was possible for a human to throw a pole into the wheel and cause it to stop. They then attempted the full-scale test with a moving bike. At a speed of 40 miles per hour (64 km/h), the bike snapped the wooden pole without stopping. The MythBusters then decided to redo the test, except with a steel pole. While the steel pole did stop the bike, it skidded instead of flipping, definitively busting the myth. The team analyzed the movie scene and discovered that explosives were used to flip the bike. The team then built a mortar and used it to flip the bike in an elaborate recreation of the movie scene.

=== Prison Break ===
The Build Team tested whether or not a person can escape prison (in this case, climbing down the face of the Alameda County Courthouse) by using a rope made out of...

Myth statement	Status	Notes
...toilet paper.	Plausible	Tory quickly found that toilet paper itself did not have very strong tensile strength, and he decided to twist the toilet paper into multiple yarns to create rope. After creating the rope, Tory found that it would be strong enough to support his weight. During the actual test, the toilet paper was strong enough to hold his weight, snapping only when he swung on it for a few seconds after the test, but he had difficulty keeping a firm grip on it. However, despite that issue, the Build Team declared the myth plausible.
...bedsheets.	Confirmed	Grant found that his bedsheet rope was incredibly easy and quick to make in comparison to the toilet paper and hair. Grant then tested his rope and found that the bedsheets were strong enough to hold his weight. During the actual test, Grant successfully managed to climb down the rope (though suffered from a bad case of rope burn in the process).
...hair.	Plausible	In order to make a rope, Kari braided numerous ponytails and braided them to other braids to create a rope. However, she had trouble getting her hair rope to stay together. Despite initial doubts, Kari managed to successfully climb down the hair rope. However, the Build Team only declared the myth plausible since getting the necessary amount of hair to create a rope would be extremely impractical.

== Episode 112 – "Coffin Punch" ==
- Original air date: November 5, 2008

=== What is Bulletproof? 2 ===
Adam and Jamie take fan requests and determine if the following objects are bulletproof.

Myth statement	Status	Notes
A police badge	Plausible	First, a silver star was tested, but the bullet easily penetrated it. A star on a copper shield was tested, but it also failed to stop the bullet. Finally, a star on a nickel shield was tested. It was heavily deformed, but it caught the bullet.
An MP3 player/iPod	Busted	When Adam fired an AK-47, his second shot cleanly penetrated an iPod after his first shot only grazed it. The myth came from a story about a soldier in Iraq who survived when the iPod he was wearing was shot. However, he was also wearing body armor when he got shot.
3 pizza boxes in a warming bag	Plausible	This myth is based on a story that a pizza delivery boy survived a shotgun blast by holding his warming bag in front of him. Adam and Jamie first fired birdshot at a warming bag containing three pizzas, and it stopped all but six of the pellets. Adam and Jamie then used buckshot, which easily passed through the pizzas. To see how far the buckshot would penetrate, 5 warming bags, each containing 3 pizza boxes, were placed in front of the ballistics gel dummy. Buckshot was fired at it, and the shot made it all the way to pizza 14.
Human fat	Busted	Determining that the largest layer of fat around a human (Walter Hudson) would measure 16 inches (41 cm), Adam and Jamie placed that amount of human-temperature cow fat in front of the dummy. The bullet made it all the way through the fat easily.
Human muscle	Busted	Using the measurements of a man with 3-inch (7.6 cm) pectorals and 11-inch (28 cm) biceps, Adam and Jamie placed 14 inches (36 cm) of cow muscle in front of the dummy (assuming the man placed his bicep over his pectoral and the bullet passed through them both). The muscle failed to stop the bullet.
A mixture of cornstarch and water known as Oobleck	Busted	Adam reasoned that this mixture's properties as a non-Newtonian liquid might allow it to stop a bullet. However, 6 thin bags full of the liquid failed to stop the bullet from a Glock pistol.
Aluminum cubes (compacted from soda cans) covered in a fiber-reinforced gypsum cement	Plausible	Jamie's 1st attempt at a bulletproof material stopped the bullet from a Glock pistol.
Bathroom tiles covered in a fiber-reinforced gypsum cement	Plausible	After finding out bathroom tiles on their own stopped the bullet from a Glock pistol, Jamie reinforced the tiles with the cement. This 2nd attempt at a bulletproof material stopped rounds from a 9 mm pistol, a .45 caliber handgun, and buckshot, but failed to halt deer slug or rounds from an M4 Carbine.
A belt buckle (found only on the Discovery Channel website)	Plausible	Although the bullet did pass through the belt buckle, a Deputy Sheriff who had been shot in the belt buckle and survived spoke with Jamie and Adam, saying the bullet caused a large bruise but lodged in his shirt.

=== Coffin Punch ===
Myth statement	Status	Notes
A person buried in a coffin 6 feet (1.8 m) underground can successfully punch his or her way out, then dig up to freedom (based on a scene in the movie Kill Bill).	Busted	Based on tests with mixed martial arts fighter Jon Fitch, the Build Team determined that the maximum punching force a person can generate while lying face-up in a coffin is about 1,450 lbf (6,400 N). Grant built a robot that could generate that force with a 3-inch (7.6 cm) punch, and it was placed inside a plain pine coffin. After 600 punches, the robot had created a crack in the lid, but it had not punched a hole in it. The team then placed six feet of dirt on the coffin, and again, the robot only split the lid and could not create a hole. To test what would happen if a hole could be made, the Build Team built an acrylic coffin outfitted with a trapdoor and a sliding panel to let dirt in. First, Tory entered the coffin, and 2 feet (61 cm) of dirt were placed on him. He was able to dig himself out. When Grant repeated this experiment with 6 feet of dirt, the dirt entered the coffin so fast and filled it so completely that there was no way anyone could escape. Based on these results, the myth was declared busted.

== Episode 113 – "End With a Bang" ==
- Original air date: November 12, 2008

=== Hit the Ground Running ===
Myth statement	Status	Notes
It is better to hit the ground running.	Busted	The Build Team opted to apply this myth to running, then to riding a bicycle, and finally to driving a small car. For running, Kari, Tory, and Grant each ran a distance of 30 feet (9.1 m), first from a standstill, then dropping from a trapeze bar while running in air, and finally riding a zipline to the starting line while running in air. Dropping from the trapeze bar was barely faster than starting from a standstill, while riding the zipline was slower. For the bicycle, Tory made a rig that allowed him to drop the rear wheel while spinning onto the ground. This made the bike unstable and was slower than a dead start. Finally, Kari drove a car 300 feet (91 m) from a standstill, and then the team raised the front wheels off the ground while Kari revved the engine before dropping. Once again, the car was faster when driving from a dead start. Declaring the myth busted, the Build Team theorized that traction was key; unlike with a dead start, where the runner already has traction to build up and maintain speed, hitting the ground running is the opposite, trying to gain traction while at speed, and those few moments needed to gain traction slow the runner down enough not to be faster than if the runner started from a dead start.

=== You Can't Polish Poop ===
Myth statement	Status	Notes
It is not possible to polish poop.	Busted	Adam and Jamie first visited the zoo to obtain a variety of feces to try to polish. Poop collected, they tried to pick the most polishable candidates, and then baked them to remove the moisture. Adam tried to shine his poop with a buffing wheel, while Jamie's tactic of applying a furniture polish caused a philosophical disagreement between the two. Adam eventually brought in an outside expert to teach them dorodango, a Japanese art form that allows a practitioner to apply a shine to dirt by using nothing but water and physical effort. Applying this technique, Adam and Jamie were both able to polish balls of poop without using any foreign materials as judged by a gloss meter, exceeding a standard of 70 gloss units for high gloss.

=== Better to End with a Bang ===
Myth statement	Status	Notes
It is better to end with a bang.	Confirmed	To test this myth, Adam and Jamie tried different ways of ending the episode: first with a bang, and secondly with a slow burn. For the bang, primer cord was wrapped around Jamie's moped, and Adam added bottles of gasoline. The explosion utterly destroyed the moped. For a burn, Jamie mixed over 1,000 pounds (450 kg) of thermite, intending to use it to cut an SUV in half. While the SUV was not completely severed, the thermite burned through most of the vehicle, and both Adam and Jamie enjoyed the destruction. Adam preferred the bang more, but Jamie liked the burn. They decided to put the verdict of the myth to the fans on their website for voting. As of June 2009, more fans liked Adam's bang (59.8%) than Jamie's burn (40.2%).

== Episode SP12 – "Viewer Special Threequel" ==
- Original air date: November 19, 2008

=== Bamboo Torture ===
Myth statement	Status	Notes
It is possible to use bamboo as a form of torture because it will pierce human skin and then grow through the body.	Plausible	Because the experiment would last several days and be exposed to the sun, Adam and Jamie decided they did not want to use an animal carcass. First, they got some meat and used a force gauge to determine how much pressure was needed to puncture the skin. They discovered that it took the same amount of force to pierce a torso made out of ballistic gelatin. They then obtained some bamboo shoots, placed them in a greenhouse they constructed on the M5 roof, and then placed the gel torso over the bamboo. After only three days, a couple of bamboo shoots had pierced the torso's back. However, Adam was disappointed the bamboo did not make it all the way through the torso. It appeared the sun may have melted the gel, so Adam and Jamie got a mannequin torso, filled it with gel, and cut only some small holes in the front and back for the bamboo to move. This time, the bamboo grew right through the torso and rose to a height of about ten feet. Both Adam and Jamie agreed this would be extremely painful for a person to endure and declared the myth plausible.

=== Alkali Metal Mayhem ===
Myth statement	Status	Notes
Alkali metals dropped into a bathtub filled with water will create a huge explosion.	Busted	Tory, Grant, and Kari went to the Alameda County bomb range to test the myth, which is featured in an episode of the British TV show Brainiac: Science Abuse. The Brainiac experiment purported to show two grams of rubidium and caesium dropped into a bathtub filled with water causing an explosion as large as could be caused by a hand grenade. However, the MythBusters could not get the rubidium or caesium dropped into a flush toilet to cause an explosion, even though they used 25 grams (0.88 oz) of each metal, over ten times more than the quantity used in the Brainiac experiment. Instead, the chemical reaction caused a brief flame, as well as the release of hydrogen gas before fizzling out. The team also tried two other alkali metals: sodium and potassium. They dropped 2.5 kilograms (5.5 lb) of each metal into a bathtub. The violent reactions were so intense that they cracked the bathtub but far from enough to disintegrate it as a hand grenade could do, and the myth was declared busted. The discrepancies between the MythBusters and Brainiac results arose from forged results; see Brainiac: Science Abuse#Forged results.

=== Brandy Warmer ===
Myth statement	Status	Notes
St. Bernard rescue dogs carry casks of brandy because the alcohol enables a hypothermic person to survive longer.	Busted	To test this myth, Adam and Jamie swallowed internal thermometers that contained tiny transmitters that sent their core body temperature to a digital display. They then used a thermographic camera to record the temperature of each other's face and hands. After recording their temperatures at M5, they went to a frozen food warehouse and sat in a room kept at 0 °F (−18 °C). Not long after sitting in the room, they started feeling the heat leave their extremities and measured their temperatures again. They discovered that while their faces and hands were indeed much colder, their core body temperatures were actually higher than when they were outside the freezer. They then called in Bob, a St. Bernard carrying a cask of brandy. Adam and Jamie drank the brandy and measured their temperatures again. They discovered their face and hands were warmer but their core body temperatures were dropping fast. Adam and Jamie declared the myth busted for this reason. They did, however, find some positive aspects to having a St. Bernard bring them brandy: The alcohol caused their blood vessels to widen, resulting in more blood going to the extremities. This made it less likely they would get frostbite. They also discovered they felt a lot better after drinking. Jamie also reported he felt warmer while snuggling with Bob. They concluded that if rescue was imminent, it would be a good idea to drink the brandy, but if rescue was uncertain, it would be a bad idea to drink alcohol because it would make a person die more quickly. The MythBusters also pointed out that the idea of St. Bernards roaming the mountains with casks of brandy around their necks is in itself a myth.

=== Exploding Piano ===
Myth statement	Status	Notes
Pianos will explode if set on fire as the tension holding the strings in place is released.	Busted	Back at the bomb range, Tory, Grant, and Kari placed some firewood under a baby grand piano and set it on fire. Instead of exploding, the piano slowly burned. The MythBusters found that the piano's disintegration did not cause the strings to pop; instead, the frame and strings expanded from the heat, which slowly released the stored energy over a long period of time rather than all at once in a sudden explosion. To end with a suitable explosion, the resident bomb expert performed his "MythBusters Concerto in C-4" and obliterated the piano's remains.
