= Anthony Kelly (martial artist) =

Australian martial artist (born 1964)

- Born: April 1964 (age 62); Armidale, New South Wales, Australia

Other information
- Occupation: Martial artist
- Notable club: New England Martial Arts Centre
- Website: anthonykelly.net.au

Anthony Kelly (born 1964) is an Australian martial artist and world record holder. As of 2024, Kelly holds 60 Guinness World Records, the highest number for an Australian. He has featured on numerous Guinness World Records TV programs, as well as TV shows including MythBusters and both the 2000 and 2019 series of Ripley's Believe It or Not!.

== Early life ==
Kelly was born and raised in Armidale, New South Wales, and attended O'Connor Catholic College. He has five older brothers. Kelly became interested in martial arts as a child after watching fights by Bruce Lee and Muhammad Ali, and began training in 1978 so he could defend himself after being bullied in school. His father died when Kelly was 16, and Kelly attributes a card his father left for his 21st birthday which read "Try to be the best you can be. Make sure your life is worth living", as motivation for his world record attempts.

== Martial arts and Guinness World Records ==
Kelly has black belts in 20 different martial arts styles. He first caught an arrow at a martial arts demonstration in 2001, saying he got the idea from watching the feat performed in the film The Last Dragon. He learned how to catch them within a week. Kelly recorded himself catching arrows and sent the footage to Guinness World Records, hoping to create a world record. Guinness flew him to Madrid six weeks later to perform the feat at one of their events. Kelly states that the experience changed his life. He has since been referred to as the "Arrow Catcher" and also called a ninja.

Kelly holds Guinness World Records including the record for the most arrows caught in 2 minutes which he obtained in 2001, catching 10 whilst standing 13 metres (43 ft) from the archer. Kelly got the idea to also start trying to catch paintballs from one of his martial arts students who owned a Paintball field. In 2003, he obtained the record for the most caught in 2 minutes whilst blindfolded, catching 11. By 2009, Kelly was Australia's most successful Guinness World Records holder, with 18 titles.

In 2010, Kelly broke the world record for the most tennis balls caught in one minute live on the Guinness World Records television series, Australia Smashes Guinness World Records, catching 43. That year he also broke the record for most tennis balls caught in one minute whilst blindfolded, catching 11. On 'Guinness World Records Day' in November 2012 he obtained the record for the most targets hit by a blowgun in 60 seconds, hitting 23, and in 2014, he obtained the record for catching the most spears shot with a speargun underwater, catching 10. In 2018, he achieved the record for the highest arrow shot into the air and then caught.

Kelly also attempts and holds non-martial arts records, such as for the most coaching qualifications across multiple sports, and the tallest stack of hats worn by a person, which he states was done to promote the use of hats to children after he had a skin cancer removed from his face. He also once failed to break the record for the most Ferrero Rochers eaten in one minute while being filmed for TV, admitting that he had thought the record would be easy and had not bothered to practice. By November 2024, he had increased his number of Guinness World Records to 60, still the highest number for an Australian.

Kelly has been injured several times during world record attempts, including internal bruising and broken fingers from attempting to catch tennis balls, an arrow going into his arm on a TV show in Amsterdam, and one through a finger on Guinness World Records's first TV show in India. He was once hired by the New South Wales Police Force as a forensic martial arts consultant in a murder case.

== Television appearances ==
Kelly appeared in a 2003 episode of Ripley's Believe It or Not!, catching paintballs shot at him. He appeared in "Ninjas 2", a 2008 episode of the television series MythBusters, in order to test whether an arrow could be caught in mid-air, whether a ninja can deflect an arrow with a sword and kill the archer before they can reload, and whether a one-inch punch could render somebody unconscious. While Kelly is able to catch arrows, he could not do so under full-combat conditions, so the MythBusters declared that myth "busted". Kelly was able to deflect an arrow with a sword and "kill" Adam Savage before he could reload, thereby confirming that myth. Given the amount of force Kelly could generate with his one-inch punch, the MythBusters team declared it is plausible that someone could be knocked out with the punch. He appeared on "Steel Face", a 2013 episode of Stan Lee's Superhumans, to demonstrate his reflexes at catching various objects. Kelly appeared on the episode "Great Obsessions" of the 2019 series Ripley's Believe It or Not!, where he was shown breaking the record for the highest arrow shot into the air and then caught. He has also appeared on an episode of Time Warp. Kelly was the first person to perform live on Guinness World Records television series in both India and China.

== Personal life ==
Kelly states he only eats meat and potatoes, and has never eaten fruit or other vegetables in his life. He attributes his fast reflexes to a combination of genetics and his unusual diet. As of 2014, Kelly was working as a support officer at Armidale High School, and also taught kung fu and reaction training at Duval High School.
