= Bamboo torture =

Torture method

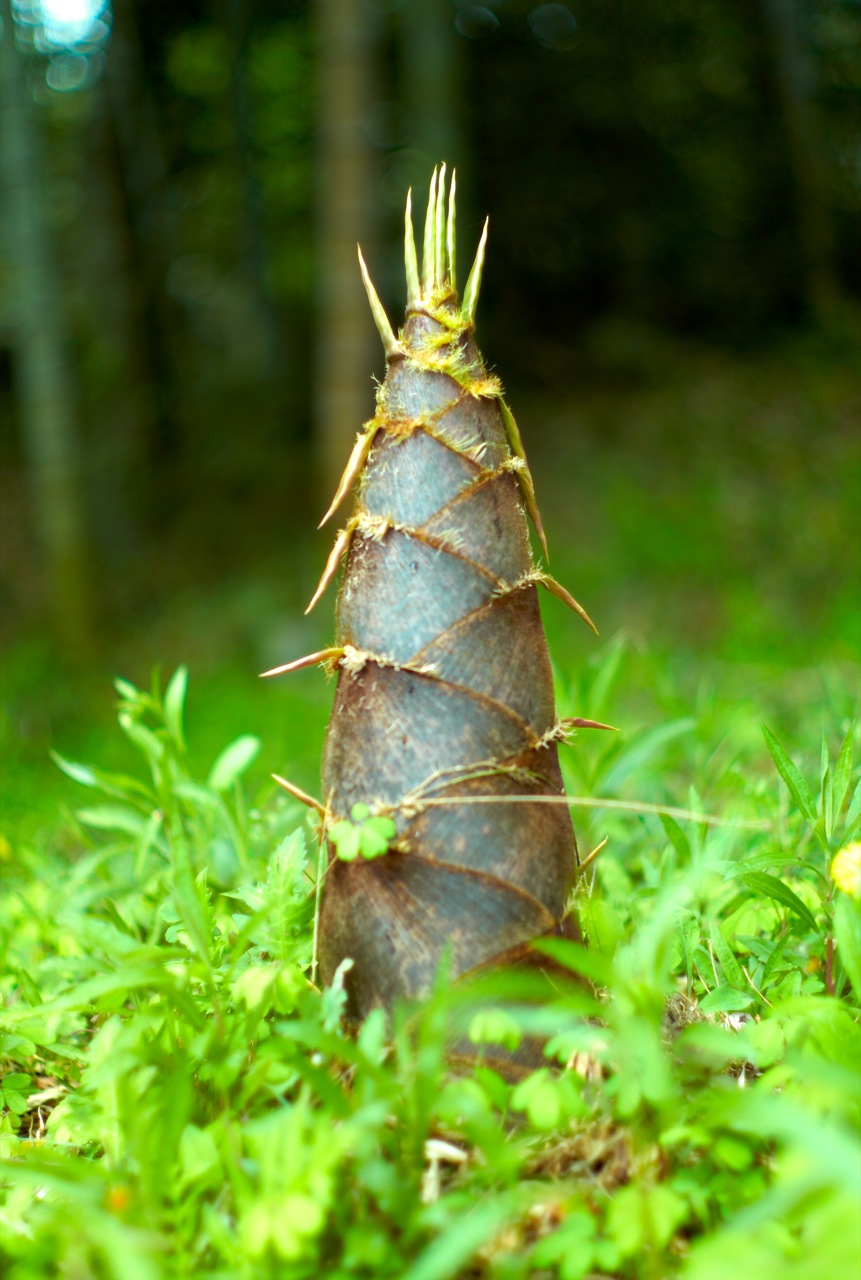
Bamboo sprout. Some species can grow as fast as 4 cm per hour.

Bamboo torture is a form of torture and execution where a bamboo shoot grows through the body of a victim. It was reportedly used in East and South Asian countries such as China, India, and especially Japan, but claims of its usage lack reliable evidence.

== Recorded usage ==
A "Madras civilian", in his travel description from 1820s India, referred to this use of bamboo as a well-known punishment in Ceylon. The use of live trees impaling people as they grew was recorded in the 19th century, when the Siamese used nipah palm sprouts in the same way as bamboo torture on the Malays during the 1821 Siamese invasion of Kedah, among other punishments.

After World War II, stories circulated of Japanese soldiers using "bamboo torture" upon Allied prisoners of war, securely tying the victim in place above a young bamboo shoot. Over several days, the sharp, fast-growing shoot would first puncture, then completely penetrate the victim's body, eventually emerging through the other side. In her Hakka Soul memoir, Chinese poet and author Woon-Ping Chin mentions the "bamboo torture" as one of the tortures that locals believed the Japanese performed on POWs.

The cast of the TV program MythBusters investigated bamboo torture in a 2008 episode and found that a bamboo shoot can penetrate through several inches of ballistic gelatin in three days. This confirmed the ability of a shoot to grow through materials like human flesh, though records of its actual use remain a matter of historical debate.
