= Beer goggles =

Impact of alcoholic inebriation on interpersonal attraction

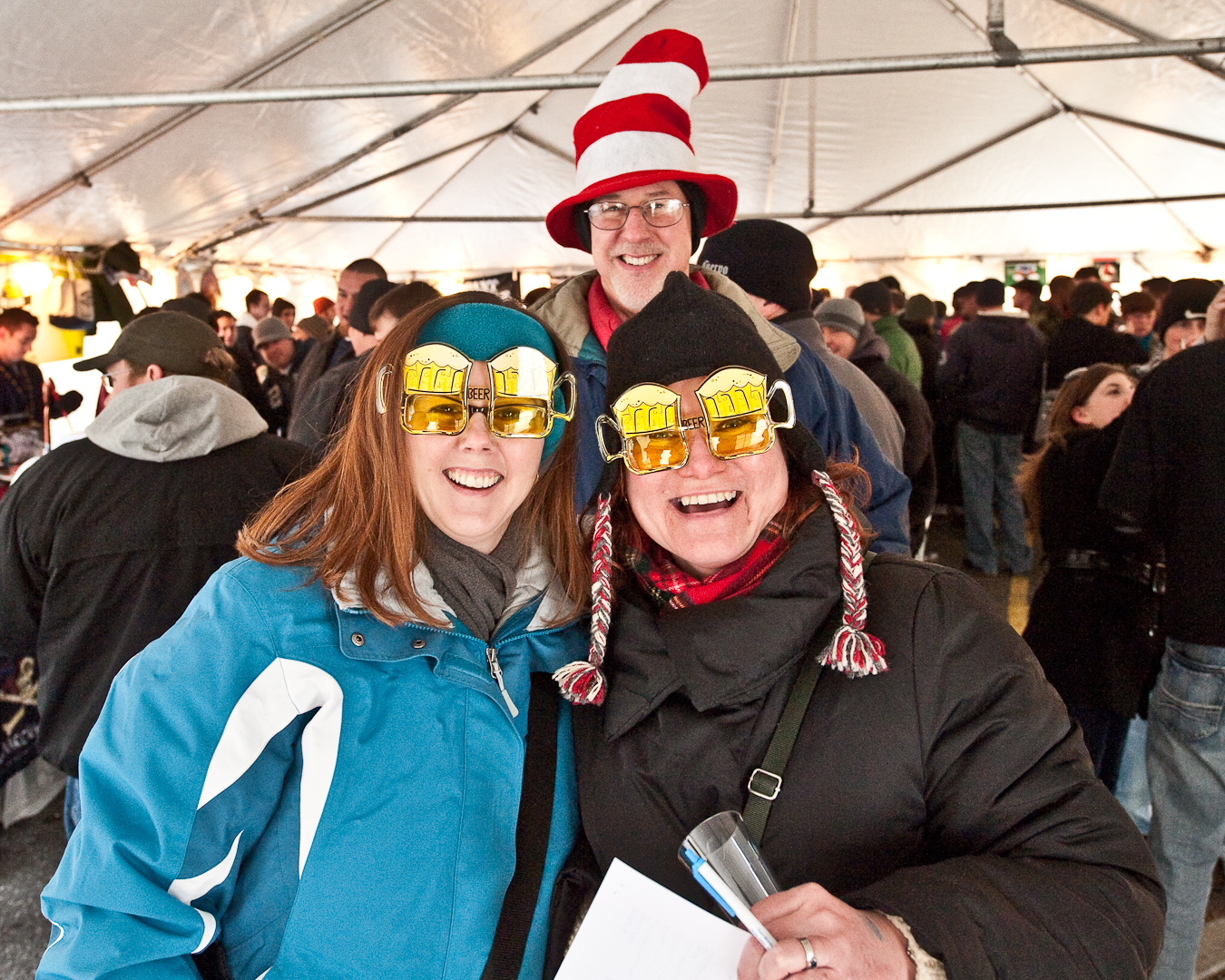
"Beer goggles" as an accessory alluding to the term

The term "beer goggles" is the phenomenon that people find other people more attractive after having consumed alcohol. The term is especially used for people who, when sober, will otherwise not be found as relatively attractive or attractive at all.

== History ==
The term "beer goggles" was first coined in the United States in the 1980s by male university students. In addition, the first printed version of the phrase was found in Playboy magazine in January 1987 titled "The Let's Get Practical Fashion Award: To Georgetown for its beer goggles". By the 1990s it had spread to the United Kingdom and is found in the Evening Chronicle stating "... but by the time I had my beer goggles on. After the ale I'd supped, they were looking like super-models". Lastly, the term "beer goggles" is found in the Merriam-Webster Dictionary as a plural noun defined as "the effects of alcohol thought of metaphorically as a pair of goggles that alter a person's perceptions especially by making others appear more attractive than they actually are.

== Science behind alcohol and perceived attraction ==
Drinking alcohol can have several effects on both the body and the brain. These effects include but are not limited to impaired judgement, lowered social inhibitions, poor decision-making, aggressive behaviors and risky sexual behavior.

First, alcohol enters the bloodstream through the gastrointestinal tract and the amount absorbed varies based on several factors such as genetic makeup, weight, muscle-to-fat ratio, food present and any medical conditions.

Once in the bloodstream, alcohol acts as a central nervous system depressant meaning it slows down how fast brain cells and nerves communicate with the rest of the body. This impacts both the limbic system and the prefrontal cortex. The limbic system produces emotions such as fear or anxiety. This reduction in the limbic system is why people feel less socially awkward when drinking. The pre-frontal cortex is responsible for cognitive processing such as reasoning and judgement. This reduction in the pre-frontal cortex function is why people's inhibitions and judgements are lowered. The combination of lowered inhibitions and impaired judgement can lead people to think when under the influence that one is attractive.

Lastly, there are several studies demonstrating that drinking increases risky sexual behavior, the likelihood of having casual partners and less consistent condom use. This is because alcohol also decreases the function of both the cerebral cortex and frontal lobes. One of the functions of the cerebral cortex is receiving information from one's senses and environment while the frontal lobe is responsible for voluntary movement. Suppression of the cerebral cortex leads to lowered inhibitions while suppression of the frontal lobes leads to less control of one's emotions or urges causing potential aggression.

== Research ==
There are many studies about whether "beer goggles" is real; that is, if drinking truly makes people perceive other people to be more attractive.

One of the first studies on the topic of "beer goggles" was done in 2003 which took 80 heterosexual college students to a bar, served drinks and then showed them pictures of people of the opposite sex. It was found that compared to the sober group, those that were served alcohol found people on average more attractive.

To explore whether the "beer goggles" phenomenon was only found in humans, researchers at Pennsylvania State University explored mating habits in fruit flies exposed to alcohol. The study concluded that flies who were chronically exposed to alcohol were less choosy when mating with female fruit flies and more forward than those who were not exposed to alcohol.

In 2013, a study titled "Beauty in the eye of the beer holder" was done to measure how alcohol consumption affected self-perception of attractiveness, and it was found that those who drank alcohol and were told they drank alcohol gave themselves more positive self ratings than those who did not.

Another study in 2012 analyzed the effects of combining alcohol with cigarettes and found that this enhances the "beer goggles" effect, causing the highest ratings of attraction compared to those who had just consumed alcohol.

Later on a study conducted in 2014, found that drinking alcohol can affect perception of attractiveness in both animate and inanimate objects. The study consisted of 103 volunteers (both men and women) to drink either alcoholic or non-alcoholic beverages, and then had to rate both faces and landscapes. Those who drank the alcoholic beverages rated on average higher for both the faces and landscapes than those in the non-alcoholic beverage group.

The "beer goggles" effect was further investigated in 2015 in the opposite direction: evaluating the attractiveness of those who drank versus those who did not. It was found that people perceived those who drank a low dose of alcohol as the most attractive compared to those who drank nothing at all or drank a high dose.

Conversely, a study in 2016 was one of the first to refute the "beer goggles" phenomenon. The participants were divided into four groups: one that drank alcohol, one that were told they drank alcohol, one that did not drink alcohol, and one that were told they did not drink alcohol. The results conveyed that those who were told they consumed alcohol but did not rated attractiveness higher than those who did not drink alcohol. These findings illustrate that the "beer goggles" effect could be more psychological and that people thinking they drank acted as a placebo.

According to a recent study, findings by Bowdring and Prof Michael Sayette of the University of Pittsburgh showed that although beer goggles might not have appeared as a result of drinking, respondents were more inclined to express an interest in engaging with attractive individuals.

== Criticism ==
Recent studies outside laboratory settings find that the "beer goggles" effect, a connection between attractiveness perceptions and level of drunkenness, was not found as consistently. Other studies do not necessarily believe people find people more attractive, however that people are just more likely to act on desire when consuming alcohol.

Most of the studies conclude that it is important to recognize many confounding variables such as the amount of alcohol consumed, environment, mindset before drinking, relationship status and sexual arousal that all may play a role in ratings of perceived attractiveness.

In addition, trends are showing that more people from Generation Z are opting not to drink alcohol at all with around a 20% to 28% increase in sober individuals in the last decade in the United States. They are known as the most sober curious generation yet. Researchers are now studying how this sober curious movement is impacting the dating landscape and whether this "beer goggles" effect will soon be less prevalent.

== Bibliography ==
- Attwood, A. S., Penton-Voak, I. S., Goodwin, C., & Munafò, M. R. (2012). Effects of acute nicotine and alcohol on the rating of attractiveness in social smokers and alcohol drinkers. Drug and Alcohol Dependence, 125(1–2), 43–48.
- Bègue, L., Bushman, B. J., Zerhouni, O., Subra, B., & Ourabah, M. (2012). "Beauty is in the eye of the beer holder": People who think they are drunk also think they are attractive. British Journal of Psychology, 104(2), 225–234.
- Chen, X., Wang, X., Yang, D., & Chen, Y. (2014). The Moderating Effect of Stimulus Attractiveness on the Effect of Alcohol Consumption on Attractiveness Ratings. Alcohol and Alcoholism, 49(5), 515–519.
- Lee, H.-G., Kim, Y.-C., Dunning, J. S., & Han, K.-A. (2008). Recurring Ethanol Exposure Induces Disinhibited Courtship in Drosophila. PLoS ONE, 3(1), e1391.
- Maynard, O. M., Skinner, A. L., Troy, D. M., Attwood, A. S., & Munafò, M. R. (2015). Association of Alcohol Consumption with Perception of Attractiveness in a Naturalistic Environment. Alcohol and Alcoholism, 51(2), 142–147.
- Van Den Abbeele, J., Penton-Voak, I. S., Attwood, A. S., Stephen, I. D., & Munafò, M. R. (2015). Increased Facial Attractiveness Following Moderate, but not High, Alcohol Consumption. Alcohol and Alcoholism, 50(3), 296–301.
