= One-inch punch =

Punching technique

- Traditional Chinese: 寸勁
- Simplified Chinese: 寸劲
- Literal meaning: super cùn
Transcriptions
Standard Mandarin
- Hanyu Pinyin: cùnjìng
Yue: Cantonese
- Jyutping: cyun^{3} ging^{6}

The one-inch punch is a punching exercise from Chinese martial arts performed at a range of 0–15 cm (0–6 in). The one-inch punch was popularized by actor and martial artist Bruce Lee. It is purported to improve punching power and technique.

== History ==
The one-inch punch is present in various styles of Southern Chinese martial arts. As a general rule, Southern Chinese martial arts rely mostly on hand techniques from very close quarters (as opposed to Northern Chinese martial arts which focus more on kicking techniques from medium to long distances). Because the Southern styles martial artists were often fighting nose-to-nose with their opponents, they had to learn a way to deal out punishing blows even while almost touching their target.

The one-inch punch is a skill which uses fa jin (translated as explosive power) to generate tremendous amounts of impact force at extremely close distances. This "burst" effect had been common in Neijia (internal martial art) forms. When performing this one-inch punch the practitioner stands with their fist very close to the target (the distance depends on the skill of the practitioner, usually from closer than 6 inches, or 15 cm). The timed chaining of multiple muscle groups contributes to the punching power while being imperceptible to the attacker. It is a common misconception that "one-inch punches" utilize a snapping of the wrist. The target in such demonstrations vary, sometimes it is a fellow practitioner holding a phone book on the chest, sometimes wooden boards can be broken.

The one-inch punch was made popular in the west when demonstrated by Bruce Lee at the Long Beach International Karate Championships in 1964. Bruce Lee learned the technique from his Wing Chun training in Hong Kong. He used the art of Wing Chun as his basis of the art he founded, Jeet Kune Do. According to witnesses who attended the event, such as Benny Urquidez (later a pioneer of American full-contact kickboxing), Lee's one-inch punch sent a 245 lb (111 kg) man flying back.

In the television show MythBusters episode "The One Inch Punch", the technique was tested quantitatively using a force gauge. For comparison, it was matched against a conventional punch thrown with a full wind-up by Jamie Hyneman. The one-inch punch was delivered by Anthony Kelly, a martial arts expert and master instructor who had learned the technique from one of Bruce Lee's students. The conventional punch measured 325 pounds-force (1,450 N) while the one-inch punch measured 153 pounds-force (680 N). In the absence of a safe method of testing against a human being, the hosts deemed it "plausible" as a combat technique, if the user had proper training and experience.

In the television show Stan Lee's Superhumans, the Shaolin monk Shi Yan Ming demonstrated his one-inch punch on a crash test dummy. The testing showed it was 1.7 times more injurious than a 30 mph (48 km/h) car crash with modern safety features.

The one-inch punch is featured in the film Kill Bill: Volume 2. The lead character, "The Bride", is shown training for it during several flashback scenes, then using it to escape from a coffin after being buried alive.

In the film, DragonBall Z: Resurrection F, The Protagonist, Son Goku, uses this punch on the movie's villain, Frieza.

== Notes ==
=== References ===
- Bruce Lee's One Inch Punch
- The One-Inch-Punch, a critical view
