= Antifanaticism =

1853 novel by Martha Haines Butt

Antifanaticism: A Tale of the South
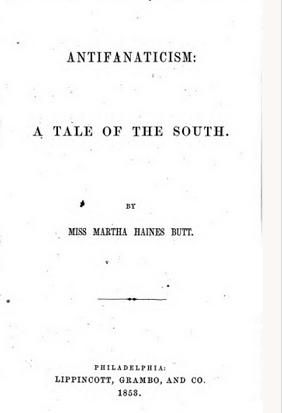
- Author: Martha Haines Butt
- Language: English
- Genre: Plantation literature
- Publisher: Lippincott, Grambo & Co
- Publication date: 1853
- Publication place: United States
- Media type: Print (Hardcover & Paperback) & E-book
- Pages: c.300 pp (May change depending on the publisher and the size of the text)

Antifanaticism: A Tale of the South is an 1853 plantation fiction novel by Martha Haines Butt.

== Overview ==
Antifanaticism is one of several examples of the plantation literature genre that appeared in reaction to the anti-slavery novel Uncle Tom's Cabin by Harriet Beecher Stowe, which had been criticised as inaccurately depicting slaveholders and slavery in general.

Authors from the Southern United States sought to rectify this through their own series of pro-slavery novels. Examples of these include: Aunt Phillis's Cabin (1852), Uncle Robin, in His Cabin in Virginia, and Tom Without One in Boston (1853) and The Planter's Northern Bride (1854).

Butt explains in her novel that Antifanaticism is her first novel, and invites Stowe herself to the south to see that the events of the book, though fictional, are based on reality rather than fiction, which she accuses Stowe of doing in the creation of Uncle Tom's Cabin.

=== Title ===
The term Antifanaticism in the book's title is a neologism coined by Butt, prefixing the term Fanaticism with anti- (from the Greek αντί, meaning "against") to mean "against Fanaticism" (i.e. Abolitionism).

== Plot ==
The story takes place somewhere in Virginia, and depicts a group of white plantation owners who put charity towards their black slaves before the harvesting and selling of the cotton on their own plantations, as well as successfully converting several troublesome abolitionists into friendly socialites through a process referred to throughout the novel as "Southern hospitality".

== Publication history ==
Antifanaticism was first published in 1853 by Lippincott, Grambo & Co, who had previously published the anti-Tom novel Aunt Phillis's Cabin by Mary Henderson Eastman in the previous year, and would go on to publish Mr. Frank, the Underground Mail-Agent alongside Antifanaticism.

== Reception ==
Elizabeth R. Varon later criticized the book's writing in her 1998 book We Mean to Be Counted, commenting that Butt had neither the skill nor the ambiguity of Eastman's Aunt Phillis's Cabin.
