= Ellen; or, The Fanatic's Daughter =

1860 novel by Mrs. V.G. Cowdin

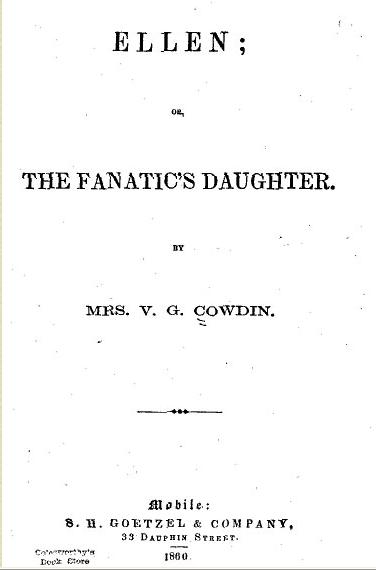
- Title page of the original 1860 text
- Author: Mrs. V.G. Cowdin
- Language: English
- Genre: Plantation literature
- Publisher: S.H. Goetzel & Co.
- Publication date: 1860
- Publication place: United States
- Media type: Print (Hardcover & Paperback) & E-book
- Pages: c.300 pp (May change depending on the publisher and the size of the text)

Ellen; or, The Fanatic's Daughter is an 1860 plantation fiction novel written by Mrs. V.G. Cowdin.

== Overview ==
Ellen is one of several examples of Anti-Tom literature, a literary subgenre that emerged in the Southern United States in response to the 1852 novel Uncle Tom's Cabin by Harriet Beecher Stowe, which had been criticised in the South as inaccurately depicting slaveholding and the attitudes of slaveowners in general.

Like other anti-Tom novels such as The Planter's Northern Bride by Caroline Lee Hentz, Ellen acts largely as a criticism of abolitionism rather than a defence of slavery, highlighting the corruption within abolitionist movements such as the Underground Railroad.

== Plot ==
The story follows Ellen, the daughter of a Southern mother from Louisiana and a Northern father. Ellen's father quickly leaves his family shortly after the birth of his daughter, and it is discovered shortly afterward that he is an abolitionist.

Ellen, now older and wishing to find her father, sets off into the Northern United States where she discovers numerous atrocities being committed by the Northerners that far outrank the South in terms of oppression and cruelty. All Northern women are portrayed as foul-tempered shrews who abuse their white servants worse than black slaves, and all men are portrayed as being scheming, greedy capitalists.

It is during her travels that Ellen comes across Parson Blake, an evil abolitionist priest who encourages abolitionism more to steal Southern wealth rather than to aid runaway slaves. Blake attempts several sinister schemes to deter Ellen from returning home, but Ellen escapes his clutches and returns home safely to Louisiana.

== Publication history ==
Ellen was first published in novelised form by S.H. Goetzel & Co. of Mobile, Alabama in 1860. Reaction to the novel is unrecorded, although one surviving copy of the work – currently in the care of the University of Virginia – bears a stamp indicating that the novel was on sale in Boston.

Ellen was among the last anti-Tom novels to be published, with the genre dying out by the end of 1860.
