= The Ebony Idol =

1860 novel by G. M. Flanders

- Author: Mrs. G.M. Flanders
- Language: English
- Genre: Plantation literature
- Publisher: D. Appleton & Company
- Publication date: 1860
- Publication place: United States
- Media type: Print (hardback & paperback) & E-book
- Pages: c. 300 pp (May change depending on the publisher and the size of the text)

The Ebony Idol is a plantation literature novel by G. M. Flanders, first published in 1860. It is one of several pro-slavery novels written in the Southern United States in response to the 1852 abolitionist novel Uncle Tom's Cabin by Harriet Beecher Stowe.

The majority of these works, such as Aunt Phillis's Cabin (1852) and The Planter's Northern Bride (1854), attacked Stowe for her allegedly inaccurate depiction of slavery, and criticized other abolitionists.

== Plot ==
The novel takes place in the fictional town of Minton in New England, inhabited entirely by white people and where colored people are almost unknown.

The local pastor, Reverend Cary, adopts abolitionism and arranges for a freedom seeker named Caesar to reside in the town. Caesar acts as an "ebony idol" for the respect and sympathy of the people of Minton.

Cary's social experiment, however, has disastrous consequences. Caesar's presence splits Minton between pro- and anti-slavery factions, and Cary questions his motives for hosting Caesar. Practically overnight, Minton changes from a quiet paradise into a violent slum.

In time, an enslaver from the Southern United States visits Cary, who, under pressure from the townsfolk, agrees that Caesar should leave Minton to be enslaved and work on a plantation, restoring Minton to its original, idyllic condition.

== Publication history ==
The Ebony Idol was published in 1860 by D. Appleton & Co. of New York City. Appleton & Co. had been responsible for the publication of several previous anti-Tom novels, including The Lofty and the Lowly, or Good in All and None All Good by Maria J. McIntosh in 1853.
