= Life at the South; or, "Uncle Tom's Cabin" as It Is =

1852 novel by William L.G. Smith

Life at the South; or, "Uncle Tom's Cabin" As It Is: Being Narratives, Scenes, and Incidents in the Real "Life of the Lowly"
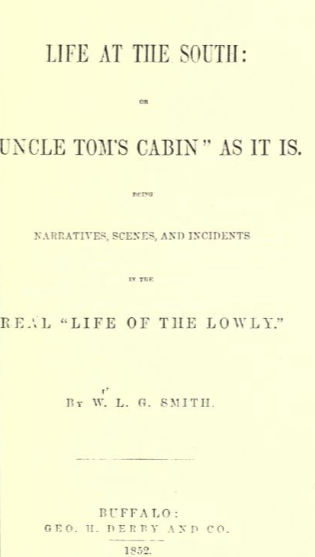
- Title page for Life at the South; or, "Uncle Tom's Cabin" as It Is (1852)
- Author: W.L.G. Smith
- Language: English
- Genre: Plantation literature
- Publisher: Geoffrey H. Derby & Co.
- Publication date: 1852
- Publication place: United States
- Media type: Print

Life at the South; or, "Uncle Tom's Cabin" As It Is (also known by its shorter title of Uncle Tom's Cabin As It Is) is an 1852 plantation fiction novel written by William L.G. Smith.

== Overview ==
Uncle Tom's Cabin As It Is is an example of the anti-Tom or pro-slavery plantation literature genre, novels that were produced following the publication of the bestselling Uncle Tom's Cabin by abolitionist Harriet Beecher Stowe. Critics felt Stowe's work inaccurately depicted or otherwise exaggerated the evils of slaveholding.

Smith's novel follows the general pattern of most anti-Tom novels: a story of loyal slaves convinced to leave their benign masters by abolitionists who did not really care about their welfare. Like several of the genre, Smith also references Uncle Tom's Cabin throughout, both in title and in plot. Other anti-Tom novels followed similar strategies, such as Uncle Robin, in His Cabin in Virginia, and Tom Without One in Boston (1853).

Smith's novel features a dedication to the southern American statesman Henry Clay from Kentucky, as an advocate of the American Colonization Society, which promoted resettlement of free blacks from the United States to Africa. Clay had died earlier in 1852, the year the novel was published.

== Plot ==
Smith's novel begins on a plantation in Virginia, owned by the benevolent and kindly Mr. Erskine. Among his slaves is Uncle Tom (Smith's version of Stowe's character), who is convinced to run away by an abolitionist schoolteacher from the North. The teacher is portrayed as envious of the prosperity of Erskine and seeks to ruin him by convincing his slaves to desert the plantation.

As Tom's journey continues, the man realizes that the abolitionists who are "helping" him wish to enslave him for their own ends. After being abused and mistreated in Buffalo, Illinois, after attempting to return home, Tom finally ends up in Canada. Erskine is waiting there to "rescue" Tom from his freedom and to take him back to "good old Virginia".

== In other works ==
- The main title of Smith's novel – Life at the South; or "Uncle Tom's Cabin" As It Is – resembles the full title of another anti-Tom novel, Aunt Phillis's Cabin: or, Southern Life As It Is by Mary Henderson Eastman, which was published the same year as Smith's novel. Eastman's novel was a bestseller, with tens of thousands of copies in circulation. Both novels likely based their titles on American Slavery As It Is: Testimony of a Thousand Witnesses, an 1839 volume co-authored by abolitionists Theodore Dwight Weld and the Grimké sisters. This had also been a source for some of Stowe's material for Uncle Tom's Cabin.
- Life at the South, a Companion to Uncle Tom's Cabin (1852), was an anti-Tom novel with a similar name, written by C. H. Wiley.
