= Tit for Tat (novel) =

1856 anonymously-written novel

- Author: Anonymous (credited as "A Lady of New Orleans")
- Language: English
- Genre: Plantation literature
- Publisher: Garret & Co.
- Publication date: 1856
- Publication place: United States
- Media type: Print (Hardcover & Paperback) & E-book
- Pages: c.300 pp (May change depending on the publisher and the size of the text)

Tit for Tat is an 1856 novel written anonymously by "A Lady of New Orleans".

== Overview ==
Tit for Tat is one of several examples of plantation literature that emerged in the Southern United States in response to the 1852 novel Uncle Tom's Cabin by Harriet Beecher Stowe, which had been criticised in the south for inaccurately depicting the practices of slavery and the relationship(s) between master and slave.

Tit for Tat, however, is an isolated example of the genre where, instead of defending slavery or attacking abolitionism like other works of the genre, it attempts to attack the enthusiasm for Uncle Tom's Cabin upon its initial release in the United Kingdom. Thus, Tit for Tat could be seen as attempting to promote anti-British sentiment in the United States rather than promoting slavery.

== Plot ==
The novel follows Totty, a young urchin living in poverty in Victorian-era London. Totty is stolen from his family whilst young, and forced to work as the apprentice of a sadistic chimney sweep. Totty's suffering is ignored by the philanthropists, who are so concerned with the welfare of black slaves in America that they fail to notice that they have simply replaced their own slavery with child labour.

== Publication history ==
Tit for Tat was first published in its entirety by Garret & Co. in 1856, but unlike other anti-Tom novels such as Aunt Phillis's Cabin or The Planter's Northern Bride, the novel has not been republished in the modern day.
