= Frank Freeman's Barber Shop =

1852 novel by Baynard Rush Hall

Frank Freeman's Barber Shop: A Tale
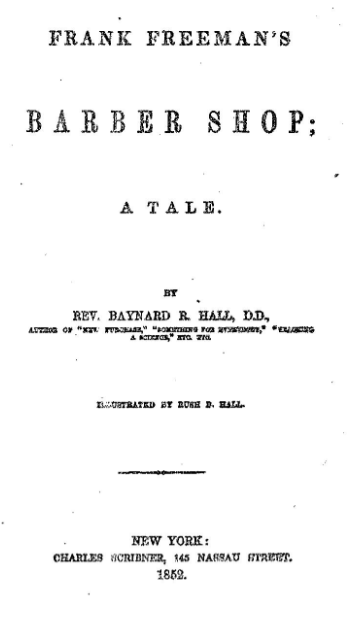
- Title page for Frank Freeman's Barber Shop (1852)
- Author: Baynard Rush Hall
- Language: English
- Genre: Plantation literature
- Publisher: Charles Scribner Publishers
- Publication date: 1852
- Publication place: United States
- Media type: Print (Hardcover & Paperback) & E-book
- Pages: c. 300 pp (May change depending on the publisher and the size of the text)

Frank Freeman's Barber Shop is an 1852 plantation fiction novel written by Baynard Rush Hall.

== Overview ==
Frank Freeman's Barber Shop is an example of the numerous anti-Tom novels produced in the southern United States in response to the publication of Uncle Tom's Cabin by Harriet Beecher Stowe, which was criticized as inaccurately depicting plantation life as well as the relationship between slaveholders and their slaves.

Hall's novel is among the earliest examples of the genre and focuses on criticisms of abolitionism and how it can be exploited – a concept later visited in The Planter's Northern Bride by Caroline Lee Hentz (1854).

== Plot ==
The story focuses on a slave named Frank (later Frank Freeman), who is convinced to run away from his peaceful life on a Southern plantation by "philanthropists" (Hall's term for abolitionists), having been promised that freedom would also bring a prestigious career. When Frank comes to the end of his journey, however, he realizes that he has been deceived: his prestigious career is nothing more than running a seedy barber shop frequented by his new abolitionist masters and is paid meagre wages for his work. However, Frank is soon discovered by members of the American Colonization Society, who rescue Frank from his predicament and pay for his passage back to Liberia, his homeland, where he can finally live in peace.

== In other works ==
- Chapter VII of Freeman – entitled The Death of Dinah – is strongly echoed in a later anti-Tom novel: Uncle Robin, in His Cabin in Virginia, and Tom Without One in Boston by J.W. Page (1853), in which another character also named Dinah passes away as a redeemed Christian, as does the character of Dinah in Hall's novel. The death of a Christianized slave was a frequent cliche used in anti-Tom novels, and another example of this is the death of Aunt Phillis in Eastman's Aunt Phillis's Cabin.
- The 1853 novel Liberia; or, Mr. Peyton's Experiments bears some similarities to Freeman, particularly as both feature ex-slaves who are sent to Liberia after leading miserable lives in the north.
