= Robert Criswell =

Robert Criswell may refer to:

- Robert W. Criswell (1850–1905), American humorist and newspaperman
- Robert Criswell, author of "Uncle Tom's Cabin" Contrasted with Buckingham Hall, the Planter's Home (1852)
