= Little Eva: The Flower of the South =

19th century children's novel by Philip J. Cozans

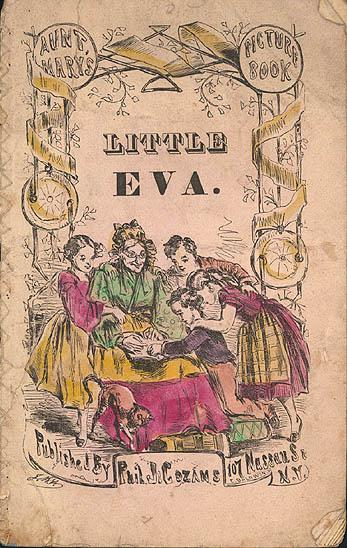
- Front cover of the first edition, stereotyped by Vincent Dill
- Author: Philip J. Cozans (Note: Academics have credited Philip J. Cozans as the author of Little Eva: The Flower of the South; on the other hand, the Roy Rosenzweig Center for History and New Media listed it as an anonymous work.)
- Illustrator: Vincent Dill (stereotyper)
- Language: English
- Genre: Anti-Tom literature
- Published: Philip J. Cozans
- Publication place: United States
- Media type: Print (hardcover)
- Pages: 8 (first edition)
- OCLC: 990067664

Little Eva: The Flower of the South is an Anti-Tom children's book by American writer Philip J. Cozans. Although its publication date is unknown, scholars estimated the release was either in the 1850s or early 1860s. The book follows Little Eva, the daughter of a wealthy Alabama planter. She is characterized through her kindness toward slaves as she reads the Bible to them and teaches the alphabet to slave children. On her ninth birthday, Little Eva nearly drowns, but is rescued by a slave named Sam. Her parents free Sam who decides to remain with the family because he loves them.

Like other Anti-Tom literature, the book was published as a response to Harriet Beecher Stowe's criticism of slavery in the United States in her 1852 novel Uncle Tom's Cabin. Scholars have identified its protagonist as a loose adaptation of the Uncle Tom's Cabin character Little Eva. Little Eva: The Flower of the South was one of the few Anti-Tom books intended for children.

A major theme of the book is education during the slave period in the United States, which is explored through Little Eva's portrayal as an educator. This version of the character was introduced in an Uncle Tom's Cabin illustration, and popularized by artists and children's literature writers, such as Cozans. The book has also been the subject of academic analysis for its proslavery message, although scholar Deborah C. De Rosa described it as an "embattled text" with an "abolitionist impetus".

== Plot ==
Little Eva, the daughter of a wealthy Alabama planter, is known as the "Flower of the South" due to her kindness. She teaches slave children the alphabet, and both Little Eva and the children enjoy the lessons. Little Eva comforts her old nursemaid by giving her chicken broth and keeping her informed of the news. The nursemaid enjoys her company and shares memories of Little Eva's infancy.

Every Sabbath morning, Little Eva reads the Bible to the slaves; even though she has taught several slaves to read, they prefer to listen to her. Little Eva frequently wakes up early to take walks and pick flowers for her mother. On her ninth birthday, she tries to pick grass by a body of water but falls into it and nearly drowns. A slave named Sam rescues her. Little Eva gives Sam a Bible, and her parents free him. He chooses to remain with the family because he loves them.

== Background and publication history ==
=== Historical background ===
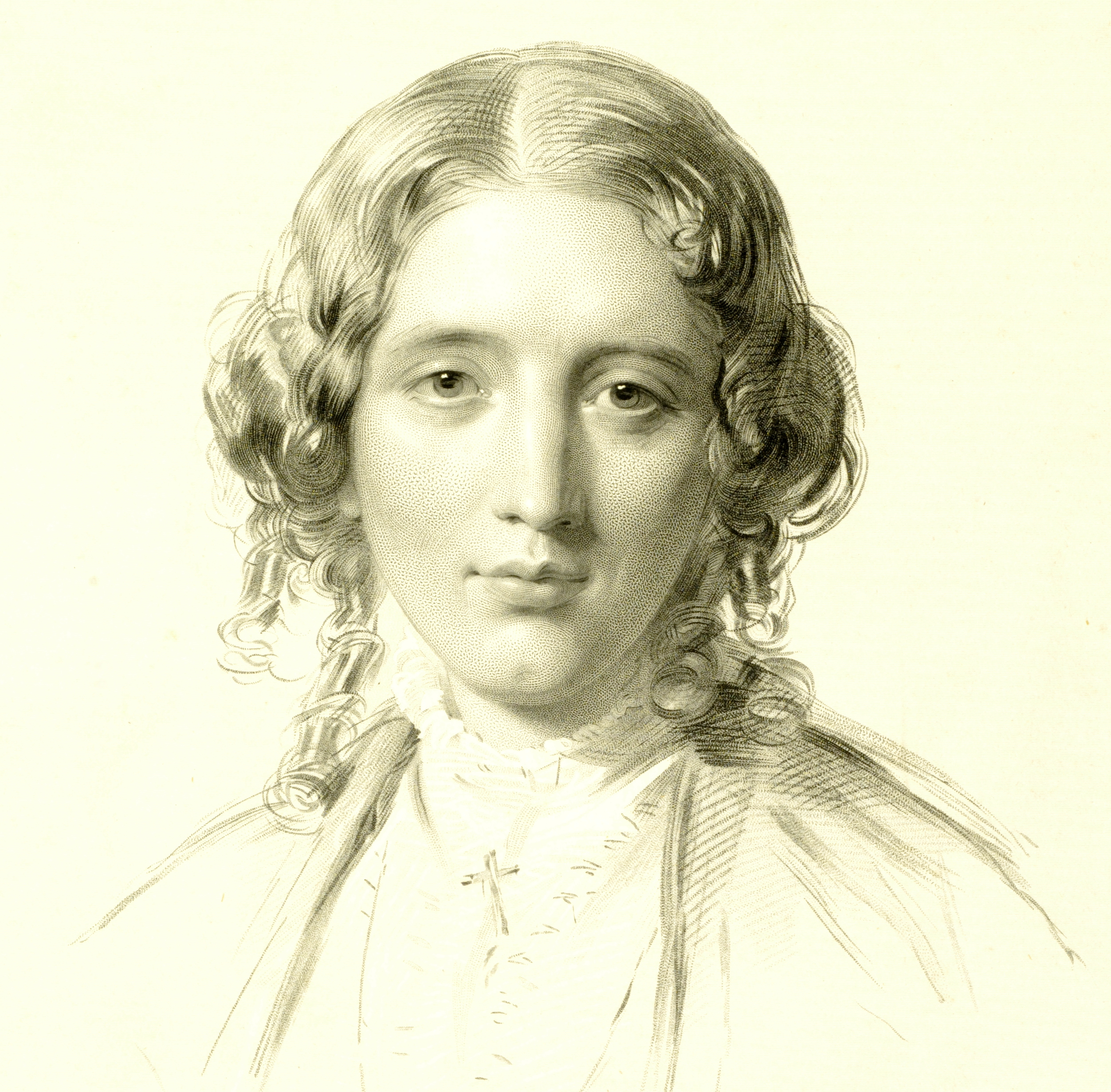
Anti-Tom novels, like Little Eva: The Flower of the South, were written in response to Harriet Beecher Stowe (depicted in 1855).

Little Eva: The Flower of the South is an example of Anti-Tom literature, a literary movement created in response to Harriet Beecher Stowe's criticism of slavery in the United States in her 1852 novel Uncle Tom's Cabin. The Anti-Tom novel was preceded by the plantation novel, and while similar, they are separate types of literature. Slavery received a more "incidental treatment" in plantation literature, but was more prominently featured in Anti-Tom literature. Lisa Hinrichsen and Michael Pitts, writing for the Oxford Research Encyclopedia of Literature, considered Little Eva: The Flower of the South one of the "key publications that serve to romanticize the South while condemning the abolitionist ideals of Stowe’s novel".

Little Eva: The Flower of the South is one of the few instances of Anti-Tom children's literature. (Note: Another example of proslavery children's literature is Francis Robert Goulding's 1852 book Robert And Harold.) Prior to the book's release, its writer and publisher Philip J. Cozans already had an established reputation in children's literature, and was likely motivated by John P. Jewett's success publishing Uncle Tom's Cabin to release Little Eva: The Flower of the South and Little Eva, the First Book. (Note: Little Eva, the First Book, also known as Little Eva's First Book for Good Children, is an alphabet book published in 1853 and 1855. It includes lesson on the alphabet, reading comprehension, and math alongside religious and political fiction and poetry. An abridged version of Uncle Tom's Cabin, which left out Little Eva's death was published with the book.)

In both of his Little Eva books, Cozans reimagined Little Eva, a minor Uncle Tom's Cabin character, as the protagonist. (Note: Topsy, a young slave girl from Uncle Tom's Cabin, received a similar treatment and was reinterpreted as a lead character in separate books including Partridge and Oakey's Poor Little Topsy in 1852 and McLoughlin Brothers' Topsy in 1890.) This character was invoked in both pro-slavery and anti-slavery works. Historian Robert D. Morritt remarked that the Little Eva from Stowe and Cozans were the same character "to a certain degree". Other children's books had also elevated the character to the lead role, including All about Little Eva, printed in 1853 by British publisher Partridge and Oakey. In his version, Cozans introduced the "Flower of the South" nickname for Little Eva, and made several revisions to her character. Unlike Uncle Tom's Cabin, Little Eva: The Flower of the South is set in Alabama rather than New Orleans, and Little Eva is rescued by Sam instead of Uncle Tom. Cozans aged up Little Eva from six-years-old to nine-years-old. Stowe and Cozans both characterized Little Eva through her kindness, but Cozans depicted her as not taking any issues with slavery.

=== Publication history ===
The exact publication date for Little Eva: The Flower of the South is unknown. Some scholars have placed it in either 1852 or 1853, while other estimate a larger range between 1855 and 1861 or more generally in the 1850s. Vincent Dill was the book's stereotyper, and its wood engravings were credited to J. Smith and Baldwin N.Y. The illustrations are "hand-coloured", and the back cover included advertisements for Cozans' other books. The wrapper design was signed J.H.H., possibly the initials of artist Justin H. Howard.

Cozans promoted Little Eva: The Flower of the South as an "Aunt Mary" book, a tactic he used for other books. This was a reference to Mary Low, who adopted Aunt Mary as a pen name to edit a children's version of Uncle Tom's Cabin entitled A Peep into Uncle Tom's Cabin. Despite the packaging, Cozans' book had no connection with Low. Due to a low demand, only three Uncle Tom's Cabin children's adaptations – Little Eva: The Flower of the South, Pictures and Stories from Uncle Tom's Cabin, and A Peep into Uncle Tom's Cabin – were published in the 1850s. (Note: Additional versions of Uncle Tom's Cabin for children and other cultural contexts were created when its copyright lapsed in 1892.)

== Themes ==
=== Education ===
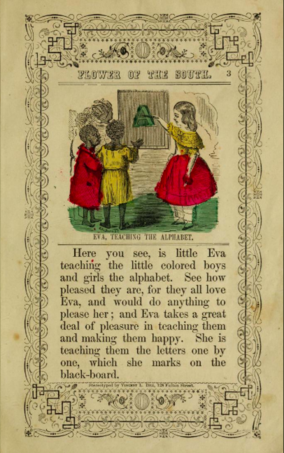
Little Eva's role as a teacher (pictured) was discussed by scholars.

A prominent theme in the book is education during the slave period in the United States. The portrayal of Little Eva as an educator was first popularized by an illustration in the first edition of Uncle Tom's Cabin. In the image, Little Eva engages in a "a pedagogical exchange with Tom", which displaced the novel's description that he was her "confidant rather than pupil". This idea was further expanded on by children's literature writers, like Cozans, and illustrators. Stowe connected Little Eva with education in a more limited way, by writing how she advised slaves to convert to Christianity and attend Bible readings whenever possible. Unlike Cozans' book, in Uncle Tom's Cabin, Little Eva does not organize classes for slaves. (Note: Although Little Eva does not teach classes in Uncle Tom's Cabin, she did read to Uncle Tom and give reading lessons to his wife Aunt Chloe, who is also known as Mammy.)

The book presents education through personalism, with a focus on how a "charismatic teacher mediates between the slave and the printed word" and an argument in favor of a "necessity and moral authority of white intervention". Scholars noted that Little Eva is presented as the ideal Southern belle who uses teaching to fulfill the Noblesse oblige concept. The Roy Rosenzweig Center for History and New Media posed questions on the book's representation of "southern white girlhood", asking if southern adolescent girls really challenged slavery, the patriarchy, and the "late 19th and 20th century social order".

=== Stance on slavery ===
Scholars have classified Little Eva: The Flower of the South as a proslavery work. Throughout the book, the slaves are shown as "gratefully content", and graphic content from Uncle Tom's Cabin, like the abuse of a young slave girl named Topsy, is absent. American literature professor Deborah C. De Rosa approached the book as an "embattled text" instead. According to De Rosa, Little Eva can be understood as a "young abolitionist heroine" based on her decision to teach slaves. De Rosa said this in turn imbues the book with an "abolitionist impetus".

De Rosa's reading was contested by children's literature professor Paula T. Connolly, who cited Sam's refusal to live as a freedman, as well as the descriptions of the slaves' happiness on the plantation, as contradictory evidence. Academic Marcus Wood wrote that, although Little Eva illegally teaches slaves, the book is still a "positive advertisement for the benign authoritarianism and Christianity of the slave system". Wood added that this proslavery message is clearly demonstrated through the descriptions of how the slaves idolize Little Eva.
