= "Uncle Tom's Cabin" Contrasted with Buckingham Hall, the Planter's Home =

1852 novel by Robert Criswell

"Uncle Tom's Cabin" Contrasted with Buckingham Hall, the Planter's Home; or, A Fair View of Both Sides of the Slavery Question
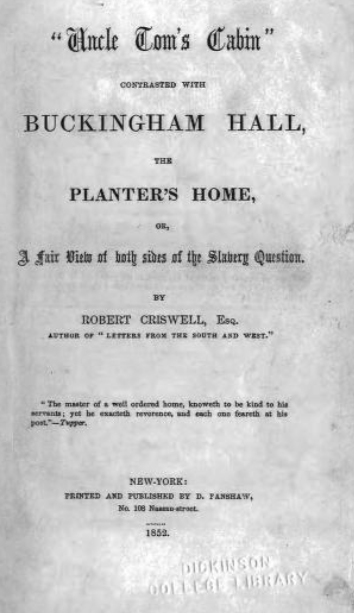
- Author: Robert Criswell
- Language: English
- Genre: Plantation literature Romance
- Publisher: D. Fanshaw of New York
- Publication date: 1852
- Publication place: United States
- Media type: Print (Hardcover only)
- Pages: c. 200 pp (May change depending on the publisher and the size of the text)

"Uncle Tom's Cabin" Contrasted with Buckingham Hall, the Planter's Home is an 1852 novel by Robert Criswell, combining elements of Anti-Tom literature and romantic fiction.

== Overview ==
The novel is one of several written in response to Uncle Tom's Cabin by Harriet Beecher Stowe, which had been criticised by writers from both North and South for its allegedly exaggerated and/or inaccurate depiction of slavery.

However, despite being written initially as a response to Stowe, Criswell's novel is a romance novel depicting love between a northern woman and a southern plantation owner. Slavery is largely ignored for most of the novel, save only for a brief discussion of Uncle Tom's Cabin in Chapter 12.

== Plot ==
The novel follows Eugene Buckingham, the only son of a South Carolina planter, as he crosses paths with Julia Tennyson, a Scottish American journalist who has written a number of pamphlets under various pseudonyms. What begins as mutual friendship eventually evolves into love, despite the anxieties of the opposing fathers. Col. Buckingham – Eugene's father and a (fictional) descendant of the Duke of Buckingham – contests the partnership on the grounds that Julia has written pamphlets degrading all planters as vicious sadists, even though he is not. Likewise Dr. Tennyson – Julia's father and a Scotsman – objects because he supports the view of all planters as violent and cruel.

The Tennysons eventually make their way to South Carolina from New York, and after several philosophical discussions regarding American slavery, Eugene and Julia are allowed to marry. The story ends as the newlyweds embark on a ship to England for their honeymoon.

== Publication ==
The novel was first published in 1852 in hardback form by D. Fanshaw of New York City.

== See also ==
- Anti-Tom literature
- Uncle Tom's Cabin
