= Anti-Tom literature =

American 19th-century pro-slavery novels

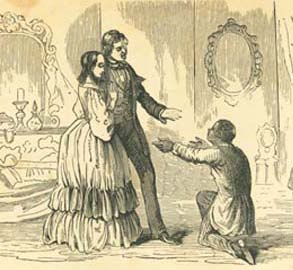
Image from The Planter's Northern Bride (1854) by Caroline Lee Hentz, one of the most famous examples of Anti-Tom literature

Anti-Tom literature consists of the 19th century pro-slavery novels and other literary works written in response to Harriet Beecher Stowe's Uncle Tom's Cabin. Also called plantation literature, these writings were generally written by authors from the Southern United States. Books in the genre attempted to show that slavery was beneficial to African Americans and that the evils of slavery, as depicted in Stowe's book, were overblown and incorrect.

== Uncle Tom's Cabin ==
First published in serialized form from 1851–52 (in the abolitionist journal The National Era), and in book form in 1852, Uncle Tom's Cabin by Harriet Beecher Stowe quickly became the best-selling novel of the 19th century (and the second best-selling book of the century after the Bible). This abolitionist novel focused on the evils of slavery and was inspired by the passage of the Fugitive Slave Act two years before, which punished those who aided runaway slaves. The book was highly controversial and fanned the debate over slavery in the country.

== The Southern literary response ==
The response to Stowe's novel in the American South was one of outrage. To counter Stowe's novel, Southern writers produced many pro-slavery books, the vast majority of them novels. In 1852 alone, eight anti-Tom novels were published.

These anti-Tom novels tended to feature a benign white patriarchal master and a pure wife, both of whom presided over childlike slaves in a benevolent extended-family-style plantation. The novels either implied or directly stated the view that African Americans were unable to live their lives without being directly overseen by white people.

Today, these novels and books are generally seen as pro-slavery propaganda. The anti-Tom genre died off with the start of the American Civil War.

== Simms, Hentz, and other pro-slavery authors ==
The two most famous anti-Tom books are The Sword and the Distaff by William Gilmore Simms and The Planter's Northern Bride by Caroline Lee Hentz.

Simms' The Sword and the Distaff came out only a few months after Stowe's novel and contains several sections and discussions that debate Stowe's book and view of slavery. The novel focuses on the Revolutionary War and its aftermath through the lives of Captain Porgy and one of his slaves. Simms' novel was reprinted in 1854 under the title Woodcraft.

The Planter's Northern Bride by Caroline Lee Hentz was published two years after Uncle Tom's Cabin. Hentz's novel offers a defense of slavery as seen through the eyes of a northern woman—the daughter of an abolitionist—who marries a southern slave owner. Like other books in the genre, Hentz's novel tries to show that black people could not function well without oversight by whites. Her novel also focused on the fear of a slave rebellion, especially if abolitionists did not stop stirring up trouble.

Simms and Hentz's books were two of between 20 and 30 pro-slavery novels written in the decade after Uncle Tom's Cabin. Mary Henderson Eastman's Aunt Phillis's Cabin was one of the bestselling novels of the genre. Published in 1852, it sold 20,000 to 30,000 copies. In a note in the book, Eastman proudly stated she was a descendant of the First Families of Virginia. Maria Jane McIntosh's The Lofty and the Lowly was another popular anti-Tom novel. Published in 1853, the book went through eight editions, receiving many positive reviews. In addition, John Pendleton Kennedy issued a second edition of his 1832 novel, Swallow Barn, adding a chapter in which the main character advocates a more benevolent approach to slavery.

Little Eva: The Flower of the South, by Philip J. Cozans, was a rare example of anti-Tom literature intended to be a children's novel.

== Selected anti-Tom novels ==
Among the novels in the anti-Tom genre are:

- Aunt Phillis's Cabin: or, Southern Life As It Is by Mary H. Eastman (1852)
- The Cabin and Parlor; or, Slaves and Masters by Charles Jacobs Peterson (1852, under the pseudonym of J. Thornton Randolph)
- Frank Freeman's Barber Shop: A Tale by the Rev. Baynard R. Hall (1852)
- Life at the South; or, "Uncle Tom's Cabin" As It Is: Being Narratives, Scenes, and Incidents in the Real "Life of the Lowly" by W. L. G. Smith (1852)
- Life in the South: A Companion to Uncle Tom's Cabin by C. H. Wiley (1852)
- The North and the South; or, Slavery and Its Contrasts: A Tale of Real Life by Caroline Rush (1852)
- "Uncle Tom's Cabin" Contrasted with Buckingham Hall, the Planter's Home by Robert Criswell (1852)
- Antifanaticism: A Tale of the South by Martha Haines Butt (1853)
- Liberia; or, Mr. Peyton's Experiments by Sarah Josepha Hale (1853)
- Little Eva: The Flower of the South by Philip J. Cozans (1853)
- The Lofty and the Lowly, or Good in All and None All Good by M. J. McIntosh (1853)
- Mr. Frank, the Underground Mail-Agent by Vidi (1853)
- Uncle Robin, in His Cabin in Virginia, and Tom Without One in Boston by J. W. Page (1853)
- English Serfdom and American Slavery; or, Ourselves as Others See Us by Lucien B. Chase (1854)
- The Planter's Northern Bride by Caroline Lee Hentz (1854)
- The Sword and the Distaff; or, "Fair, Fat and Forty": A Story of the South at the Close of the Revolution by William Gilmore Simms (1854)
- Tit for Tat by "A Lady of New Orleans" (1856)
- White Acre vs. Black Acre: A Case at Law by William M. Burwell (1856)
- The Black Gauntlet: A Tale of Plantation Life in South Carolina by Mary Howard Schoolcraft (1860)
- The Ebony Idol by Mrs. G.M. Flanders (1860)
- Ellen; or, The Fanatic's Daughter by Mrs. V.G. Cowdin (1860)
- The Leopard's Spots, by Thomas Dixon Jr. (1901)
- The Clansman, by Thomas Dixon Jr. (1905)

== See also ==
- African American literature
- Slave narratives
- Southern literature
