= Aunt Phillis's Cabin =

1852 anti-Tom novel by Mary Henderson Eastman

Aunt Phillis's Cabin; or, Southern Life as It Is
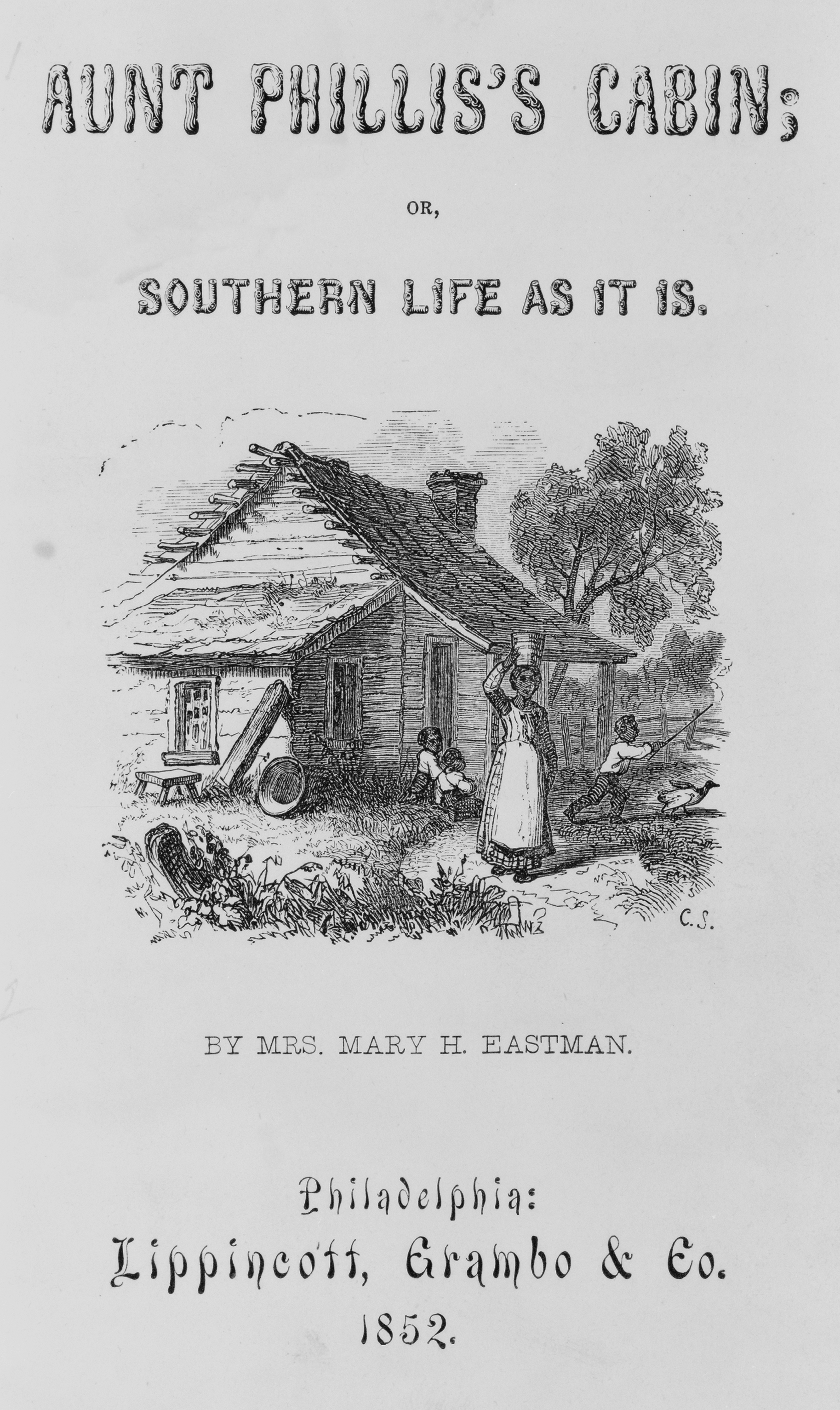
- Title page of the 1852 edition
- Author: Mary Henderson Eastman
- Language: English
- Genre: Plantation literature anti-Tom novel
- Publisher: Lippincott, Grambo & Co.
- Publication date: 1852
- Publication place: United States
- Media type: Print

Aunt Phillis's Cabin; or, Southern Life as It Is by Mary Henderson Eastman is a plantation fiction novel, and is perhaps the most read anti-Tom novel in American literature. It was published by Lippincott, Grambo & Co. of Philadelphia in 1852 as a response to Harriet Beecher Stowe's Uncle Tom's Cabin, published earlier that year. The novel sold 20,000–30,000 copies, far fewer than Stowe's novel, but still a strong commercial success and bestseller. Based on her growing up in Warrenton, Virginia, of an elite planter family, Eastman portrays plantation owners and slaves as mutually respectful, kind, and happy beings.

== Overview ==
Published in 1852, Aunt Phillis's Cabin contains contrasts and comparisons to the anti-slavery novel, Uncle Tom's Cabin by Harriet Beecher Stowe, which was published earlier that year. It serves as an antithesis; Eastman's novel deliberately referred to the situation in Stowe's Uncle Tom's Cabin, where plantation owners abuse their repressed, disloyal slaves. In contrast, Eastman portrays white plantation owners who behave benignly towards their slaves.

Eastman uses quotations from various sources–including Uncle Tom's Cabin–to explain that slavery is a natural institution, and essential to life. Like other novels of the genre, it contains much dialogue between masters and slaves, in which she portrays "the essential happiness of slaves in the South as compared to the inevitable sufferings of free blacks and the working classes in the North," as noted by the scholar Stephen Railton in the website Uncle Tom's Cabin & American Culture.

== Plot ==
The story is set in unnamed rural town in Virginia, which is frequented by several plantation owners living around it. The town relies on trade from the cotton plantations for its economy. Understanding this, the plantation owners, in contrast to their neighbors in surrounding towns, have adopted a benign approach toward their slaves to keep them peaceful and assure the safety of the town. Several characters in and around the town are introduced throughout the story, demonstrating how this process works and the delicate balance of such a process in action.

== Characters ==
- Aunt Phillis – A 50-year-old slave living on a Virginia cotton plantation. She is pious, temperant and proud, being likened to a Nubian queen. Phillis does not appear in the novel until Chapter IX.
- Uncle Bacchus – The sociable enslaved husband of Phillis. He is kindly, currently named after the Roman god Bacchus due to his alcoholism. He and Phillis have three children: a son William, and two daughters, Lydia and Esther.
- Mr. Weston – A kindly English American planter and the master of Phillis, Bacchus, and several other slaves, all of whom he treats with respect and kindness. He is a widower, descended from a long line of English feudal lords. He lives on the plantation with his widowed sister-in-law, Anna Weston, and several other members of his family.
- Alice Weston – Niece of Mr. Weston, who is betrothed to his son Arthur, making them a cousin couple. She is one of the main protagonists of the novel, in which she is the object of affections between her fiancé and a rival slaveholder.
- Arthur Weston – The fiancé of Alice, who is studying at Yale College in New England during events in the novel. Because of his Southern roots, Arthur is confronted by several abolitionists throughout his time at Yale. He is a spokesman in the novel for criticisms of abolitionism in general.
- Miss Janet / Cousin Janet – An elderly friend of Mr. Weston, who resides with him on the plantation. She acts as an instructor to the women slaves in the arts of sewing, embroidery, and other domestic tasks. She also acts as an aunt figure to Alice.
- Aunt Peggy – A senile, 90-year-old slave from Guinea, who lives on the plantation without having to work, because of her age. She irritates Bacchus and Phillis, mocking the other slaves from the comfort of her cabin. She dies in Chapter XII, after mocking Alice's sudden chill and claiming that Alice would die.
- Abel Johnson – A friend of Arthur studying at Yale College. Abel acts as the middleman in the argument over slavery, preferring to remain neutral in most cases. He is shown to be something of a philanthropist, and displays some sympathy for slaves without attacking slavery outright.
- Captain William Moore – An army captain living in New England with his wife, Emmy Moore. Captain Moore is a military officer, who has recently been assigned to calm trouble in New England that has been brought about by abusive abolitionists "rescuing" runaway slaves, only to enslave them for their own ends. One such slave, Susan, eventually becomes a maid to the Moores after being rescued from abolitionist masters.
- Other characters in the novel include several planters – Mr. Barbour (the first character to appear in the novel), Mr. Kent (an abolitionist-turned-slaveholder, similar to the situation of The Planter's Northern Bride), Walter Lee (the rival for Alice's affections), Mr. Chapman (a critic of the fugitive slave laws) – and several slaves, including Mark, John, Nancy (of the Weston plantation) and Aunt Polly (an ex-slave and servant of the Moores).

== Reception ==
Although obscure today, the novel remains one of the most-read examples of the anti-Tom genre. Between 20,000 and 30,000 copies of Aunt Phillis's Cabin were sold upon its initial release in 1852. The novel was the most commercially successful of the anti-Tom genre until the publication of The Lofty and the Lowly, or Good in All and None All Good in 1853, which sold 8,000 copies within the first weeks of publication.

== Publication history ==
Aunt Phillis's Cabin was released in 1852 – the same year that Uncle Tom's Cabin appeared in book form – by Lippincott, Grambo & Co. of Philadelphia (better known as J. B. Lippincott & Co.) As a major publishing house, the company released other anti-Tom novels, including Antifanaticism: A Tale of the South by Martha Haines Butt (1853), and Mr. Frank, the Underground Mail-Agent by Vidi (1853).

== In other works ==
- Another 1852 anti-Tom novel, Life at the South; or, "Uncle Tom's Cabin" as It Is by W. L. G. Smith, features a title similar to the full title of Eastman's novel. Both novels likely based their titles on American Slavery as It Is: Testimony of a Thousand Witnesses, an 1839 volume co-authored by abolitionists Theodore Dwight Weld and the Grimké sisters. This was a source for some of the content in Uncle Tom's Cabin.
- In the preface of Aunt Phillis's Cabin, Eastman quoted a variety of sources from the Bible which she claimed supported slavery as an institution. These same quotes, typical of those used by Southern ministers, were used in another anti-Tom novel, The Black Gauntlet: A Tale of Plantation Life in South Carolina by Mary Howard Schoolcraft, which was published four years later in 1860.
- The scene of the death of Aunt Phillis as a Christianized slave became a frequent cliché among the later anti-Tom novels. Other novels that feature slaves' dying as converted Christians include: Frank Freeman's Barber Shop by Baynard Rush Hall (1852), and Uncle Robin, in His Cabin in Virginia, and Tom Without One in Boston by J. W. Page (1853). Whether this cliché is solely derived from Eastman's novel or from the pious death of Uncle Tom in Uncle Tom's Cabin is open to debate.
