= Uncle Robin, in His Cabin in Virginia, and Tom Without One in Boston =

1853 novel by J.W. Page

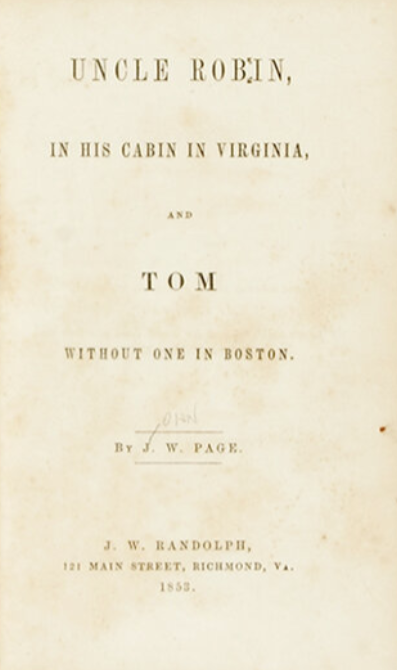
- Title page for Uncle Robin, in His Cabin in Virginia, and Tom Without One in Boston (1853)
- Author: J.W. Page
- Language: English
- Genre: Plantation literature
- Publisher: J.W. Randolph Publishers
- Publication date: 1853
- Publication place: United States
- Media type: Print (Hardcover & Paperback) & E-book
- Pages: c. 300 pp (May change depending on the publisher and the size of the text)

Uncle Robin, in His Cabin in Virginia, and Tom Without One in Boston (sometimes shortened to simply Uncle Robin's Cabin) is an 1853 novel written by J.W. Page and released by J. W. Randolph Publishers of Richmond, Virginia.

== Overview ==
Uncle Robin is one of several examples of the pro-slavery anti-Tom or plantation literature genre that emerged in the Southern United States. They were written in response to the publication of the bestselling abolitionist novel Uncle Tom's Cabin, released in book form in 1852, and were read both in the North and the South. Such novels contributed to the national discussions about slavery and were part of the rising sectional tensions.

Much like other novels of the genre, Uncle Robin serves as an antithesis to Uncle Tom's Cabin. It portrays planters as benign and helpful to their slaves, with the villains portrayed as the abolitionists who stir up trouble.

== Plot ==
The novel features two black slaves from Virginia – Uncle Robin (the loyal slave), and Uncle Tom (the disloyal slave, and a reference to the main character of Uncle Tom's Cabin). Whereas Tom is convinced to run away from his plantation by a group of abolitionists, Robin remains loyal to his master, and remains on the plantation.

As the novel progresses, Uncle Robin is shown to have become a well-fed and prosperous slave by remaining loyal and obedient; he is looked after well by his master. Uncle Tom, abused by the abolitionists he fled with, has since died, together with several other slaves who escaped to the North and found more oppression under the abolitionists than on the plantation.

== In other works ==
The scene of death of a Christianized slave was frequently used in anti-Tom novels, a cliche found in Mary Henderson Eastman's bestselling Aunt Phillis's Cabin; or, Southern Life As It Is (1852). As another example, Chapter VII of Uncle Robin – entitled "Death in a Cabin" – strongly resembles a similar chapter in the 1852 anti-Tom novel: Frank Freeman's Barber Shop by Rev. Baynard Rush Hall. He features the death of a slave named Dinah, who is a redeemed Christian, as do Eastman and Page.

== Publication history ==
J.W. Randolph Publishers issued additional anti-Tom novels before the Civil War, among them the satirical White Acre vs. Black Acre (1856) by William M. Burwell.
