= Caroline Lee Hentz =

American proslavery author and educator (1800–1856)

Caroline Lee Whiting
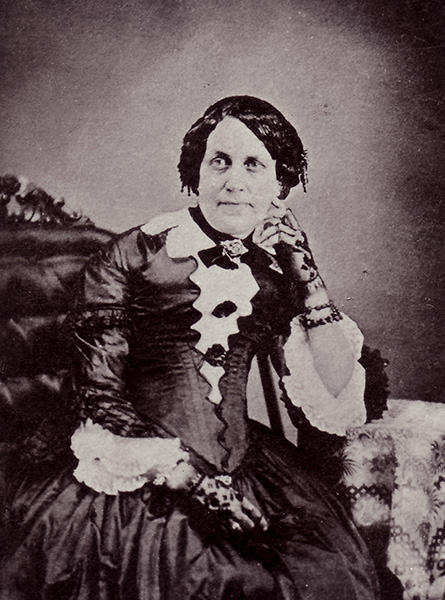
- Born: June 1, 1800; Lancaster, Massachusetts, U.S.
- Died: February 11, 1856 (aged 55); Marianna, Florida, U.S.
- Occupations: Educator; novelist; writer (sentimental fiction)
- Notable work: The Planter's Northern Bride
- Spouse: Nicholas Marcellus Hentz (married September 30, 1824)
- Children: Marcellus Fabius (1825–1827); Charles Arnould Hentz (1827–1894); Julia Louisa (1829–1877); Thaddeus William Harris(1830–1878); Caroline Therese (1833–1904)

Caroline Lee Whiting Hentz (June 1, 1800 – February 11, 1856) was an American novelist. She is most noted for her defenses of slavery and opposition to the abolitionist movement. Her widely read The Planter's Northern Bride (1854) was one of the genre known as anti-Tom novels, by which writers responded to Harriet Beecher Stowe's bestselling anti-slavery novel, Uncle Tom's Cabin (1852).

== Early life ==
Caroline Hentz was born as Caroline Lee Whiting on June 1, 1800, to Colonel John and Orpah Whiting in Lancaster, Massachusetts. The youngest of eight children, her father served as a Continental Army soldier in the American Revolutionary War and three of her brothers fought in the War of 1812.

As a child, Whiting attended a private school run by Jared Sparks. By the time she was twelve, she had already composed a fantasy about the Far East, as well as a play. At seventeen she was teaching at a local Lancaster school.

On September 30, 1824, Caroline married Nicholas Marcellus Hentz. Shortly after, the couple moved to Chapel Hill, North Carolina with their first child, where her husband became chair of modern languages at the University of North Carolina. She is described as being "a northerner who traveled and worked throughout the South for nearly thirty years." She lived in seven different states in her lifetime, had five children, and supported her family financially with her writing.

== Personal life ==
As the youngest of eight children, Hentz watched as “three of her brothers became officers and served in the War of 1812.” Their letters home and “tales of patriotic adventure” were great inspiration to her. As a young girl, she was “popular with her companions, playing games, taking woodland walks, and studying nature.”

On September 30, 1824, she married Nicholas Marcellus Hentz, “a political refugee from Metz [and] son of a member of the French National Convention.” The couple originally lived near Round Hill School in Northampton, Massachusetts, where Nicholas was an instructor. In 1826, the couple moved to the University of North Carolina at Chapel Hill where Nicholas became the chair of modern languages.

During this period, Hentz helped George Moses Horton, an enslaved illiterate poet, by writing down his poems and sending them to local newspapers to gain publication. This was the start of Horton's career as a poet; he was later called the "Black bard of North Carolina".

The Hentzes left shortly after for Covington, Kentucky, where Nicholas founded a girls' school in 1830. From their new home in Covington, Caroline Hentz wrote the prize-winning tragedy De Lara; or, The Moorish Bride for actor William Pelby of Boston. Although Pelby had offered her a $500 prize, he was unable to pay and gave Hentz back the copyright to the play.

In 1832, Caroline and Nicholas Kentz opened a girls' school in Cincinnati, Ohio. There, Caroline joined the Semi-Colon Club, which is likely where her acquaintance with Harriet Beecher Stowe began. During their time in Cincinnati, Nicholas displayed an irrational jealousy that may have served as inspiration for Hentz's Byronic heroes. “According to their son, Dr. Charles Arnould Hentz, Colonel King of the Semi-Colon Club, sent an improper note to the dignified and accomplished Mrs. Hentz.” When she attempted to respond to the note, her suspicious husband discovered the correspondence. After threatening to duel Colonel King, Nicholas swiftly closed down the school. He forced the family to move to Florence, Alabama, where they opened another school.

Hentz had a total of five children. Her oldest son died when he was only two years old. While in Florence, Hentz spent most of her time caring for the family. She wrote less formally during this period, but she did write some poetry and kept a diary that inspired the “letters, deathbed confession, and other lamentations that are hallmarks of her novels.” While living in Florence for nine years, the family leased two slaves, one of them a woman who helped Hentz with her domestic chores.

Next the family moved to Tuscaloosa, where Hentz and her husband opened another school in 1843. In 1845, the family opened yet another school in Tuskegee, which was a small village at the time.

In 1848, the couple opened a school in Columbus, Georgia. One year later, in 1849, Nicholas became an invalid, and Hentz had to take on the total burden of supporting the family, although she was not well herself. Two of the adult Hentz children settled in Marianna, Florida, and their parents moved there in 1852 to join them. During her husband's illness, Hentz wrote at his bedside, dividing her attention among his care, the demands of the literary public, and the occasional visitors who would disturb her routine. In 1853, she returned to New England for a brief visit before making her way back to Florida.

After nearly five years of supporting her family financially and nursing her husband, Caroline Lee Whiting Hentz died of pneumonia on February 11, 1856. Nicholas Hentz died a few months later. The couple is buried under one stone in the Episcopal Cemetery in Marianna.

== Career ==
Working as a teacher from the beginning of her career, Hentz also wrote and produced several small pieces and distributed them to local publications. In 1831, Hentz wrote De Lara; or, The Moorish Bride for Boston actor William Pelby. The tragedy won Hentz recognition in 1842 when it was performed at the Arch Street Theatre in Philadelphia and the Tremont Theatre in Boston, and it was published in 1843.

Hentz's career advanced greatly between the years 1832 and 1856. In March 1832, she published her first work, a short story, "The Sacrifice," in Godey's Lady's Book, a popular magazine for women. While living in Covington, Kentucky, Hentz wrote Constance of Werdenberg, a play performed at the Park Theatre in New York in 1832. It was never published.

That same year, another Hentz's plays, Lamorah; or, the Western Wild, played in Cincinnati before moving to New Orleans, where it was produced at Calwell's on January 1, 1833. In 1850, Hentz published her most profitable novel, Linda.

Hentz's earlier works were written for young readers, mimicking religious parables and instructing them in morality. Hentz was also known for "engaging in some of the most prominent public debates on the ethics and social relations of the slave system."

After retiring from her career as an educator, Hentz began to write vigorously and her literary career blossomed as a result. From 1850 to 1856, "Hentz produced several collections of stories as well as seven more novels."

One of Hentz's most famous novels, The Planter’s Northern Bride, was published in 1854. It has been described as a "polemical and distinctively Southern response to Harriet Beecher Stowe's Uncle Tom's Cabin," which was published in 1852 and became a best seller. The Northern Bride was one of a genre known as anti-Tom literature. Hentz's last novel, Ernest Linwood, was published on February 11, 1856.

=== Achievements ===
"Her five-act tragedy, De Lara; or, The Moorish Bride, Philadelphia, also won a competition sponsored by the Arch Street Theatre in Philadelphia." This "prize [was] offered by Boston actor and manager William Pelby", but he was unable to pay it. The Boston Library named her as one of the top 3 writers of the day." The Mob Cap appeared in the Saturday Courier winning critical praise and a $200 prize."

== Writing ==
While at Covington, Kentucky, Hentz competed for a prize of $500 that had been offered for a play by the directors of the Arch Street Theatre in Philadelphia. The prize was awarded to her for her tragedy of De Lara, or the Moorish Bride. It was produced on stage and published in book-form in 1843. Lamorah, or the Western Wild, another tragedy, was performed at Cincinnati after having been published in a newspaper at Columbus, Georgia in 1832. Constance of Werdenberg, a third tragedy, remained unpublished.

Hentz also wrote numerous short poems. She wrote a voluminous number of tales and novelettes that were published in periodicals and newspapers, many of which were collected into volumes.

Hentz introduces several villains in her novel, The Planter's Northern Bride (1854). One is a busybody who tries to free slaves against their will. By doing so, Hentz tries to discredit the abolitionist argument of inhumane treatment of the Southern slaves. She portrays the people wanting to abolish the institution of slavery as being motivated for personal gain, not by a desire to improve mankind. She expanded on this motive to attribute abolitionist sentiment to the industrial revolution that was taking place in the North, which she said would require the massive amounts of cheap labor that only the South could provide by way of slavery.

=== Primary works ===
- Lamorah; or, the Western Wild (play, 1832)
- Constance of Werdenberg; or, The Forest League (play, 1832)
- Lovell's Folly (1833)
- De Lara; or, The Moorish Bride (play, 1843)
- "Human and Divine Philosophy: A Poem Written for the Erosophic Society of the University of Alabama" (1844)
- Aunt Patty's Scrap-bag (1846)
- Linda; or, The Young Pilot of the Belle Creole (1850)
- Rena; or, The Snow Bird (1851)
- Eoline; or, Magnolia Vale; or, The Heiress of Glenmore (1852)
- Marcus Warland; or, The Long Moss Spring (1852)
- The Banished Son and Other Stories of the Heart (short story collection,1852)
- Helen and Arthur; or, Miss Thusa's Spinning Wheel (1853)
- The Victim of Excitement, The Bosom Serpent, etc. (short story collection,1853) (reprinted as Love After Marriage and Other Stories of the Heart in 1857)
- Wild Jack; or, The Stolen Child, and Other Stories (1853)
- "The Hermit of Rockrest" (1853)
- The Planter's Northern Bride (1854)
- Courtship and Marriage; or, The Joys and Sorrows of American Life (1856)
- Ernest Linwood; or, The Inner Life of the Author (1856)
- The Lost Daughter and Other Stories of the Heart (short story collection,1857)
- Robert Graham (1855) Sequel to Linda; or, The Young Pilot of the Belle Creole
