= Mary Henderson Eastman =

19th-century American writer and historian (1818–1887)

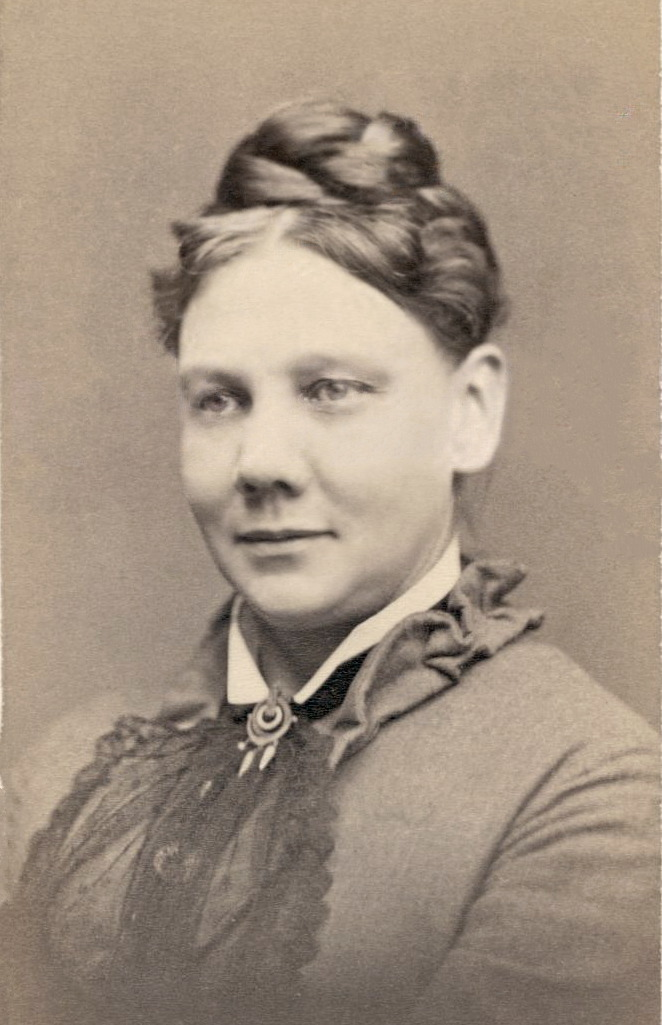
- Born: Mary Henderson; February 24, 1818; Warrenton, Virginia, U.S.
- Died: February 24, 1887 (aged 69); Washington, D.C., U.S.
- Resting place: Oak Hill Cemetery; Washington, D.C., U.S.
- Spouse: Seth Eastman (m. 1835)
- Children: 4
- Relatives: Thomas Truxtun (grandfather)
- Writing career
- Language: English
- Notable works: Aunt Phillis's Cabin, Dahcotah

Mary Henderson Eastman (February 24, 1818 – February 24, 1887) was an American historian and novelist who is noted for her works about Native American life. She was also an advocate of slavery in the United States. In response to Harriet Beecher Stowe's anti-slavery Uncle Tom's Cabin, Eastman defended Southern slaveholding society by writing Aunt Phillis's Cabin; Or, Southern Life As It Is (1852), which earned her considerable fame. She was the wife of the American illustrator and army officer Seth Eastman.

== Biography ==
Mary Henderson was born on February 24, 1818, in Warrenton, Virginia, to Anna Maria (née Truxtun) and Thomas Henderson, a physician. His mother was the daughter of Commodore Thomas Truxtun, a hero during the United States' Quasi-War with France. As she stated in her novel Aunt Phillis's Cabin (1852), Eastman was a descendant of the First Families of Virginia and had grown up in slaveholding society. She grew up in the state but her family relocated to Washington, D.C., when her father was appointed as assistant surgeon general of the United States Army. It is suggested that she received her education in Washington.

In 1835, she met and married Seth Eastman. who previously had a Native American wife named Wakháŋ Inážiŋ Wiŋ (Stands Sacred), the fifteen-year-old daughter of Cloud Man, a Santee Dakota chief of French and Mdewakanton descent and was therefore the grandfather of notable physician, writer, and reformer Charles Alexander Eastman. Eastman was twenty-seven while Mary was seventeen. He was a topographical engineering graduate from West Point and a distinguished painter. He would later become the commander of the Confederate POW camp in New York, which was noted for having the highest mortality rate of any Union stockade.

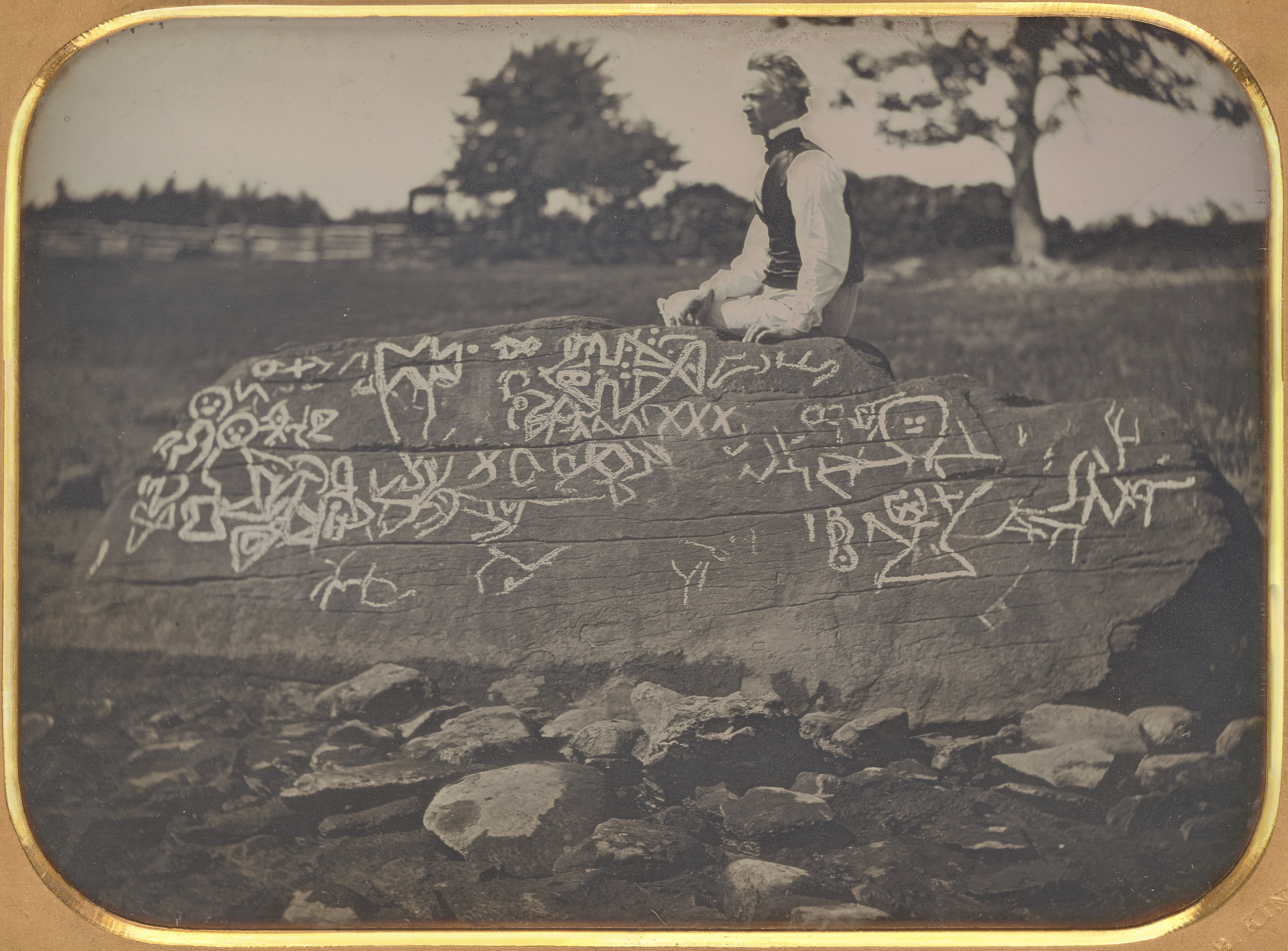
Seth Eastman at Dighton Rock, 1853.

By 1841, Eastman accompanied her husband when he assumed command of Fort Snelling (in what is now Minnesota), where he served until 1848. During this period, Eastman learned the Sioux language to study and record the Sioux customs and lore. In addition to their literary collaboration, she also helped her husband sell his paintings and secure a project with Henry Rowe Schoolcraft.

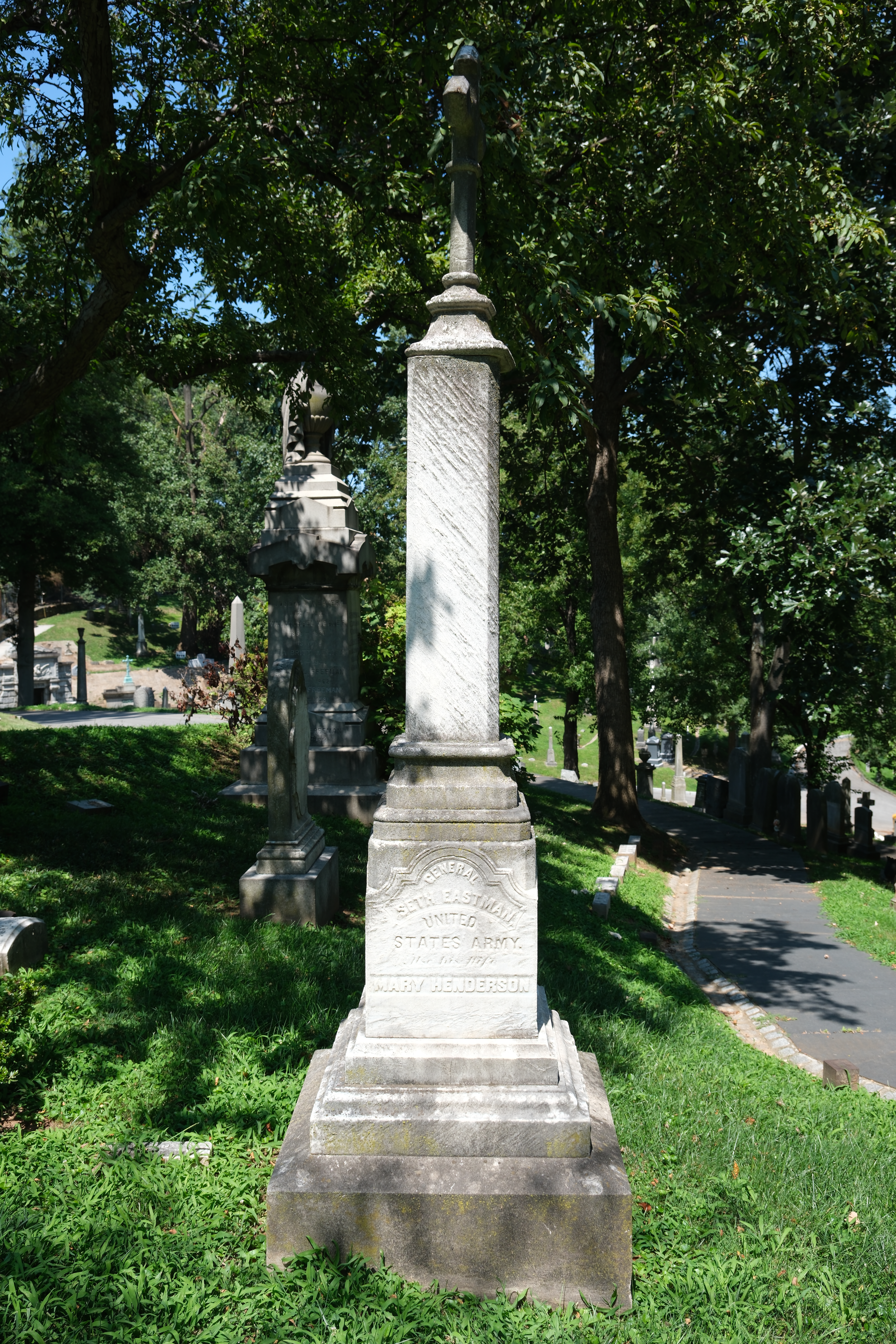
Grave of Eastman at Oak Hill Cemetery

After the Eastmans left Fort Snelling, they lived in Washington, D.C., where she worked to defend Southern slaveholding society before changing her position on slavery and becoming a Unionist. Eastman died on February 24, 1887, in Washington, D.C. She was interred at Oak Hill Cemetery in Washington, D.C.

== Works ==
When Captain Eastman was appointed commander of Fort Snelling, Eastman used her time to record and preserve the local culture. One of her works was Dahcotah; Or, Life and Legends of the Sioux Around Fort Snelling (1849). It detailed Sioux customs and lore in a somewhat fictionalized account and was based on the account of a Sioux medicine woman called Chequered Cloud. The book, which is illustrated by her husband, is claimed to have influenced Henry Wadsworth Longfellow’s The Song of Hiawatha. It also documented the plight of women in the Sioux society, noting their unjust treatment by cruel and vindictive husbands. Eastman's accounts included observation on notable personages such as the Indian orator Shah-co-pee, who was cited for his eloquence when addressing his people.

Among the legends Eastman allegedly collected from the Dakota was a version of the death of Winona, the daughter of Chief Red Wing of the Dakota tribe. However, at that time in history, "Winona", which means "first-born", was not in use as a proper name, and the Dakota did not use European titles of royalty. She sent her book to the United States Congress in 1849.

Eastman also published several books that criticized the white treatment of American Indians. These included Chicora and Other Regions of the Conquerors and the Conquered (1854) in which she expressed her anger at the military conquerors and missionaries for their attitude toward the Indians.

In the years of tension before the American Civil War, many writers published novels that addressed each side of the slavery issue. Shortly before the war, in 1852, Eastman entered the literary "lists" and wrote the bestselling Aunt Phillis's Cabin; Or, Southern Life As It Is. Defending slaveholders, she responded as a Southern planter to Harriet Beecher Stowe's anti-slavery work Uncle Tom's Cabin. Mary Eastman’s novel was one of the most widely read anti-Tom novels and a commercial success, selling 20 000–30 000 copies.

Later, Eastman changed her position on slavery and became a Unionist. It is suggested that the shift in her stance was influenced by her husband's political views and the fact that he and their sons fought for the Union. In 1864, she wrote the book Jennie Wade of Gettysburg in praise of a Union heroine.

=== Publications ===
- Eastman, Mary Henderson (1849). Dahcotah; Or, Life and Legends of the Sioux Around Fort Snelling (Illustrated by Seth Eastman ed.). New York: J. Wiley.
- Eastman, Mary Henderson (1852). Aunt Phillis's Cabin; Or, Southern Life As It Is. Philadelphia: Lippincott, Grambo & Co.
- Hart, John S., ed. (1852). The Iris: An Illuminated Souvenir for 1852. Philadelphia: Lippincott, Grambo & Co. "Mary Eastman wrote many of the entries, mostly about Indian life. Her articles were collected and republished the following year under the title below."
- Eastman, Mary Henderson (1853). Romance of Indian Life: With Other Tales, Selections from the Iris, An Illuminated Souvenir. Philadelphia: Lippincott, Grambo & Co. ISBN 9780665144554.
- Eastman, Mary Henderson (1853). The American Aboriginal Portfolio. Philadelphia: J. B. Lippincott.
- Eastman, Mary Henderson (1854). Chicora and Other Regions of the Conquerors and the Conquered. Reprinted as The American Annual; Illustrative of the Early History of North America (1855). Philadelphia: J. B. Lippincott.
- Eastman, Mary Henderson (1856). Fashionable Life. Philadelphia: J. B. Lippincott and Co.
- Eastman, Mary Henderson (1864). Jennie Wade of Gettysburg. Philadelphia: J. B. Lippincott.
- Eastman, Mary Henderson (1873). Easter Angels. Philadelphia: J. B. Lippincott.
