= The Planter's Northern Bride =

1854 book by Caroline Lee Hentz

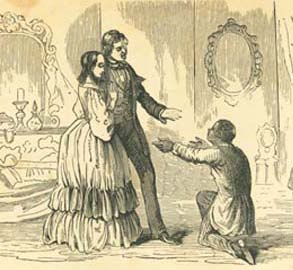
- Image from The Planter's Northern Bride (1854)
- Author: Caroline Lee Hentz
- Language: English
- Genre: Plantation literature
- Publisher: T.B. Peterson Ltd.
- Publication date: 1854
- Publication place: United States
- Media type: Print (Hardcover & Paperback) & E-book
- Pages: c. 300 pp

The Planter's Northern Bride is an 1854 novel written by Caroline Lee Hentz, in response to the publication of Uncle Tom's Cabin by Harriet Beecher Stowe in 1852.

== Overview ==
Unlike other examples of anti-Tom literature (aka "plantation literature"), the title The Planter's Northern Bride is not a pun on Uncle Tom's Cabin, as was the case with Uncle Robin, in His Cabin in Virginia, and Tom Without One in Boston (1853).

The novel, unlike previous examples of plantation literature, criticized abolitionism in the United States and how easily anti-slavery organisations such as the Underground Railroad could be manipulated by pro-slavery superiors – a concept previously discussed in Rev. Baynard Rush Hall's earlier anti-Tom novel, Frank Freeman's Barber Shop (1852).

== Plot ==
The book's main character is Eulalia, a young daughter of an abolitionist from New England and the wife of a plantation owner named Moreland. At first indoctrinated by her father's views on abolitionism, Eulalia initially condemns her husband's use of slaves on his plantation – even though he is behaving benignly towards them – but she soon realizes how well off Moreland's slaves truly are.

As time passes, Eulalia also discovers a plot by a group of local abolitionists to stage a large-scale slave rebellion, with aims to "free" the otherwise-content slaves of the plantation and to murder both Moreland and Eulalia, despite their kindness to their slaves.

== Publication history ==
Hentz's novel was first published in novelised form by T.B. Peterson Ltd. in 1854.

The publishers of Hentz's novel had been responsible for the release of another anti-Tom novel two years previously: The Cabin and Parlor; or, Slaves and Masters by Charles Jacobs Peterson (1852).
