= Uncle Tom's Cabin =

1852 novel by Harriet Beecher Stowe

- Title page for Volume I of the first edition of Uncle Tom's Cabin (1852)
- Author: Harriet Beecher Stowe
- Original title: Uncle Tom's Cabin; or, Life Among the Lowly.
- Illustrator: Hammatt Billings
- Language: English
- Genre: Novel
- Published: March 20, 1852 (two volumes)
- Publisher: John P. Jewett and Company, after serialization in The National Era beginning June 5, 1851
- Publication place: United States
- OCLC: 1077982310
- Dewey Decimal: 813.3
- LC Class: PS2954 .U5
- Followed by: A Key to Uncle Tom's Cabin
- Text: Uncle Tom's Cabin at Wikisource

Uncle Tom's Cabin; or, Life Among the Lowly is an anti-slavery novel by American author Harriet Beecher Stowe. Published in two volumes in 1852, the novel had a profound effect on attitudes toward African Americans and slavery in the U.S., and is said to have "helped lay the groundwork for the American Civil War".

Stowe, a Connecticut-born teacher at the Hartford Female Seminary, was part of the religious Beecher family and an active abolitionist. She wrote the sentimental novel to depict the horrors of slavery while also asserting that Christian love could overcome slavery. The novel focuses on the character of Uncle Tom, a long-suffering black slave around whom the stories of the other characters revolve.

In the United States, Uncle Tom's Cabin was the best-selling novel and the second best-selling book of the 19th century, following the Bible. It is credited with helping fuel the abolitionist cause in the 1850s. The influence attributed to the book was so great that a apocryphal story arose of Abraham Lincoln meeting Stowe at the start of the Civil War and declaring, "So this is the little lady who started this great war."

The book and the plays it inspired helped popularize a number of negative stereotypes about black people, including that of the namesake character "Uncle Tom". The term came to be associated with an excessively subservient person. These later associations with Uncle Tom's Cabin have, to an extent, overshadowed the historical effects of the book as a "vital antislavery tool". Nonetheless, the novel remains a "landmark" in protest literature, with later books such as The Jungle by Upton Sinclair and Silent Spring by Rachel Carson owing a large debt to it.

== Sources ==
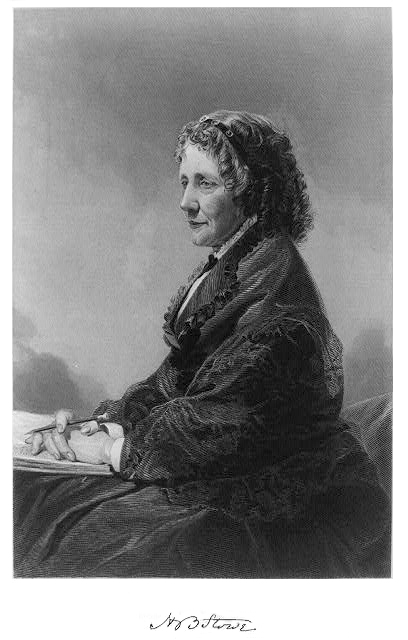
An engraving of Harriet Beecher Stowe from 1872, based on an oil painting by Alonzo Chappel

Stowe, a Connecticut-born teacher at the Hartford Female Seminary and an active abolitionist, wrote the novel as a response to the passage, in 1850, of the second Fugitive Slave Act. Much of the book was composed at her house in Brunswick, Maine, where her husband, Calvin Ellis Stowe, taught at his alma mater, Bowdoin College.

Stowe was partly inspired to create Uncle Tom's Cabin by the slave narrative The Life of Josiah Henson, Formerly a Slave, Now an Inhabitant of Canada, as Narrated by Himself (1849). Henson, a formerly enslaved black man, had lived and worked on a 3,700-acre (15 km^{2}) plantation in North Bethesda, Maryland, owned by Isaac Riley. Henson escaped slavery in 1830 by fleeing to the Province of Upper Canada (now Ontario), where he helped other fugitive slaves settle and become self-sufficient.

Stowe was also inspired by the posthumous biography of Phebe Ann Jacobs, a devout Congregationalist of Brunswick, Maine. Born on a slave plantation in Lake Hiawatha, New Jersey, Jacobs was enslaved for most of her life, including by the president of Bowdoin College. In her final years, Jacobs lived as a free woman, laundering clothes for Bowdoin students. She achieved respect from her community due to her devout religious beliefs, and her funeral was widely attended.

Another source Stowe used as research for Uncle Tom's Cabin was American Slavery as It Is: Testimony of a Thousand Witnesses, a volume co-authored by Theodore Dwight Weld and the Grimké sisters. Stowe also conducted interviews with people who escaped slavery. Stowe mentioned a number of these inspirations and sources in A Key to Uncle Tom's Cabin (1853). This non-fiction book was intended to not only verify Stowe's claims about slavery but also point readers to the many "publicly available documents" detailing the horrors of slavery.

== Publication ==
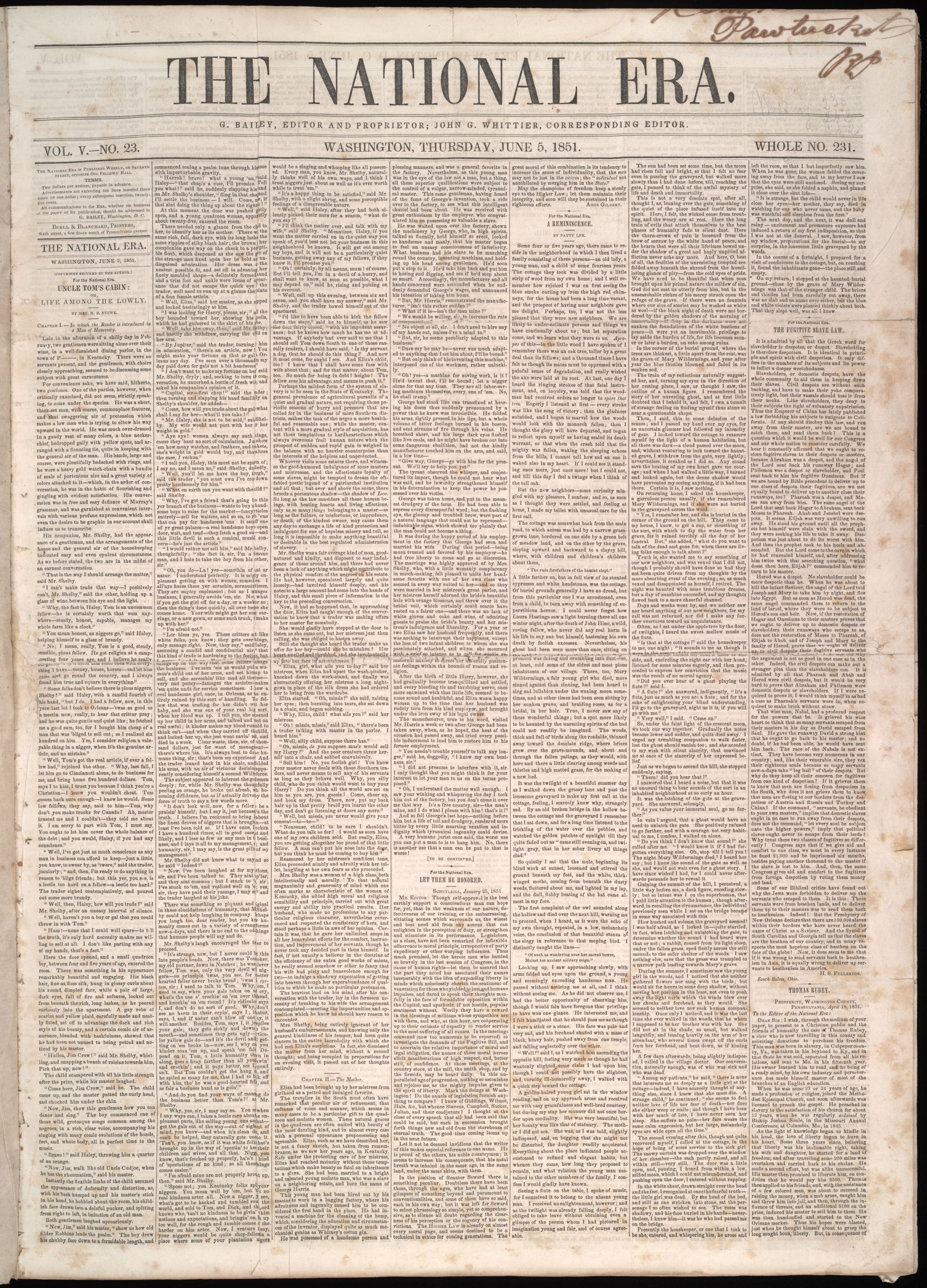
First appearance of Uncle Tom's Cabin as serialized in The National Era (June 5, 1851)

Uncle Tom's Cabin first appeared as a 40-week serial in The National Era, an abolitionist periodical, starting with the June 5, 1851, issue. It was originally intended as a shorter narrative that would run for only a few weeks. Stowe expanded the story significantly, however, and it was instantly popular, such that protests were sent to the Era office when she missed an issue. The final installment was released in the April 1, 1852, issue of Era. Stowe arranged for the story's copyright to be registered with the United States District Court for the District of Maine. She renewed her copyright in 1879 and the work entered the public domain on May 12, 1893.

While the story was still being serialized, the publisher John P. Jewett contracted with Stowe to turn Uncle Tom's Cabin into a book. Convinced the book would be popular, Jewett made the unusual decision (for the time) to have six full-page illustrations by Hammatt Billings engraved for the first printing. Published in book form on March 20, 1852, the novel sold 3,000 copies on that day alone, and soon sold out its complete print run. In the first year after it was published, 300,000 copies of the book were sold in the United States. Eight printing presses, running incessantly, could barely keep up with the demand.

By mid-1853, sales of the book dramatically decreased and Jewett went out of business during the Panic of 1857. In June 1860, the right to publish Uncle Tom's Cabin passed to the Boston firm Ticknor and Fields, which put the book back in print in November 1862. After that demand began to yet again increase. Houghton Mifflin Company acquired the rights from Ticknor in 1878. In 1879, a new edition of Uncle Tom's Cabin was released, repackaging the novel as an "American classic". Through the 1880s until its copyright expired, the book served as a mainstay and reliable source of income for Houghton Mifflin. By the end of the nineteenth century, the novel was widely available in a large number of editions and in the United States it became the second best-selling book of that century after the Bible.

Uncle Tom's Cabin sold equally well in Britain; the first London edition appeared in May 1852 and sold 200,000 copies. In a few years, over 1.5 million copies of the book were in circulation in Britain, although most of these were infringing copies (a similar situation occurred in the United States). By 1857, the novel had been translated into 20 languages. Translator Lin Shu published the first Chinese translation in 1901, making it the first American novel translated into that language.

== Plot ==
=== Eliza escapes with her son; Tom sold "down the river" ===
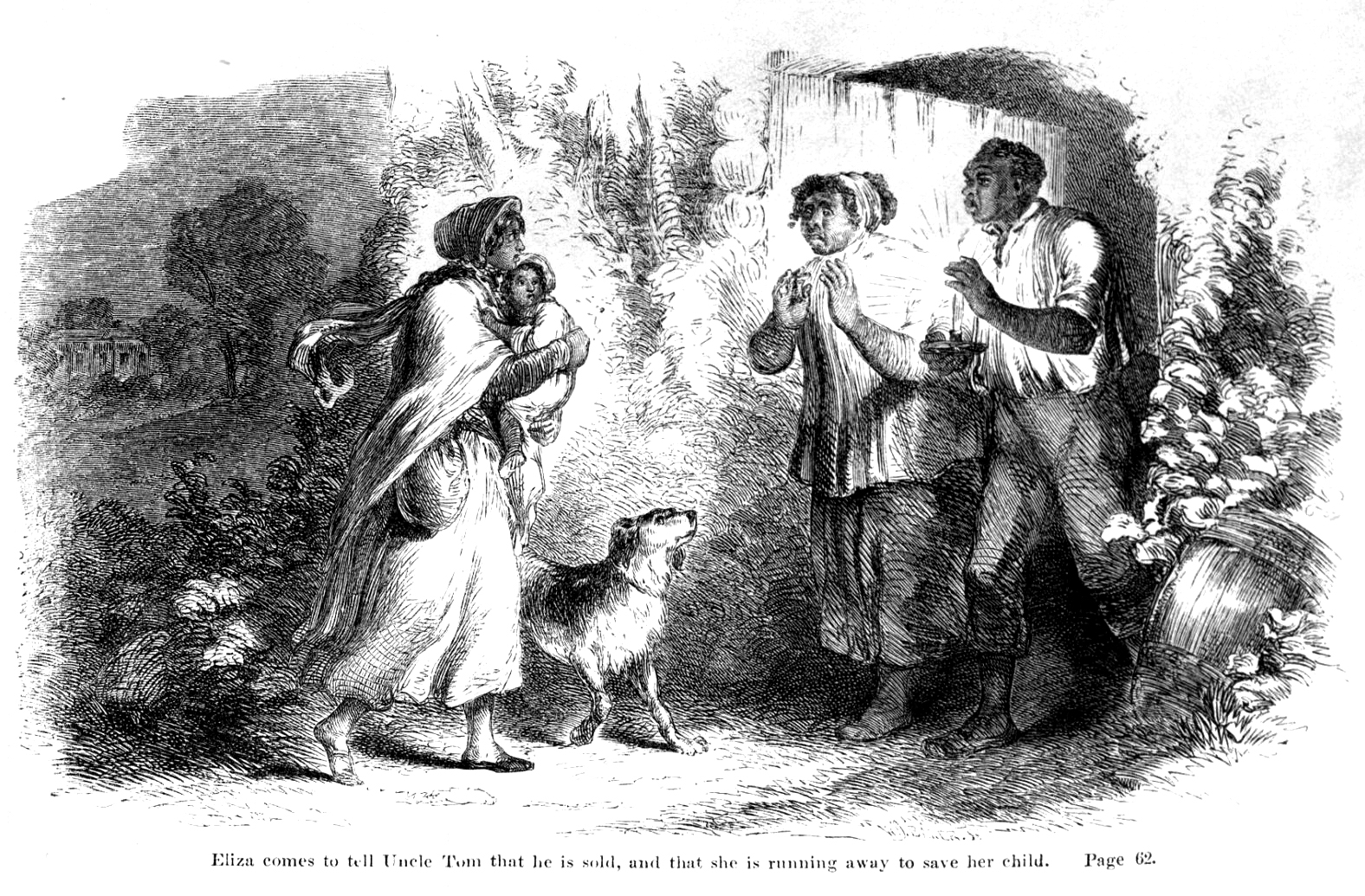
A full-page illustration by Hammatt Billings for the first edition of Uncle Tom's Cabin, 1852. Eliza tells Uncle Tom that he has been sold and she is running away to save her child.

The book opens with a Kentucky farmer named Arthur Shelby facing the loss of his farm because of debts. Even though he and his wife Emily Shelby believe that they have a benevolent relationship with their slaves, Shelby decides to raise the needed funds by selling two of them—Uncle Tom, a middle-aged man with a wife and children, and Harry, the son of Emily Shelby's maid Eliza—to Mr. Haley, a coarse slave trader. Emily Shelby is averse to this idea because she had promised her maid that her child would never be sold; Emily's son, George Shelby, hates to see Tom go because he sees the man as his friend and mentor.

When Eliza overhears Mr. and Mrs. Shelby discussing plans to sell Tom and Harry, Eliza determines to run away with her son. The novel states that Eliza made this decision because she fears losing her only surviving child (she had already miscarried two children). Eliza departs that night, leaving a note of apology to her mistress. She later makes a dangerous crossing over the ice of the Ohio River to escape her pursuers.

As Tom is sold, Mr. Haley takes him to a riverboat on the Mississippi River and from there Tom is to be transported to a slave market. While on board, Tom meets Eva, an angelic little white girl. They quickly become friends. Eva falls into the river and Tom dives into the river to save her life. Being grateful to Tom, Eva's father Augustine St. Clare buys him from Haley and takes him with the family to their home in New Orleans. Tom and Eva begin to relate to one another because of the deep Christian faith they both share.

=== Eliza's family hunted; Tom's life with St. Clare ===
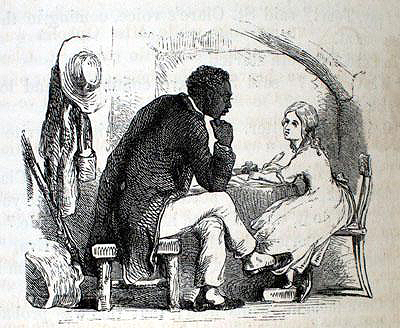
An illustration of Tom and Eva by Hammatt Billings for the 1853 deluxe edition of Uncle Tom's Cabin

During Eliza's escape, she meets up with her husband George Harris, who had run away previously. They decide to attempt to reach Canada but are tracked by Tom Loker, a slave hunter hired by Mr. Haley. Eventually Loker and his men trap Eliza and her family, causing George to shoot him in the side. Worried that Loker may die, Eliza convinces George to bring the slave hunter to a nearby Quaker settlement for medical treatment.

Back in New Orleans, St. Clare debates slavery with his Northern cousin Ophelia who, while opposing slavery, is prejudiced against black people. St. Clare, however, believes he is not biased, even though he is a slave owner. In an attempt to show Ophelia that her prejudiced views against black people are wrong, St. Clare purchases Topsy, a young black slave, and asks Ophelia to educate her.

After Tom has lived with the St. Clares for two years, Eva grows very ill. Before she dies she experiences a vision of heaven, which she shares with the people around her. As a result of her death and vision, the other characters resolve to change their lives, with Ophelia promising to throw off her personal prejudices against blacks, Topsy saying she will better herself, and St. Clare pledging to free Tom.

=== Tom sold to Simon Legree ===
Before St. Clare can follow through on his pledge, he dies after being stabbed outside a tavern. His wife reneges on her late husband's vow and sells Tom at auction to a vicious plantation owner named Simon Legree. Tom is taken to rural Louisiana with other new slaves including Emmeline, whom Legree has purchased to use as a sex slave.

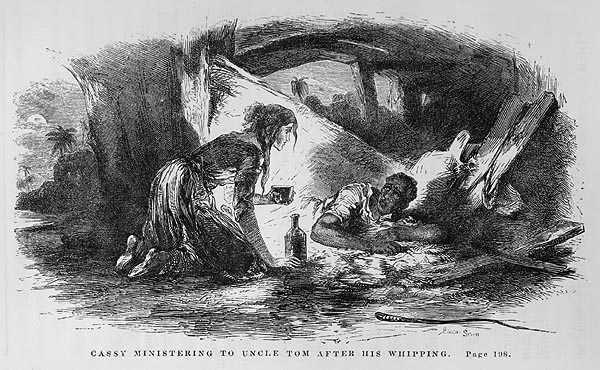
A full-page illustration by Hammatt Billings for the first edition of Uncle Tom's Cabin, 1852. Cassy, another of Legree's slaves, ministers to Uncle Tom after his whipping.

Legree begins to hate Tom when Tom refuses Legree's order to whip his fellow slave. Legree beats Tom viciously and resolves to crush his new slave's faith in God. Despite Legree's cruelty, Tom refuses to stop reading his Bible and comforting the other slaves as best he can. While at the plantation, Tom meets Cassy, another slave whom Legree used as a sex slave. Cassy tells her story to Tom. She was previously separated from her son and daughter when they were sold. She became pregnant again but killed the child because she could not tolerate having another child separated from her.

Tom Loker, changed after being healed by the Quakers, returns to the story. He has helped George, Eliza, and Harry enter Canada from Lake Erie and become free. In Louisiana, Uncle Tom almost succumbs to hopelessness as his faith in God is tested by the hardships of the plantation. He has two visions, one of Jesus and one of Eva, which renew his resolve to remain a faithful Christian, even unto death.

He encourages Cassy to escape, which she does, taking Emmeline with her. When Tom refuses to tell Legree where Cassy and Emmeline have gone, Legree orders his overseers to kill Tom. As Tom is dying, he forgives the overseers who savagely beat him. Humbled by the character of the man they have fatally wounded, both men become Christians. George Shelby, Arthur Shelby's son, arrives to buy Tom's freedom, but Tom dies shortly after they meet.

=== Final section ===
On their boat ride to freedom, Cassy and Emmeline meet George Harris' sister Madame de Thoux and accompany her to Canada. Madame de Thoux and George Harris were separated in their childhood. Cassy discovers that Eliza is her long-lost daughter who was sold as a child. Now that their family is together again, they travel to France and eventually Liberia, the African nation created for former American slaves. George Shelby returns to the Kentucky farm, where after his father's death, he frees all his slaves. George Shelby urges them to remember Tom's sacrifice every time they look at his cabin. He decides to lead a pious Christian life just as Uncle Tom did.

== Major characters ==
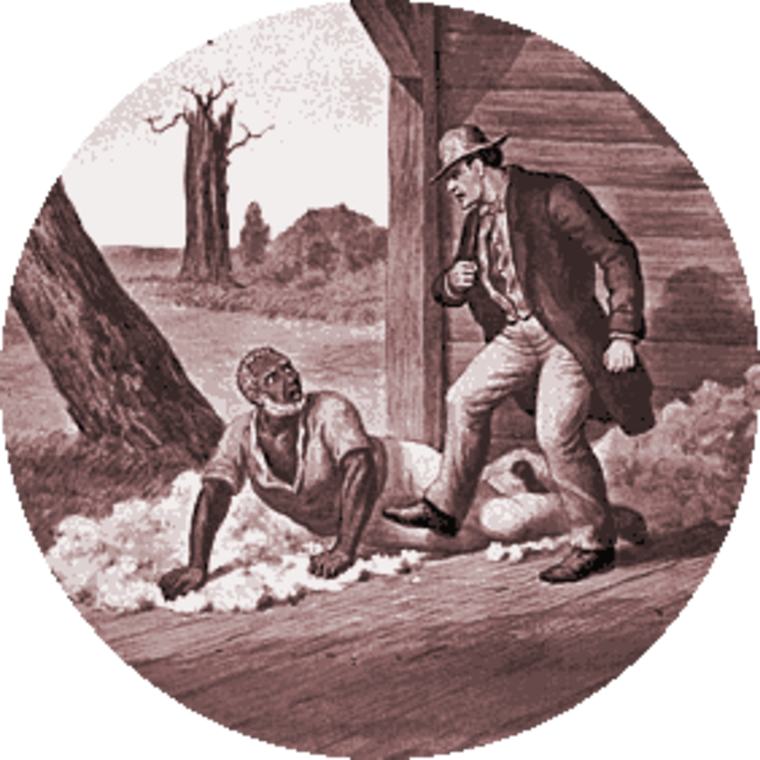
Simon Legree assaults Uncle Tom.

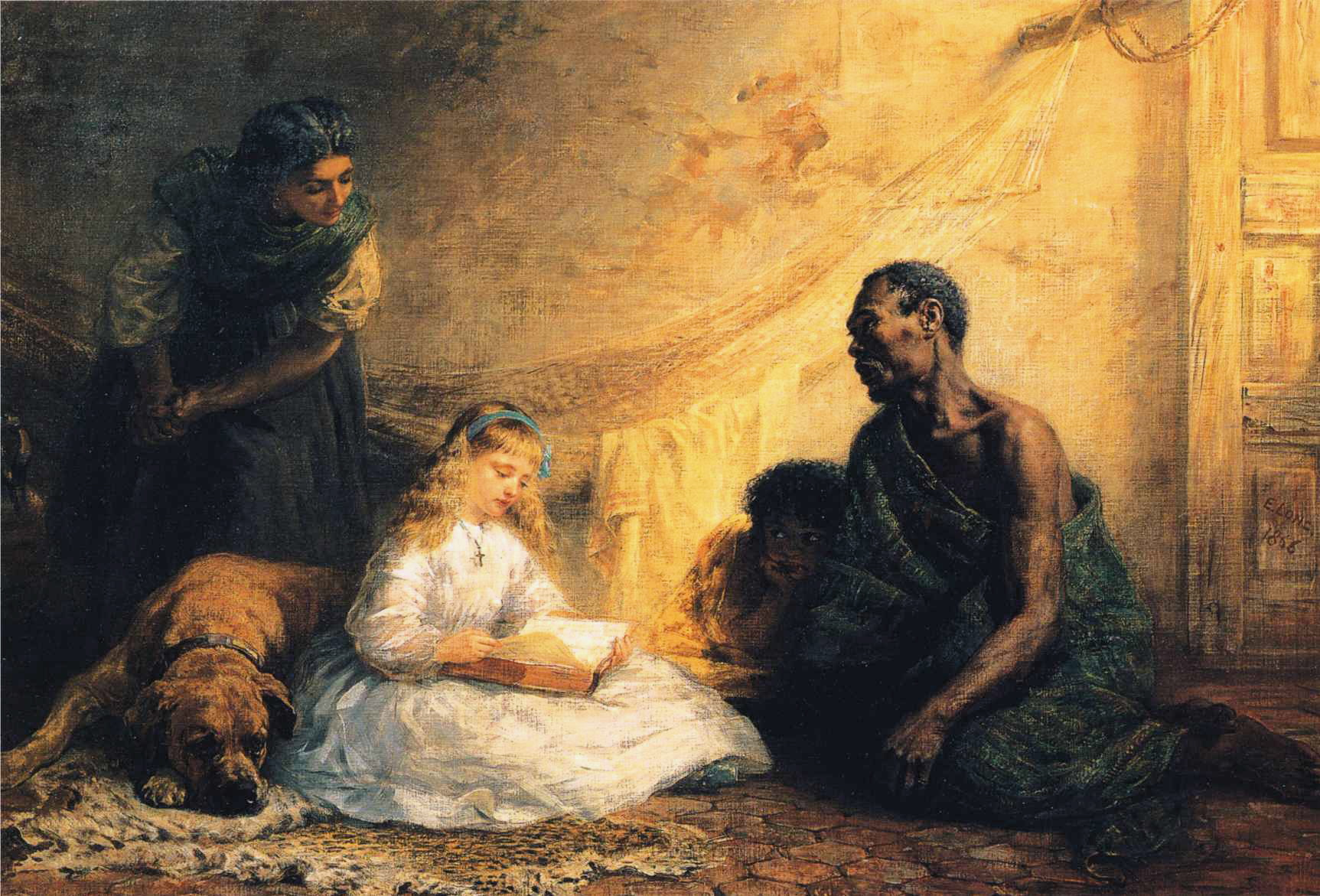
Uncle Tom and Little Eva, painting by Edwin Longsden Long, 1866

- Uncle Tom, the title character, was initially seen as a noble, long-suffering Christian slave. In more recent years, his name has become an epithet directed towards African Americans who are accused of selling out to whites. Stowe intended Tom to be a "noble hero" and a praiseworthy person. Throughout the book, far from allowing himself to be exploited, Tom stands up for his beliefs and refuses to betray friends and family.
- Eliza is a slave who serves as a personal maid to Mrs. Shelby. She escapes to the North with her five-year-old son Harry after he is sold to Mr. Haley. Her husband, George, eventually finds Eliza and Harry in Ohio and emigrates with them to Canada, then France, and finally Liberia. The character Eliza was inspired by an account given at Lane Theological Seminary in Cincinnati by John Rankin to Stowe's husband Calvin, a professor at the school. According to Rankin, in February 1838, a young slave woman, Eliza Harris, had escaped across the frozen Ohio River to the town of Ripley with her child in her arms and stayed at his house on her way farther north.
- Evangeline "Eva" St. Clare is the daughter of Augustine St. Clare. Eva enters the narrative when Uncle Tom is traveling via steamship to New Orleans to be sold, and he rescues the five- or six-year-old girl from drowning. Eva begs her father to buy Tom, and he becomes the head coachman at the St. Clare house. He spends most of his time with the angelic Eva. Eva often talks about love and forgiveness, convincing the dour slave girl Topsy that she deserves love. She even touches the heart of her Aunt Ophelia. Eventually Eva falls terminally ill. Before dying, she gives a lock of her hair to each of the slaves, telling them that they must become Christians so that they may see each other in Heaven. On her deathbed, she convinces her father to free Tom, but because of circumstances the promise never materializes.
- Simon Legree is a cruel slave owner—a Northerner by birth—whose name has become synonymous with greed and cruelty. He is arguably the novel's main antagonist. His goal is to demoralize Tom and break him of his religious faith; he eventually orders Tom whipped to death out of frustration for his slave's unbreakable belief in God. The novel reveals that, as a young man, he had abandoned his sickly mother for a life at sea and ignored her letter to see her one last time at her deathbed. He sexually exploits Cassy, who despises him, and later sets his designs on Emmeline. It is unclear if Legree is based on any actual individuals. Reports surfaced in the late 1800s that Stowe had in mind a wealthy cotton and sugar plantation owner named Meredith Calhoun, who settled on the Red River north of Alexandria, Louisiana. Rev. Josiah Henson, inspiration for the character of Uncle Tom, said that Legree was modeled after Bryce Lytton, "who broke my arm and maimed me for life."

== Literary themes and theories ==
=== Major themes ===
Uncle Tom's Cabin is dominated by a single theme: the evil and immorality of slavery. While Stowe weaves other subthemes throughout her text, such as the moral authority of motherhood and the power of Christian love, she emphasizes the connections between these and the horrors of slavery. Stowe sometimes changed the story's voice so she could give a "homily" on the destructive nature of slavery (such as when a white woman on the steamboat carrying Tom further south states, "The most dreadful part of slavery, to my mind, is its outrages of feelings and affections—the separating of families, for example."). One way Stowe showed the evil of slavery was how this "peculiar institution" forcibly separated families from each other.

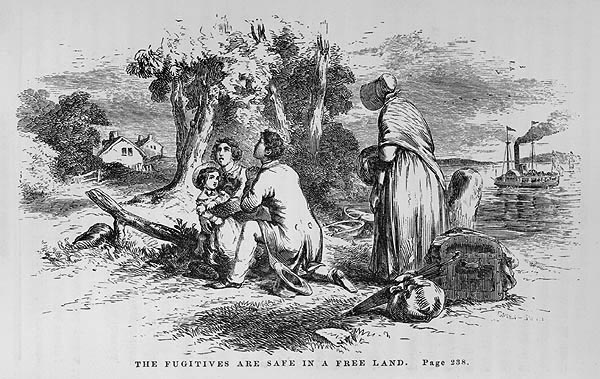
"The fugitives are safe in a free land." Illustration by Hammatt Billings for Uncle Tom's Cabin, first edition. The image shows George Harris, Eliza, Harry, and Mrs. Smyth after they escape to freedom.

One of the subthemes presented in the novel is temperance. Stowe made it somewhat subtle and in some cases she wove it into events that would also support the dominant theme. One example of this is when Augustine St. Clare is killed, he attempted to stop a brawl between two inebriated men in a cafe and was stabbed. Another example is the death of Prue, who was whipped to death for being drunk on a consistent basis; however, her reason for doing so is due to the loss of her baby. In the opening of the novel, the fates of Eliza and her son are being discussed between slave owners over wine. Considering that Stowe intended this to be a subtheme, this scene could foreshadow future events that put alcohol in a bad light.

Because Stowe saw motherhood as the "ethical and structural model for all of American life" and also believed that only women had the moral authority to save the United States from the demon of slavery, another major theme of Uncle Tom's Cabin is the moral power and sanctity of women. Through characters like Eliza, who escapes from slavery to save her young son (and eventually reunites her entire family), or Eva, who is seen as the "ideal Christian", Stowe shows how she believed women could save those around them from even the worst injustices. Though later critics have noted that Stowe's female characters are often domestic clichés instead of realistic women, Stowe's novel "reaffirmed the importance of women's influence" and helped pave the way for the women's rights movement in the following decades.

Stowe's puritanical religious beliefs show up in the novel's final, overarching theme—the exploration of the nature of Christian love and how she feels Christian theology is fundamentally incompatible with slavery. This theme is most evident when Tom urges St. Clare to "look away to Jesus" after the death of St. Clare's beloved daughter Eva. After Tom dies, George Shelby eulogizes Tom by saying, "What a thing it is to be a Christian." Because Christian themes play such a large role in Uncle Tom's Cabin—and because of Stowe's frequent use of direct authorial interjections on religion and faith—the novel often takes the "form of a sermon".

=== Literary theories ===
Over the years scholars have postulated a number of theories about what Stowe was trying to say with the novel (aside from the major theme of condemning slavery). For example, as an ardent Christian and active abolitionist, Stowe placed many of her religious beliefs into the novel. Some scholars have stated that Stowe saw her novel as offering a solution to the moral and political dilemma that troubled many slavery opponents: whether engaging in prohibited behavior was justified in opposing evil. Was the use of violence to oppose the violence of slavery and the breaking of proslavery laws morally defensible? Which of Stowe's characters should be emulated, the passive Uncle Tom or the defiant George Harris? Stowe's solution was similar to Ralph Waldo Emerson's: God's will would be followed if each person sincerely examined his principles and acted on them.

Scholars have also seen the novel as expressing the values and ideas of the Free Will Movement. In this view, the character of George Harris embodies the principles of free labor, and the complex character of Ophelia represents those Northerners who condoned compromise with slavery. In contrast to Ophelia is Dinah, who operates on passion. During the course of the novel Ophelia is transformed, just as the Republican Party (three years later) proclaimed that the North must transform itself and stand up for its antislavery principles.

Feminist theory can also be seen at play in Stowe's book, with the novel as a critique of the patriarchal nature of slavery. For Stowe, blood relations rather than paternalistic relations between masters and slaves formed the basis of families. Moreover, Stowe viewed national solidarity as an extension of a person's family, thus feelings of nationality stemmed from possessing a shared race. Consequently, she advocated African colonization for freed slaves and not amalgamation into American society.

The book has also been seen as an attempt to redefine masculinity as a necessary step toward the abolition of slavery. In this view, abolitionists had begun to resist the vision of aggressive and dominant men that the conquest and colonization of the early 19th century had fostered. To change the notion of manhood so that men could oppose slavery without jeopardizing their self-image or their standing in society, some abolitionists drew on principles of women's suffrage and Christianity as well as passivism, and praised men for cooperation, compassion, and civic spirit. Others within the abolitionist movement argued for conventional, aggressive masculine action. All the men in Stowe's novel are representations of either one kind of man or the other.

== Style ==
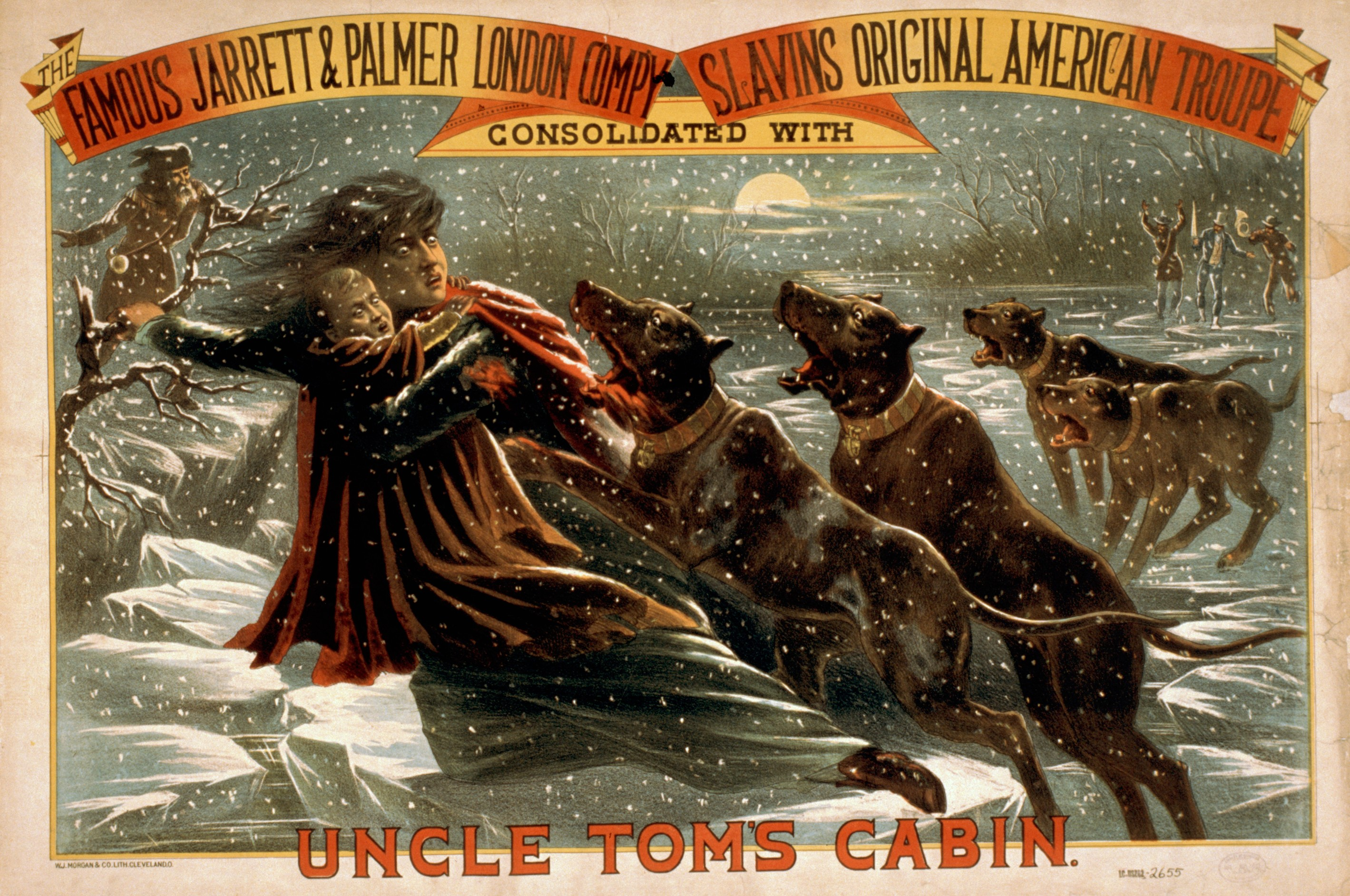
Eliza crossing the icy river, in an 1881 theatre poster

Uncle Tom's Cabin is written in the sentimental and melodramatic style common to 19th-century sentimental novels and domestic fiction (also called women's fiction). These genres were the most popular novels of Stowe's time and were "written by, for, and about women" along with featuring a writing style that evoked a reader's sympathy and emotion. Uncle Tom's Cabin has been called a "representative" example of a sentimental novel.

The power in this type of writing can be seen in the reaction of contemporary readers. Georgiana May, a friend of Stowe's, wrote a letter to the author, saying: "I was up last night long after one o'clock, reading and finishing Uncle Tom's Cabin. I could not leave it any more than I could have left a dying child." Another reader is described as obsessing on the book at all hours and having considered renaming her daughter Eva. Evidently the death of Little Eva affected a lot of people at that time, because in 1852, 300 baby girls in Boston alone were given that name.

Despite this positive reaction from readers, for decades literary critics dismissed the style found in Uncle Tom's Cabin and other sentimental novels because these books were written by women and so prominently featured what one critic called "women's sloppy emotions". Another literary critic said that had the novel not been about slavery, "it would be just another sentimental novel", and another described the book as "primarily a derivative piece of hack work". In The Literary History of the United States, George F. Whicher called Uncle Tom's Cabin "Sunday-school fiction", full of "broadly conceived melodrama, humor, and pathos".

In 1985 Jane Tompkins expressed a different view with her famous defense of the book in "Sentimental Power: Uncle Tom's Cabin and the Politics of Literary History." Tompkins praised the style so many other critics had dismissed, writing that sentimental novels showed how women's emotions had the power to change the world for the better. She also said that the popular domestic novels of the 19th century, including Uncle Tom's Cabin, were remarkable for their "intellectual complexity, ambition, and resourcefulness"; and that Uncle Tom's Cabin offers a "critique of American society far more devastating than any delivered by better-known critics such as Hawthorne and Melville."

== Reactions to the novel ==
Uncle Tom's Cabin has exerted an influence equaled by few other novels in history. Upon publication, Uncle Tom's Cabin ignited a firestorm of protest from defenders of slavery (who created a number of books in response to the novel) while the book elicited praise from abolitionists. The novel is considered an influential "landmark" of protest literature.

=== Contemporary reaction in United States and around the world ===
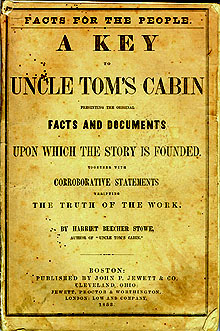
Stowe responded to criticism by writing A Key to Uncle Tom's Cabin (1853), documenting the veracity of her novel's depiction of slavery.

Uncle Tom's Cabin had an "incalculable" influence on the 19th-century world and captured the imagination of many Americans. In a likely apocryphal story that alludes to the novel's influence, when Abraham Lincoln met Stowe in 1862 he supposedly commented, "So this is the little lady who started this great war." Historians are undecided if Lincoln actually said this line, and in a letter that Stowe wrote to her husband a few hours after meeting with Lincoln no mention of this comment was made. Many writers have also credited the novel with focusing Northern anger at the injustices of slavery and the Fugitive Slave Law and helping to fuel the abolitionist movement. Union general and politician James Baird Weaver said that the book convinced him to become active in the abolitionist movement.

Frederick Douglass was "convinced both of the social uses of the novel and of Stowe's humanitarianism" and heavily promoted the novel in his newspaper, Frederick Douglass' Paper, during the book's initial release. Though Douglass said Uncle Tom's Cabin was "a work of marvelous depth and power," he also published criticism of the novel, most prominently by Martin Delany. In a series of letters in the newspaper, Delany accused Stowe of "borrowing (and thus profiting) from the work of black writers to compose her novel" and chastised Stowe for her "apparent support of black colonization to Africa." Delany was "one of the most out-spoken black critics" of Uncle Tom's Cabin at the time and later wrote Blake; or the Huts of America, a novel where an African American "chooses violent rebellion over Tom's resignation."

White Southerners were outraged at the novel's release, with the book being also roundly criticized by proslavery Americans. Southern novelist William Gilmore Simms declared the work utterly false while also calling it slanderous. Reactions ranged from a bookseller in Mobile, Alabama, being forced to leave town for selling the novel to threatening letters sent to Stowe (including a package containing a slave's severed ear). Many Southern writers, like Simms, soon wrote their own books in opposition to Stowe's novel.

Some critics highlighted Stowe's paucity of life-experience relating to Southern life, saying that it led her to create inaccurate descriptions of the region. For instance, she had never been to a Southern plantation. Stowe always said she based the characters of her book on stories she was told by runaway slaves in Cincinnati. It is reported that "She observed firsthand several incidents which galvanized her to write [the] famous anti-slavery novel. Scenes she observed on the Ohio River, including seeing a husband and wife being sold apart, as well as newspaper and magazine accounts and interviews, contributed material to the emerging plot."

In response to these criticisms, in 1853 Stowe published A Key to Uncle Tom's Cabin, an attempt to document the veracity of the novel's depiction of slavery. In the book, Stowe discusses each of the major characters in Uncle Tom's Cabin and cites "real life equivalents" to them while also mounting a more "aggressive attack on slavery in the South than the novel itself had". Like the novel, A Key to Uncle Tom's Cabin was a best-seller, but although Stowe claimed A Key to Uncle Tom's Cabin documented her previously consulted sources, she actually read many of the cited works only after the publication of her novel.

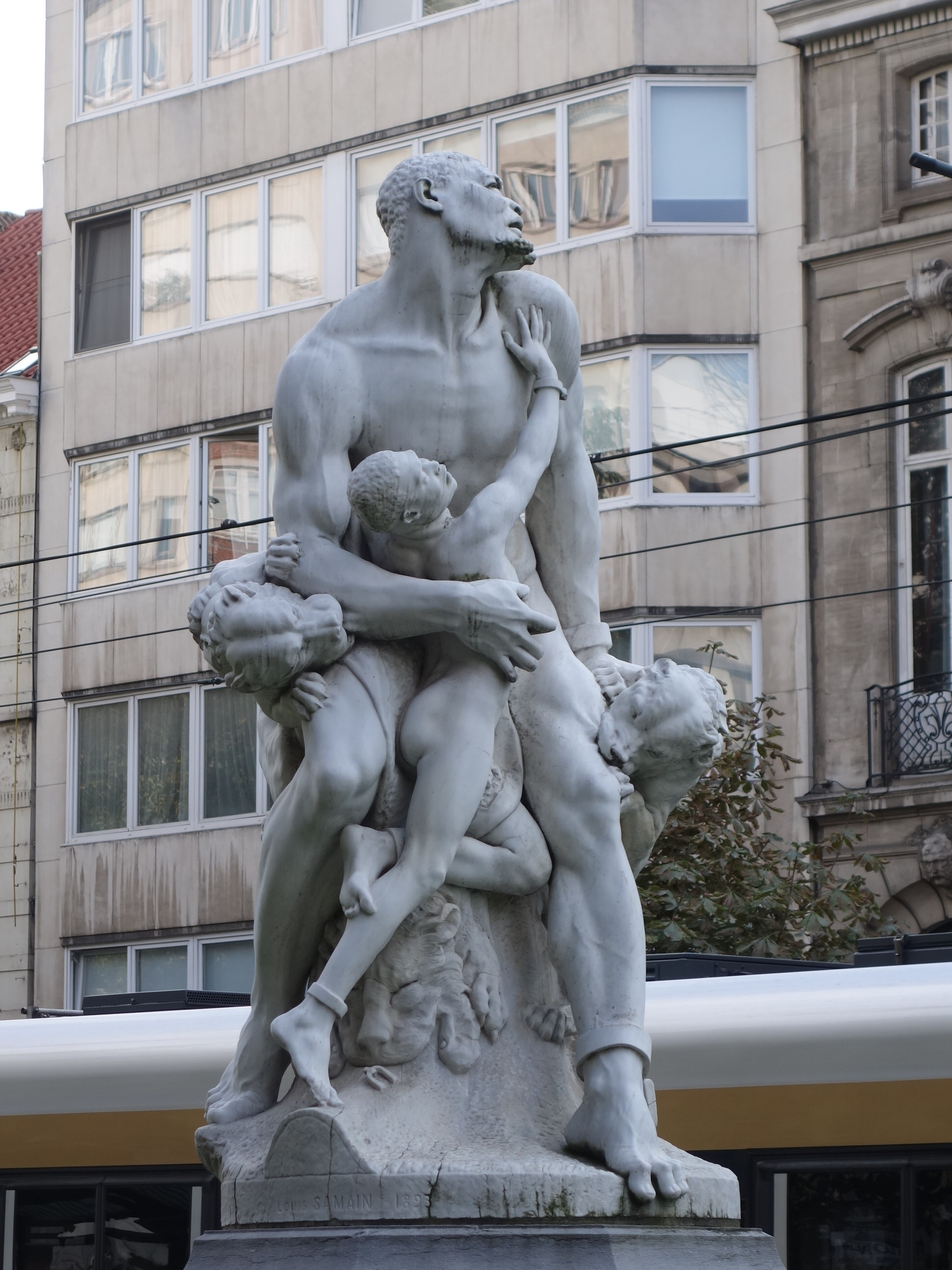
A sculpture after an 1869 design by Louis Samain was installed in 1895 on Avenue Louise in Brussels. The scene—a runaway black slave and child attacked by dogs—was inspired by Uncle Tom's Cabin.

Uncle Tom's Cabin also created great interest in the United Kingdom. The first London edition appeared in May 1852 and sold 200,000 copies. Some of this interest was due to anti-Americanism in Britain. As English lawyer Nassau William Senior argued:

The evil passions which Uncle Tom gratified in England were not hatred or vengeance, but national jealousy and national vanity. We have long been smarting under the conceit of America—we are tired of hearing her boast that she is the freest and the most enlightened country that the world has ever seen. Our clergy hate her voluntary system—our Tories hate her democrats—our Whigs hate her parvenus—our Radicals hate her litigiousness, her insolence, and her ambition. All parties hailed Mrs. Stowe as a revolter from the enemy... She taught us how to prove that democrats may be tyrants, that an aristocracy of caste is more oppressive than an aristocracy of station... Our pity for the victim is swallowed up by our hatred of the tyrant."

Stowe sent a copy of the book to Charles Dickens, who wrote her in response: "I have read your book with the deepest interest and sympathy, and admire, more than I can express to you, both the generous feeling which inspired it, and the admirable power with which it is executed." The historian and politician Thomas Babington Macaulay wrote in 1852 that "it is the most valuable addition that America has made to English literature." Charles Francis Adams Sr., the American ambassador to Britain during the Civil War, argued later that "Uncle Tom's Cabin; or Life among the Lowly, published in 1852, exercised, largely from fortuitous circumstances, a more immediate, considerable and dramatic world-influence than any other book ever printed." In 1852, a German translation was published in Germany. Sanders Isaac Bernstein, writing for the University of Southern California, wrote that it "was immensely popular" in that country resulting in both "a fascination with the seemingly simpler life" of someone enslaved while also stoking anti-slavery feelings, as well as "a cottage industry" of adaptations.

Leo Tolstoy claimed that Uncle Tom's Cabin was a greater work than any play written by Shakespeare because it flowed from the love of God and man.

=== 20th century and modern criticism ===
In the 20th century, a number of writers attacked Uncle Tom's Cabin not only for the stereotypes the novel had created about African Americans but also because of "the utter disdain of the Tom character by the black community". These writers included Richard Wright with his collection Uncle Tom's Children (1938) and Chester Himes with his 1943 short story "Heaven Has Changed". Ralph Ellison also critiqued the book with his 1952 novel Invisible Man, with Ellison figuratively killing Uncle Tom in the opening chapter.

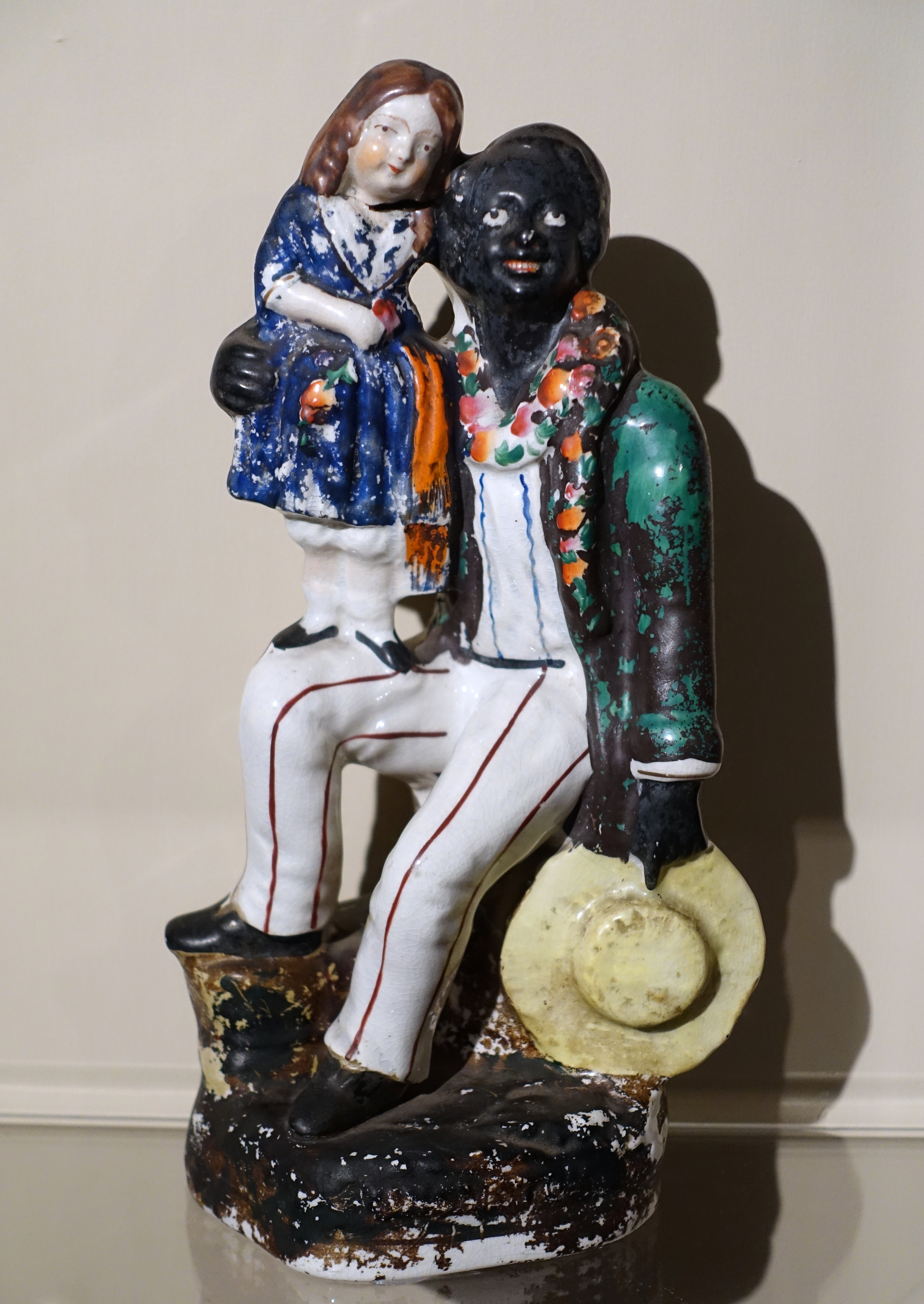
Uncle Tom and Eva, a Staffordshire figure produced between 1855 and 1860

In 1945 James Baldwin published his influential and infamous critical essay "Everybody's Protest Novel". In the essay, Baldwin described Uncle Tom's Cabin as "a bad novel, having, in its self-righteousness, virtuous sentimentality". He argued that the novel lacked psychological depth, and that Stowe, "was not so much a novelist as an impassioned pamphleteer". Edward Rothstein has claimed that Baldwin missed the point and that the purpose of the novel was "to treat slavery not as a political issue but as an individually human one – and ultimately a challenge to Christianity itself."

George Orwell in his essay "Good Bad Books", first published in Tribune in November 1945, claims that "perhaps the supreme example of the 'good bad' book is Uncle Tom's Cabin. It is an unintentionally ludicrous book, full of preposterous melodramatic incidents; it is also deeply moving and essentially true; it is hard to say which quality outweighs the other." But he concludes "I would back Uncle Tom's Cabin to outlive the complete works of Virginia Woolf or George Moore, though I know of no strictly literary test which would show where the superiority lies."

The negative associations related to Uncle Tom's Cabin, in particular how the novel and associated plays created and popularized racial stereotypes, have to some extent obscured the book's historical significance as a "vital antislavery tool". After the turn of the millennium, scholars such as Henry Louis Gates Jr. and Hollis Robbins have re-examined Uncle Tom's Cabin in what has been called a "serious attempt to resurrect it as both a central document in American race relations and a significant moral and political exploration of the character of those relations."

In China, Uncle Tom's Cabin experienced a revival of interest in the early 1960s. In the Chinese communist view of the book, Uncle Tom was interpreted as having been betrayed by his "Christian consciousness." In 1961, Sun Weishi directed a stage play adaptation of the book. The revival of interest in Uncle Tom's Cabin intersected with the translation and popularization of works by W. E. B. Du Bois, who was viewed as having developed a new spirit of Black resistance.

=== Literary significance ===
Generally recognized as the first best-selling novel, Uncle Tom's Cabin greatly influenced development of not only American literature but also protest literature in general. Later books that owe a large debt to Uncle Tom's Cabin include The Jungle by Upton Sinclair and Silent Spring by Rachel Carson.

Despite this undisputed significance, Uncle Tom's Cabin has been called "a blend of children's fable and propaganda". The novel has also been dismissed by several literary critics as "merely a sentimental novel"; critic George Whicher stated in his Literary History of the United States that "Nothing attributable to Mrs. Stowe or her handiwork can account for the novel's enormous vogue; its author's resources as a purveyor of Sunday-school fiction were not remarkable. She had at most a ready command of broadly conceived melodrama, humor, and pathos, and of these popular sentiments she compounded her book."

Other critics, though, have praised the novel. Edmund Wilson stated that "To expose oneself in maturity to Uncle Tom's Cabin may therefore prove a startling experience. It is a much more impressive work than one has ever been allowed to suspect." Jane Tompkins stated that the novel is one of the classics of American literature and wonders if many literary critics dismiss the book because it was simply too popular during its day.

== Creation and popularization of stereotypes ==
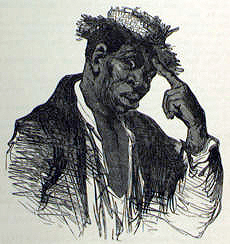
An illustration of Sam from the 1888 "New Edition" of Uncle Tom's Cabin. The character of Sam helped create the stereotype of the lazy, carefree "happy darky".

Many modern scholars and readers have criticized the book for condescending racist descriptions of the black characters' appearances, speech, and behavior, as well as the passive nature of Uncle Tom in accepting his fate. The novel's creation and use of common stereotypes about African Americans is significant because Uncle Tom's Cabin was the best-selling novel in the world during the 19th century. As a result, the book (along with illustrations from the book and associated stage productions) played a major role in perpetuating and solidifying such stereotypes into the American psyche.

In the 1960s and 1970s, the Black Power and Black Arts Movements attacked the novel, claiming that the character of Uncle Tom engaged in "race betrayal", and that Tom made slaves out to be worse than slave owners.

Among the stereotypes of blacks in Uncle Tom's Cabin are the "happy darky" (in the lazy, carefree character of Sam); the light-skinned tragic mulatto as a sex object (in the characters of Eliza, Cassy, and Emmeline); the affectionate, dark-skinned female mammy (through several characters, including Mammy, a cook at the St. Clare plantation); the pickaninny stereotype of black children (in the character of Topsy); and the Uncle Tom, an African American who is too eager to please white people.

Stowe intended Tom to be a "noble hero" and a Christ-like figure who, like Jesus at his crucifixion, forgives the people responsible for his death. The false stereotype of Tom as a "subservient fool who bows down to the white man", and the resulting derogatory term "Uncle Tom", resulted from staged "Tom Shows", which sometimes replaced Tom's grim death with an upbeat ending where Tom causes his oppressors to see the error of their ways, and they all reconcile happily. Stowe had no control over these shows and their alteration of her story.

== Anti-Tom literature ==
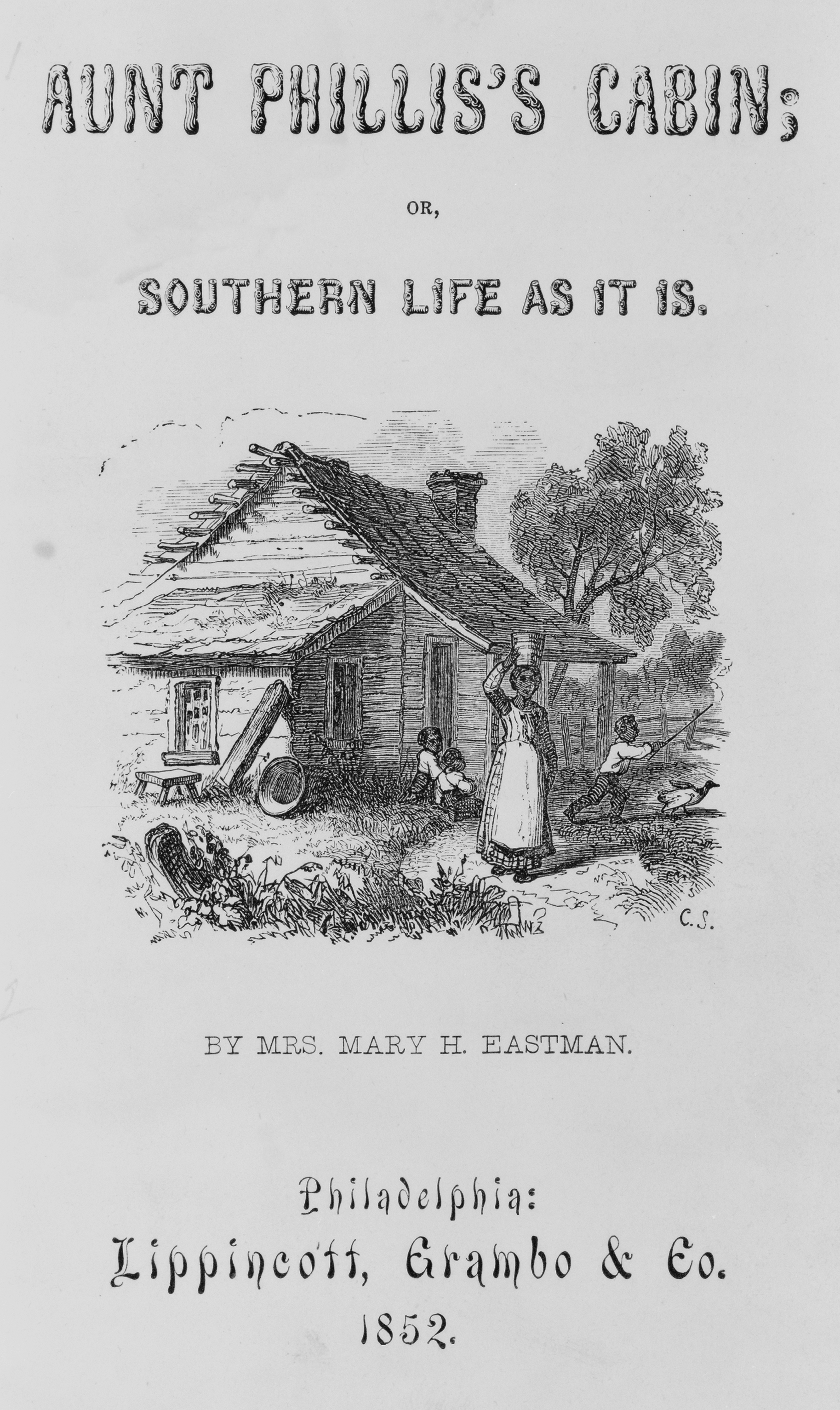
Title page for Aunt Phillis's Cabin by Mary Eastman, one of many examples of anti-Tom literature

In response to Uncle Tom's Cabin, writers in the Southern United States produced a number of books to rebut Stowe's novel. Uncle Tom's Cabin was published in 1852, and very quickly seven Anti-Tom novels were published in 1852 and six more in 1853. This so-called Anti-Tom literature generally took a pro-slavery viewpoint, arguing that the issues of slavery as depicted in Stowe's book were overblown and incorrect. The novels in this genre tended to feature a benign white patriarchal master and a pure wife, both of whom presided over childlike slaves in a benevolent extended family style plantation. The novels either implied or directly stated that African Americans were a childlike people unable to live their lives without being directly overseen by white people.

Among the most famous anti-Tom books are The Sword and the Distaff by William Gilmore Simms, Aunt Phillis's Cabin by Mary Henderson Eastman, and The Planter's Northern Bride by Caroline Lee Hentz, with the last author having been a close personal friend of Stowe's when the two lived in Cincinnati. Simms' book was published a few months after Stowe's novel, and it contains a number of sections and discussions disputing Stowe's book and her view of slavery. Hentz's 1854 novel, widely read at the time but now largely forgotten, offers a defense of slavery as seen through the eyes of a Northern woman—the daughter of an abolitionist, no less—who marries a Southern slave owner.

In the decade between the publication of Uncle Tom's Cabin and the start of the American Civil War, between twenty and thirty anti-Tom books were published (although others continued to be published after the war, including The Leopard's Spots in 1902 by "professional racist" Thomas Dixon Jr.). More than half of these anti-Tom books were written by white women, Simms commenting at one point about the "Seemingly poetic justice of having the Northern woman (Stowe) answered by a Southern woman."

== Dramatic adaptations ==
=== Plays and Tom shows ===
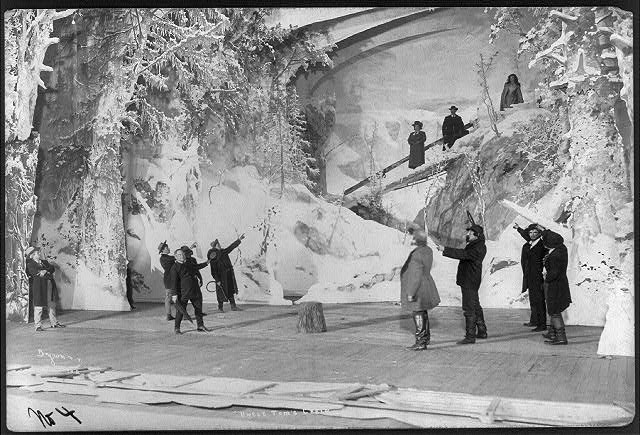
Scene in William A. Brady's 1901 revival of the play at the Academy of Music, New York City

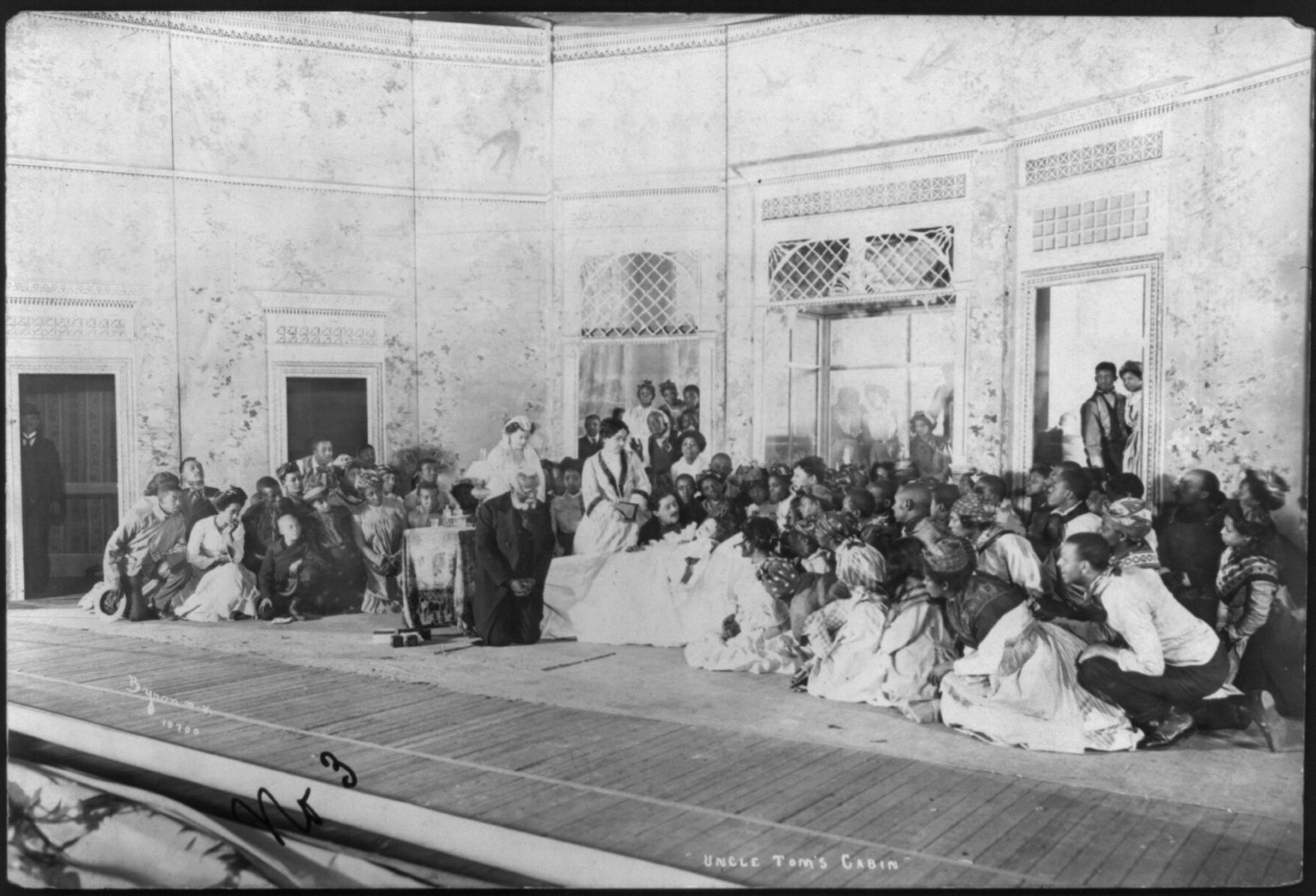
Little Eva's death scene in Brady's 1901 revival at the Academy of Music

Even though Uncle Tom's Cabin was the best-selling novel of the 19th century, far more Americans of that time saw the story as a stage play or musical than read the book. Historian Eric Lott estimated that "for every one of the three hundred thousand who bought the novel in its first year, many more eventually saw the play." In 1902, it was reported that a quarter million of these presentations had already been performed in the United States.

Given the lax copyright laws of the time, stage plays based on Uncle Tom's Cabin—"Tom shows"—began to appear while the novel was still being serialized. Stowe refused to authorize dramatization of her work because of her distrust of drama, although she eventually saw George L. Aiken's version and, according to Francis Underwood, was "delighted" by Caroline Howard's portrayal of Topsy. Aiken's stage production was the most popular play in the U.S. and Britain for 75 years. Stowe's refusal to authorize a particular dramatic version left the field clear for any number of adaptations, some launched for (various) political reasons and others as simply commercial theatrical ventures.

No international copyright laws existed at the time. The book and plays were translated into several languages. Stowe received no money, which could have meant as much as "three-fourths of her just and legitimate wages".

All the Tom shows appear to have incorporated elements of melodrama and blackface minstrelsy. These plays varied tremendously in their politics—some faithfully reflected Stowe's sentimentalized antislavery politics, while others were more moderate, or even pro-slavery. Many of the productions featured demeaning racial caricatures of black people; some productions also featured songs by Stephen Foster, including "My Old Kentucky Home", "Old Folks at Home", and "Massa's in the Cold Ground". The best-known Tom shows were those of George Aiken and H. J. Conway.

The many stage variants of Uncle Tom's Cabin "dominated northern popular culture ... for several years" during the 19th century, and the plays were still being performed in the early 20th century.

A stage adaptation (Black Slave's Cry to Heaven) by the Spring Willow Society was instrumental in developing the theatrical style of spoken word drama in China. At the time of the production, Uncle Tom's Cabin had become popular in China as a result of its translation by Lin Shu. The novel's opposition to racial prejudice resonated with many younger Chinese.

=== Films ===
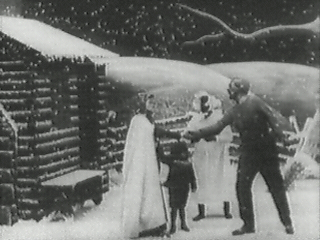
A still from Edwin S. Porter's 1903 version of Uncle Tom's Cabin, which was one of the first full-length movies. The still shows Eliza telling Uncle Tom that he has been sold and that she is running away to save her child.

Uncle Tom's Cabin has been adapted several times as a film. Most of these movies were created during the silent film era (Uncle Tom's Cabin was the most-filmed book of that time period). Because of the continuing popularity of both the book and "Tom" shows, audiences were already familiar with the characters and the plot, making it easier for the film to be understood without spoken words.

The first film version of Uncle Tom's Cabin was one of the earliest full-length movies, although full-length at that time meant between 10 and 14 minutes. This 1903 film, directed by Edwin S. Porter, used white actors in blackface in the major roles and black performers only as extras. This version was evidently similar to many of the "Tom Shows" of earlier decades and featured several stereotypes about blacks, such as having the slaves dance in almost any context, including at a slave auction.

In 1910, a three-reel Vitagraph Company of America production was directed by J. Stuart Blackton and adapted by Eugene Mullin. According to The Dramatic Mirror, this film was "a decided innovation" in motion pictures and "the first time an American company" released a dramatic film in three reels. Until then, full-length movies of the time were 15 minutes long and contained only one reel of film. The movie starred Florence Turner, Mary Fuller, Edwin R. Phillips, Flora Finch, Genevieve Tobin and Carlyle Blackwell, Sr.

At least four more movie adaptations were created in the next two decades. The last silent film version was released in 1927. Directed by Harry A. Pollard, who played Uncle Tom in a 1913 release of Uncle Tom's Cabin, this two-hour movie was more than a year in production and was the third most expensive picture of the silent era, at a cost of $1.8 million. The black actor Charles Gilpin was originally cast in the title role, but he was fired after the studio decided his "portrayal was too aggressive".

For several decades after the end of the silent film era, the subject matter of Stowe's novel was judged too sensitive for further film interpretation. In 1946, Metro-Goldwyn-Mayer considered filming the story but ceased production after protests led by the National Association for the Advancement of Colored People. The story was adapted as a play within the musical film version of The King & I. Within the main story, the character of Anna Leonowens gives Tuptim a copy of the book of Uncle Tom's Cabin. Tuptim relates to the anti-slavery themes of the book, and adapts it in to a traditional Siamese play for a state dinner. In this version, called "The Small House of Uncle Thomas", the characters are re-written as Buddhists. This version eliminates most of the white slave owners as characters, and focuses only on Tom, Simon, Eliza, Eva, and Topsy. Film versions were created overseas in the following decades, including a 1965 German-language version and a TV soap opera in Brazil called A Cabana do Pai Tomás, which ran for 205 episodes from July 1969 to March 1970. The final film version was a television broadcast in 1987, directed by Stan Lathan and adapted by John Gay. It starred Avery Brooks, Phylicia Rashad, Edward Woodward, Jenny Lewis, Samuel L. Jackson and Endyia Kinney.

In addition to film adaptations, versions of Uncle Tom's Cabin have been produced in other formats, including a number of animated cartoons. Uncle Tom's Cabin also influenced movies, including The Birth of a Nation. This controversial 1915 film set the dramatic climax in a slave cabin similar to that of Uncle Tom, where several white Southerners unite with their former enemy (Yankee soldiers) to defend, according to the film's caption, their "Aryan birthright". According to scholars, this reuse of such a familiar image of a slave cabin would have resonated with, and been understood by, audiences of the time.

== See also ==
- History of slavery in the United States
- Origins of the American Civil War
- Ramona, an 1884 novel that attempted to do for Native Americans in California what Uncle Tom's Cabin had done for African Americans
- Timeline of the civil rights movement
