= 1853 in literature =

This article contains information about the literary events and publications of 1853.

== Events ==
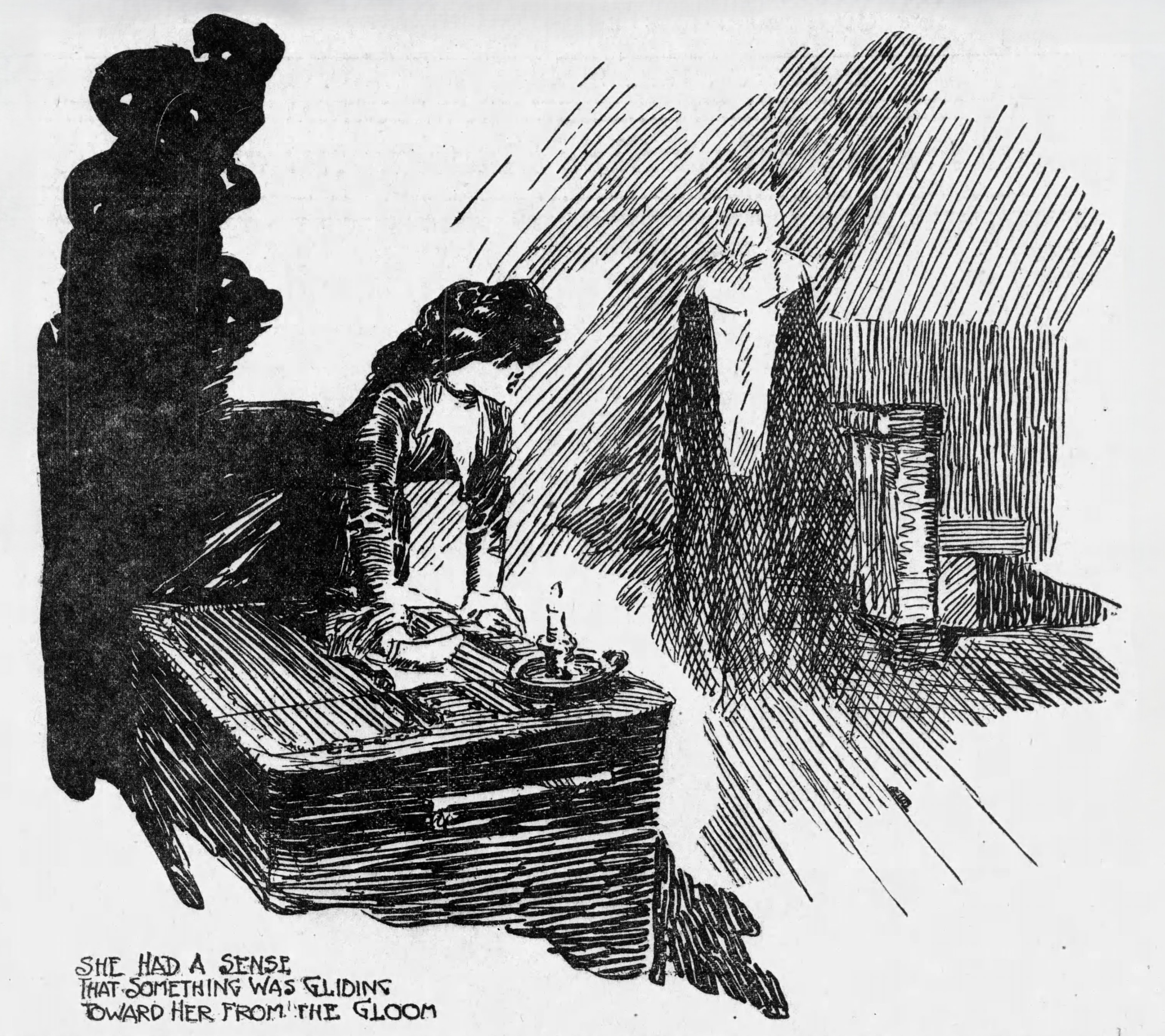
Newspaper illustration from abridged version of Villette, 1909

- January 28 – Charlotte Brontë's novel Villette appears (as by Currer Bell), its publication having been delayed in order to allow Ruth, by her friend Elizabeth Gaskell, to be given a head start in the press.
- September – The 20th and final instalment of Charles Dickens's Bleak House is published, followed shortly by its book publication.
- November – Poet Friedrich Reinhold Kreutzwald completes the Estonian national epic Kalevipoeg, but Russian censorship makes the work impossible to publish.
- November 25 – English poet Alfred Tennyson settles at Farringford House on the Isle of Wight.
- December 27 – Charles Dickens gives the first of his public readings of his own works, in Birmingham Town Hall (England) to the Industrial and Literary Institute, repeated three days later to an audience of working people and including an adaptation of A Christmas Carol; these are very successful and Dickens continues public readings until the year of his death.
- unknown dates
  - Abraham Mapu's historical novel Ahavat Zion ("Love of Zion"), set in ancient Israel and self-published in Kaunas (Lithuania), is the first narrative novel in the Hebrew language.
  - Uriah Maggs establishes what will become the antiquarian bookselling business of Maggs Bros Ltd in London.

== New books ==
=== Fiction ===
- Edward Bradley (as Cuthbert Bede) – The Adventures of Mr. Verdant Green
- Charlotte Brontë – Villette
- William Wells Brown – Clotel; or, The President's Daughter: A Narrative of Slave Life in the United States
- Martha Haines Butt – Antifanaticism: A Tale of the South
- Charles Dickens – Bleak House
- Alexandre Dumas, père – La Comtesse de Charny
- Elizabeth Gaskell
  - Cranford (serialization concludes and book publication)
  - Ruth
- Sarah J. Hale – Liberia; or, Mr. Peyton's Experiments
- Caroline Lee Hentz – Helen and Arthur
- Charles Kingsley – Hypatia
- Sheridan Le Fanu – An Account of Some Strange Disturbances in Aungier Street
- Maria McIntosh – The Lofty and the Lowly, or Good in All and None All Good
- Abraham Mapu – Ahavat Zion
- Herman Melville – "Bartleby, the Scrivener"
- Susanna Moodie – Life in the Clearings
- Gérard de Nerval – Sylvie
- J. W. Page – Uncle Robin, in His Cabin in Virginia, and Tom Without One in Boston
- Charles Reade
  - Christie Johnstone
  - Peg Woffington
- George Sand – Les Maîtres sonneurs
- Elizabeth Sara Sheppard – Charles Auchester
- Robert Smith Surtees – Mr. Sponge's Sporting Tour
- Vidi – Mr. Frank, the Underground Mail-Agent
- George J. Whyte-Melville – Digby Grand
- Charlotte M. Yonge – The Heir of Redclyffe

=== Children and young people ===
- Philip J. Cozans – Little Eva: The Flower of the South
- Fanny Fern – Little Ferns for Fanny's Little Friends

=== Drama ===
- Agha Hasan Amanat – Inder Sabha
- Gustav Freytag – Die Journalisten
- Alexander Ostrovsky – The Poor Bride (Бедная невеста, Bednaya nevesta)
- Charles Reade – Gold
- George Sand – Le Pressoir

=== Poetry ===
- Álvares de Azevedo (died 1852) – Lira dos Vinte Anos
- Matthew Arnold – "The Scholar Gipsy"
- Victor Hugo – Les Châtiments

=== Non-fiction ===
- Manuel Antonio Carreño – Manual de Carreño
- Arthur de Gobineau – An Essay on the Inequality of the Human Races (Essai sur l'inégalité des races humaines), vol. 1
- Judge Edmonds, George Dexter – Spiritualism
- Johann Jakob Herzog – Real-Encyklopädie für protestantische Theologie und Kirche (Encyclopedia of Protestant Theology and Churches) begins publication
- Ferdinand Hoefer (ed.) – Nouvelle Biographie Générale, vol. 1
- George Holyoake – Christianity and Secularism. Report of a Debate between the Rev. Bruin Grant B.A. and George Jacob Holyoake Esq.
- Solomon Northup – Twelve Years a Slave: Narrative of Solomon Northup, citizen of New-York, kidnapped in Washington city in 1841, and rescued in 1853, from a cotton plantation near the Red River in Louisiana
- Karl Rosenkrantz – Aesthetic of Ugliness (Aesthetik des Hässlichen)
- Hippolyte Taine – Essai sur les fables de La Fontaine
- Otto von Böhtlingk – Sanskrit-Wörterbuch (Sanskrit Dictionary) begins publication

== Births ==
- January – Dharmavaram Ramakrishnamacharyulu, Telugu dramatist (died 1912)
- February 22 – Annie Le Porte Diggs, Canadian-born American activist, journalist, author (died 1916)
- April 17 – Mrs. Henry Clarke (Amy Key), English historical novelist and children's writer (died 1908)
- April 23 – Thomas Nelson Page, American writer and lawyer (died 1922)
- April 27 – Jules Lemaître, French dramatist and critic (died 1914)
- May 3 – E. W. Howe (Edgar Watson Howe), American author and editor (died 1937)
- May 14 – Hall Caine, British novelist and playwright (died 1931)
- May 14 – Ella H. Brockway Avann, American educator and writer (died 1899)
- July 27 – Clementina Black, English novelist and political writer (died 1922)
- September 14 – Radu Rosetti, Romanian politician, historical novelist and memoirist (died 1926)
- November 1 – Lie Kim Hok, Dutch East Indian Chinese journalist, novelist, poet and translator (died 1912)

== Deaths ==
- January 26 – Sylvester Judd, American novelist (born 1813)
- February 3 – August Kopisch, German poet (born 1799)
- April 4 – James Scholefield, English classicist (born 1789)
- April 28 – Ludwig Tieck, German poet, novelist and translator (born 1773)
- May 3 – Juan Donoso Cortés, Spanish diplomat and writer (born 1809)
- June 4 – Pavel Katenin, Russian classicist, poet and dramatist (born 1792)
- September 1 – Jacob Bailey Moore, American journalist and historical writer (born 1797)
- September 5 – Georges Depping, German-French historian (born 1784)
- October 29 – Thomas Jonathan Wooler, English satirist (born 1786)
- December 2 – Amelia Opie, English poet and novelist (born 1769)

== Awards ==
- Newdigate Prize – Samuel Harvey Reynolds, "The Ruins of Egyptian Thebes"
