= Andrei Pop =

American art historian

Andrei Octavian Pop
- Born: Bucharest, Romania
- Education: Stanford University, Harvard University
- Known for: Art History, Aesthetics, History of Ideas

Academic background
- Doctoral advisor: Ewa Lajer-Burcharth

Andrei Pop is the Allan and Jean Frumkin Professor in the Committee on Social Thought at the University of Chicago.

== Life and education ==
Pop was born under the Nicolae Ceaușescu regime in Bucharest, Romania where he attended primary school. He moved to Los Angeles shortly after the Romanian Revolution of 1989, when his parents were admitted into the graduate program in mathematics at the University of Southern California. Pop graduated from Van Nuys High School, and received a B.A. in Art History with a minor in Computer Science from Stanford University and his PhD in art history from Harvard University, where he was an Ashford Fellow and received a Derek Bok Teaching Prize. Prior to completing his dissertation, Pop received a 2008-10 Samuel H. Kress Fellowship at the Center for Advanced Study in the Visual Arts at the National Gallery of Art, Washington D.C. After teaching at the Institut für Kunstgeschichte at the University of Vienna and Kunsthistorisches Seminar at the University of Basel, he joined the Committee on Social Thought at the University of Chicago in 2015.

== Research ==
Pop's early research concerned European neoclassical art of the late eighteenth and early nineteenth centuries as "the aesthetic branch of the Enlightenment." His first book focused on Henry Fuseli (born Heinrich Füßli, 1741-1825), a Swiss artist working in London after a long interval in Rome, who embodied both the era's interest in local cultures and literatures and its cosmopolitanism. Pop called this combination of preoccupations, which adopted a detached relativist view of culture open to feminist, anticolonial, and liberal politics, "neopaganism", in contrast to the invocation of Roman purity typical of Fuseli's contemporary Jacques-Louis David, and the neoclassicism of the French Revolution. This work has implications for the history of modern theatre (which became more interested in performing ancient forms of theatre like Greek tragedy) and modern understandings of the mind, in particular, of subjectivity, sympathy, and the privacy of experience.

Pop's second project, completed after his arrival at the University of Chicago, explores the relations between the privacy of conscious experience and the publicity of meaning and of truth, showing how they were central to the art and science of the late nineteenth century. In the resulting book, A Forest of Symbols, the fin de siècle art movement called symbolism, and the use of new symbolic notations in period science, logic and mathematics are brought together in their opposition to psychologism and the skeptical undermining of truth it occasioned. Close attention to the doctrines about language and pictures of the mathematician and founder of analytical philosophy Gottlob Frege is "novel and therefore deserves special attention." The definition of symbolism as an investigation of the means of meaning-making also makes possible a new account of the period focused on neglected artists and logicians, many of them women, as well as neglected works by canonical figures like Edgar Allan Poe, Édouard Manet and Stéphane Mallarmé, and the history of color, perspective and photography. The overall perspective argued for is a kind of reformed Platonism, whose logical structures are accessed by sensuous beings attentive to historical context. It's perhaps appropriate, given this tendency, that the book has been published in Greek by Crete University Press.

== Other scholarly activities ==
Early in his graduate education, Pop was fascinated by the aesthetic theory of ugliness, which he encountered on returning to Bucharest in the Romanian translation of Karl Rosenkranz's Aesthetics of Ugliness (1853), then unavailable in English. With Mechtild Widrich, he completed a translation and critical edition of this classic of nineteenth-century aesthetics and art criticism, as well as editing a collection of essays and sources on ugliness historical and contemporary. The preoccupation with social and aesthetic dimensions of ugliness, inflected by Fuseli's classicism, in turn informs his recent studies of race, slavery, and cultural politics in romantic era-art, in the work of Henry Fuseli, Jean-Jacques Rousseau, Joshua Reynolds, and Francisco Goya. His interests in cultural translation, classicism, and the psychology of art have also led to invitations to discuss the work of living artists, like Virginio Ferrari (artist), the London-based performance art trio JocJonJosch, and Paola Pivi, as well as public humanities issues like pandemic literature, in Science+Fiction: Reflections on Pandemics with Lorraine Daston and Elisabeth Bronfen for the Goethe-Institut, and historic preservation and minoritarian aesthetics in Louis Sullivan's demolished skyscraper housing a German-language Schiller Theater, for the gallery Wrightwood 659 in Chicago. Alongside this work, for most of the 2010s, Pop served as commissioning editor for book reviews in art theory and historiography for the College Art Association's online organ, caa.reviews.

== Publications ==
=== Books ===
- Andrei Pop, How to Do Things with Pictures. A Guide to Writing in Art History, Harvard College, 2008.
- Andrei Pop, Antiquity, Theatre, and the Painting of Henry Fuseli, Oxford University Press, 2015.
- Andrei Pop, A Forest of Symbols: Art, Science and Truth in the Long Nineteenth Century, Zone Books, 2019.
- Andrei Pop, Translation and ed. of Karl Rosenkranz, Aesthetics of Ugliness (1853), with Mechtild Widrich, London: Bloomsbury, 2015.
- Andrei Pop, ed. Ugliness: The Non-Beautiful in Art and Theory, London: Tauris, 2014.

=== Articles ===
- Andrei Pop, The Importance of Being Oroonoko: An Art-Historical Morality Play, The Art Bulletin, Vol.103, No.4 (December 2021).
- Andrei Pop, Enlightenment as Thought Made Public: Joshua Reynolds’s Portrait of a Black Man, Journal 18, No.12 (Fall 2021): “The ‘Long’ EighteenthCentury?”, ed. Sarah Betzer and Dipti Khera.
- Andrei Pop, Ennemis de l’Absolu? Mirbeau, Rodin, et Le Jardin des supplices, 2019. Cahiers Octave Mirbeau, Vol.26 (March 2019), pp. 122–137.
- Andrei Pop, Goya and the Paradox of Tolerance, Critical Inquiry, Vol.44, No.2, 2018.
- Andrei Pop, Henry Fuseli: Greek Tragedy and Cultural Pluralism. The Art Bulletin, Vol. 94, No. 1 (March 2012), pp. 78–98.
