= Měčín =

- Town
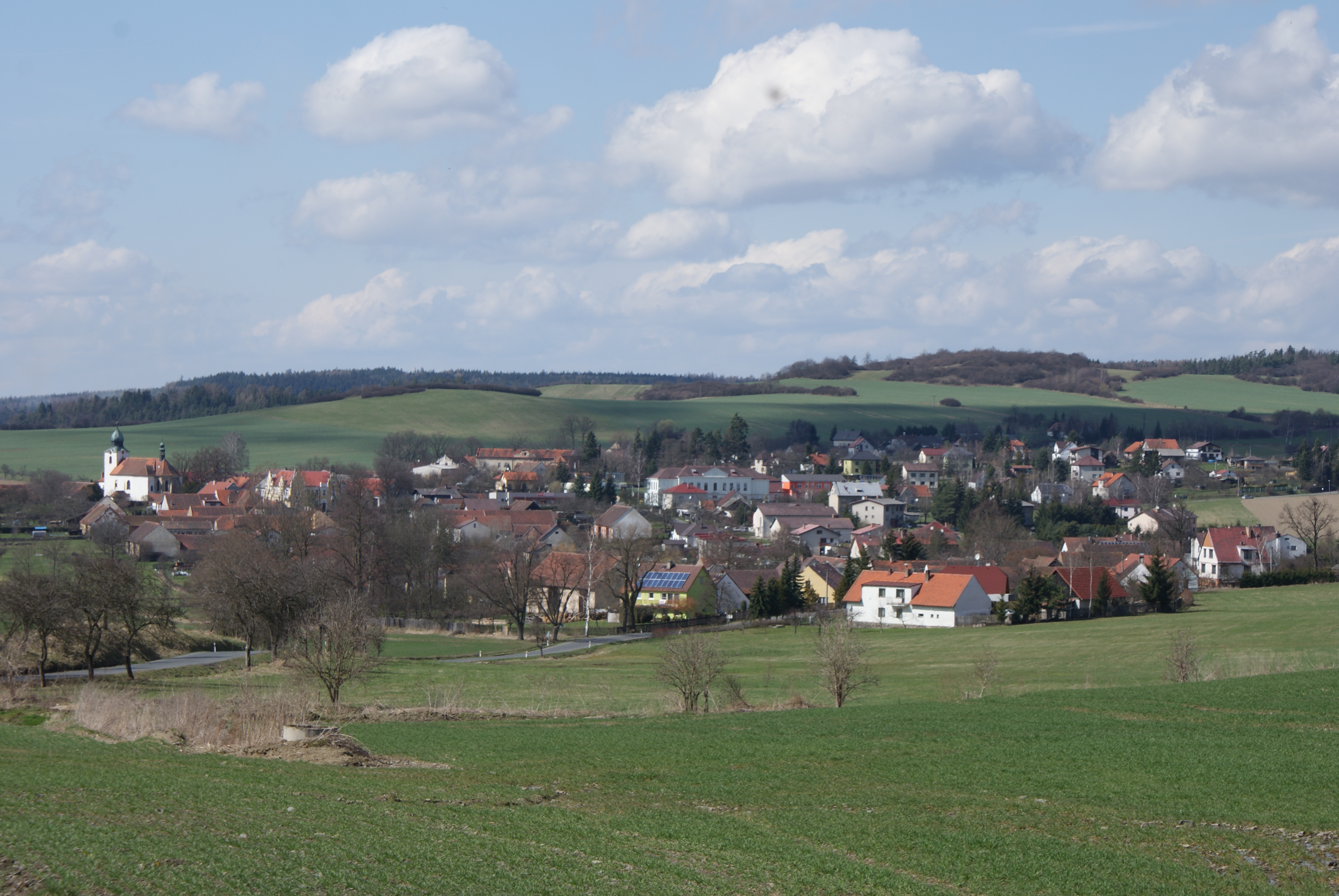
- View from the southeast

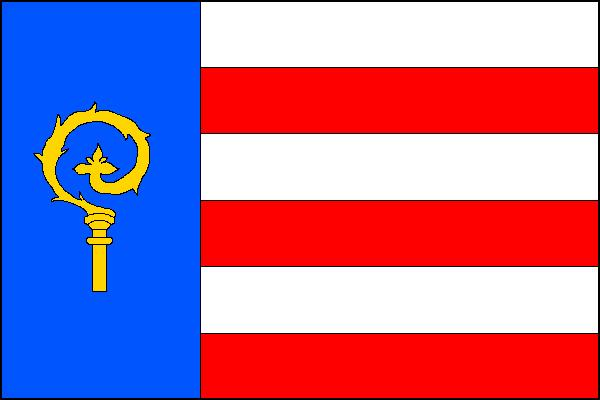
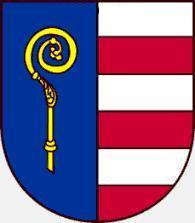
- Flag Coat of arms

- Location in the Czech Republic
- Coordinates: 49°29′2″N 13°24′34″E
- Country: Czech Republic
- Region: Plzeň
- District: Klatovy
- First mentioned: 1352

Government
  - Mayor: Stanislav Skala

Area
  - Total: 38.91 km^{2} (15.02 sq mi)
- Elevation: 475 m (1,558 ft)

Population (2026-01-01)
  - Total: 1,120
  - Density: 28.8/km^{2} (74.6/sq mi)
- Time zone: UTC+1 (CET)
  - Summer (DST): UTC+2 (CEST)
- Postal code: 335 01, 340 12
- Website: www.mecin.cz

Měčín (Czech pronunciation: [ˈmɲɛtʃiːn]; German: Metschin) is a town in Klatovy District in the Plzeň Region of the Czech Republic. It has about 1,100 inhabitants.

== Administrative division ==
Měčín consists of nine municipal parts (in brackets population according to the 2021 census):

- Měčín (587)
- Bíluky (80)
- Hráz (21)
- Nedanice (61)
- Nedaničky (25)
- Osobovy (40)
- Petrovice (155)
- Radkovice (104)
- Třebýcina (39)

== Etymology ==
The name Měčín was derived from the female personal name Meče, which arose from the Germanic name Metze (an abbreviation of Mechthild). The settlement was probably once owned by someone with that name.

== Geography ==
Měčín is located about 12 km (7 mi) northeast of Klatovy and 28 km (17 mi) south of Plzeň. The municipal territory lies mostly in the Švihov Highlands, but it also extends into the Blatná Uplands in the southeast. The highest point is the hill Chlumec at 616 m (2,021 ft) above sea level.

== History ==
The first written mention of Měčín is from 1352. From 1413, it was a market town. In the 14th century, it was part of the Švihov estate. In the 15th century, Měčín formed a separate estate, but in the 16th century it again belonged to Švihov. In 1610–1653, it was part of the Žinkovy estate, and then it belonged to the estates of Roupov and Červené Poříčí. From 1746 until the establishment of an independent municipality in 1848, it belonged to Žinkovy.

== Demographics ==
Historical population

Year	Pop.	±%
1869	2,801	—
1880	2,907	+3.8%
1890	2,696	−7.3%
1900	2,713	+0.6%
1910	2,793	+2.9%

Year	Pop.	±%
1921	2,738	−2.0%
1930	2,442	−10.8%
1950	1,845	−24.4%
1961	1,681	−8.9%
1970	1,449	−13.8%

Year	Pop.	±%
1980	1,300	−10.3%
1991	1,154	−11.2%
2001	1,125	−2.5%
2011	1,104	−1.9%
2021	1,112	+0.7%

Source: Censuses

== Transport ==
There are no railways or major roads passing through the municipal territory.

== Sights ==
The main landmark of Měčín is the Church of Saint Nicholas. It is originally a late Gothic church from the third quarter of the 14th century, which was gradually rebuilt in the Baroque style in 1726 and 1776–1777.
