= Ballade à la grosse Margot =

- Author: François Villon
- Genre: Pornography, Poetry
- Publication date: 15th century
- Publication place: France

The Ballade à la grosse Margot (in English : the Ballad of the big Margot) is a 15th-century ballad written by François Villon in Le Testament. From its publication, it became one of the most popular and striking passages of his work. It was likely composed before Le Testament and included in it when Villon wrote the collection.

This ballad depicts Margot in a pornographic scene, presenting her as a sex worker with the narrator acting as her pimp. Described as being of large build, Margot overpowers him with her weight, making him her victim.

Both the character and the ballad are considered examples of Villon's subversion of courtly love poetry and the moral standards of his time. Margot and the ballad are more broadly viewed as heralding modernity compared to the Middle Ages. Despite its innovative aspects, including the representation of women in art, the ballad remains heavily marked by misogyny. It has influenced art across many disciplines and left a lasting impact on other artists, such as Charles Baudelaire and Bertolt Brecht.

== Contents ==
The poet begins with a loving passage addressed to Margot, which contrasts sharply with the rest of the ballad and suggests that Villon likely composed the piece before Le Testament:

Original	English Translation
Item, à la grosse Margot, Très doulce face et pourtraicture, Foy que doy Brelare Bigod, Assez devote creature. Je l’ayme de propre nature, Et elle moy, la doulce sade. Qui la trouvera d’adventure, Qu’on luy lise ceste Ballade.	Item, to big Margot, With a very sweet face and demeanor, By the faith I owe to Brelare Bigod, A sufficiently devout creature. I love her naturally, And she loves me, sweet and simple. Whoever comes across her by chance, Let them read her this Ballad.

In any case, Villon does not give the ballad to Margot directly but instead requests that it be read to her, likely after his death. Villon conceives the ballad as a theatrical piece, with each stanza serving as an act: the first depicts the reception of a client, the second deals with the management of the brothel's activities, and the third represents the sexual act with Margot. The first act focuses on complicity, the second on conflict, and the third on reconciliation.

Margot's name is deliberately chosen by Villon for its pejorative connotation, meaning "magpie, a talkative woman of dubious morals". She is portrayed as a sex worker, while Villon casts himself in the role of her pimp. Described as being of large build, she towers over him; Villon imagines himself naked with her as she "overpowers" him and then farts on him. Villon incorporates a Latin expression in one of the verses.

From its publication, it became one of the most popular and well-known parts of Villon's work and one of the most commented on, notably because of its explicit nature. It seems certain that the character of Margot does not actually exist, especially since the discovery of a Parisian inn named "La Grosse Margot", with Villon seemingly playing with the sign of the place. The text contains numerous erotic and bawdy references that are not visible at first reading.

== Analysis ==
Villon expresses significant misogyny through this ballad. However, the poet overturns many traditional values with this character and poem. In addition to depicting a pornographic scene that legitimizes prostitution and composing a love song for a sex worker, elevating her to the status of nobility typically receiving love poems, it is possible that she is portrayed as pregnant during the sexual act, which was particularly frowned upon in the society Villon inhabited:

Original	English Translation
Et, au reveil, quand le ventre luy bruyt, Monte sur moy, que ne gaste son fruit.	And, upon waking, when her belly grumbles, She climbs on me, so as not to harm her fruit.

More subtly, Villon contrasts Margot with Mary from the Ballade pour prier Notre Dame, thereby subverting the Christian values also promoted in his work—the sex worker replaces the Virgin. For Janis L. Pallister, what stands out more than the sexual nature of the ballad is Villon's contrast between "the very vulgar and the elevated". The ballad also exemplifies Villon's "presentation of reality", where the author portrays the world "as he perceives it, raw". Ezra Pound describes this approach as follows:

It means the statement of facts. It presents. It does not comment. It is as communicative as Nature. It is as uncommunicative as Nature. It washes its hands of theories.

He also positions himself as the hero, whose idyllic dwelling has now become a brothel. Margot allows him to glorify "filth" in the literal sense, as she farts on him in a sort of scatological narrative. She is also a particularly significant symbolic figure for Villon, who seems to associate her with the figure of his own mother.

The nudity of Margot and Villon is one of the moments in Villon's works where the image of nudity appears as a "fundamental stripping of the human being" and a "return to animality". In the ballad, the author also critiques the "power of money that corrupts their relationship", with the brothel serving as a miniature metaphor for a world where the wealthy can purchase bodies.

Rouben Cholakian describes the author's play on the symbolism of Margot's name as follows:

In other cases, the humor is not of a sexual nature but simply rests on the play with the objectifying homograph: ‘Item, to Chaplain I leave / My chapel with a simple tonsure’ (1836–37). In both cases, the humor is never entirely innocent. The verbal play does not, however, distract from a careful reading of the ‘acute anxiety that the poet veils beneath humor, irony, and bawdiness.’ A parallel manifestation of this same phenomenon is the tendency to transform ‘signs’ in the streets into signs within textual discourse
[...]
The most illustrious example of this practice appears in La Grosse Margot (1583). Is he addressing the woman or the sign of the tavern that bears her name? Is he offering the tavern to the tavern, the sign returned to the sign? Signifier and signified, text and event become inextricably linked, while the testator seems to reify the woman and humanize the place. Through this commutation of ‘signs,’ the testator reveals the need for distance that the poem expresses.

At the end of the poem, Villon reifies himself alongside Margot, merging their two reifications:

Original	English Translation
Lequel vault mieux, chascun bien s’entresuit. L’ung l’autre vault : c’est à mau chat mau rat.	Which is worth more? Each complements the other. One equals the other: it’s a case of a bad cat and a bad rat.

The poem also seems to reflect a new form of moral relativism unique to Villon in these two lines, which echo other questions posed in Le Testament. These questions aim to challenge the moral and virtuous ranks assigned to his characters. Additionally, critics have noted the acrostic elements in certain parts of the poem, particularly Villon signing his name in its feminine form, VILLONE, at the beginning of the lines in the Envoi. Roger Dragonetti describes the final lines of the ballad by highlighting the harmony that emerges:

Similarly, Villon's name, regenerated by the Virgin Mother and also found fragmented as an acrostic in the Ballade de la Grosse Margot, seems to exist only to exorcise, in a sort of monstrous union, the satanic fantasy of the maternal womb of creation. Indeed, it must be understood that the entire ending of the ballad (the third stanza and Envoi) transfigures filth or abjection into an effect of harmony. This harmony resembles, if not redemption, at least a kind of accord whose rhythm integrates, within a 'pacified' space, the noise of the name of shame: ‘Then peace is made, and she lets out a big fart at me’ (1611).

== Legacy ==
In the 1489 edition, Margot was depicted standing and holding a flower. Shortly after Villon's death, the ballad was mentioned in the collections of Jean II de Bourbon.

The ballad played a significant role in the aesthetic of ugliness developed by Baudelaire and is also revisited by Algernon Swinburne, who interpreted it as a deeply Sadean poem. James Joyce and Oliver St. John Gogarty influenced each other through discussions about it. Bertolt Brecht adapted the poem for theater. Additionally, Sigitas Geda composed two poems dedicated to Margot.
