= Sarah Ann Myers =

- Born: 1800; Wilmington
- Died: December 11, 1876; Carlisle
- Occupation: Writer

Sarah Ann Irwin Myers (1800 – December 11, 1876) was an American author.

She was born Sarah Ann Irwin was born in 1800 in Wilmington, Delaware. She was educated at Bethlehem Female Seminary. In 1825, she married Dr. Theodore Myers. Upon his death, she was forced to support herself and Sarah J. Hale encouraged her to become a writer. Most of her many works were written for children. She also worked as a teacher of music and art. She became a member of the Pennsylvania Academy of Fine Arts.

Sarah Ann Myers died on 11 December 1876 in Carlisle, Pennsylvania.

== Bibliography ==
- Fitz Harold. New York: 1853.
- Sequel to The Neighbors' Children, From the German. Lindsay & Blakiston, 1854.
- Aunt Carrie's Budget. Philadelphia, 1859.
- Faithful Nicolette; or the French Nurse. London: 1859.
- Watch—Work—Wait:; or the Orphan's Victory. London: 1859.
  - also published as Watch—Work—Wait: A Story of the Battle of Life. 1 vol. Edinburgh: Nelson and Sons, 1876.
- Self-Sacrifice; or, The Pioneers of Fuegia. 1861.
- Poor Nicholas. 1863.
- The Gulf Stream. 1864.
- The Young Recruit. 1864.
- The Hero of Falcon's Island or The little boy who would be Robinson Crusoe. 1867.
- Margaret Gordon. 1869.
- The Little Shoemaker: Or, the Orphan's Victory.
- The Railroad Boy.
