= Ayit Tzavua =

1858 novel by Abraham Mapu

עיט צבוע
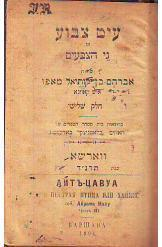
- Author: Abraham Mapu
- Language: Hebrew
- Publication date: 1858
- Media type: Print

Ayit Tzavua (Hebrew: עיט צבוע), literally The Painted Eagle, or The Hypocrite is an 1858 Hebrew novel by Abraham Mapu. The novel is partly set in the salon of a Lithuanian magnate, in which enlightened Poles and Jews meet and discuss Voltaire, philosophy and the Jews. It is one of the first modern novels in Hebrew, following the same author's Ahavat Zion (1853).
