= 873 Mechthild =

Main-belt asteroid

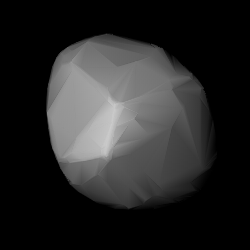
- Modelled shape of Mechthild from its lightcurve

Discovery
- Discovered by: M. F. Wolf
- Discovery site: Heidelberg Obs.
- Discovery date: 21 May 1917

Designations
- Named after: unknown
- Alternative designations: A917 KJ · 1917 CA
- Minor planet category: main-belt · (middle); background

Orbital characteristics
- Epoch 31 May 2020 (JD 2459000.5)
- Uncertainty parameter 0
- Observation arc: 102.24 yr (37,343 d)
- Aphelion: 3.0199 AU
- Perihelion: 2.2346 AU
- Semi-major axis: 2.6273 AU
- Eccentricity: 0.1495
- Orbital period (sidereal): 4.26 yr (1,555 d)
- Mean anomaly: 48.264°
- Mean motion: 0° 13^{m} 53.04^{s} / day
- Inclination: 5.2763°
- Longitude of ascending node: 150.00°
- Argument of perihelion: 109.99°

Physical characteristics
- Mean diameter: 29.04±1.9 km; 33.56±0.59 km; 34.471±0.103 km
- Synodic rotation period: 11.006±0.001 h
- Pole ecliptic latitude: (249.0°, −52.0°) (λ_{1}/β_{1}); (51.0°, −61.0°) (λ_{2}/β_{2})
- Geometric albedo: 0.040±0.004; 0.041±0.002; 0.0531±0.008
- Spectral type: Tholen = PC; C0 (Barucci); B–V = 0.684±0.022; U–B = 0.319±0.037
- Absolute magnitude (H): 11.4

873 Mechthild (prov. designation: A917 KJ or 1917 CA) is a dark background asteroid from the central regions of the asteroid belt. It was discovered by German astronomer Max Wolf at the Heidelberg Observatory on 21 May 1917. The primitive P-type asteroid has a rotation period of 11.0 hours and measures approximately 34 kilometers (21 miles) in diameter. The origin of the asteroid's name remains unknown.

== Orbit and classification ==
Mechthild is a non-family asteroid of the main belt's background population when applying the hierarchical clustering method to its proper orbital elements. It orbits the Sun in the central asteroid belt at a distance of 2.2–3.0 AU once every 4 years and 3 months (1,555 days; semi-major axis of 2.63 AU). Its orbit has an eccentricity of 0.15 and an inclination of 5° with respect to the ecliptic. The body's observation arc begins with its first and official discovery observation at Heidelberg Observatory on 21 May 1917.

== Naming ==
This minor planet is named "Mechthild", a German feminine given name. Any reference of this name to a specific person or occurrence is unknown.

=== Unknown meaning ===
Among the many thousands of named minor planets, Mechthild is one of 120 asteroids, for which no official naming citation has been published. All of these low-numbered asteroids have numbers between 164 Eva and 1514 Ricouxa and were discovered between 1876 and the 1930s, predominantly by astronomers Auguste Charlois, Johann Palisa, Max Wolf and Karl Reinmuth.

== Physical characteristics ==
In the Tholen classification, Mechthild is closest to a very dark, primitive P-type, and somewhat similar to a common C-type asteroid. In the taxonomy by Barucci, it is a C0-type. P-type asteroids are more common in the outer asteroid belt and among the Jupiter trojan population.

=== Rotation period ===
In May 2015, a rotational lightcurve of Mechthild was obtained from photometric observations by Brian Warner at his Palmer Divide Observatory (716) in Colorado. Lightcurve analysis gave a rotation period of 11.006±0.001 hours with a brightness amplitude of 0.27±0.02 magnitude (U=3).

Alternative period determinations were made by Claes-Ingvar Lagerkvist (10.6 h) in March 1976, by astronomers at the Palomar Transient Factory (11.007±0.0069 h) in January 2014, and by the Spanish group of asteroid observers, OBAS (10.99±0.01 h) in May 2015 (U=2/2/3). In 2016, a modeled lightcurve gave a concurring sidereal period of 11.00639±0.00005 hours using data from a large collaboration of individual observers (such as above). The study also determined two spin axes of (249.0°, −52.0°) and (51.0°, −61.0°) in ecliptic coordinates (λ, β).

=== Diameter and albedo ===
According to the surveys carried out by the Infrared Astronomical Satellite IRAS, and the Japanese Akari satellite, and the NEOWISE mission of NASA's Wide-field Infrared Survey Explorer (WISE), Mechthild measures (29.04±1.9), (33.56±0.59) and (34.471±0.103) kilometers in diameter and its surface has an albedo of (0.0531±0.008), (0.041±0.002) and (0.040±0.004), respectively. The Collaborative Asteroid Lightcurve Link adopts the results from IRAS, that is, an albedo of 0.0531 and a diameter of 29.04 kilometers based on an absolute magnitude of 11.49. Alternative mean-diameter measurements published by the WISE team include (29.124±10.26 km) and (36.327±0.290 km) with corresponding albedos of (0.0785±0.0687) and (0.0339±0.0063).
