= Mechtild Widrich =

Austrian-American art historian

- Born: Salzburg, Austria
- Education: University of Vienna, Massachusetts Institute of Technology
- Known for: Art and Architectural History and Art Theory
- Awards: Fulbright Fellowship, Max Planck Society, Berlin, Institute for Advanced Study University of Notre Dame, Swiss National Science Foundation, Charlotte W. Newcombe Fellowship, NTU Centre for Contemporary Art Singapore, VALIE EXPORT Center

Mechtild Widrich is an Austrian-American art historian, curator, and Professor as well as Department Chair at the School of the Art Institute of Chicago.

== Academic career and leadership ==
Educated at University of Vienna, the Free University Berlin (M.Phil. Art History, University of Vienna) and the MIT School of Architecture and Planning (PhD History, Theory, and Criticism of Art and Architecture), Widrich has taught art and architectural history at the University of Vienna, the ETH Zürich, the University of Zürich, the Academy of Fine Arts Vienna, the Eikones Summer School at University of Basel and the University of Applied Arts Vienna.

While writing her master thesis on Nancy Spero, Widrich suggested the permanent installation Remembrance/Renewal to the Jewish Museum Vienna. Spero worked with archival footage and art works from the museum's collection and transferred images onto the wall with her custom rubber stamp method. The installation, co-curated with Werner Hanak, was unveiled in February 1996, and is still housed in the atrium of the museum.

Widrich also worked at the Kunsthalle Wien and the Dia Center for the Arts in New York early in her career. From 1999-2003, she was the project coordinator of the EU-Projekt Vektor. European Contemporary Art Archives headed by basis wien. The goal was to theorize and standardize decentralized contemporary art archives across Europe.

While pursuing her PhD at MIT from 2003-2009, she organized the film series "Pictures of the Cold War" in collaboration with Harvard University and, together with Daniel Birnbaum, curated the exhibition Sounding the Subject at the MIT List Visual Arts Center, which opened in October 2007. During a postdoctoral curatorial position at the National Gallery in Washington D.C. (2009–10), Widrich co-curated (with Arpad Kovacs and Akili Tommasino) the exhibition There is Nothing to See Here in the National Gallery's Modern Lab. The works, ranging from Vija Celmins's reductive realism to Glenn Ligon's text-based works, verged on invisibility or immateriality and asked for close looking and attention.

After a junior faculty position at ETH Zurich (2011–13), she was a senior research fellow at the Eikones Center for the Theory and History of the Image at University of Basel from 2013 to 2015. In 2014, Widrich was appointed Professor of Contemporary Art History at the University of Vienna, and also in the Art History, Theory, and Criticism department of the School of the Art Institute of Chicago, where she started teaching in fall 2015. Widrich has held Visiting Professorships at the University of Applied Arts (2022), Vienna, and the University of Chicago (2023), and is the 2026 Chillida Chair Visiting Professor at Goethe University Frankfurt am Main.

Connecting her scholarship on public monuments to civic policy, Widrich serves on Chicago's Grant Park Advisory Council on Art, Monuments, and Markers and sits on the Board of Directors of the American Friends of the Vienna Museums. She has also been an Affiliate Scholar at the Nanovic Institute for European Studies at the University of Notre Dame since 2023. Widrich is part of the Academic Advisory Board of the Jewish Museum Vienna, and has served on expert committees, for example for the recontextualization of the monument to Karl Lueger in Vienna (2022), as well as for the WWII Bunker in Stuttgart Feuerbach (2024–25).

Widrich lectures internationally, and has organized numerous conferences and symposia: in 2015, together with Martino Stierli, Widrich organized the two-part symposium "Going Global. The Art-Education-Speculation Complex" at the School of the Art Institute and the Museum of Modern Art, New York on the occasion of the inaugural Chicago Architecture Biennial. Widrich's three-part symposium Down with Monuments. On Making and Unmaking of Public Memory took place in 2017 and 2018 in Chicago (in collaboration with the University of Chicago) and at the US Pavilion in Venice, presenting historical and global perspectives on monuments, citizenship, and space. In 2026, "From Decommissioned Statues to Gardens of Heroes", at the College Art Association looked at the deliberate construction of sites as nationalist commemorative spaces. Widrich also serves in various capacities on international expert committees: she is currently editor-in-chief of caa.reviews and member of the caa board of publications, member of the scientific committee of Cadernos de Arte Pública, Future Anterior, Vesper. Journal for Architecture, Arts and Theory, Život umjetnosti and, from 2019 to 2022, served as reviews editor and board member of Art Journal.

== Research ==
Widrich works on monuments, architecture, and performance in public space. In her book Performative Monuments, Widrich coins the title phrase, 'performative monument', to explain why live body art influenced interactive memorials since the 1980s, building on the definition of anti-authoritarian countermonuments proposed by German artist Jochen Gerz, and the speech-act theory of British philosopher J. L. Austin. The concept has been taken up in recent literature on commemoration and public art, and by artists, notably Doris Salcedo. Her book Monumental Cares. Sites of History and Contemporary Art, 2023, was a finalist for the "most influential book on the art of the present (ASAP book prize)", and was reviewed as "a provocative volume that is academically rigorous, and it will enrich the public debate on commemoration with its sophisticated reflections on notions of temporality and authenticity of historical markers, siting, and public participation, at a moment when monuments have been at the forefront of political activism."

In the field of performance studies, Widrich is known for her work on Viennese Actionism, VALIE EXPORT and Marina Abramovic, with particular focus on the documentation and mediation of events, repetition, and the layering of diverse audiences over time.

Widrich also works on aesthetic theory, in particular ugliness. Together with art historian Andrei Pop, she is the co-editor and co-translator of the first book-length philosophical treatment of the topic, Karl Rosenkranz's 1853 Aesthetics of Ugliness, and co-editor of the book Ugliness. The Non-Beautiful in Art and Theory.

== Books ==
- Monumental Cares. Sites of History and Contemporary Art. Manchester University Press 2023.
- Participation in Art and Architecture. London: Tauris, 2016 / Bloomsbury, 2022.
- Presence: A Conversation at Cabaret Voltaire. Berlin: Sternberg Press, 2016.
- Translation and ed. of Karl Rosenkranz, Aesthetics of Ugliness (1853), London: Bloomsbury, 2015.
- Performative Monuments: The Rematerialisation of Public Art. Manchester University Press 2014.
- Ugliness: The Non-Beautiful in Art and Theory. London: Tauris, 2013 / Bloomsbury, 2016.
- Krzysztof Wodiczko, City of Refuge: A 9-11 Memorial. London: Black Dog, 2009.
- Leopoldstadt: die Andere Heimatkunde. Vienna: Brandstätter, 1999.

== Scholarly Essays ==
=== On Contemporary Monuments and Commemoration ===
- Mechtild Widrich, “Once Again and No More. Yael Bartana's Orphan Merry-go-round and Contemporary Commemoration," in Child Emigration from Frankfurt am Main, ed. by the City of Frankfurt / Museum of History, Frankfurt, 2021.
- Mechtild Widrich, “Performative Materials and Activist Commemoration”, Cadernos de Arte Pública (December 2020).
- Mechtild Widrich, –“¿Cómo hacer democráticos nuestros monumentos?” ARK Magazine (September 2020).
- Mechtild Widrich, “Monumentos, Experiencia y Memoria”, La Semana (September 2020).
- Mechtild Widrich, “After the Counter-monument: Commemoration in the Expanded Field”, in Swati Chattopadhyay and Jeremy White, eds., The Routledge Companion to Critical Approaches to Contemporary Architecture (London/New York: Routledge, 2019).
- Mechtild Widrich, “Moving Monuments in the Age of Social Media”, Future Anterior Vol.15, No.2 (Winter 2018).
- Mechtild Widrich, “Natur-Gewalt. Jonas Dahlbergs Entwurf für das 07/22 Mahnmal in Norwegen”, in Texte zur Kunst, No. 95 (September 2014).
- Mechtild Widrich, “The Willed and the Unwilled Monument. Judenplatz Vienna and Riegl’s Denkmalpflege”, Journal of the Society of Architectural Historians (JSAH), (September 2013).
- Mechtild Widrich, “Spatial Implications of the Monument to Freedom and Unity in Leipzig”, Log, No.27 (Spring 2013).

=== On Performance and its Mediation ===
- Mechtild Widrich, “The fourth wall turns pensive”, in The Feminist Avantgarde, Exhibition Catalogue (New York: Prestel, 2015).
- Mechtild Widrich, “VALIE EXPORT. Body Cinema”, The Feminist Avantgarde, Exhibition Catalogue,(New York: Prestel, 2015).
- Mechtild Widrich, “Stein und Diagramm: Fragen der Materialität in VALIE EXPORTs Körperkonfigurationen”, Zeitschrift für Geschlechterforschung und Visuelle Kultur, No.57 (October 2014).
- Mechtild Widrich, “The Informative Public of Performance: A Study of Viennese Actionism, 1965-1970”, TDR. The Drama Review, No. 217 (February 2013).
- Mechtild Widrich, “Process and Authority: Marina Abramović’s Freeing the Horizon and Documentarity”, Grey Room, No.47 (May 2012).
- Mechtild Widrich, “Several Outbreaks of Valie Export’s Genital Panic”, in Hilde van Gelder, Helen Weestgeest, eds., Photography between Poetics and Politics (Leuven: UP Leuven, 2008).

=== On Architecture ===
- Mechtild Widrich, “Das Haus denkt an die Gegenwart. Zum Erweiterungsbau des Kunstmuseums Basel von Christ&Gantenbein”, in Kunstmuseum Basel (Ostfildern: Hatje/Cantz, 2016).
- Mechtild Widrich, “The Naked Museum: Art, Urbanism, and Global Positioning in Singapore”, Art Journal (Summer 2016).
- Mechtild Widrich, “The Ultimate Erotic Act. On the Performative in Architecture,” in Participation in Art and Architecture, London: Tauris, 2016 / Bloomsbury, 2022.

== Curating ==
There is Nothing to See Here, 2010, Modern Lab, National Gallery of Art, Washington, D.C.

Sounding the Subject, 2007, List Visual Arts Center, MIT, co-curated with Daniel Birnbaum.

Remembrance/Renewal ("Installation der Erinnerung"), 1995, permanent installation by Nancy Spero at the Jewish Museum Vienna.
