= Mechthild =

Mechthild is a female Germanic given name. It is an old form of the first name Matilda and means "powerful in combat, powerful fighter".

Variants include Mechthilde, Mechthildis, Mechtild, Mechtilde or Mechtildis.

== Mononym ==
- Mechtildis of Edelstetten (c. 1125–1160), abbess of Edelstetten, saint
- Mechthild of Schwarzburg-Käfernburg (d. 1192), countess of Holstein
- Mechthild of Giessen (c. 1155 – c. 1203), countess of Giessen
- Mechthild I of Wohldenberg (d. 1223), German abbess
- Mechthild of Andechs (d. 1254), German abbess, beatified
- Mechthild of Baden (d. 1258), countess of Württemberg
- Mechthild of Bienburg (c. 1223 – c. 1265), abbess of Buchau Abbey
- Mechtild of Wunnenberg (d. 1268), German abbess
- Mechthild of Magdeburg (1207– c. 1282), medieval German mystic
- Mechthild of Holstein (1220/1225–1288), wife of Danish king Abel
- Mechthild of Sayn (c. 1203 – c. 1291), wife of Henry III, Count of Sayn
- Mechthild of Hackeborn (1241–1299), Cistercian and Christian mystic, saint
- Mechthild of Cleves (d. 1309), duchess of Cleves
- Mechthild II of Wohldenberg (d. 1316), German abbess
- Mechtild of Nassau (d. 1323), duchess of Bavaria
- Mechtildis of Bongard (fl. 1352–1356), German abbess
- Mechtild of Guelders (d. 1384), duchess of Guelders
- Mechthild II of Anhalt (1392–1463), German abbess
- Mechthild of the Palatinate (1418–1482), princess and literary patron
- Mechthild of Hesse (1473–1505), duchess of Cleves
- Mechthild of Hesse (1490–1558), countess of Tecklenburg-Schwerin
- Mechthild of Bavaria (1532–1565), German noblewoman
- Mechtilde of the Blessed Sacrament (1614–1698), French nun

== First name ==
=== Mechthild ===
- Mechthild Albert (d. 1956), German romanist
- Mechthild Bach (b. 1963), German soprano
- Mechthild Bach (physician) (1949–2011), German internist
- Mechthild Curtius (d. 1939), German writer
- Mechthild Dehn (d. 1941), German pedagogue
- Mechthild Flury-Lemberg (d. 1929), Swiss textile restorer
- Mechthild Georg, German operatic mezzo-soprano
- Mechthild Großmann (born 1948), German actress and dancer
- Mechthild Heil (born 1961), German politician
- Mechthild Leutner (d. 1948), German sinologist
- Mechthild Motsch von Freydorf (1906–1997), German painter
- Mechthild Podzeit-Lütjen (d. 1955), Austrian writer
- Mechthild Rawert (born 1957), German politician
- Mechthild Ross-Luttmann (d. 1958), German politician
- Mechthild Sarrazin (1920–2014), German sculptor and painter
- Mechthild Roswitha Scheurl von Defersdorf (d. 1952), German linguist
- Mechthild Thürmer (d. 1958), German nun
- Mechthild Wiswe (1938–2017), German historian and folklorist
- Mechthildis of Austria (1891–1966), Habsburg princess

=== Mechthilde ===
- Mechthilde Wittmann (b. 1967), German lawyer and politician

=== Mechthildis ===
- Mechthildis Thein (1888–1959), German stage and film actress

=== Mechtild ===
- Mechtild Böger (d. 1960), German visual artist
- Mechtild Borrmann (b. 1960), German writer
- Mechtild Erpenbeck (d. 1955), German psychologist
- Mechtild Frisch (d. 1943), German painter
- Mechtild Hagemann (d. 1961), German badminton player
- Mechtild Jansen (d. 1952), German social scientist
- Mechtild Oechsle (1951–2018), German sociologist
- Mechtild Rössler (b. 1959), German feminist geographer
- Mechtild Rothe (b. 1947), German politician
- Mechtild Sandberg-Ciletti, German translator
- Mechtild Schröder (1932–2010), German physician
- Mechtild Widrich, Austrian art historian

=== Mechtilde ===
- Mechtilde Lichnowsky (1879–1958), German author

=== Mechtildis ===
- Mechtildis Sinsteden (1782–1881), German philanthropist

== See also ==
- 873 Mechthild, main-belt asteroid
