= Nedanice =

- Village
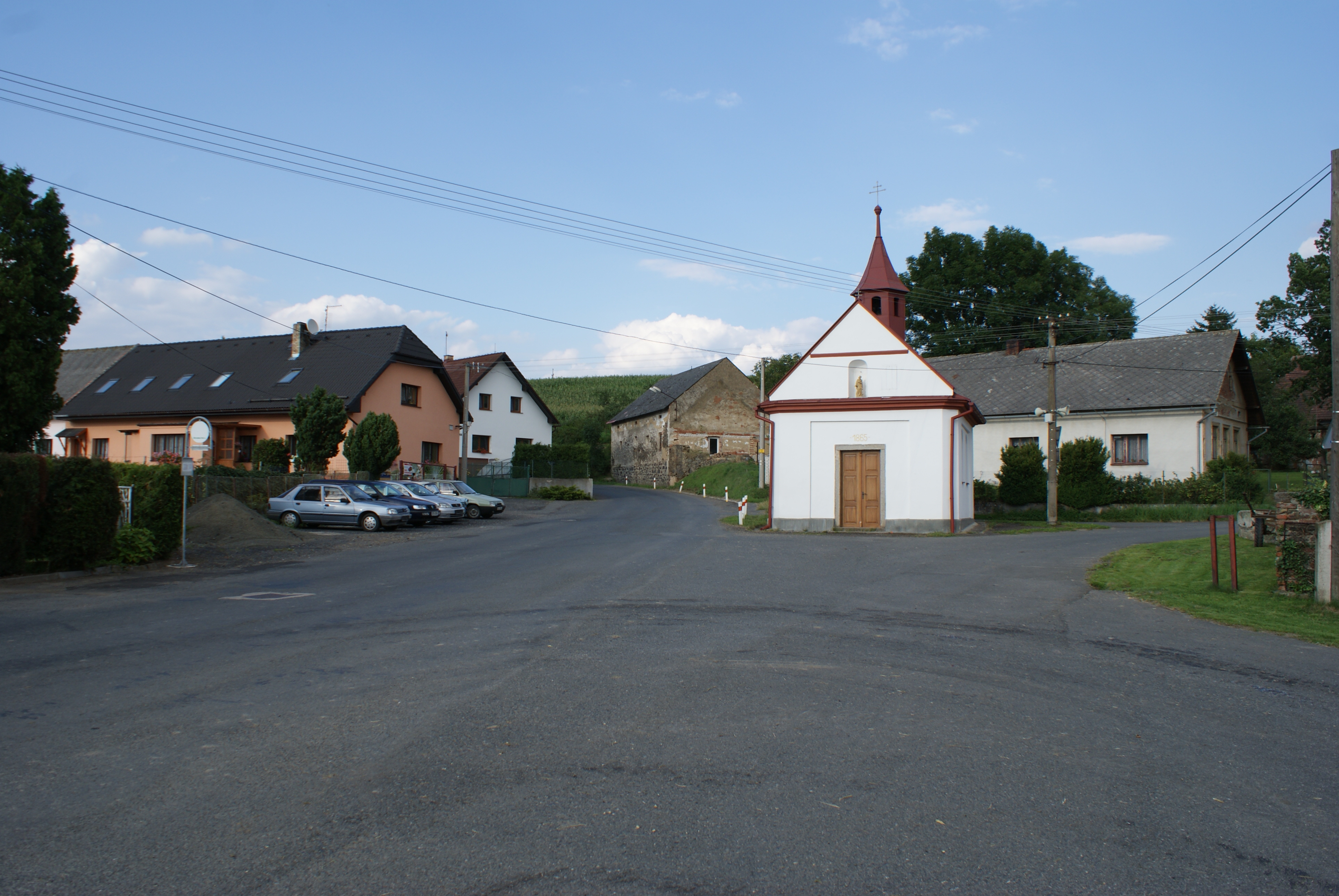
- Centre of Nedanice

- Location in the Czech Republic
- Coordinates: 49°28′3″N 13°23′8″E
- Country: Czech Republic
- Region: Plzeň
- District: Klatovy
- Municipality: Měčín
- First mentioned: 1368

Area
  - Total: 4.25 km^{2} (1.64 sq mi)

Population (2021)
  - Total: 61
  - Density: 14/km^{2} (37/sq mi)
- Time zone: UTC+1 (CET)
  - Summer (DST): UTC+2 (CEST)
- Postal code: 340 12

Nedanice is a village and administrative part of Měčín in Klatovy District in the Plzeň Region of the Czech Republic. It has about 60 inhabitants.

== History ==
The first written mention of Nedanice is from 1368.

== Transport ==
It is located on the road of second category II/117.

== Gallery ==
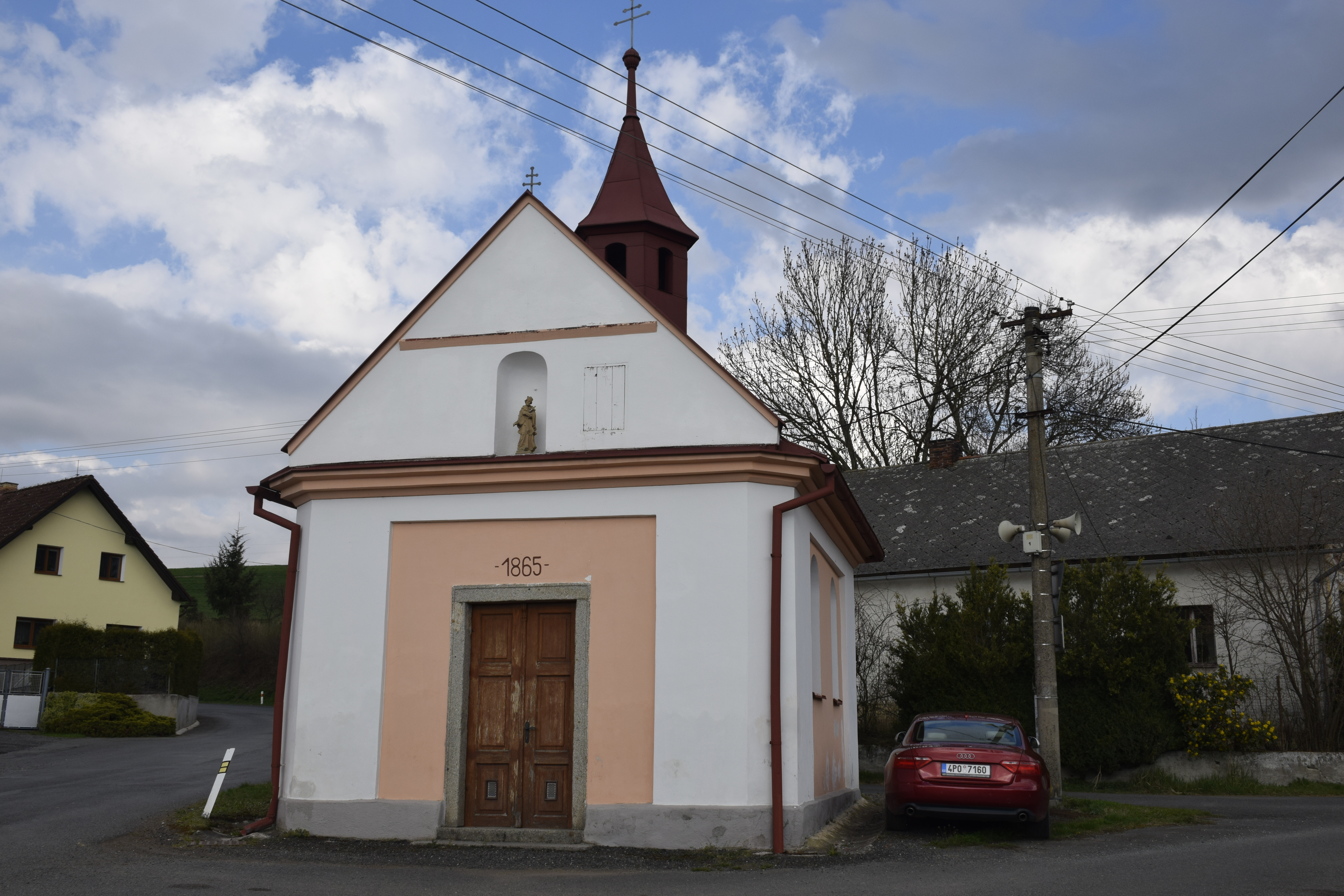
Chapel of Saint John of Nepomuk

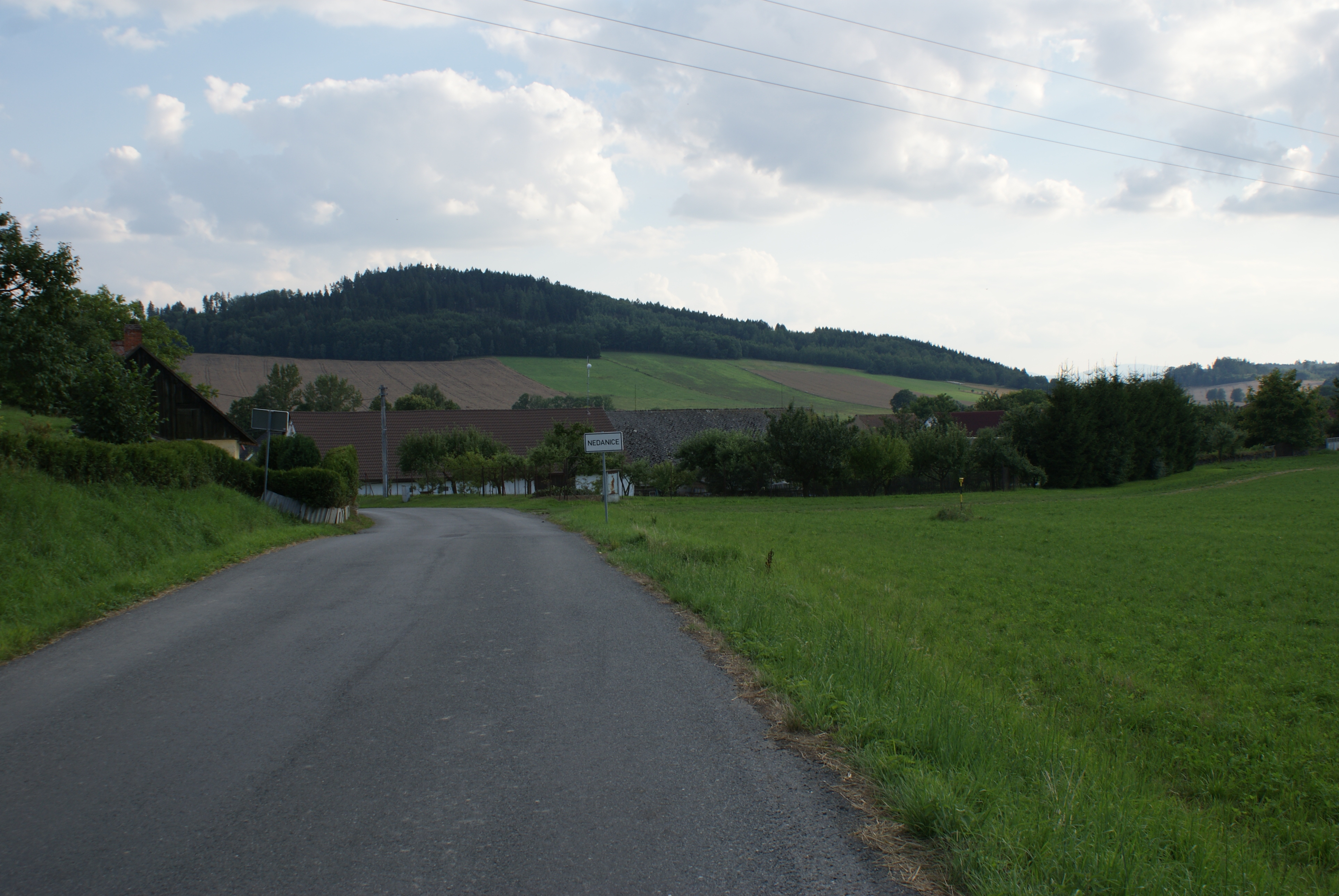
Entrance to Nedanice
