= White Acre vs. Black Acre =

1856 novel by William M. Burwell

White Acre vs. Black Acre: A Case at Law; Reported by J. G., ESQ., a retired barrister, of Lincolnshire, England
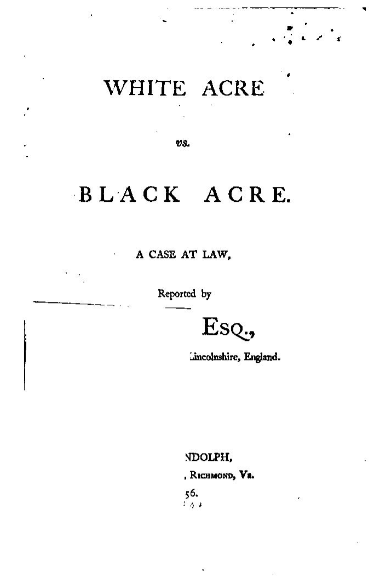
- Title page for White Acre vs. Black Acre: A Case at Law (1856)
- Author: William M. Burwell
- Language: English
- Genre: Plantation literature Satire
- Publisher: J.W. Randolph Publishers
- Publication date: 1856
- Publication place: United States
- Media type: Print (hardback & paperback) & E-book
- Pages: 251

White Acre vs. Black Acre is an 1856 plantation fiction novel written by William M. Burwell.

== Overview ==
White Acre vs. Black Acre is one of several pro-slavery novels published in the Southern United States in response to Uncle Tom's Cabin by Harriet Beecher Stowe, published in 1852.

Burwell's novel, however, departs from the usual outline of most anti-Tom novels, which often narrated stories of loyal slaves serving benign plantation owners who were disturbed by troublesome abolitionists. Instead, Burwell's novel acts as an allegory for the history of slavery in the United States, in a manner similar to George Orwell's Animal Farm, which acts as an allegory for the history of the Soviet Union.

== Plot ==
The story follows the history of the United States from its time as a British province to the beginning of tensions between North and South in the 1850s. It is presented as though the story were being recounted by a retired barrister from Lincolnshire in England to a reporter from the United States.

The story takes place in the county of Shropshire in England, where capitalist Mr. Bull is undergoing a difficult transaction with a large quantity of land his firm has since acquired from various lucrative business deals. His main rival is Don Armado, who owns land near his own, and seeks to steal Bull's land from him.

When Don Armado is placated, Mr. Bull takes his business elsewhere, and the land prospers. However, the two farmers tilling the land are suddenly split over the question of whether the land ought to be tilled by ordinary, ineffective farmhands or by loyal, hardworking slaves.

The land is thus split between the two farmers. The pro-slavery segment becomes the Black Acre Farm, whilst the anti-slavery land becomes the White Acre Farm, with both competing to see which side will be the most prosperous.

== Allegories ==
- Broadview is an English gentleman, and the main protagonist of the novel who attempts to heal the breach between the White and Black Acres. Broadview represents the readers of the story, acting as an outside influence to the ongoing conflict between the two farms.
- The White Acre Farm is one-half of the original land owned by Mr. Bull, which is tended to by a handful of farmhands incapable of harvesting the produce. The White Acre symbolizes the Northern United States before (and later during) the American Civil War.
- The Black Acre Farm is one-half of Mr. Bull's land that is tended to by loyal, hardworking slaves who are able to farm the land easily due to their effort and numbers. The Black Acre symbolises the Southern United States and the later Confederate States of America.
- Mr. Bull is a portly, ageing businessman who is overwrought by his excessive workload, and is unable to make deals effectively without additional assistance due to his age. He represents Great Britain and the British Empire as a whole, with his name and appearance being derived from John Bull.
- Don Armado is a minor character who is referenced frequently as a part-associate, part-adversary of Mr. Bull who uses slaves for harvesting sugar and mining gold. His title of Don and the references to gold suggest that Don Armado represents the early Spanish Empire that colonised the Americas during the Renaissance, before the arrival of the British in the 17th century.

== Publication history ==
The novel was released in book form in 1856, and was printed by the same publishers of an earlier anti-Tom novel, Uncle Robin, in His Cabin in Virginia, and Tom Without One in Boston by J.W. Page (1853).

== See also ==
- Mr. Frank, the Underground Mail-Agent – Another satirical anti-Tom novel, released in 1853
