= Mr. Frank, the Underground Mail-Agent =

1853 novel

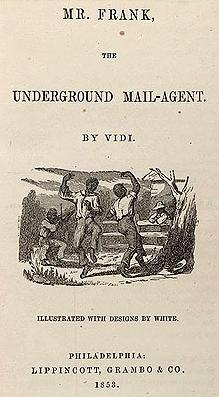
- Title-page from the first edition
- Author: Anonymous (credited as "Vidi")
- Language: English
- Genre: Parody; Plantation literature
- Publisher: Lippincott, Grambo & Co
- Publication date: 1853
- Publication place: United States
- Media type: Print (hardcover & paperback) & e-book
- Pages: c. 238 pp (May change depending on the publisher and the size of the text)

Mr. Frank, the Underground Mail-Agent is an 1853 parody novel written by an unknown author credited as "Vidi".

== Background ==
Mr. Frank is an example of the pro-slavery plantation literature genre that emerged from the Southern United States in response to the abolitionist novel Uncle Tom's Cabin in 1852, which was criticised in the South for its negative portrayal of plantation life.

However, whereas the majority of such anti-Tom novels were direct attacks on Uncle Tom's Cabin, Mr. Frank instead chooses to parody the events of Stowe's novel rather than serve as an antithesis to her work.

== Plot introduction ==
The novel centres on Mr. Frank, a kindhearted but empty-headed worker for the Underground Railroad, where he works to help runaway slaves from the South flee to the Northern United States and then onto Canada. Originally, Mr. Frank is an abolitionist at heart, but comes to believe that slavery is a necessary evil, for while it is wrong, the slaves themselves are better off under their Southern masters than they are in the North.

As time passes, Mr. Frank also learns of the corruption within the Underground Railroad itself, discovering that the abolitionists he works with are nothing more than hopeful slaveowners, convincing slaves from the South to run away from their original masters with promises of freedom, only to be enslaved once more.

== Influences ==
It has been noted by researchers from the University of Virginia that the writing-style of Mr. Frank bears some similarity to the works of the English satirist Henry Fielding, famed for his satirical novel Shamela, released in 1742 as a parody of the 1740 novel Pamela by Samuel Richardson.

It has been argued that Mr. Frank may be attempting to imitate Shamela by parodying Uncle Tom's Cabin, although this remains open to debate.

== Authorship ==
Almost all editions of Mr. Frank identify the author as simply Vidi (Latin for "I saw", as in the famous Veni, vidi, vici speech made by Julius Caesar). The identity of Vidi remains unknown, although it has been suggested by the sarcastic remarks made in Mr. Frank towards female readers that Vidi may have been male. It may also be the case that James Whitcomb Riley, the author of the poem "Little Orphant Annie", made veiled references to the people behind the book.

== Publication history ==
Lippincott, Grambo & Co. originally released the novel under the original title of The Underground Mail-Agent. For unknown reasons, this same edition was released with a second title-page giving the full title of Mr. Frank, the Underground Mail-Agent.

The publishers Lippincott, Grambo & Co. had been responsible for the release of the critically successful Aunt Phillis's Cabin in 1852, and also released Antifanaticism: A Tale of the South – another anti-Tom novel – in the same year as Mr. Frank.

== See also ==
- Shamela – A 1742 parody novel by Henry Fielding
- White Acre vs. Black Acre – Another satirical anti-Tom novel, released in 1856
