= Liberia; or, Mr. Peyton's Experiments =

Book by Sarah Josepha Hale

- Title page for Liberia; or, Mr. Peyton's Experiments (1853)
- Author: Sarah Josepha Hale (as Sara J. Hale)
- Language: English
- Genre: Plantation literature
- Publisher: Harper & Brothers of New York
- Publication date: 1853
- Publication place: United States
- Media type: Print (Hardcover & Paperback) & E-book
- Pages: c. 300 pp (May change depending on the publisher and the size of the text)

Liberia; or, Mr. Peyton's Experiments is an 1853 novel by Sarah Josepha Hale, the author of the nursery rhyme "Mary Had a Little Lamb", who wrote the novel under the name of Sara J. Hale.

== Background ==
Liberia falls under the category of plantation literature, a literary genre that emerged in the Southern United States in response to Uncle Tom's Cabin, which was criticized as inaccurately depicting slaveholding in the south.

However, whilst the majority of such works attempted to defend slavery as an institution, Liberia argues that freed slaves cannot live prosperous lives anywhere but their native homes in Africa.

== Plot ==
The story follows Mr. Peyton, the eponymous slaveowner who wishes to free all the slaves on his plantation. However, before he can do so, Peyton wishes to make certain that the slaves in his charge will be happy in their new-found freedom and so decides to conduct three separate "experiments" to test this.

In turn, Peyton sends his slaves to a farm in the Southern United States, an industrial town in the Northern United States, and finally to Canada. In all three cases, the slaves end up being even worse off than they had been under slavery, having been bullied by white supremacists who occupy all three places and dislike the presence of colored people.

However, a despairing Peyton is approached by members of the American Colonization Society, who convince Peyton to send his slaves to their native home in Liberia, where they can be happy and free. Peyton and the slaves agree, and the freed slaves in Peyton's charge are sent back to Africa, where they can finally prosper and be free from discrimination.

== Publication history ==
Liberia was first published in novelised form by Harper & Brothers of New York City in 1853.

== Relations to other works ==
Liberia shares some parallels to the 1852 anti-Tom novel Frank Freeman's Barber Shop by Baynard Rush Hall, which also featured a slave being sent to Liberia by the American Colonization Society after leading a miserable life in the Northern United States.
