= Manual de Carreño =

1853 etiquette manual

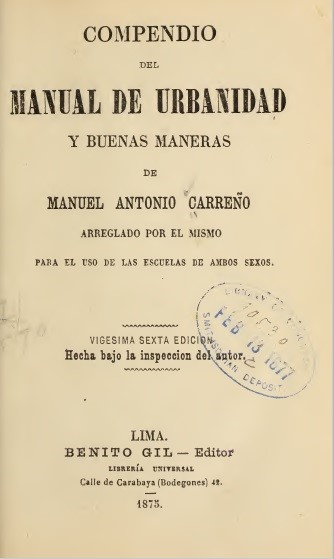
Cover of the 1875 edition.

The Manual de Urbanidad y Buenas Maneras (Spanish: Manual of Urbanity and Good Manners), commonly known as the Manual de Carreño (Spanish: Carreño's Manual), it is a manual of etiquette written by Venezuelan author Manuel Antonio Carreño and first published in 1853. The work contains lessons and advice on how people should behave in public and private settings, such as the home, the family, school, and the workplace.

The book has been reprinted and adapted numerous times and has given rise to expressions such as "you have to consult Carreño" when addressing issues of personal and professional conduct. This manual was so important and well-known that it has been mentioned in several novels, such as in Laura Esquivel’s novel Like Water for Chocolate.

== Background ==
In the 19th century, most of the etiquette guides were based on French and English editions. Their lessons could be applied in most countries because they dealt with places and situations considered common, such as at home, on the street, at a dance, with the family.

In Mexico, they were mainly used by people from the middle and upper classes. Each manual is aimed either at different audiences based on gender, age (children or adults), or at the general public.

The manuals were used both at home and in some schools. Most were based on Christian morality. They emphasized self-control and encouraged habits such as helping those in need and values such as humility.

They reached their peak in the early 20th century. Today, many of these manuals have been preserved, having been passed down from generation to generation. In the case of the Carreño Manual, it is still in print, and although it is no longer commonly consulted, some of its rules are still followed, like respecting one’s parents, washing up before leaving the house, walking on the sidewalk, and greeting others.

== Structure ==
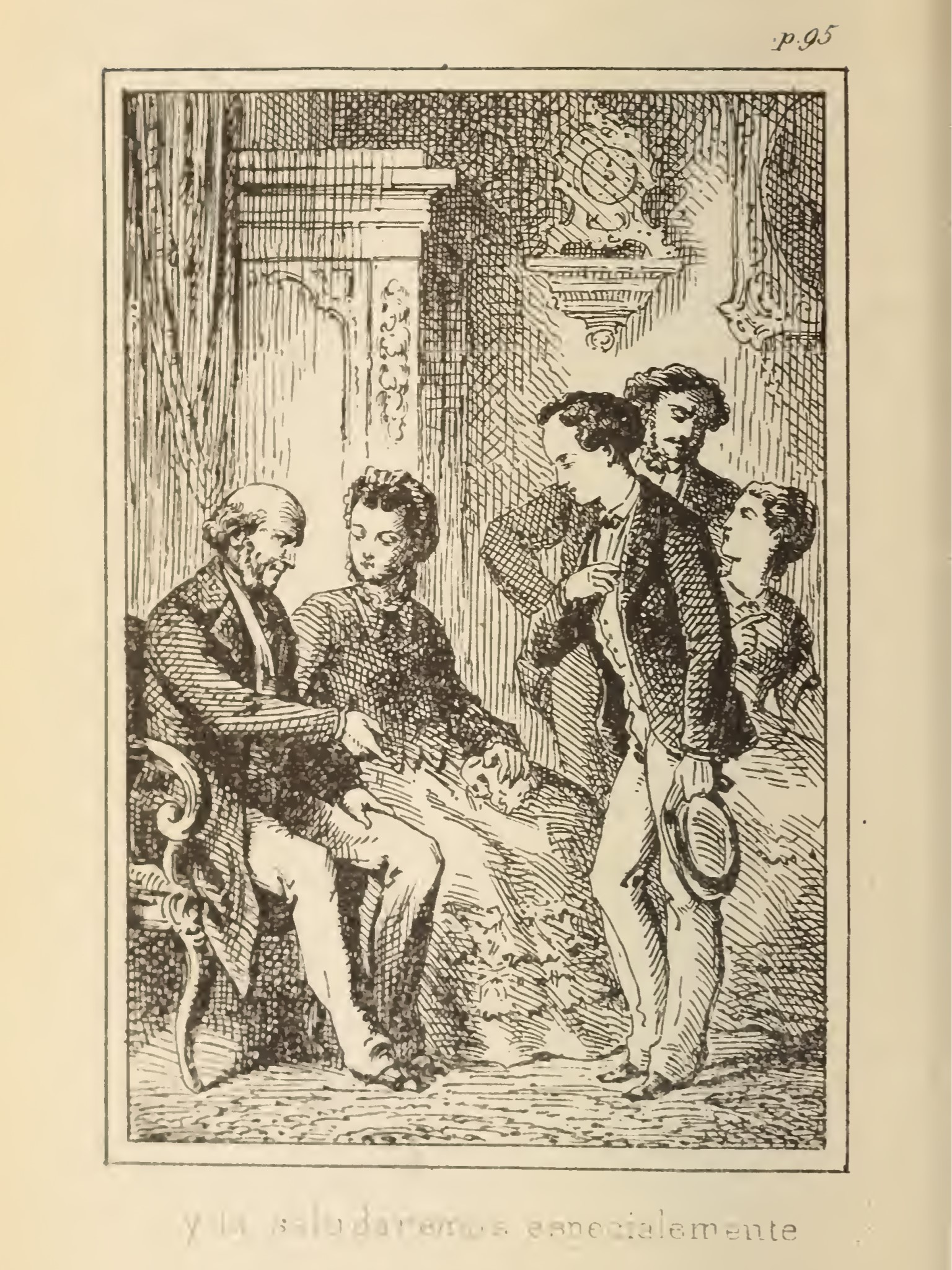
Illustration in the manual for greeting.

The manual is divided into Moral Duties of Man and Etiquette. Each section contains chapters that outline lessons applicable to different situations and settings. It also includes subsections that introduce and organize the chapter's content. This structure makes the manual easier to read, as it allows readers to look up specific information—such as table manners—when needed. It was not necessary to read the entire manual; rather, by consulting the index, the reader could find what they needed under Etiquette. At the beginning of each chapter and subchapter, the rationale for that rule is explained, and the section concludes with the presentation of the norms. Some editions of the manual include illustrations that depict the norm or suggest an appropriate body posture for the situation, such as the posture for praying.

=== Chapters from the 1865 edition ===
- Man's Moral Duties
- Duties toward God.
- Duties toward society: parents, country, and our fellow human beings.
- Duties toward ourselves.

=== Etiquette rules ===
- Chapter 1: General Principles.
- Chapter 2: Personal Hygiene: personal cleanliness, clothing, the home, and consideration for others.
- Chapter 3: At Home: Dressing, Getting Up, Interacting with Family and Neighbors.
- Chapter 4: Outside the Home: The Street, the Church, and Educational Institutions.
- Chapter 5: In Society: Conversations, Visits, Mealtimes, and Information to Be Treated with Care.
- Chapter 6: Applications of Good Manners

== Bibliography ==
- Carreño, Manuel Antonio, Compendio del manual de urbanidad y buenas maneras, México, s/d, 1875.
- Carreño, Manuel Antonio (1859). D. Appleton y Cía. (ed.). Manual de urbanidad y buenas maneras para uso de la juventud de ambos sexos (in Spanish). Nueva York.
- García, Gretel, y Torrijos, Eduardo, Manual de Carreño para niños,México, Quarzo, 2006. (Available online)
- Torres Septién, Valentina, "Literatura para el "buen comportamiento" los manuales de urbanidad y buenas maneras en el siglo XIX," en Belém Clark de Lara y Elisa Speckman Guerra (edición), en La República de las letras asomos a la cultura escrita del México decimonónico, México, UNAM, 2005, v. 2, pp. 313 - 328 (ida y regreso al siglo XIX).
