= Abraham Mapu =

Lithuanian Hebrew novelist (1808–1867)

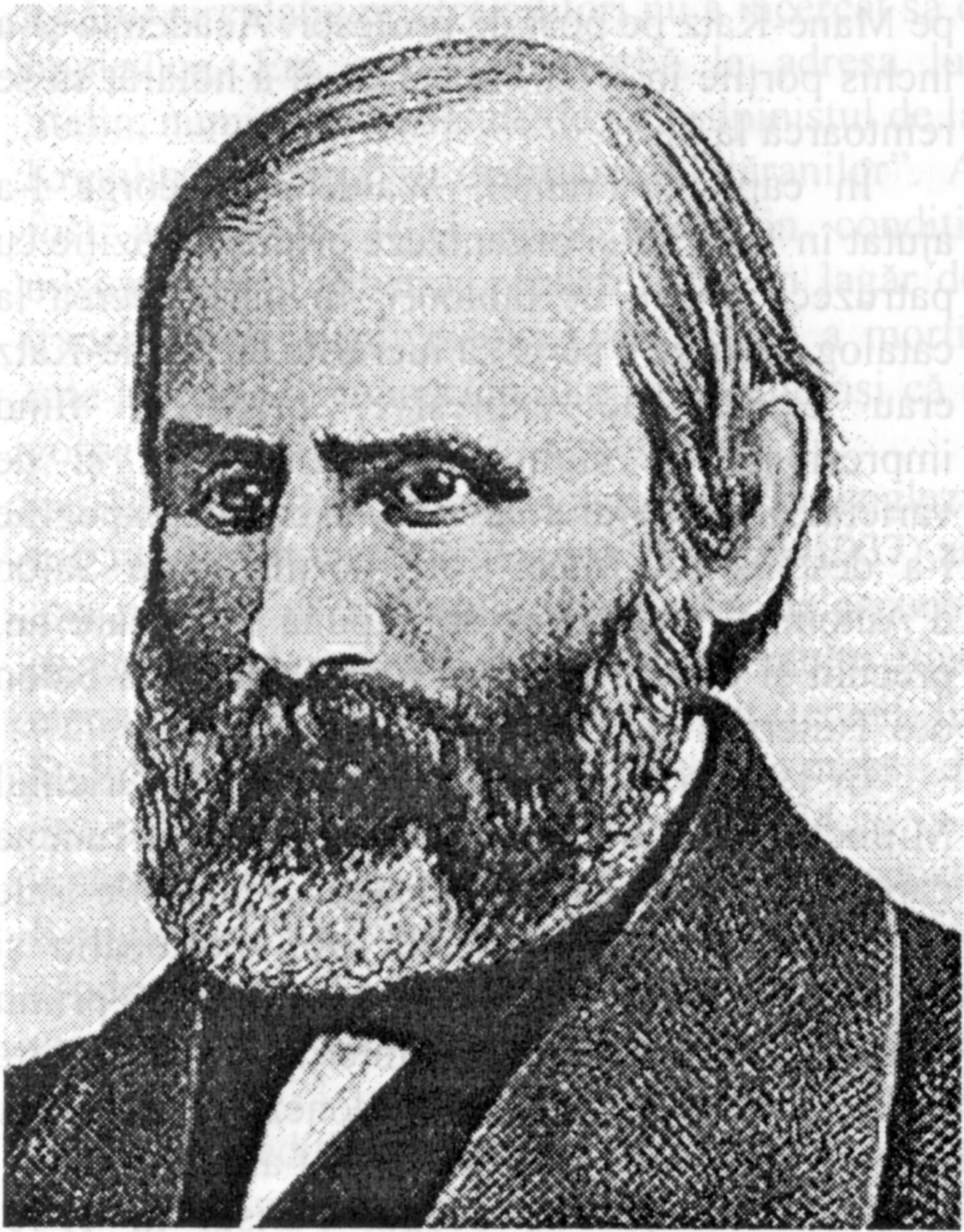
Abraham Mapu

Abraham Mapu (Lithuanian: Abraomas Mapu; 1808 in Vilijampolė, Kaunas – 1867 in Königsberg, Prussia) was a Lithuanian novelist. He wrote in Hebrew as part of the Haskalah (enlightenment) movement. His novels depict biblical settings featuring themes of heroism, adventure, and romantic love. Some scholars have argued that they influenced early Zionist thought.

== Biography ==
Born into a Jewish family, as a child Mapu studied in a cheder where his father served as a teacher. He married in 1825.

For many years he worked as a travelling schoolteacher and lived in modest financial circumstances. Mapu gained financial security when he was appointed teacher in a government school for Jewish children. He worked as a teacher in various towns and cities, joined the Haskalah movement, and studied German, French and Russian. He also studied Latin from a translation of the Bible to that language, given to him by his local rabbi.

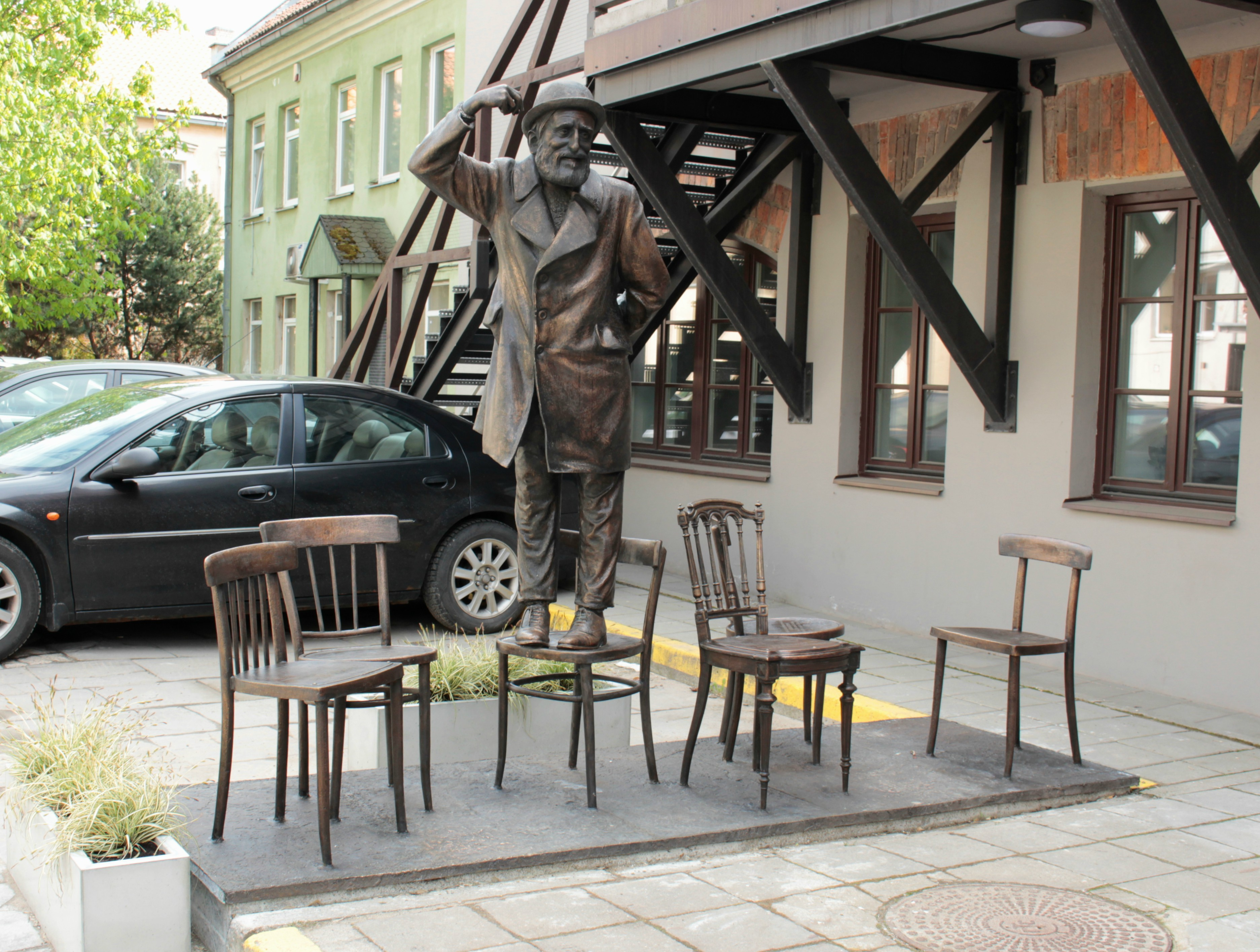
Statue of Abraham Mapu in Kaunas

He returned in 1848 to Kaunas and self-published his first historical novel, Ahavat Zion. Scholars have described it as one of the earliest Hebrew novels. He began work on it in 1830 but completed it only in 1853. Unable to fully subsist on his book sales, he relied on the support of his brother, Matisyahu. In 1867 he moved to Königsberg due to illness, published his last book, Amon Pedagogue (Amon means something like Mentor), and died there.

=== Ahavat Tsion (The Love of Zion) – 1853 ===
Ahavat Tsion (1853) is a biblical novel by the Jewish writer Avraham Mapu. It is the first novel written in modern Hebrew, set during the time of the prophet Isaiah and King Hezekiah, and written in biblical-style Hebrew influenced by Romantic literary conventions. The novel emphasizes themes of the Land of Israel, love, youth, labor, national revival, morality, and biblical-era Israel. The novel had a significant impact on the emerging Zionist movement and modern Hebrew literature.

Mapu began writing the novel at the age of 22, in 1830. It was first published in 1853 and was widely read and discussed among Jewish communities in the mid-19th century. The novel was read by young Jews familiar with biblical Hebrew of the Land of Israel as a fertile region filled with springs, fields, and vineyards, and it strengthened their desire to leave the diaspora and “ascend” to the land.

Mapu’s prolonged writing process was driven by his interest in reviving Hebrew as a literary language, his aim of producing a major literary work, and his efforts to refine the work over many years. He often left the streets of Kovno (Kaunas) to climb the hill of Aleksotas, where he would gaze over the city and the Neman River, imagining biblical Jerusalem.

The novel contrasts characters portrayed as virtuous with those depicted negatively. Mapu gives positive names (Tamar, Yedidya, Yoram) to virtuous characters, while villains receive names with negative connotations or associated with evil biblical figures (Achan, Nabal, Halah, Zimri). One exception is Amnon, a positive character despite sharing a name with the biblical rapist; Mapu chose the name to evoke the rabbinic phrase “the love of Amnon and Tamar,” symbolizing redeemed love.

The story takes place in the Kingdom of Judah during the reigns of Ahaz and Hezekiah. The central historical event depicted is the Assyrian campaign of Sennacherib. Mapu describes Jerusalem under siege and the internal conflict between activists led by Hezekiah and Isaiah—who refuse to yield to the threats of Rabshakeh—and defeatists led by Shebna the scribe, who advocate surrender.

The novel was published in more than forty Hebrew editions and translated into German, English, Yiddish, Russian, French, Ladino, Arabic, and Judeo-Persian. In Israel, it was republished by Yizreel Publishing with an introduction by Yaakov Fichman. In 1947, the Habima Theater staged a theatrical adaptation of Ahavat Tsion.

== Evaluation ==
Mapu is considered to be the first Hebrew novelist. Influenced by French Romanticism, he wrote intricately plotted stories about life in ancient Israel, which he contrasted with 19th-century Jewish life. His style is fresh and poetic, almost Biblical in its simple grandeur.

== Legacy ==
The romantic-nationalistic ideas in his novels later inspired David Ben-Gurion and others active in the leadership of the modern Zionist movement that led to the establishment of the state of Israel. The American Hebrew poet, Gabriel Preil, references Mapu in one of his works and focuses on the two writers' native Lithuania.

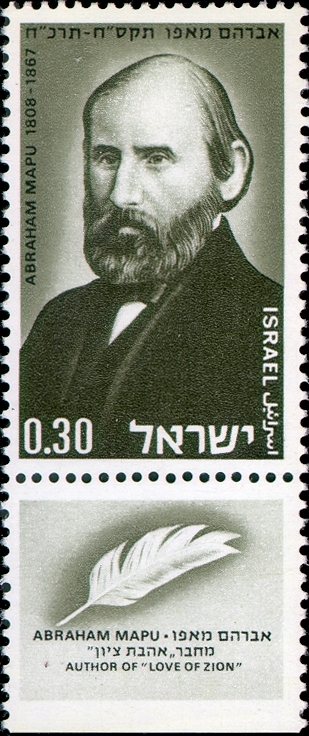
Israeli postal stamp, 1968

== Novels ==
- Ahavat Zion (1853) (Amnon, Prince and Peasant, translated by F. Jaffe, 1887); (In the Days of Isaiah, translated by B.A.M. Schapiro, 1902 and republished in 1922 and 1930 as The Shepherd Prince); (The Sorrows of Noma, translated by J. Marymont, 1919)
- Ayit Tzavua (1858) (Hypocrite Eagle)
- Ashmat Shomron (1865) (Guilt of Samaria)

== Commemorations ==
Streets bearing his name are found in the Kaunas Old Town and in the Israeli cities of Jerusalem, Tel Aviv, and Kiriat Ata. A well-known Israeli novel called "The Children from Mapu Street" ("הילדים מרחוב מאפו") also celebrates his name. In Kaunas A. Mapu Street a statue of A. Mapu with a book in his hand was established by the sculptor Martynas Gaubas in 2019.
