= Manuel Antonio Carreño =

Venezuelan musician, diplomat (1812–1874)

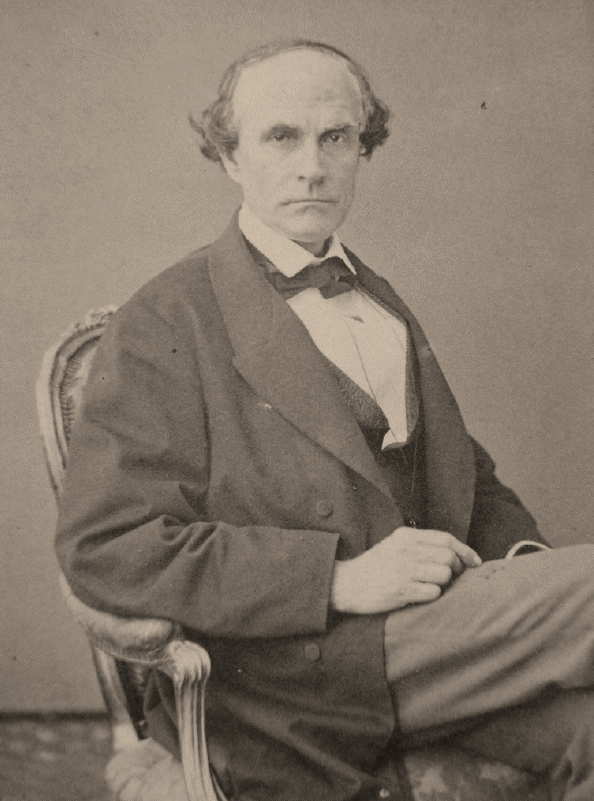
- Born: June 17, 1812; Caracas, Viceroyalty of New Granada
- Died: September 4, 1874 (aged 62); Paris, France
- Occupations: Musician, teacher, diplomat
- Children: Teresa Carreño

Manuel Antonio Carreño Muñoz (17 June 1812 – 4 September 1874) was a Venezuelan musician, teacher and diplomat. He reached many important goals in the field of diplomacy and teaching during his lifetime. He founded the prestigious Colegio Roscio and translated works like Reasoned, historical and dogmatic Catechism of Abbe Thériou and Introduction to the method to study the Latin language of Jean-Louis Burnouf into Spanish.

In 1853, he entered history with the publication of his Manual of Urbanity and Good Manners (nicknamed the "Manual of Carreño"), a sesquicentennial book that teaches and trains the individual in the management of decency, essential to the education of several generations, and reissued numerous times. He served as foreign minister and Minister of Finance of Venezuela. After his resignation from the latter post due to the Federal War, he left the country, living in New York and then in Paris, where he died.

== Biography ==
=== Early years ===
He was born in Caracas, the son of a musician Cayetano Carreño Rodríguez (choirmaster of the Cathedral of Caracas) and María de Jesús Muñoz. At home, he and his brothers got a solid cultural and musical training, which would allow them to stand out as excellent performers and composers. Hs showed great talent for pedagogy, leading him to found the Roscio College on September 1, 1841, which eventually came to enjoy great fame in Caracas. He was the nephew of Simon Narciso Rodriguez Carreño, better known as Simón Rodríguez, tutor and mentor of Simón Bolívar.

== Personal life ==
He was the father of Teresa Carreño, an acclaimed pianist and composer, whom he himself trained in musical arts in addition to propelling her career abroad. He was married to Clorinda García de Sena y Rodríguez del Toro.

=== Maturity ===
In 1853, he serialized the Manual of Urbanity and Good Manners, for which he received great recognition and fame. This manual had a great repercussion on a global level, to the point that it was approved to be taught in elementary schools in Spain. So this 1853 work was used as a text since the beginning, not only in Spain but in other Spanish-speaking countries as well. The Royal Order (of Spain), however, established that the new editions of this work should delete the references to the country for which they were written (Venezuela). The importance of this book is based on the fact that it was directed towards children of both sexes in a time where education was almost exclusively for boys and the more powerful social classes. The book elaborates on the moral and religious standards that were so important in the 19th century, that, evidently, had already been lost due to the long period of time that had passed. In referring to courtesy and good manners, one has to remember that, even though it may appear an exaggeration, this book exercised an enormous influence in educated Venezuelan society for many generations and even today, some of these standards are easily identifiable to foreigners who have recently arrived to the country, all from a European origin.

In late 1853, his daughter María Teresa was born, and from then, Manuel Antonio Carreño pursued her musical education. For this he wrote 500 piano exercises, which covered teaching and learning all the technical aspects of the instrument. On March 14, 1855, the National Congress gave a special recommendation for the use of the Manual of Urbanity and Good Customs. As part of his work as an educator, he translated the book in collaboration with Dr. Manuel María Urbanski, Catechism of Abbe Thériou and Introduction to the method to study the Latin language by Burnouf. He served as Minister of Foreign Relations (May–August 1861) and Minister of Finance (1861).

=== Emigration to France ===
Because of the political instability that existed in Venezuela as a result of the Federal War, he decided to leave his post and go abroad in search of better conditions for his daughter's artistic development. In this regard, on July 23, 1862, they departed together for New York, where they lived for a few years before departing for Paris. In Paris, where he died Carreño was a piano professor.

== See also ==
- Manual de Carreño
