= Georges Depping =

German-French historian and writer

Georges Bernard Depping (11 May 1784 – 5 September 1853), also known as Georg Bernhard Depping, was a German-French historian and writer.

== Biography ==
Depping was born in Münster, Westphalia, and moved to Paris in 1803, where he lived as a teacher and writer. He wrote books on a variety of subjects and prepared articles for various periodicals and encyclopedias.

== Works ==
=== History of the Jews during the Middle Ages ===
Depping wrote Les Juifs dans le moyen âge, essai historique sur leur état civil, commercial et littéraire (Paris, 1834; 2d ed., 1844; German transl., Stuttgart, 1834). He was especially attracted to the history of the Jews in Europe during the Middle Ages by “its wealth of instruction for us; one can see from this history how fanaticism has been able to root out kindness and neighborly love, . . . and what misfortunes met those exiles who in barbaric times wished to preserve their national customs and a religion offensive to those among whom they lived.”

The book owed its origin to the offer of a prize, in 1821, by the Royal Academy for a work describing the condition of the Jews in France during the medieval period. Depping's work was given an honorable mention, but did not win the prize.

He later enlarged the work, extending its scope to the general history of the Jews in Europe. The medieval Christian sources—documents, letters, chronicles, and histories, especially those dealing with the history of the Jews in France—were studied by Depping with great diligence and not without critical acumen. This fact gives importance to the book.

It is to be regretted that those rabbinical sources which were not accessible in the form of translations were but seldom consulted. As a consequence the few passages relating to the literature of the Jews are of no value (compare, especially on Rashi, pp. 113 et seq.; Zunz, “Z. G.” pp. 151, 446). The introduction (pp. v.-xxiv.) contains a short but valueless review of the history of the Jews up to their appearance in Europe. Depping's style is pleasing.

=== Bibliography ===
- Histoire générale de l'Espagne (“A general history of Spain,” 2 vols., 1811)
- Histoire des expéditions maritimes des Normands et de leur etablissement en France au dixième siècle (“History of the sea voyages of the Normans and their settlement in France during the 10th century,” 1826)
- Les soirées d'hiver, ou entretiens d'un père avec ses enfants sur le génie, les mœurs et l'industrie des divers peuples de la terre, a work for children which was popular and widely translated (“Winter evenings, or the instructions of a father to his children on the character, morals and activities of diverse peoples of the earth,” 2 vols., 3rd ed., 1832)
- Merveilles et beautés de la nature en France, another popular work for children (“Marvels and beauty of nature in France,” 2 vols., 1835)
- Histoire de la Normandie sous le regne de Guillaume le Conquérant et de ses successeurs (“History of Normandy during the reign of William the Conqueror and his successors,” 2 vols., 1835)
- Histoire du commerce entre le Levant et l'Europe, depuis les croisades jusqu'à la fondation des colonies d'Amérique (“Trade of Europe with the Levant from the Crusades up to the founding of the American colonies,” 2 vols., 1832)
- Erinnerungen aus dem Leben eines Deutschen in Paris, Leipzig (“Recollections from the life of a German in Paris,” 1832)
- La Grande Encyclopédie, xiv.179
- Encyc. Brit. New American Supplement, ii.1030
- Meyers Konversations-Lexikon, iv.746; Geiger
- Wiss. Zeit. Jüd. Theol. i.170, 182, 378; ii.504, 517.

He assisted Malte-Brun in his geographical works, and wrote descriptive sketches of Switzerland, Greece, England, and other countries. He contributed to French and German periodicals.
