= Les Châtiments =

Les Châtiments (French pronunciation: [le ʃatimɑ̃], "The Castigations" or "The Punishments") is a collection of poems by Victor Hugo, first published in 1853, that fiercely attack Napoléon III's Second Empire.

== Historical background ==
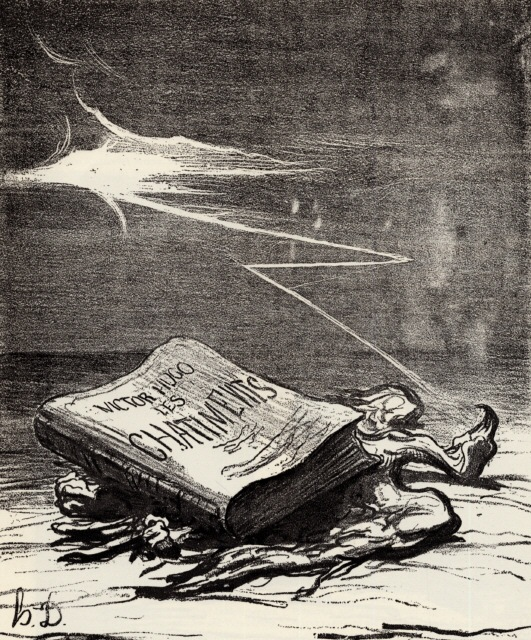

Louis-Napoléon had previously made unsuccessful attempts to gain power, leading to his exile in London. His final attempt resulted in a coup d'état on 2 December 1851. French guards opened fire on a group of protesters, causing several deaths. This did little to help achieve the reputation that Louis-Napoléon had hoped for. In addition to this, he proceeded to change the constitutional laws governing the length of time that an emperor could rule.

Hugo's sympathies lay with the working classes, and he was appalled by what he saw as a willingness to kill in order to gain power. Viewed as the voice of the masses in France, Hugo used his substantial influence to gather support against Louis-Napoléon. His contempt was best illustrated in a speech delivered to the Académie Française, where he declared, "Quoi? Après Augustus, nous avons Augustule!" This is a reference to the Roman emperor Augustus, and the suffix -ule derives from a Latin diminutive, indicating an object or person that is smaller in stature. This deliberately antagonistic declaration encapsulates Hugo's view: Louis-Napoléon was far removed from the great military leader that his uncle, Napoleon Bonaparte, had been.

In addition, Louis-Napoléon's legitimacy was also brought into question. Rumours abounded (although none was ever proven) that he was an illegitimate child—a product of one of his mother's numerous affairs – and therefore could claim no right to his title. Hugo seizes on this in an attempt to discredit his position and title.

His vociferous condemnation of Louis-Napoléon as a traitor, usurper and dictator put Hugo and his family in danger . Realising this, Hugo fled his beloved France, vowing never to return until a new order was installed. After stopping in Brussels and then Jersey, Hugo settled with his family in Guernsey and remained there until 1870. Despite the distance from his readership, Hugo's influence remained strong and the years in exile produced a flurry of literary activity.

Written in 1853, Les Châtiments is arguably Hugo's most scathing work, including Les Égouts ("The sewers"), which contrasts the lives of the poor whom Hugo claims Louis-Napoléon ignored with the pompous grandeur to which the emperor aspired. Even the editor of the collection claimed that Hugo had gone too far with his vehement criticisms of the Second Empire. However, even if Hugo's comments did exaggerate the failings of Louis-Napoléon's regime, they present a strong critique of a society bound by censorship of the press and the arts.

== Literary techniques ==
Hugo resorts to extreme measures to portray Louis-Napoléon as ruler with much blood on his hands, and Les Châtiments is littered with references to corrupt and flawed historical figures. Some better known than others, they all gained notoriety for their corrupt and cruel natures. A device particularly favoured by Hugo is the comparison to Roman emperors, such as Caligula, Claudius and Julius Caesar. Allusions to the Bible include Judas Iscariot, Barabbas and Cain. Others include European leaders and French criminals who were well known in their days.

Not satisfied with evil despots and tyrants, Hugo also turns to animalistic imagery as a means of implying that Louis-Napoléon is less than human. References to snakes, crocodiles, worms, bees, wasps and spiders can be found.

Hugo reserves the vous form of address for Napoleon Bonaparte. Along with being the polite form of address in French, it also denotes respect for someone in a higher position of power. The tu is used in a disparaging way for Louis-Napoléon. It would be unthinkable that anybody should address the Emperor of the French in such a way. This form of address may denote familiarity between friends, but this is not Hugo's intention and it is used purely to belittle a futile leader.

It is said that Napoleon III read the work thoroughly and kept a copy by his bedside. He is said to have been so devastated by Hugo's vicious condemnation that he never fully recovered from the shock of his first reading. There was even an attempt to reconcile with Hugo, with Louis-Napoléon publicly extending an invitation for Hugo to return to France; Hugo declined and did not return until 1870 and the proclamation of the Third Republic.

One could equally argue that the failings of that same regime would indeed be difficult to exaggerate in terms of the time in which Hugo lived. This is very important to keep in mind: while Napoleon III, who was influenced by Saint-Simonianism, was no Hitler, and some of his policies are recognized as liberal, Hugo was a much-needed voice for continued social change in an impoverished, 19th-century France.

== Legacy ==
L'Expiation from Les Châtiments, about the Battle of Waterloo, is parodied in Asterix in Belgium when Caesar fights a battle against the Belgians resembling the Battle of Waterloo. The actions on the battlefield are accompanied by verses which parody this poem.

Les Châtiments has never been out of print and is still studied in universities today.
