= Maria Jane McIntosh =

American novelist

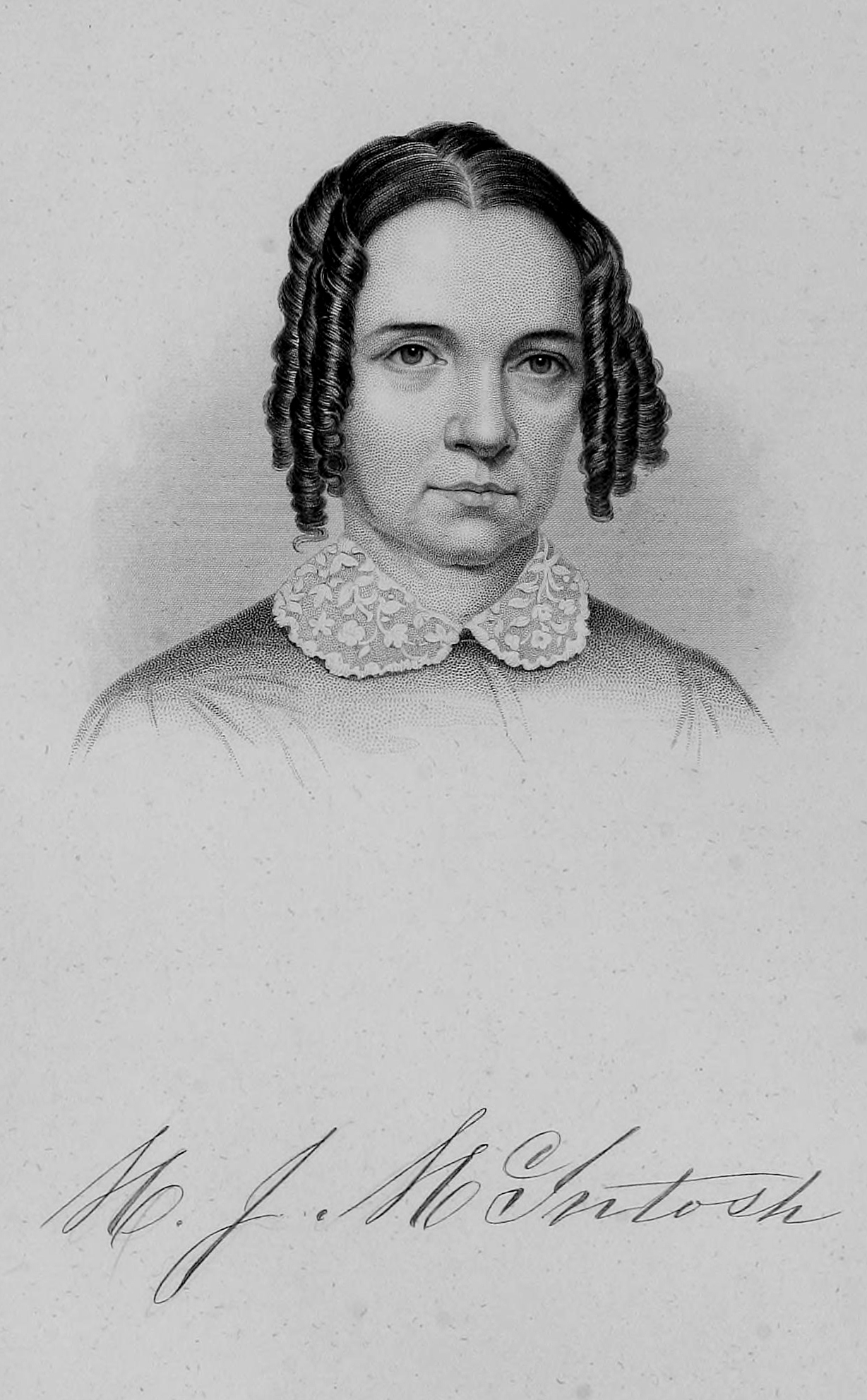
- Born: 1803; Sunbury, Georgia, United States
- Died: February 25, 1878 (aged 74–75); Morristown, New Jersey, United States
- Occupations: children's writer, novelist, essayist
- Writing career
- Pen name: Aunt Kitty
- Period: 1841-1863
- Notable work: The Lofty and the Lowly (1853)

Maria Jane McIntosh (1803 – February 25, 1878) was an American novelist, children's writer, and essayist. She began her literary career under the pseudonym Aunt Kitty, publishing a series of moralistic children's stories before turning to novels in the 1840s.

McIntosh's writings addressed morality, gender roles, and contemporary social issues. In Woman in America: Her Work and Her Reward (1850), she opposed the emerging women's rights movement and advocated for women's moral influence within the domestic sphere. McIntosh also wrote about contemporary political issues. She defended slavery in both fiction and nonfiction. Her novel The Lofty and the Lowly, written in response to the antislavery literature of the period, presented a sympathetic depiction of the plantations in the South.

== Early life and education ==
McIntosh was born in 1803 in Sunbury, Georgia, to Lachlan and Mary Moore Maxwell McIntosh. Lachlan McIntosh was a major in the American Revolutionary War and afterwards established a law practice in Sunbury. When McIntosh was three, her father died. She was educated at home by her mother and later attended the coeducational Sunbury Academy. In 1820, she studied at Baiden's Bluff Academy.

After her mother's death in 1823, McIntosh managed the family's plantation until it was sold in 1835. She moved to New York City to live with her half-brother, James MacKay McIntosh, and invested the proceeds from the sale of the estate in New York securities. Two years later, she lost her savings in the Panic of 1837. To support herself, she began writing under the pen name Aunt Kitty.

== Career ==
=== Children's stories ===
Although begun in 1838, McIntosh's first children's story, Blind Alice, was not published until 1841. In the book, she contrasted a selfish child with an unselfish one to show that virtuous behavior resulted in happiness. McIntosh would repeat the device of contrasting virtue with vice in her other books. Blind Alice was well received and McIntosh followed it up with several other children's stories. From 1841 to 1843, she wrote Jessie Graham, Florence Arnott, Grace and Clara, and Ellen Leslie. Her final book published under the Aunt Kitty pseudonym was The Cousins, a Tale for Children, which appeared in late 1845. In 1847, her children's stories were collected and issued in one volume as Aunt Kitty's Tales.

=== Novels ===
In 1843, McIntosh began writing novels. Her first novels—Conquest and Self-Conquest, Woman an Enigma, and Praise and Principle—were published anonymously. Two Lives, released in 1846, was the first novel McIntosh published under her own name. Two Lives was very popular and ultimately had seven editions published. Her popularity with readers continued, and her 1848 novel Charms and Counter-Charms went through eight editions. McIntosh's novels sold well in England and France as well as in the United States. She continued to publish regularly over the next several years; her last novel, Two Pictures, appeared in 1863.

McIntosh's novels frequently emphasized morality, particularly the need to prioritize conscience over a desire for social approval. Her works often contrasted outward appearances and social reputation with inner character, presenting virtue as a matter of how a woman conducts herself rather than as a reflection of her social standing. Her female protagonists commonly learn to exercise independent judgment rather than relying on romantic attachment. These themes are situated within a Christian framework in which family life and duty serve as means of moral development.

=== Social and political writings ===
In 1850, McIntosh published a nonfiction book, Woman in America: Her Work and Her Reward. In it, she argued against the emerging women's rights movement and advocated distinct social roles for men and women. McIntosh stated that women should use their influence in the home to promote virtuous behavior in the wider world. The influence she recommended differed by region. Women in the West were to Americanize immigrants; women in the South were to Christianize enslaved people; and those in the North to combat materialism.

In 1853, McIntosh wrote a pamphlet titled Letter on the Address of the Women of England to Their Sisters of America. In Relation to Slavery. Reprinted from The New York Observer, the pamphlet claimed that enslaved Africans and their descendants were better off in the United States than Africans living in Africa. Scholar Jennifer Hynes wrote of the pamphlet, "Slave owning is painted as missionary work, while Northern capitalism appears as a selfish moneymaking system." McIntosh also published the pro-slavery novel The Lofty and the Lowly in 1853. This novel presented Southerners and their way of life as chivalrous and Northerners as predatory. The novel was one of several works written in this era in reaction to the success of Harriet Beecher Stowe's anti-slavery novel Uncle Tom's Cabin. The Lofty and the Lowly proved very popular. Eight editions were published, and it received many positive reviews.

== Critical reception and legacy ==
McIntosh was one of the most popular novelists of her time. John Seely Hart included her in his 1852 anthology The Female Prose Writers of America, and she was also included in the 1855 Cyclopaedia of American Literature as a notable writer. Despite having been widely read in the 1800s, modern-day scholar Katharine A. Burnett notes that "Maria Jane McIntosh is now largely forgotten by general readers and has received comparatively little scholarly attention." Burnett attributes the author's declining reputation in part to her fiction's didacticism, its promotion of restrictive gender roles, and its defense of slavery. However, Burnett argues that McIntosh's fiction remains historically significant for its depiction of slavery and Southern regional identity during the antebellum period.

== Personal life ==
In 1859, McIntosh traveled in Europe. After returning to New York, she taught briefly at Miss Henrietta B. Haines's school. McIntosh died on February 25, 1878, in Morristown, New Jersey, where she was living with her niece, who was also named Maria McIntosh Cox.

== Selected works ==
- Blind Alice (1841)
- Conquest and Self-Conquest (1844)
- Praise and Principle (1845)
- Two Lives, to Seem and to Be (1846)
- Aunt Kitty's Tales (1847)
- Charms and Counter-Charms (1848)
- Woman in America: Her Work and Her Reward (1850)
- Evenings at Donaldson Manor (1852)
- The Lofty and the Lowly (1853)
- Emily Herbert (1855)
- Violet, or the Cross and Crown (1856)
- Meta Gray (1858)
- Two Pictures (1863)

== See also ==
Anti-Tom literature
