= Aesthetic of Ugliness =

Aesthetic of Ugliness (Aesthetik des Hässlichen) is a book by German philosopher Karl Rosenkranz, written in 1853. It is among the earliest writings on the philosophy of ugliness and "draws an analogy between ugliness and moral evil".

Introduction Section 1: Formlessness Section 2: Incorrectness Section 3: Deformation or Disfiguration Conclusion
