= 1876 =

1876 in various calendars
- Gregorian calendar: 1876; MDCCCLXXVI
- Ab urbe condita: 2629
- Armenian calendar: 1325; ԹՎ ՌՅԻԵ
- Assyrian calendar: 6626
- Baháʼí calendar: 32–33
- Balinese saka calendar: 1797–1798
- Bengali calendar: 1282–1283
- Berber calendar: 2826
- British Regnal year: 39 Vict. 1 – 40 Vict. 1
- Buddhist calendar: 2420
- Burmese calendar: 1238
- Byzantine calendar: 7384–7385
- Chinese calendar: 乙亥年 (Wood Pig); 4573 or 4366 — to — 丙子年 (Fire Rat); 4574 or 4367
- Coptic calendar: 1592–1593
- Discordian calendar: 3042
- Ethiopian calendar: 1868–1869
- Hebrew calendar: 5636–5637
- Hindu calendars
- Vikram Samvat: 1932–1933
- Shaka Samvat: 1797–1798
- Kali Yuga: 4976–4977
- Holocene calendar: 11876
- Igbo calendar: 876–877
- Iranian calendar: 1254–1255
- Islamic calendar: 1292–1293
- Japanese calendar: Meiji 9 (明治９年)
- Javanese calendar: 1804–1805
- Julian calendar: Gregorian minus 12 days
- Korean calendar: 4209
- Minguo calendar: 36 before ROC 民前36年
- Nanakshahi calendar: 408
- Thai solar calendar: 2418–2419
- Tibetan calendar: ཤིང་མོ་ཕག་ལོ་ (female Wood-Boar); 2002 or 1621 or 849 — to — མེ་ཕོ་བྱི་བ་ལོ་ (male Fire-Rat); 2003 or 1622 or 850

1876 (MDCCCLXXVI) was a leap year starting on Saturday of the Gregorian calendar and a leap year starting on Thursday of the Julian calendar, the 1876th year of the Common Era (CE) and Anno Domini (AD) designations, the 876th year of the 2nd millennium, the 76th year of the 19th century, and the 7th year of the 1870s decade. As of the start of 1876, the Gregorian calendar was 12 days ahead of the Julian calendar, which remained in localized use until 1923.

== Events ==
=== January ===
- January 1
  - The Reichsbank opens in Berlin.
  - The Bass Brewery Red Triangle becomes the world's first registered trademark symbol, in the United Kingdom.
- January 27 – The Northampton Bank robbery occurs in Massachusetts.

=== February ===
- February 2
  - Third Carlist War (Spain): Battle of Montejurra – The new commander General Fernando Primo de Rivera marches on the remaining Carlist stronghold at Estella, where he meets a force of about 1,600 men under General Carlos Calderón, at nearby Montejurra. After a courageous and costly defence, Calderón is forced to withdraw.
  - The National League of Professional Base Ball Clubs is formed at a meeting in Chicago; it replaces the National Association of Professional Base Ball Players. Morgan Bulkeley of the Hartford Dark Blues is selected as the league's first president.
- February 14 – Alexander Graham Bell applies for a U.S. patent for the telephone, as does Elisha Gray.
- February 19 – Third Carlist War: Government troops under General Primo de Rivera drive through the weak Carlist forces protecting Estella and take the city by storm.
- February 22 – Johns Hopkins University is founded in Baltimore, Maryland.
- February 24 – The first stage production of the verse-play Peer Gynt by Henrik Ibsen premieres, with incidental music by Edvard Grieg, in Christiania (modern-day Oslo), Norway.
- February 26 – The Japanese force the Korean government to sign the Japan–Korea Treaty of 1876 (having brought a fleet to Incheon, the port of modern-day Seoul), opening three ports to Japanese trade and forcing Korea's Joseon dynasty to cease considering itself a tributary of China. On China's urging, Korea also signs treaties with the European powers, in an effort to counterbalance Japan.
- February 28 – Third Carlist War: The Carlist forces do not succeed, and the promises are never fulfilled. The Carlist pretender Carlos, Duke of Madrid, goes into exile in France, bringing the conflict to an end after four years.
- February–March – The Harvard Lampoon humor magazine is founded in Cambridge, Massachusetts.

=== March ===
- March 2 – United States Secretary of War William W. Belknap resigns his office in the wake of the trader post scandal.
- March 7 – Alexander Graham Bell is granted a United States patent for the telephone.
- March 10 – Alexander Graham Bell makes the first successful telephone call, saying "Mr. Watson, come here, I want to see you".
- March 20 – Through constitutional reform taking legal effect, Louis De Geer becomes the first Prime Minister of Sweden.
- March
  - Thousands of Plains Indians in the United States travel to an encampment of the Sioux chief Sitting Bull in the region of the Little Bighorn River, creating the last great gathering of native peoples on the Great Plains.
  - American librarian Melvil Dewey first publishes the Dewey Decimal Classification system.

=== April ===
- April 1 – Lars Magnus Ericsson starts a small mechanical workshop in Stockholm, Sweden (from April 27 partnering with Carl Johan Andersson), dealing with telegraphy equipment, which grows into the worldwide company Ericsson.
- April 12 – The Indian Act comes into force in Canada.
- April 17 – Friends Academy is founded by Gideon Frost at Locust Valley, New York.

=== May ===
- May 1
  - The Royal Titles Act 1876 in the UK Parliament confers the title 'Empress of India' upon Queen Victoria from 1877.
  - The Settle–Carlisle Railway in England is opened to passenger traffic (it opened to goods traffic in 1875).
- May 2 (April 20 O.S.) – April Uprising of 1876 in Ottoman Bulgaria begins: members of the Bulgarian Revolutionary Central Committee rise up against their Ottoman Empire overlords. Over the course of one month and 6 days, the rebellion is suppressed by irregular Ottoman bashi-bazouk units that engage in indiscriminate slaughter of both rebels and non-combatants, killing 15,000–30,000, including the principal rebel leaders and around 5,000 in the Batak massacre. Although the rising does not immediately succeed in its aims, reports of the "Bulgarian Horrors" cause a public outcry in the West and the liberation of Bulgaria is achieved two years later.
- May 10
  - The Centennial Exposition begins in Philadelphia.
  - Major pharmaceutical brand Eli Lilly is founded in Indiana, United States.
- May 11/12 – Berlin Memorandum: Germany, Russia and Austria-Hungary propose an armistice between Turkey and its insurgents.
- May 16
  - British Prime Minister Benjamin Disraeli rejects the Berlin Memorandum.
  - German American "Napoleon of crime" Adam Worth steals Gainsborough's Portrait of Georgiana, Duchess of Devonshire from a London gallery three weeks after its sale at Christie's for 10,000 guineas, the highest price ever paid for a painting at auction at this time. It is not recovered until 1901.
- May 17 – Nicolaus Otto files his patent for the four-stroke cycle internal combustion engine.
- May 18 – Wyatt Earp starts work in Dodge City, Kansas, serving under Marshal Larry Deger.
- May 29 – The United States Senate votes 37 to 29 that U.S. Secretary of War William W. Belknap cannot be barred from trial and impeachment, despite being a private citizen; however, this is far short of the two-thirds majority required and thus he is acquitted.
- May 30
  - Abdülaziz is deposed by his nephew Murad V as Sultan of the Ottoman Empire on the grounds of mismanaging the economy; 6 days later, Abdülaziz is found dead at the Çırağan Palace in Istanbul and 93 days later Murad is deposed by Abdul Hamid II on the grounds of mental illness. For this reason, in Turkey 1876 is known as the 'Year of the Three Sultans'.
  - The Ems Ukaz, a secret decree, is issued by Tsar Alexander II of Russia in the German city of Bad Ems, aimed at stopping the printing and distribution of Ukrainian-language publications in the Russian Empire.

=== June ===
- June 4 – The Transcontinental Express arrives in San Francisco via the first transcontinental railroad, 83 hours and 39 minutes after having left New York City.
- June 6 – The Association of Medical Officers of American Institutions for Idiotic and Feebleminded Persons, later known as the American Association on Intellectual and Developmental Disabilities, is founded when several directors led by Édouard Séguin, inspired by Centennial events, meet to improve the lives of those with disabilities.
- June 17 – American Indian Wars: Battle of the Rosebud – 1,500 Sioux and Cheyenne, led by Crazy Horse, beat back General George Crook's forces at Rosebud Creek in Montana Territory.
- June 19 – Jászkunság, the last remnant of Kunság within Austria-Hungary, is disestablished.
- June 25/26 – American Indian Wars: Battle of the Little Bighorn: 300 men of the U.S. 7th Cavalry Regiment under Lieutenant Colonel George Armstrong Custer are wiped out by 2,000 Lakota, Cheyenne and Arapaho, led by Sitting Bull and Crazy Horse.

=== July ===
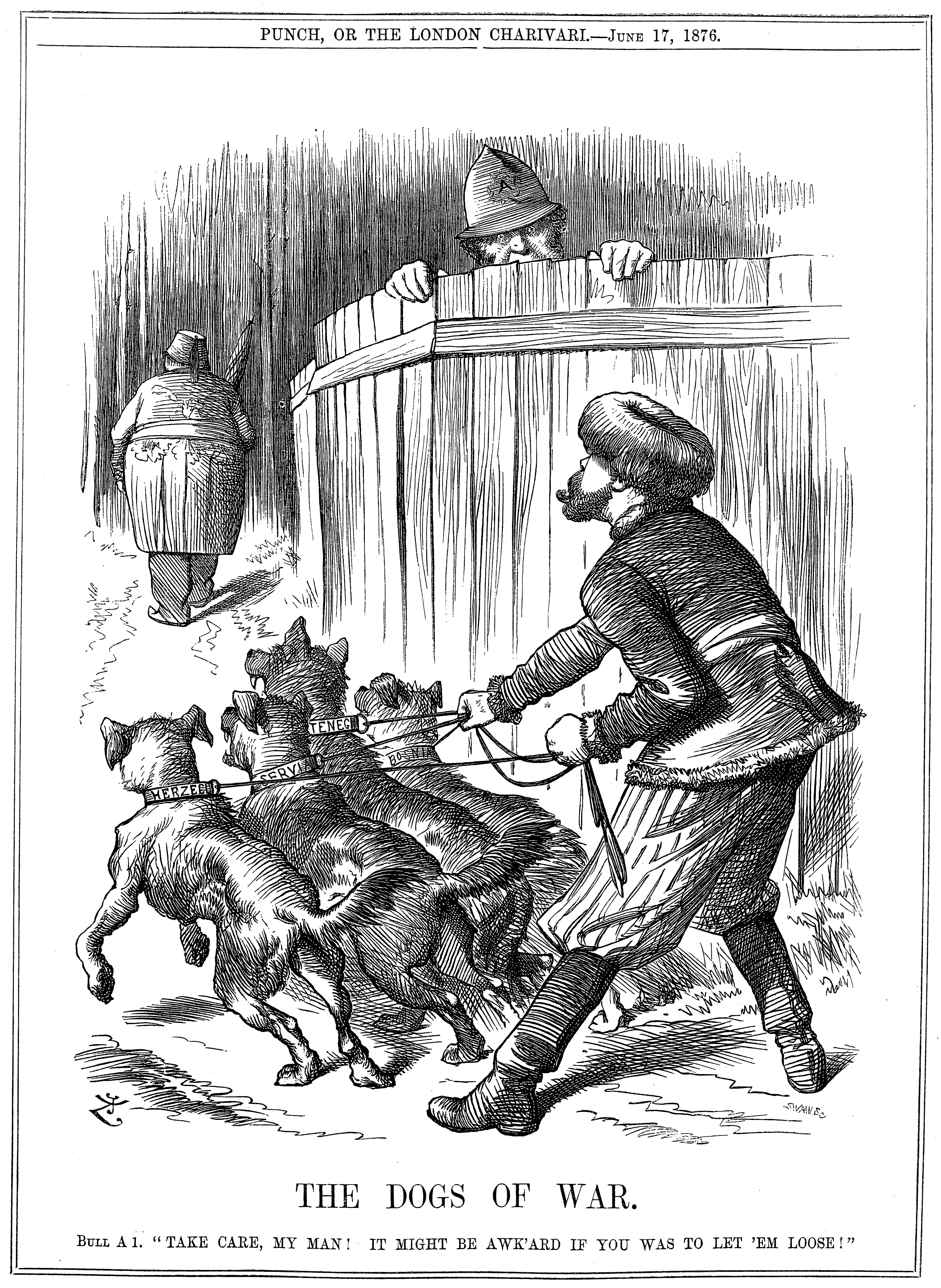
Punch cartoon from June 17. Russia preparing to let slip the "Dogs of War", its imminent engagement in the growing Balkan conflict between Slavic states and Turkey, while policeman John Bull (Britain) warns Russia to take care. The Slavic states of Serbia and Montenegro would declare war on Turkey two weeks later.

- July 1 – Serbia declares war on the Ottoman Empire.
- July 2 – Montenegro declares war on the Ottoman Empire.
- July 4 – The United States Centennial Exposition is celebrated across the country.
- July 8 – Reichstadt Agreement: Russia and Austria-Hungary agree on partitioning the Balkan Peninsula.
- July 13 – The prosecution of Arthur Tooth, an Anglican clergyman, for using ritualist practices begins.

=== August ===
- August 1
  - Colorado is admitted as the 38th U.S. state.
  - The United States Senate votes to acquit former Secretary of War William W. Belknap of all impeachment charges relating to the trader post scandal.
- August 2 – Wild Bill Hickok is murdered in Deadwood, South Dakota.
- August 6 – The first issue of Arabic language newspaper Al-Ahram is published by Saleem and Beshara Takla in Alexandria, Muhammad Ali dynasty (modern-day Egypt).
- August 8 – Thomas Edison receives a patent for his mimeograph.
- August 13 – A performance of Wagner's Das Rheingold opens the first Ring cycle at the first Bayreuth Festival.
- August 14 – Prairie View A&M University, at the time named Alta Vista Agriculture & Mechanical College of Texas for Colored Youth, is founded, the first state-supported HBCU in the state of Texas.
- August 31 – Murad V, Sultan of the Ottoman Empire, is deposed and succeeded by his brother Abdul Hamid II.

=== September ===
- September 5 – British Prime Minister William Gladstone publishes his Bulgarian Horrors pamphlet.
- September 7 – In Northfield, Minnesota, Jesse James and the James–Younger Gang attempt to rob the town's bank, but are surrounded by an angry mob and nearly wiped out.
- September 12 – King Leopold II of Belgium hosts the Brussels Geographic Conference, on the subject of colonizing and exploring central Africa. By the event's conclusion, a new international body named the International African Association (indirect forerunner of the modern Congo state) is established.
- September 26 – Global consumer goods and personal care company Henkel is founded by Friedrich Karl Henkel in Aachen, Germany.

=== October ===
- October 4 – Texas A&M University opens for classes.
- October 6 – The American Library Association is founded in Philadelphia.
- October 26 – José María Iglesias begins his disputed presidency of Mexico.
- October 31 – The great 1876 Bengal cyclone strikes the coast of modern-day Bangladesh, killing 200,000.

=== November ===
- November 1 – The British Colony of New Zealand dissolves its 9 provinces and replaces them with 63 counties.
- November 4 – The long-awaited First Symphony of Johannes Brahms has its première at Karlsruhe, under the baton of Otto Dessoff.
- November 7
  - 1876 United States presidential election: After long and heated disputes, Rutherford B. Hayes is eventually declared the winner over Samuel J. Tilden.
  - A failed grave robbery of the Lincoln Tomb takes place this night.
- November 10 – The Centennial Exposition ends in Philadelphia, Pennsylvania.
- November 23 – Corrupt Tammany Hall leader William Marcy Tweed (better known as Boss Tweed) is delivered to authorities in New York City, after being captured in Spain.
- November 25 – American Indian Wars: Dull Knife Fight – In retaliation for the dramatic American defeat at the Battle of the Little Bighorn, United States Army troops under General Ranald S. Mackenzie sack Chief Dull Knife's sleeping Cheyenne village at the headwaters of the Powder River (Montana). The soldiers destroy all of the villagers' winter food and clothing, and then slash their ponies' throats.
- November 29 – Porfirio Díaz becomes President of Mexico.

=== December ===
- December 2 – Chugai Economic Daily, predecessor of Nikkei Economic Daily (Nihon Keizai Shinbun), is first issued in Tokyo, Japan.
- December 5 – The Brooklyn Theatre fire kills at least 278, possibly more than 300.
- December 6 – The first cremation in the United States takes place, in a crematory built by Francis Julius LeMoyne at North Franklin Township, Pennsylvania.
- December 13 – New Constitution of the Ottoman Empire signed, ending Tanzimat in the Ottoman Empire.
- December 23 – Constantinople Conference opens.
- December 29 – The Ashtabula River railroad disaster occurs in Ohio when a bridge collapses, leaving 92 dead.
- December – The first American edition of Mark Twain's The Adventures of Tom Sawyer is published by the American Publishing Company; a British edition has appeared in early June in London with the first review appearing on June 24 in a British magazine.

=== Date unknown ===
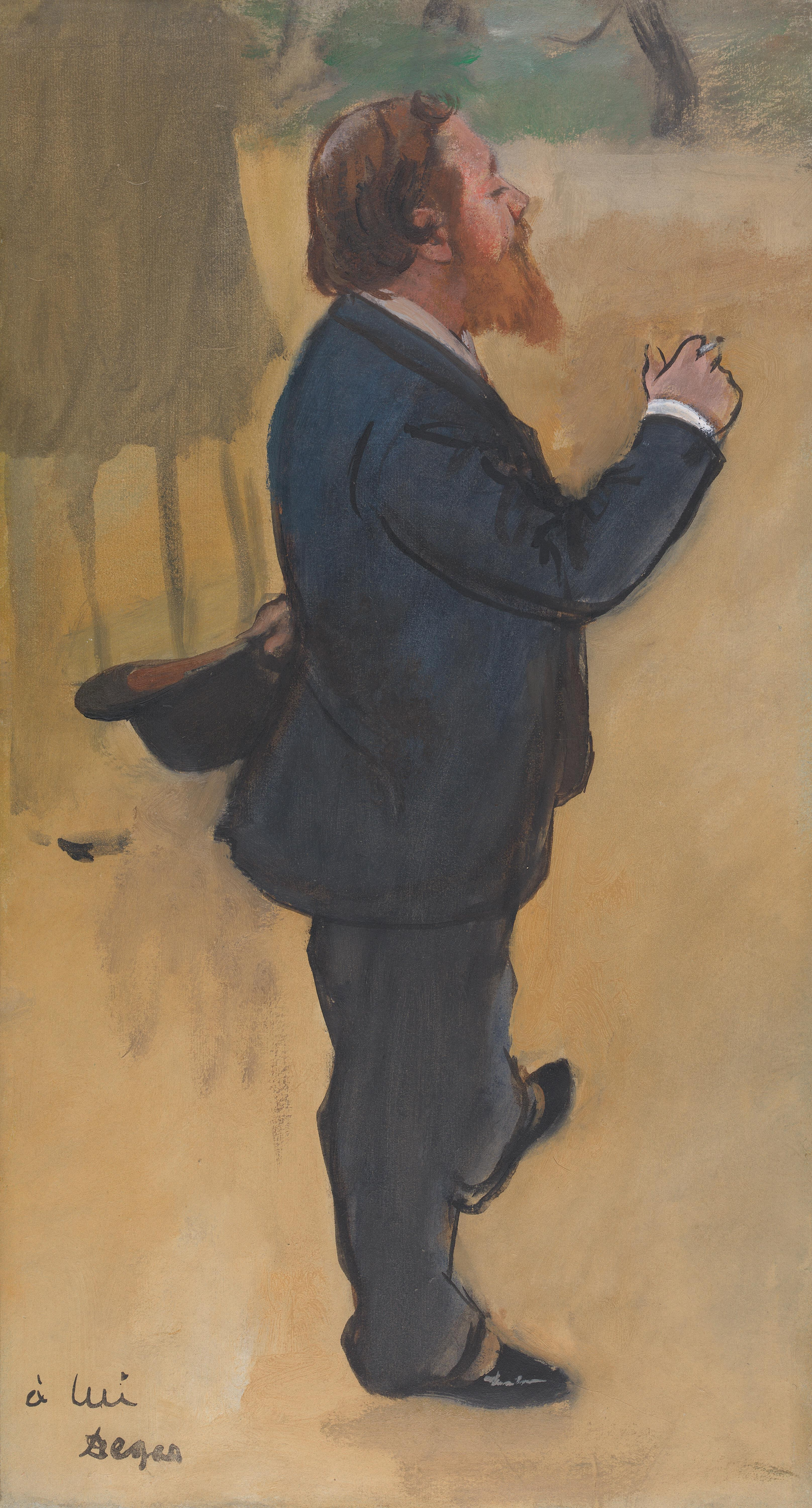
Carlo Pellegrini (caricaturist) by Edgar Degas, c. 1876 - Medium: Oil paint on paper mounted on board; Dimensions: Frame: 800 × 515 × 85 mm support: 632 × 340 mm; Collection: Tate.

- The Northern Chinese Famine of 1876–79, which will claim 30 million lives and become the 5th-worst famine in recorded history, begins after the droughts of the previous year.
- Heinz Tomato Ketchup is introduced in the United States.
- Adolphus Busch's brewery, Anheuser-Busch in St. Louis, Missouri, first markets Budweiser, a pale lager, as a nationally sold beer.
- Charles Wells opens his brewery, based in Bedford, England.
- Star Oil Company, predecessor of the global Chevron energy product and sales brand, is founded in California.
- Emile Berliner invents an improved form of microphone which will be adopted for Alexander Graham Bell's telephone.
- Lyford House, by Richardson Bay, Tiburon, California, is constructed.
- Construction of Spandau Prison in Berlin is completed.
- Samurai are banned from carrying swords in Japan, and their stipends are replaced by a one-time grant of income-bearing bonds.
- The Conchological Society of Great Britain & Ireland is founded.
- Heinrich Schliemann begins excavation at Mycenae.
- Stockport Lacrosse Club, thought to be the oldest existing lacrosse club in the world, is founded at Cale Green Cricket Club in Davenport, near Manchester in England, where they will still be playing in the 21st century.

== Births ==
=== January–March ===
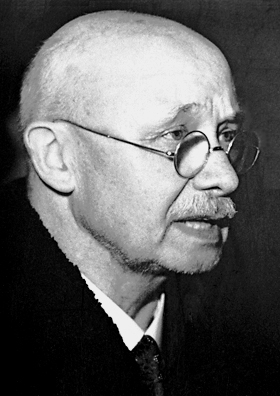
Otto Diels

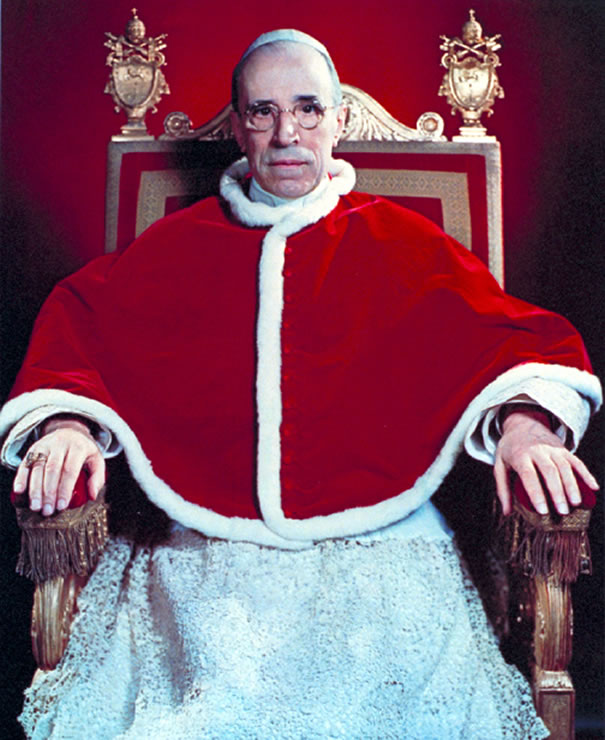
Pope Pius XII

- January 5 – Konrad Adenauer, Chancellor of Germany (d. 1967)
- January 8 – Arturs Alberings, Prime Minister of Latvia (d. 1934)
- January 12
  - Ermanno Wolf-Ferrari, Italian composer (d. 1948)
  - Jack London, American author (d. 1916)
- January 20 – Józef Hofmann, Polish pianist (d. 1967)
- January 22 – Bess Houdini, wife, stage partner of Harry Houdini (d. 1943)
- January 23 – Otto Diels, German chemist, Nobel Prize laureate (d. 1954)
- January 24 – Theodor Tobler, Swiss chocolatier, founder of Toblerone (d. 1941)
- January 29 – Havergal Brian, British composer (d. 1972)
- February 8 – Paula Modersohn-Becker, German painter (d. 1907)
- February 12 – Thubten Gyatso, 13th Dalai Lama (d. 1933)
- February 16
  - Mack Swain, American actor (d. 1935)
  - G. M. Trevelyan, British historian (d. 1962)
- February 19 – Constantin Brâncuși, Romanian sculptor (d. 1957)
- February 22 – Zitkala-Sa, Native American writer, activist, editor, educator and translator (d. 1938)
- February 23 – Senjūrō Hayashi, Japanese general and politician, Prime Minister of Japan (d. 1943)
- March 1 – Henri de Baillet-Latour, Belgian International Olympic Committee president (d. 1942)
- March 2
  - James A. Gilmore, American businessman and baseball executive (d. 1947)
  - Pope Pius XII (d. 1958)
- March 4 – Theodore Hardeen, Hungarian magician and stunt performer, founder of the Magician's Guild (d. 1945)
- March 5 – Tiburcio Carías Andino, 24th President of Honduras (d. 1969)
- March 6 – A. A. Kannisto, Finnish politician (d. 1930)
- March 7 – Edgar Evans, Welsh naval seaman and polar explorer (d. 1912)
- March 11 – Carl Ruggles, American composer (d. 1971)
- March 15 – Óscar R. Benavides, 67th and 76th President of Peru (d. 1945)
- March 21 – Walter Tewksbury, American athlete (d. 1968)
- March 22 – Henry O'Malley, American fish culturist, United States Commissioner of Fisheries (d. 1936)
- March 23 – Ziya Gökalp, Turkish writer and poet (d. 1924)
- March 26 – Wilhelm, Prince of Albania, sovereign Prince of Albania (d. 1945)
- March 31 – Borisav Stanković, Serbian writer (d. 1927)

=== April–June ===
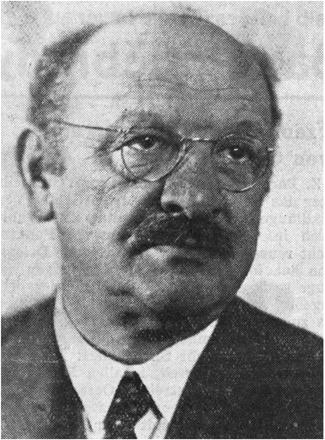
Oskar Fischer

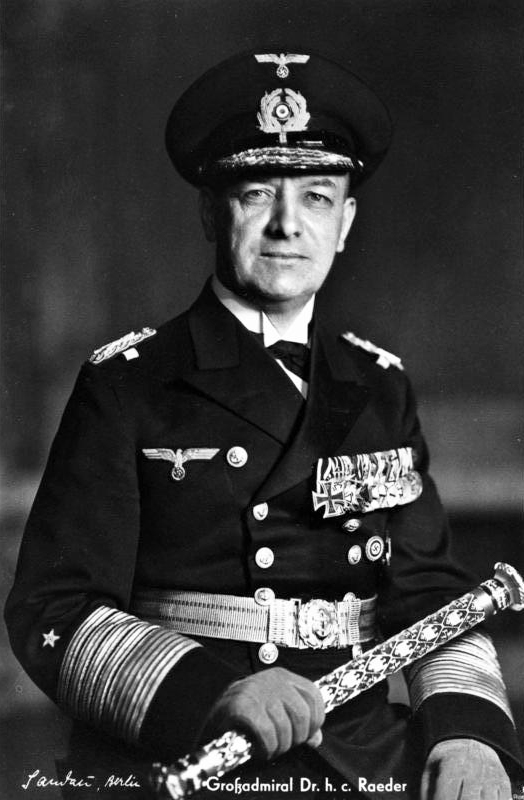
Erich Raeder

- April 1
  - Peter Strasser, German naval officer, airship commander (d. 1918)
  - James Young Deer, Native American film producer (d. 1946)
- April 3 – Margaret Anglin, Canadian stage actress (d. 1958)
- April 4
  - Bolesław Roja, Polish general (d. 1940)
  - Maurice de Vlaminck, French painter, poet (d. 1958)
- April 9 – Ettore Bastico, Italian field marshal (d. 1972)
- April 11 – Paul Henry, Irish artist (d. 1958)
- April 12 – Oskar Fischer, Czech Scientist (d. 1942)
- April 14 – Sir Murray Bisset, South African cricketer, Governor of Southern Rhodesia (d. 1931)
- April 22 – Róbert Bárány, Hungarian physician, recipient of the Nobel Prize in Physiology or Medicine (d. 1936)
- April 23 – Mary Ellicott Arnold, American social activist, writer (d. 1968)
- April 24 – Erich Raeder, German admiral (d. 1960)
- April 26 – Mariam Thresia Chiramel, Indian Catholic professed religious and stigmatist (d. 1926)
- May 8 – Protógenes Guimarães, Brazilian admiral and politician (d. 1938)
- May 10
  - Ivan Cankar, Slovenian writer (d. 1918)
  - Shigeru Honjō, Japanese general (d. 1945)
- May 18 – Hermann Müller, Chancellor of Germany (d. 1931)
- June 4 – Clara Blandick, American actress (d. 1962)
- June 13 – William Sealy Gosset, English chemist and statistician (d. 1937)
- June 19 – Sir Nigel Gresley, English steam locomotive engineer (Flying Scotsman & Mallard) (d. 1941)
- June 22 – Madeleine Vionnet, French fashion designer (d. 1975)

=== July–September ===
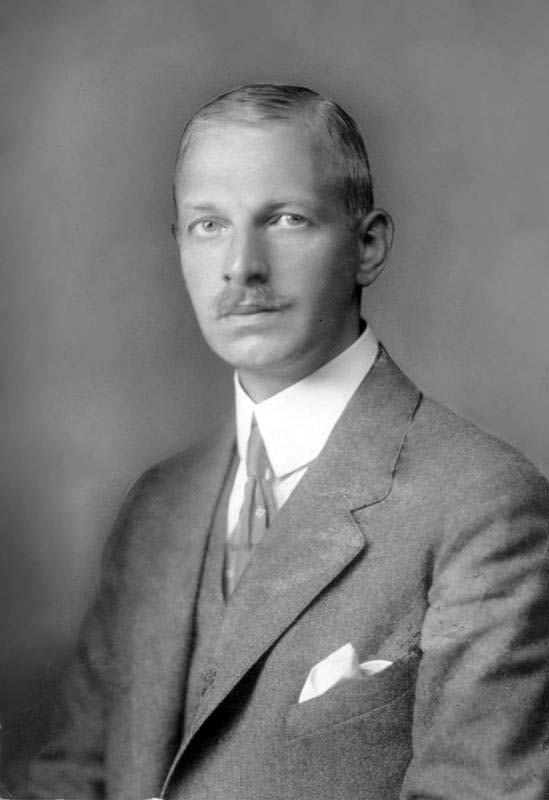
Wilhelm Cuno

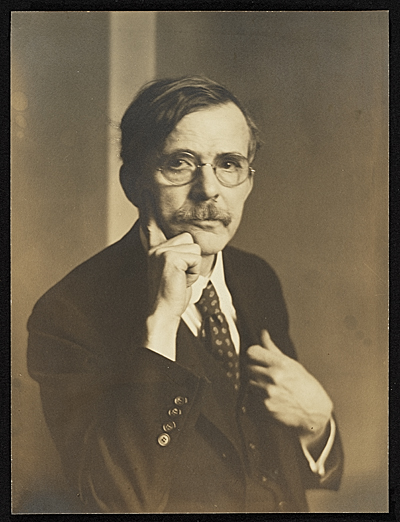
Alphaeus Philemon Cole

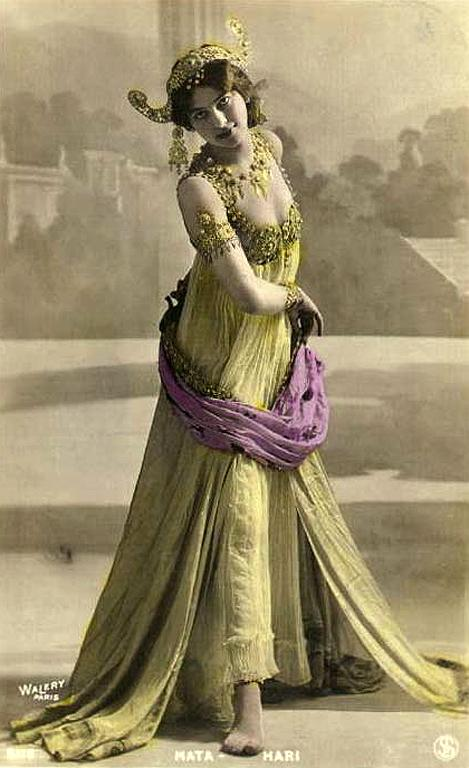
Mata Hari

- July 2 – Wilhelm Cuno, Chancellor of Germany (d. 1933)
- July 3 – George Murray Levick, British Antarctic explorer and naval surgeon (d. 1956)
- July 6 – Luis Emilio Recabarren, Chilean politician, founder of the Communist Party of Chile. (d. 1924)
- July 8 – Alexandros Papanastasiou, 2-time prime minister of Greece (d. 1936)
- July 12
  - Max Jacob, French poet (d. 1944)
  - Alphaeus Philemon Cole, American artist, engraver, etcher and supercentenarian (d. 1988)
- July 16 – Alfred Stock, German chemist (d. 1946)
- July 19
  - Ignaz Seipel, 4th Chancellor of Austria (d. 1932)
  - Joseph Fielding Smith, 10th president of the Church of Jesus Christ of Latter-day Saints (d. 1972)
- July 29 – Maria Ouspenskaya, Russian actress, acting teacher (d. 1949)
- August 5 – Sydney Spencer Sawrey-Cookson, British judge (d. 1933)
- August 7 – Mata Hari, Dutch exotic dancer, spy (d. 1917)
- August 15 – Stylianos Gonatas, Prime Minister of Greece (d. 1966)
- August 17
  - Eric Drummond, 16th Earl of Perth, British politician, first Secretary-General of the League of Nations (d. 1951)
  - Henri Winkelman, Dutch general (d. 1952)
- August 25 – Eglantyne Jebb, English champion of children's human rights, co-founder of the Save the Children Fund (d. 1928)
- August 29 – Kim Ku, Korean politician (d. 1949)
- September 1 – Harriet Shaw Weaver, English political activist (d. 1961)
- September 5 – Wilhelm Ritter von Leeb, German field marshal (d. 1956)
- September 6 – John Macleod, Scottish-born physician and physiologist, Nobel Prize laureate (d. 1935)
- September 7 – Francesco Buhagiar, 2nd Prime Minister of Malta (d. 1934)
- September 13 – Sherwood Anderson, American writer (d. 1941)
- September 15 – Bruno Walter, German conductor (d. 1962)
- September 16 – Marvin Hart, American boxer (d. 1931)
- September 18 – James Scullin, 9th Prime Minister of Australia (d. 1953)
- September 22 – André Tardieu, 3-time prime minister of France (d. 1945)
- September 23 – Brudenell White, Australian general (d. 1940)
- September 26 – Edith Abbott, American social worker, educator and author (d. 1957)
- September 29 – Charlie Llewellyn, first non-white South African Test cricketer (d. 1964)

=== October–December ===
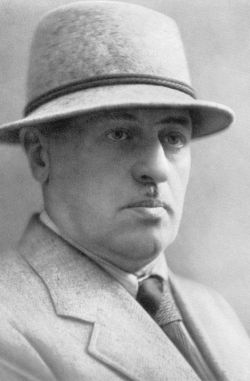
Karl Leopold von Möller

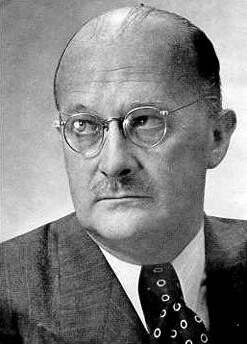
Adolf Windaus

- October 7 – Louis Tancred, South African cricketer (d. 1934)
- October 9 – Sol Plaatje, South African political activist (d. 1932)
- October 11 – Karl Leopold von Möller, German officer, journalist, author and politician (d. 1943)
- October 13 – Rube Waddell, American baseball player (d. 1914)
- October 21 – Sir Fraser Russell, South African-born Governor of Southern Rhodesia (d. 1952)
- October 26 – H. B. Warner, English stage, screen actor (d. 1958)
- October 29 – Anton Boisen, American founder of the clinical pastoral education movement (d. 1965)
- November 2 – Alfred S. Alschuler, American architect (d. 1940)
- November 3 – Rupert D'Oyly Carte, English hotelier, theatre owner and impresario (d. 1948)
- November 7
  - Culbert Olson, Governor of California (d. 1962)
  - Charlie Townsend, English cricketer (d. 1958)
- November 9 – Richard Thornton Fisher, American forester and educator (d. 1934)
- November 13 – William N. Andrews, American politician and member of the United States House of Representatives from 1919 to 1921 (d. 1937)
- November 17 – August Sander, German photographer (d. 1964)
- November 23 – Manuel de Falla, Spanish composer (d. 1946)
- November 24 – Walter Burley Griffin, American architect (d. 1937)
- December 9 – Berton Churchill, Canadian actor (d. 1940)
- December 12 – Alvin Kraenzlein, American athlete (d. 1928)
- December 21 – Jack Lang, Australian politician (d. 1975)
- December 25
  - Adolf Windaus, German chemist, Nobel Prize laureate (d. 1959)
  - Muhammad Ali Jinnah, founder, first governor general of Pakistan (official birthday; d. 1948)
- December 29
  - Pablo Casals, Catalan cellist (d. 1973)
  - Lionel Tertis, English violist (d. 1975)

=== Probable date ===
- Abd Allah Siraj, Prime Minister of Jordan (d. 1949)

== Deaths ==
=== January–June ===
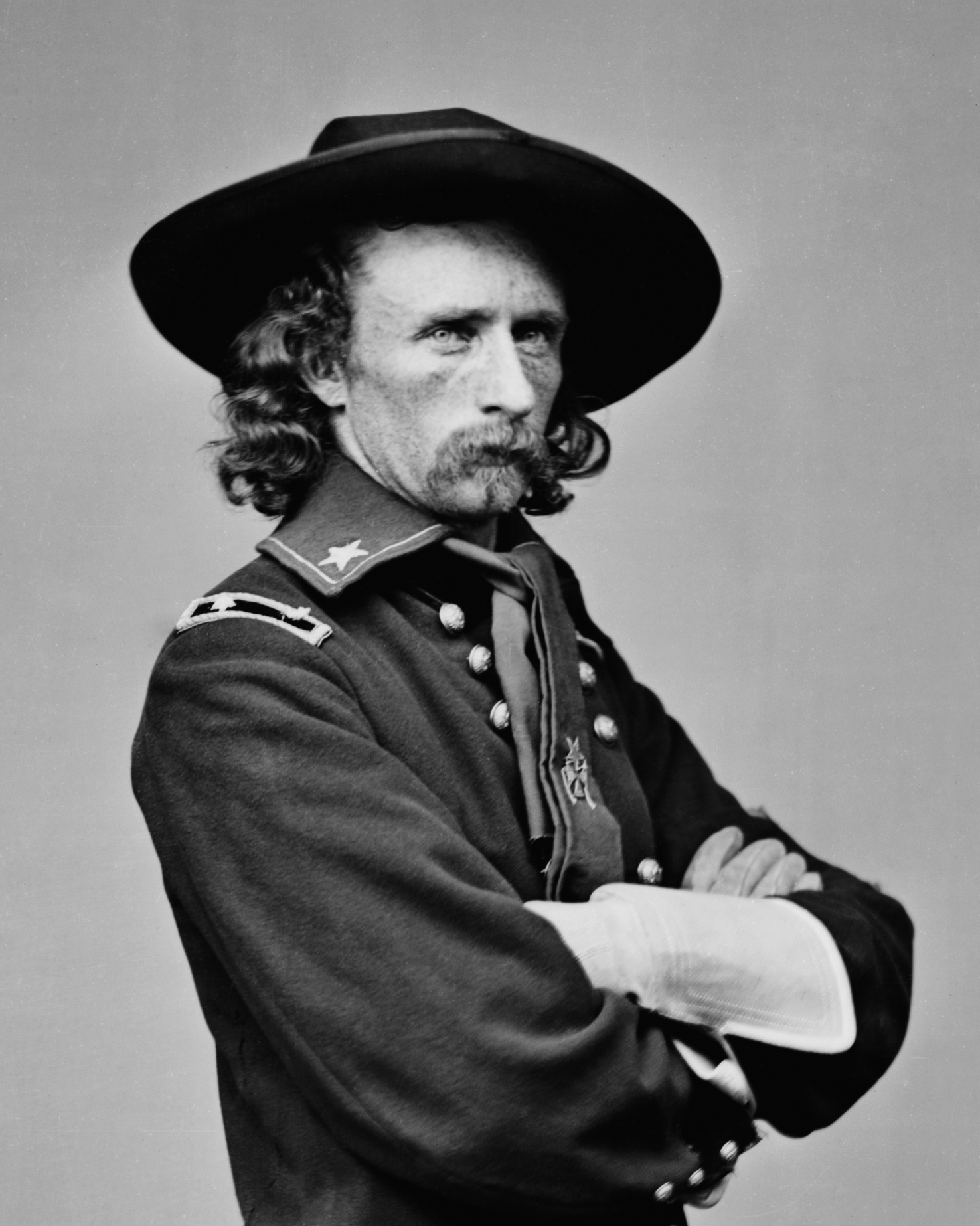
General George Armstrong Custer

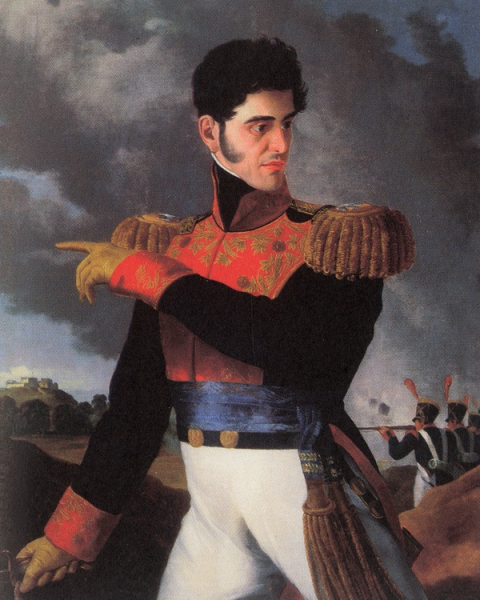
Antonio López de Santa Anna

- January 2 – Meta Heusser-Schweizer, Swiss poet (b. 1797)
- January 10 – Gordon Granger, American General (b. 1822)
- January 15 – Eliza McCardle Johnson, First Lady of the United States (b. 1810)
- February 10 – Reverdy Johnson, American politician (b. 1796)
- February 18 – Charlotte Cushman, American actress (b. 1816)
- February 24 – Joseph Jenkins Roberts, 2-time President of Liberia (b. 1809)
- March 29 – Karl Ferdinand Ranke, German educator (b. 1806)
- April 5 – Miguel Lobo y Malagamba, Spanish admiral (b. 1821)
- April 9 – Charles Goodyear, American politician (b. 1804)
- May 3 – Luis Francisco Benítez de Lugo y Benítez de Lugo (b. 1837)
- May 7 – William Buell Sprague, American clergyman, author (b. 1795)
- May 8 – Truganini, supposed last Tasmanian Aboriginal woman (b. c. 1812)
- May 24 – Henry Kingsley, English novelist (b. 1830)
- May 25 – Franz von John, Austrian general and politician (b. 1815)
- May 26 – František Palacký, Czech historian, politician (b. 1798)
- June 1 – Hristo Botev, Bulgarian revolutionary (b. 1848)
- June 4 – Abdülaziz, 32nd Sultan of the Ottoman Empire (b. 1830)
- June 6 – Auguste Casimir-Perier, French diplomat (b. 1811)
- June 7 – Josephine of Leuchtenberg, Queen of Sweden and Norway (b. 1807)
- June 8 – George Sand, French writer (b. 1804)
- June 20 – John Neal, American writer, critic and women's rights activist (b. 1793)
- June 21 – Antonio López de Santa Anna, 11-time President of Mexico (b. 1794)
- June 25 – George Armstrong Custer, U.S. Army general (killed in action) (b. 1839)
- June 27 – Harriet Martineau, British social theorist, writer (b. 1802)

=== July–December ===
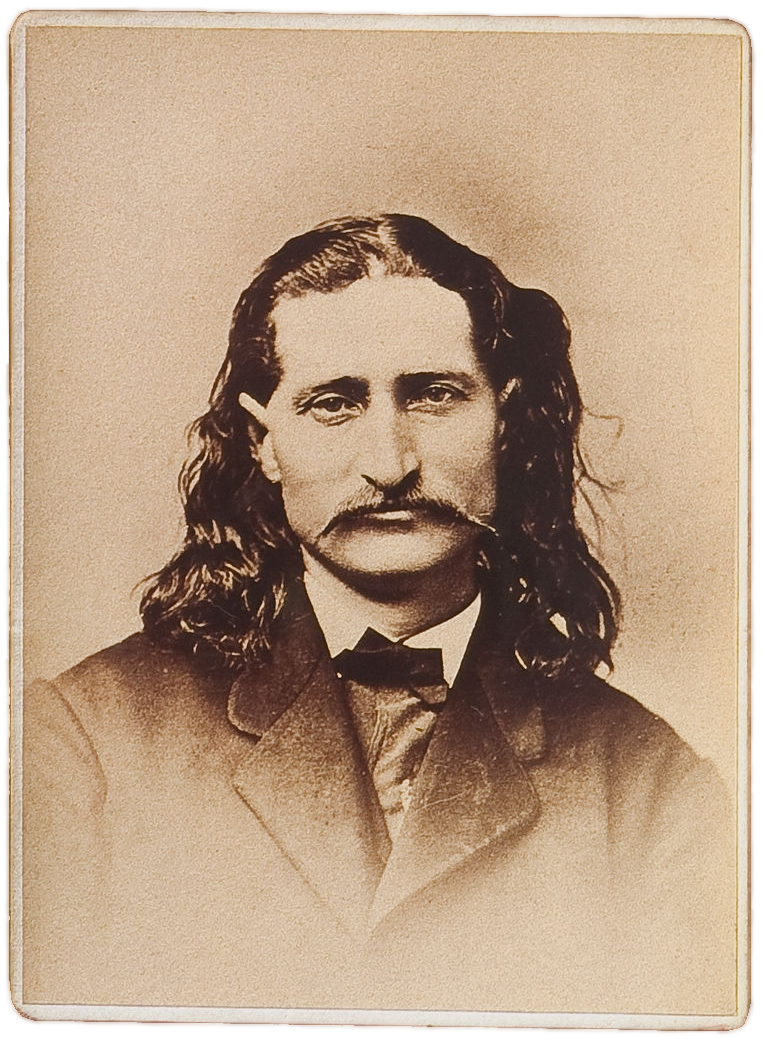
Wild Bill Hickok

- July 1
  - Mikhail Bakunin, Russian revolutionary, anarchist (b. 1814)
  - Wilhelm von Ramming, Austrian general (b. 1815)
- July 15 – Juan Pablo Duarte, Dominican revolutionary and political activist.
- August 2 – Wild Bill Hickok, American gunfighter, entertainer (b. 1837)
- September 5 – Manuel Blanco Encalada, Spanish-Chilean admiral and politician, 1st President of Chile (b. 1790)
- September 7 – Nicolás Patiño Sosa, Venezuelan military man (b. 1825)
- September 10 – John Ireland Howe, American inventor (b. 1793)
- September 27 – Braxton Bragg, American Confederate Civil War general (b. 1817)
- October 1 – James Lick, American land baron (b. 1796)
- November 16 – Karl Ernst von Baer, Estonian-German scientist, explorer (b. 1792)
- November 18 – Narcisse Virgilio Díaz, French painter (b. 1807)
- December 29 – Titus Salt, English woollen manufacturer, philanthropist (b. 1803)
- December 31 – Catherine Labouré, French visionary, saint (b. 1806)

=== Date unknown ===
- Anna Volkova, Russian chemist (b. 1800)
