= Laurel Hill Presbyterian Church (Dunbar, Pennsylvania) =

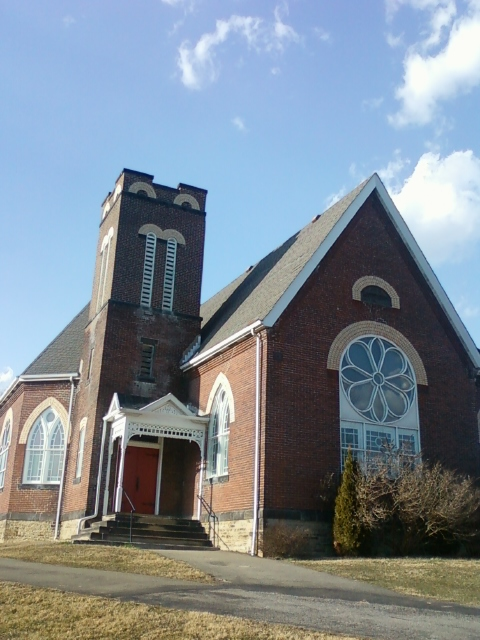
- Laurel Hill Presbyterian Church during the summer of 2012

- Location within Pennsylvania
- 39°58′35″N 79°41′58″W
- Location: 327 Laurel Hill Road, Dunbar, Pennsylvania
- Country: USA
- Denomination: Presbyterian

Architecture
- Completed: 1772, 1898

Laurel Hill Presbyterian Church is a Presbyterian church in Dunbar, Pennsylvania. One of the first Presbyterian churches west of the Allegheny Mountains, it was founded in 1772 along with its sister churches Tyrone, Middle, Sewickley, and United Presbyterian Churches. The original church was a simple log structure and was built by Scotch-Irish immigrants.

As the congregation grew, the church was rebuilt in 1782, 1852, and most recently, 1898.

The church is within the Presbytery of Redstone, a Presbytery of the Presbyterian Church U.S.A.

== History ==
The Laurel Hill Presbyterian Church was established in 1772. In 1790, the Reverend James Dunlap introduced Isaac Watts’ hymns to the congregation and included the hymns in his services at the church. However, many individuals within the congregation were unhappy with the end of exclusive psalmody and formed a separate congregation, the now defunct Laurel Hill Associate Reformed Presbyterian Church, nearby.

The windows in the church are antiques and were imported from England. An earlier church building, constructed during the 1780s, had a beeswax coating on the windows.

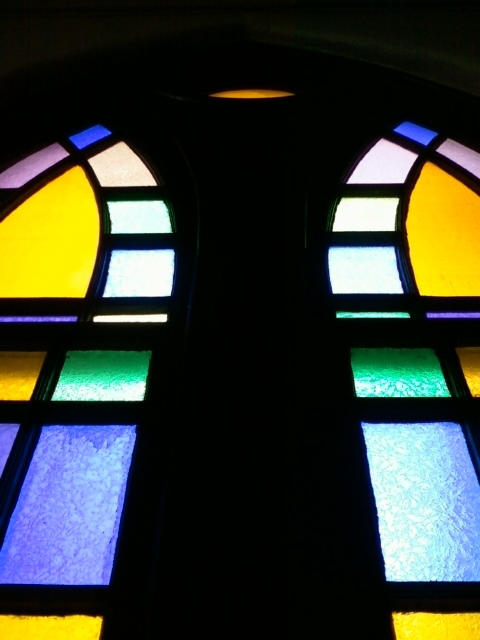
The stained glass windows in the sanctuary are over 110 years old and were imported from England.

William A. Clark, later a United States senator from Montana, attended Laurel Hill Academy, a private school run by the church in the middle of the 19th century. His father, John Clark, served as an elder in the church before the Clark family moved to Iowa in 1856.

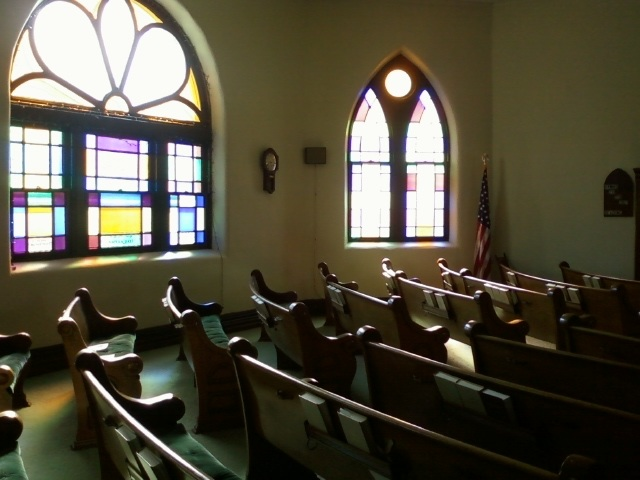
Sanctuary interior

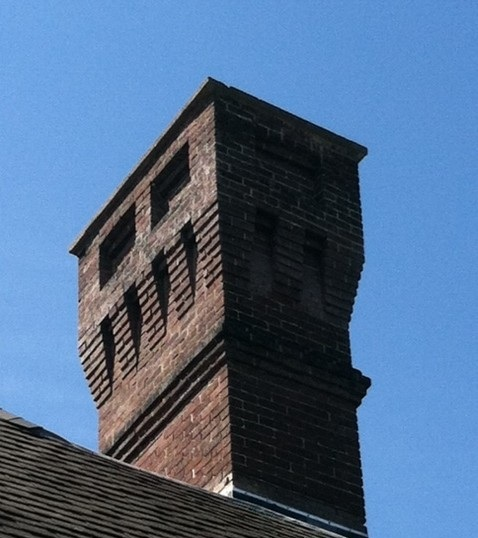
Ornate chimney

The church was featured, along with several other historically significant Southwestern Pennsylvania Presbyterian churches, in an exhibit at the Heinz History Center in Pittsburgh, Pennsylvania during the summer of 2012.

In 2012, the Laurel Hill Presbyterian Church celebrated its 240th anniversary. The congregation is working to have the church building added to the National Register of Historic Places.

== Cemetery ==
The Laurel Hill Cemetery covers seven acres and is the final resting place of French and Indian War, American Revolutionary War, and American Civil War, veterans. Many of the graves nearest the church date to the 18th century and belong to some of the earliest European residents of the area. There are a few graves belonging to Native Americans throughout. The cemetery also includes the graves of unidentified Fayette County residents who died in a smallpox epidemic around 1900.

=== Notable burials ===
- James Finley – first American granted a patent for a suspension bridge
