= 1876 in rail transport =

This article lists events related to rail transport that occurred in 1876.

== Events ==
=== January events ===
- January 1 – The Bristol and Exeter Railway, in England, is amalgamated into the Great Western Railway.

=== February events ===
- February 1 – The South Devon Railway, in England, is amalgamated into the Great Western Railway.
- February 5 – The Wiesentalbahn, which eventually becomes part of the Grand Duchy of Baden State Railway, opens between Schopfheim and Zell im Wiesental.

=== March events ===
- March 1 – The Atchison, Topeka & Santa Fe Railroad reaches Pueblo, Colorado.

=== April events ===
- April 1
  - Great Northern Railway (Ireland) formed by a merger of the Irish North Western Railway, Northern Railway of Ireland and the Ulster Railway.
  - Orenstein & Koppel established in Berlin as mechanical engineers, coming to specialize in railway equipment.

=== May events ===
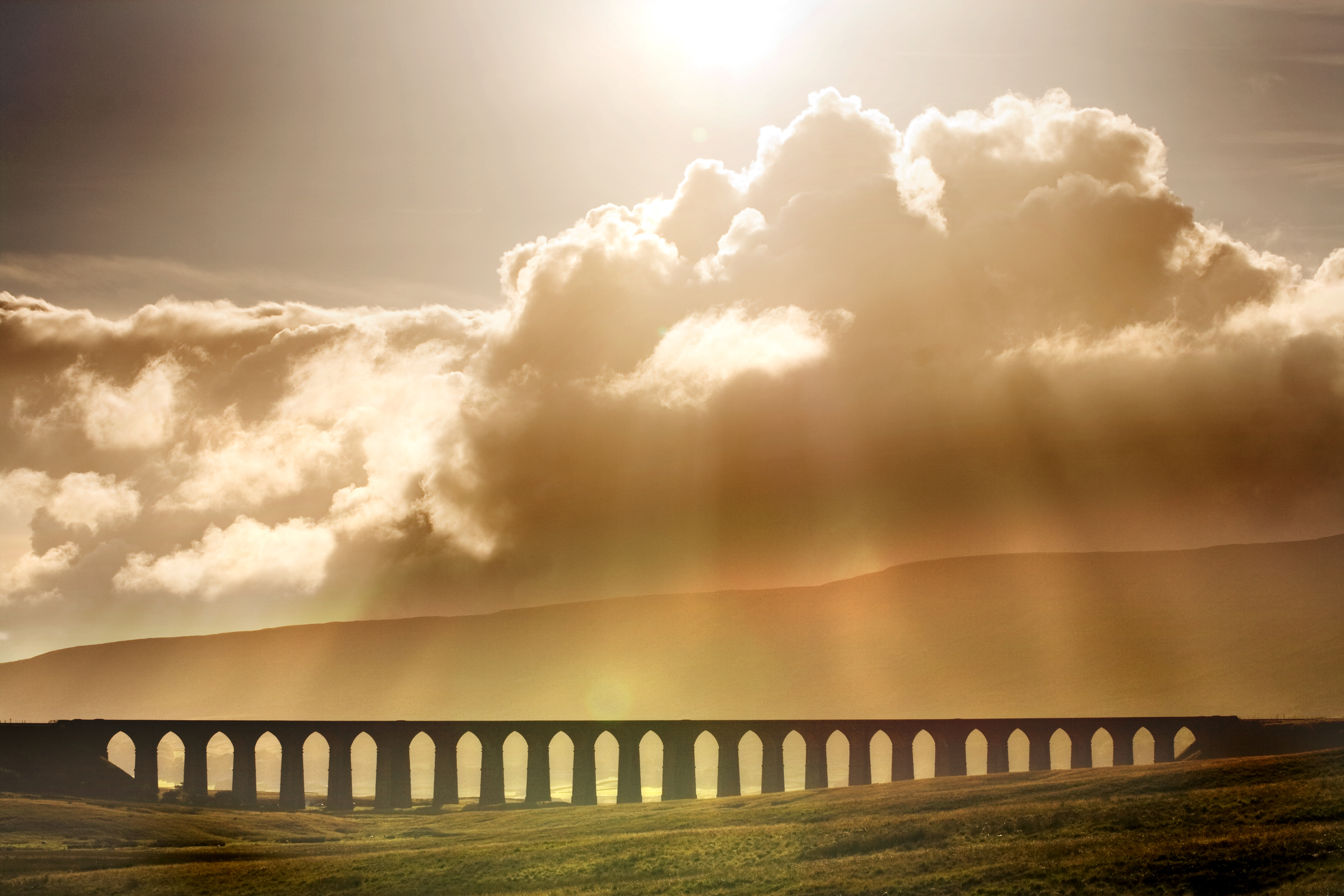
Ribblehead Viaduct, Settle–Carlisle line

- May 1 – The Midland Railway's Settle–Carlisle line in England is opened to passenger traffic.

=== June events ===
- June 4 – The Transcontinental Express arrives in San Francisco 83 hours after departing New York City.
- June 20 – Passenger train service begins on the Cornwall Minerals Railway between Fowey and Newquay.

=== July events ===
- July 3 – The first railroad in China, the partially completed Woosung Road, begins operation, connecting north Shanghai with Jiangwan. The 2 ft 6 in (762 mm)-gauge line has been built by American and British interests.

=== August events ===
- August 3 – The Woosung Road runs over and kills a Chinese soldier on the tracks. The British Consular Court will find the driver David Banks innocent of manslaughter, but the ensuing public outcry pressures both sides towards a Chinese purchase of the line.

=== September events ===
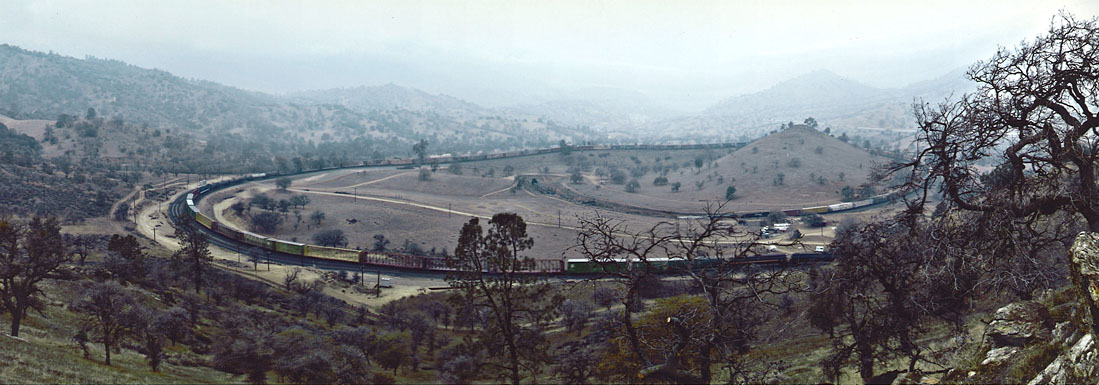
Panorama of Tehachapi Loop

- September 1 – The official groundbreaking ceremony for the Miami Valley Railway is held in Cincinnati, Ohio.
- September 5 – The first through train from San Francisco, California, arrives in Los Angeles, California, after traveling over the Southern Pacific's newly completed Tehachapi Loop.

=== October events ===
- October 16 – The Miami Valley Narrow Gauge Railway officially changes its name to Miami Valley Railway.
- October 24 – The British minister Thomas Wade and the Chinese viceroy Shen Baozhen sign "The Articles of Purchasing the Woosung Railway", which commits the Chinese to providing the railway's owners Tls. 285,000 in three installments over the course of the next year, after which they would acquire complete ownership and management of the line.

=== November events ===
- November 26 – The Ihrhove–Nieuweschans railway opens.

=== December events ===
- December 1 – The Woosung Road opens for traffic along the complete line between north Shanghai and Wusong.
- December 4 – The Compagnie Internationale des Wagons-Lits is founded in Brussels.

=== Unknown date events ===
- The Atjeh Staats Spoorwegen, a narrow-gauge railway on Sumatra in the Dutch East Indies, opens between Banda Aceh and its port of Ulèë Lheuë.
- The first regularly operated compound locomotives, a series of small 2-cylinder compound 0-4-2 tanks, are built to the design of Anatole Mallet by Schneider of Le Creusot for the Bayonne–Biarritz Railway, France.
- Classification yard opens at Mülheim-Speldorf in Germany.
- Ohio Falls Car Manufacturing Company, later to become part of American Car & Foundry, is founded in Jeffersonville, Indiana.

== Accidents ==
- January 21 – The Abbots Ripton rail accident on the Great Northern Railway (England) kills 13 and injures 53. The accident occurs after a blizzard has reduced visibility and disrupted the signaling system, causing the Special Scotch Express to collide with a coal train and an express train travelling in the other direction to run into the wreckage.
- December 29 – Ashtabula River railroad disaster: Lake Shore & Michigan Southern Railway Train No. 5, The Pacific Express, collapses the Ashtabula River bridge at Ashtabula, Ohio, dropping eleven passenger cars into a fire started by the car stoves. Of the 159 people on board, 92 are killed and 64 injured, the worst train disaster in the United States until 1918.

== Births ==
=== April births ===
- April 24 – Yury Lomonosov, Russian-born locomotive engineer (d. 1952).

=== May births ===
- May 27 – William Stanier, Chief mechanical engineer of the London, Midland & Scottish Railway 1932–1944 (d. 1965).

=== June births ===
- June 19 – Nigel Gresley, Chief mechanical engineer of the London & North Eastern Railway 1923–1941 (d. 1941).

== Deaths ==
=== June deaths ===
- June 2 – Charles Beyer, German-British steam locomotive manufacturer, co-founder of Beyer, Peacock & Company (born 1813).
