= Andrew Wylie (judge) =

American judge (1814–1905)

- 1887 portrait of Wylie by Henry Ulke

Associate Justice of the Supreme Court of the District of Columbia
- In office March 18, 1863 – May 1, 1885
- Appointed by: Abraham Lincoln
- Preceded by: Seat established by 12 Stat. 762
- Succeeded by: William Matthews Merrick

Personal details
- Born: Andrew Wylie; February 25, 1814 Canonsburg, Pennsylvania, U.S.
- Died: August 1, 1905 (aged 91) Washington, D.C., U.S.
- Resting place: Oak Hill Cemetery; Washington, D.C., U.S.
- Party: Republican
- Spouse: Mary Caroline (Bryan) Wylie (m. 1845-1896, her death)
- Parents: Andrew Wylie Sr. (father); Margaret (Ritchie) Wylie (1791-1859) (mother)
- Education: Transylvania University; Indiana University Bloomington
- Profession: Attorney

Andrew Wylie Jr. (February 25, 1814 – August 1, 1905) was an associate justice of the Supreme Court of the District of Columbia.

== Education and career ==
Wylie was born February 25, 1814, in Canonsburg, Pennsylvania, Wylie was the eldest son of Andrew Wylie (the first president of Indiana University) and Margaret Wylie (née Ritchie). His maternal grandfather was Craig Ritchie, a Scottish-American immigrant pioneer and Pennsylvania state lawmaker. Her maternal uncles included David Ritchie (a Pittsburgh city councilman, U.S. congressman, and judge).

Wylie attended Transylvania University and Indiana University Bloomington, graduating from the latter in 1832. He studied law with Walter Forward, and was admitted to the bar in 1837. He practiced in Pittsburgh, Pennsylvania, from 1837 to 1848, serving at some point on the Pittsburgh City Council and acting in 1845 as Pittsburgh city attorney. In 1845, Wylie married Caroline Bryan, the daughter of Daniel Bryan. Together they had four sons, only one of whom (Horace) survived to adulthood. His wife was maternally a member of the esteemed Barbour family of Virginia. In 1848, he moved his practice to Alexandria, Virginia where his wife had grown up.

Wylie and his wife would reside in Alexandria until the outbreak of the American Civil War. Both the Wylie and Bryan families opposed secession, and remained unionists during the war. Amid the war, he moved to Washington, D.C., and had his wife move to Pennsylvania for safety. His wife's sister and brother-in-law (Mariana and Jedediah Hyde Lathrop) also moved their family to Pennsylvania, while father remained in Alexandria. After moving Washington, D.C. circa 1861, he practiced law there until 1863.

== Federal judgeship ==
Wylie was nominated by President Abraham Lincoln to the Supreme Court of the District of Columbia on March 10, 1863, and was confirmed by the Senate on March 12, 1863. However, the Senate voted to reconsider the confirmation on March 13, 1863, with no subsequent Senate vote. His nomination expired on March 14, 1863, with the sine die adjournment of the special session of the 38th United States Congress.

Wylie received a recess appointment from President Lincoln on March 18, 1863, to the Supreme Court of the District of Columbia (now the United States District Court for the District of Columbia), to a new associate justice seat authorized by 12 Stat. 762. He was nominated to the same position by President Lincoln on January 5, 1864. He was confirmed by the United States Senate on January 20, 1864, and received his commission the same day. His service ended after his retirement on May 1, 1885.

== Later career and death ==
Following his retirement from the federal bench, Wylie resumed private practice in Washington, D.C., from 1885 to 1905.

In 1868, his wife gave birth to their son Horace, their only child who would live into adulthood. Horace would remain a resident of Washington, D.C. for many years, and he and his first wife (Katharine Virginia Hopkins, with whom he has six children) became fixtures of the city's social scene. Horace would abandon D.C. and his family there to elope with Elinor Hoyt Hichborn. He would live to be a nonagenarian, dying in the year 1960.

Judge Wylie died on August 1, 1905, in Washington, D.C. He was buried at Oak Hill Cemetery.

== Sources ==
Legal offices
Preceded by Seat established by 12 Stat. 762	Associate Justice of the Supreme Court of the District of Columbia; 1863–1885	Succeeded by William Matthews Merrick
