= Andrew Wylie (college president) =

American academic & theologian (1789–1851)

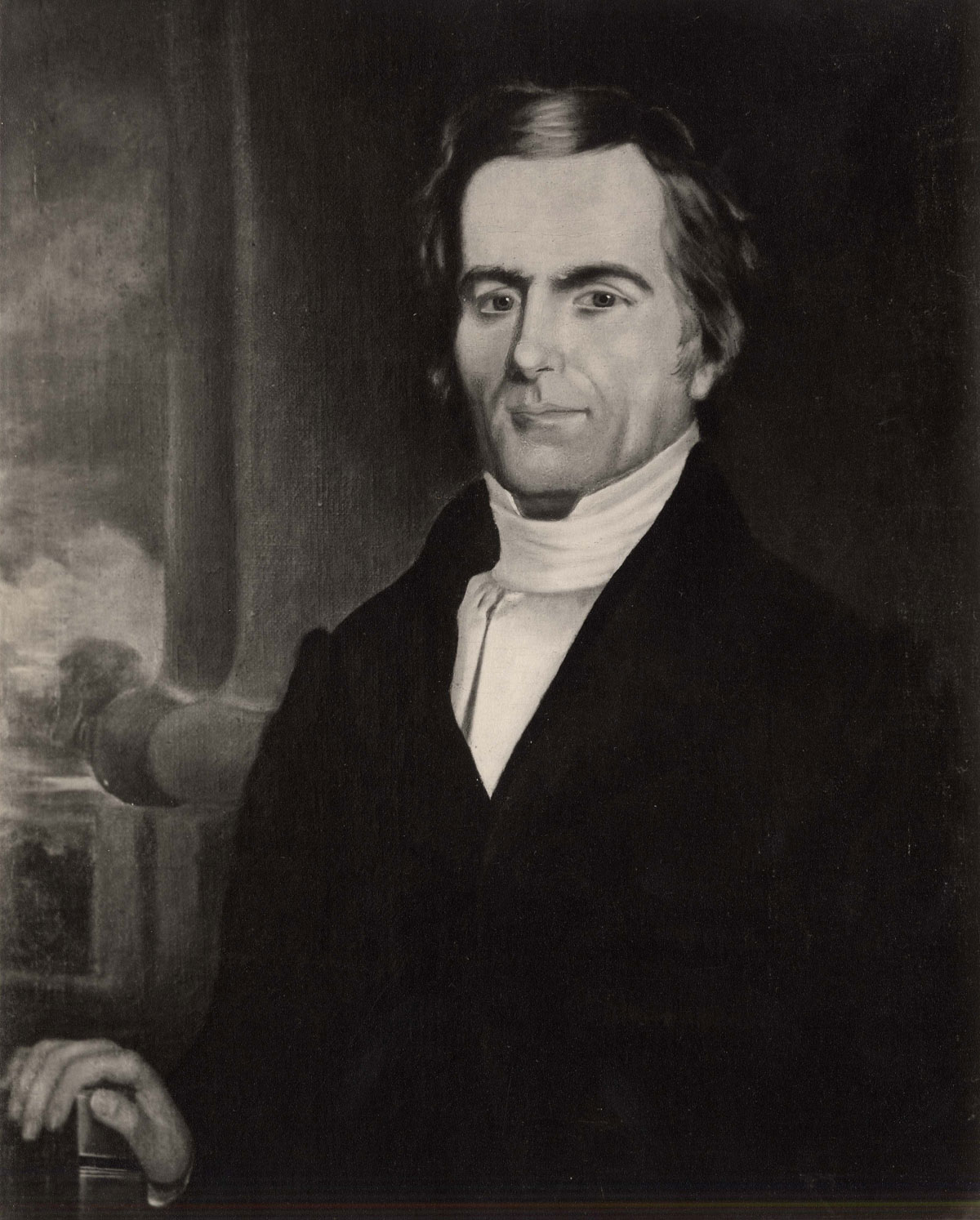

1st President of Indiana University
- In office 1829–1851
- Succeeded by: Alfred Ryors

3rd President of Jefferson College
- In office 1811–1816
- Preceded by: James Dunlap
- Succeeded by: William McMillan

2nd President of Washington College
- In office 1817–1828
- Preceded by: Matthew Brown
- Succeeded by: David Elliott

Personal details
- Born: April 12, 1789 Washington County, Pennsylvania
- Died: November 11, 1851 (aged 62) Bloomington, Indiana
- Resting place: Rose Hill Cemetery, Bloomington
- Spouse: Margaret Ritchie (m. 1813)
- Children: 12 (including Andrew Jr.)
- Education: Jefferson College
- Profession: College educator and Protestant clergyman

Academic work
- Discipline: Moral philosophy, mental philosophy, rhetoric, theology
- Institutions: Jefferson College; Washington College; Indiana University

Ecclesiastical career
- Church: Presbyterian (1813–1841); Episcopalian (1841–1851)
- Ordained: 1813 (Presbyterian); 1842 (Episcopalian)

Andrew Wylie (April 12, 1789 – November 11, 1851) was an American academic and theologian, who was president of Jefferson College (1811–1816) and Washington College (1816–1828) before becoming the first president of Indiana University (1829–1851).

== Early life and education ==
The son of Adam Wylie, a Presbyterian immigrant of Scottish descent from County Antrim, Ireland and farmer in Fayette County, Pennsylvania, Andrew was educated at home and in local schools in Washington County, Pennsylvania. In 1804, at age fifteen, Wylie entered Jefferson College, in Canonsburg, Pennsylvania. He graduated with honors in 1810 and was immediately appointed a tutor at the college.

== President of Jefferson and Washington Colleges ==
The next year, in 1811, Wylie was elected unanimously to serve as president of Jefferson College. He was licensed to preach in 1812, and in 1813 was ordained as a Presbyterian minister. In 1813 he married Margaret Ritchie, daughter of Craig Richie, a wealthy Canonsburg merchant.

Wylie was elected a member of the American Antiquarian Society in 1815.

While president of Jefferson College, Wylie led a controversial effort to merge with nearby Washington College. When that effort failed, in 1816 Wylie moved on to become president of Washington College and pastor of the Presbyterian church. In 1825 Wylie was given an honorary Doctorate of Divinity from Union College, in Schenectady, New York. Wylie resigned his presidency in 1828, over a theological dispute among local Presbyterian groups in Washington, Pennsylvania.

He was close friends with William Holmes McGuffey, who lived in Wylie's house for a time; they often would walk the 3 miles to Washington College together.

He was one of the original members of the Presbytery of Washington (in Pennsylvania), which was founded on October 19, 1819.

== President of Indiana University ==
In 1828, the trustees of the newly formed Indiana College wrote to Wylie offering him the position of president. Wylie accepted and began in the fall of 1829. There he joined two other faculty members, Baynard Rush Hall who taught Ancient Greek and Latin, and John Hopkins Harney who taught mathematics, natural philosophy, mechanical philosophy and chemistry. In addition to serving as president, Wylie taught classes in moral philosophy, mental philosophy, rhetoric, evidences of Christianity, belles lettres, and the Constitution of the United States. When he arrived at Indiana College the total enrollment was 40 students. Additionally, he found local schools lacking and established a preparatory department in the college. Several students from Washington College followed Wylie to complete their degrees at Indiana College.

In 1837 he recruited his half-cousin Theophilus Adam Wylie to Indiana College to teach mathematics, natural philosophy and chemistry.

He guided the school through an important time of transition as the state legislature rechartered the college as Indiana University in 1838.

In 1842, Wylie established the law department at Indiana University, which became the School of Law in 1889.

In Bloomington, Wylie continued to have conflicts with Presbyterians over Calvinist theology. In 1841, he left the Presbyterian Church to become a deacon in the Protestant Episcopal Church, and became an ordained priest in 1842.

Wylie died in office in 1851, after complications from a wood-chopping accident. He is buried in Rose Hill Cemetery in Bloomington, Indiana.

During his time as president at Indiana University, student enrollment increased from 40 to 74 enrolled in the college, 58 in the preparatory department, and 28 in the law department.

Wylie's Bloomington, Indiana home, is preserved as the Wylie House Museum by Indiana University and is administered by the IU Libraries.

== Children ==
Wylie and his wife Margaret (who was born in 1791 and died in 1859) had twelve children: Andrew Jr., William, Mary Ann, Craig Ritchie, Elizabeth, John Hosea, Samuel, Margaret, Irene Catherine, Redick McKee, Anderson McElroy, Jane Melheme.

== Works ==
- Wylie, D.D., Andrew (June 1833). Rev. S.C. Jennings (ed.). "Sermon XIV: The Nature of Faith". The Presbyterian Preacher. II (1). Pittsburgh: D. and M. MacLean: 193–208 – via Google Books.

Academic offices
Preceded by James Dunlap	President of Jefferson College; 1812 – 1816	Succeeded by William McMillan
Preceded by Matthew Brown	President of Washington College; 1817 – 1828	Succeeded by David Elliott
New office	President of Indiana University; 1829 – 1851	Succeeded by Alfred Ryors
