= Baynard Rush Hall =

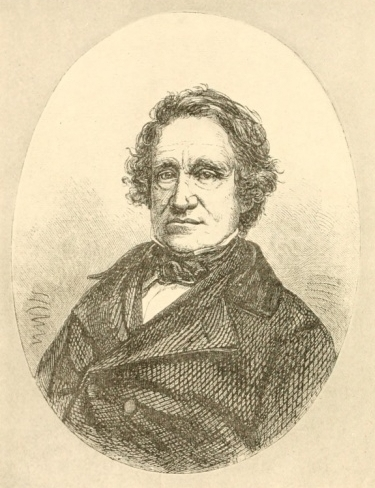
Hall's portrait, circa 1855

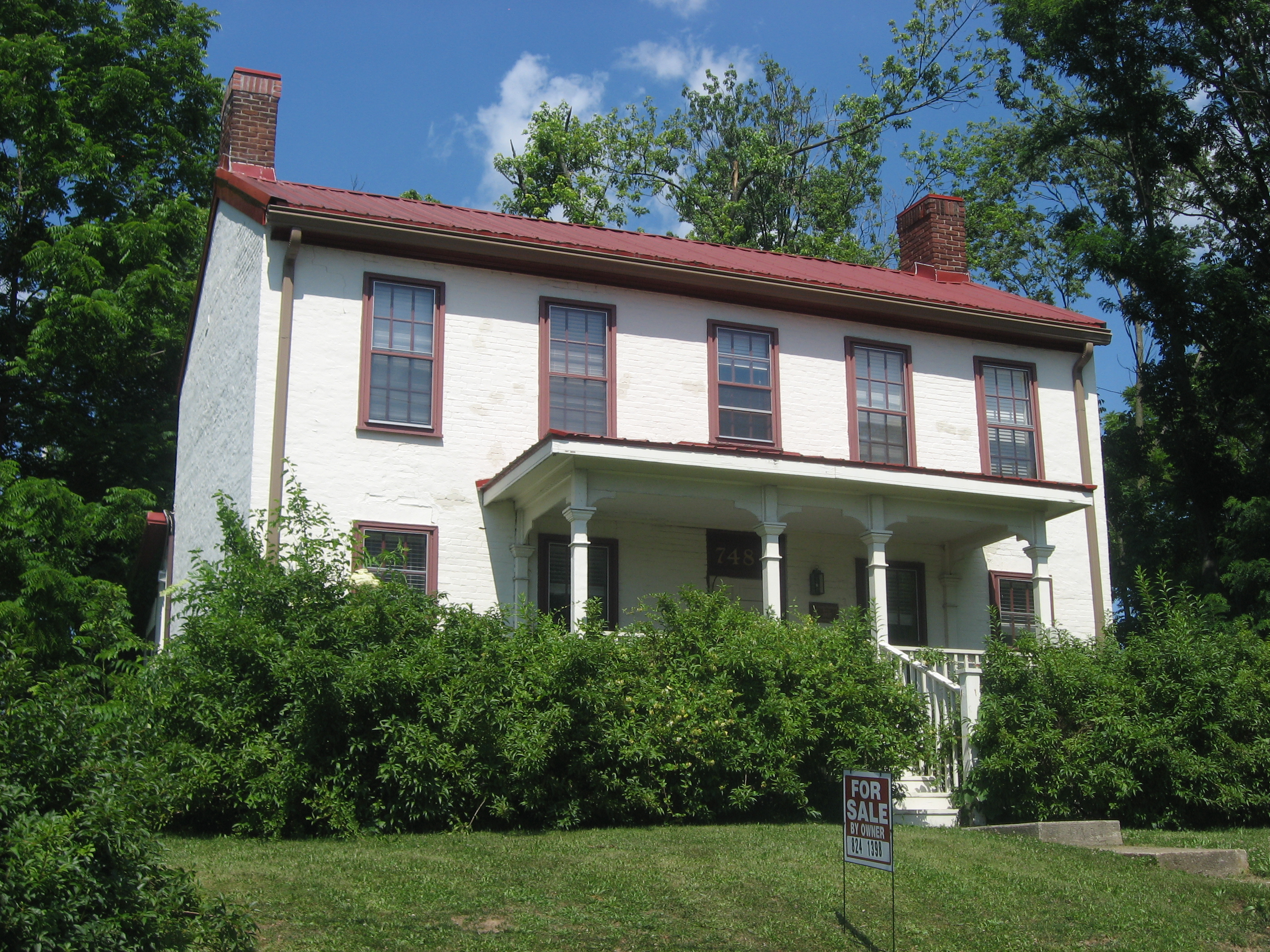
Hall's house in Bloomington

Hall's signature

Baynard Rush Hall (1793–1863) was an American academic and Christian minister. A native of Pennsylvania, he served churches and academic institutions in the East for most of his life. However, he was a resident of Indiana for several years, during which time he served as the first faculty member of what today is Indiana University.

== Biography ==
Born in Philadelphia in 1793, Hall was educated at Union College and Princeton Theological Seminary; after completing his studies at the seminary, he was ordained to the Presbyterian ministry. While working as a printer before entering Union, Hall had learned of opportunities in what was then the Western United States, and in 1823 he moved his family to southern Indiana. After spending a year living with relatives near Gosport and preaching occasionally, he was chosen to become the first teacher at the Indiana State Seminary in Bloomington, which was founded in 1820 but had not yet begun to operate. For two years beginning in 1825, Hall taught all of the classes, which consisted largely of Greek and Latin classes. In the first year, he taught twelve scholars and was paid a salary of $250, along with goods worth an additional $150 as compensation for occasional preaching in Presbyterian churches. Hall was firmly a classicist, teaching that the study of classical philosophy and languages formed the basis of the best education.

Between 1827 and 1829, the institution changed substantially, starting with the hiring of Kentucky resident John Hopkins Harney to teach the natural sciences and mathematics. The state legislature changed the name from "Indiana State Seminary" to "Indiana College" in 1828, and one year later it hired Andrew Wylie of Washington College in Pennsylvania to be the first president. The ecclesiastical affiliations of the three men produced controversy among Bloomington residents: like Hall, Wylie was a Presbyterian minister, and Harney was a member of a Presbyterian church. Many locals complained that a single professor was sufficient for the institution, and when they learned of Harney's religious affiliation, a large number of non-Presbyterians angrily protested the trustees' choice. The choice of yet another Presbyterian as president sparked renewed charges of religious favoritism against the board of trustees, even though it was composed of members of six different denominations. Personal conflicts among the three faculty members soon led to Harney's dismissal and Hall's resignation; Hall moved back to the East, where he remained active as an educator and as a religious leader until his death.

Even excepting religious matters, Hall's time in Indiana was difficult. He saw himself as a "big-bug" and out of place as an educated Easterner in Indiana, where most people were illiterate; according to legend, he brought the first piano to Bloomington, and he saw himself as the first Indiana resident in the history of the world who understood Ancient Greek. In turn, local residents looked at the Seminary and its educated population with suspicion. Hall managed to form a positive relationship with at least one local resident, craftsman and blacksmith Austin Seward; writing about pioneer ways in Bloomington later in his life, Hall lavished praise on Seward's practical and artistic abilities. Ultimately, he was determined to make himself a Hoosier at heart.

After returning eastward, Hall published multiple books before his 1863 death. One of them, entitled The New Purchase, consisted of an account of pioneer life in Indiana. Despite confusion resulting from Hall's intentional fictionalization of many names and places, leading Indiana historian David Banta has called The New Purchase a better account of Indiana pioneer life than any other publication. Another was Frank Freeman's Barber Shop; published in 1852, it was written in response and opposition to Uncle Tom's Cabin.

Hall's house in Bloomington, built in 1835, still stands in the city's McDoel Gardens neighborhood, within which it is the oldest extant building.
