= Theophilus Adam Wylie =

American academic and minister (1810–1895)

Theophilus Adam Wylie (1810–1895) was a Presbyterian minister, college professor, and president pro tempore of Indiana University.

== Early life ==
Born in Philadelphia, Pennsylvania on October 8, 1810, Wylie was the son of Margaret Watson Wylie and Samuel Brown Wylie, Reformed Presbyterian minister and professor of languages at the University of Pennsylvania. His brother Theodorus W. J. Wylie was also a prominent Presbyterian minister in Philadelphia. Theophilus was educated at the English Academy, and at Wylie and Engles Academy before entering the University of Pennsylvania where he received a Bachelor of Arts and Master of Arts degrees in 1830. After graduating he became a teacher at the Academy of the University of Pennsylvania. Wylie entered the New Light Reformed Presbyterian Seminary, where his father was professor, and was licensed to preach in 1836.

== Academic career ==
In that same year he was offered a professorship at Indiana University, by his half-cousin Andrew Wylie who was then president of Indiana University. Wylie began as professor of Natural Philosophy and Chemistry at the opening of the May term in 1837. In 1852 Wylie accepted a position as professor at Miami University, in Oxford, Ohio which, by his own description, “was then in a flourishing state and looking up, while the Indiana University at the time was looking in the opposite direction.” Wylie returned to Indiana University two and a half years later, as Indiana was in the midst of recovering from the destruction of its main building by fire. He became professor of languages and then chair of Natural Philosophy. Wylie continued to teach as a professor until he was appointed as emeritus professor in 1886. He served in that capacity until his death in 1895.

During his career, Wylie received honorary Doctorates in Divinity from Miami University, Monmouth College, and Princeton College as well as an honorary Doctorate of Law from the University of Pennsylvania.

At various times Wylie taught Latin, Greek, chemistry, physics, and astronomy. He was also Indiana University's first librarian and served as president pro tem of the university in 1853 and 1859. In 1876 Theophilus installed the first telephone in the state of Indiana, built from plans sent to him from a professor at the University of Pennsylvania, that ran between his home and a college laboratory. He also had a keen artistic ability, and many of his drawing survive today. Additionally, Wylie began to experiment with photography soon after the daguerreotype process was invented in 1839, and held patents including ones for a galvanic cell battery.

Theophilus was said to be a very effective teacher, respected by his students. Speaking of him at the dedication of Kirkwood Hall on January 25, 1895, Isaac Jenkinson, then president of the Board of Trustees of the University, had this to say: "A man who has given his whole life's service to sustaining, perpetuating, and making useful the work of this University. He has labored with a zeal, and earnestness, and a devotedness which has brought him rich reward from the grateful hearts of hundreds of students, but which has left him poor indeed in other recompense."

A former student and colleague of Wylie, Amzi Atwater, remembered thus:

“A student who should have met Doctor Wylie on the street on those days – a man of small stature and weak voice and half diffident, unworldly manner certainly far from self-confidence – would hardly have been able rightly to estimate him. In order to do so, he would need to visit him in his rare old home and see him in the midst of his most interesting family and accept their generous hospitality. He would thus see him surrounded by every indication of old time learning and refinement such as few have enjoyed. He would see him in the midst of his boos, his pictures, his ancestral portraits and paintings and mementos of other times and scenes. Only this would he realize his hereditary touch with scholars, divines and great missionaries and the noble forces leading to the world’s advancement”

== Family life ==
On November 5, 1838, Wylie married Rebecca I. Dennis of Germantown, Pennsylvania. In 1859, following the death of Andrew Wylie's widow, Theophilus purchased their former home, and moved there with his family. Theophilus and Rebecca had eight children, six of whom lived to adulthood. Theophilus and Rebecca's children and grandchildren include:

- Elizabeth Louisa Wylie (1839–1930): Married Herman Balthasar Boisen; children Anton Theophilus Boisen, Marie Louisa Boisen
- Richard Dennis Wylie (1841–1861)
- Margaret Wylie (1843–1938): Married Arthur Calvin Mellette; children Theophilus Wylie Mellette, Charles Edmond Mellette, Arthur Anton Mellette, Joshua Theodore Richard Mellette
- Susan Emma Wylie (1846–1848)
- Samuel Brown Wylie (1848–1851)
- Theophilus Andrew Wylie (1852–1878)
- Samuel Brown Wylie (1854–1890): Married Sara Seabrook Mitchell; children Theophilus Andrew Wylie, Samuel Brown Wylie, Rebecca Wylie, Laurence Seabrook Wylie
- Theodorus William John Wylie (1857–1934): Married Fannie Thompson

Their home is now the Wylie House Museum operated by Indiana University Libraries to interpret the lives of both the Theophilus Wylie family and Andrew Wylie family who lived there.
