= John Watson (college president) =

First President of Jefferson College
- In office August 29, 1802 – November 30, 1802
- Succeeded by: James Dunlap

Personal details
- Born: 1771
- Died: November 30, 1802 (aged 30–31) Washington County, Pennsylvania
- Spouse: Margaret
- Education: Canonsburg Academy; College of New Jersey

John Watson was the first principal and president of and professor of moral philosophy at Jefferson College.

Watson, a native of Western Pennsylvania, was born in 1771 and was a student at Canonsburg Academy (later Jefferson College, now Washington & Jefferson College). He was a student of the school's founder, John McMillan, who was arranged for him to attend the College of New Jersey (now Princeton University), from where he graduated in 1797. Watson married McMillan's second daughter, Margaret. In his time, Watson was known as an accomplished Latin and Greek scholar. He was one of the founders of the Philo Literary Society at Jefferson College.

A frail and intense man, in sharp contrast with his mentor and father-in-law McMillan, Watson was elected to the Presidency of Jefferson College (now Washington & Jefferson College) on August 29, 1802. Watson died on November 30, 1802, only three months after his ascension to the presidency and 2 days after the first Jefferson College diplomas were awarded. McMillan carried out his duties until the election of James Dunlap as the second president of Jefferson College.

Academic offices
Preceded by Position created	President of Jefferson College; 1802	Succeeded by James Dunlap
