= David Elliott (college president) =

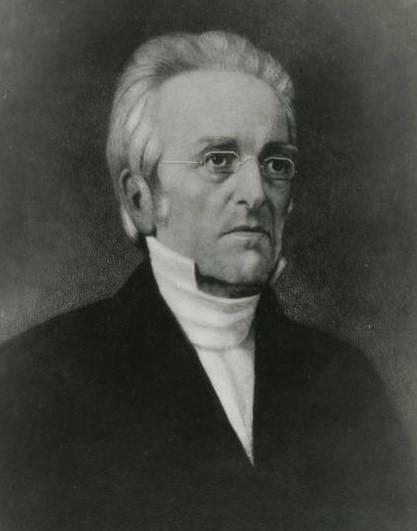
- Born: February 6, 1787; Sherman Valley, Pennsylvania
- Died: March 18, 1874 (aged 87); Allegheny, Pennsylvania
- Education: Dickinson College
- Church: Presbyterian

David Elliott was the third president of Washington College from 1830 to 1831.

Following the resignation of Andrew Wylie, Washington College was temporarily suspended in 1829 due to the difficulty in finding a candidate willing to accept the presidency, and several Trustees resigned from the Board. Elliot was appointed temporary president of Washington College on September 28, 1830. He received a Doctor of Divinity degree from Jefferson College in 1835, and Doctor of Laws degree from Washington College in 1847. From his resignation as president on November 7, 1831, until 1865, he was president of the Washington College Board of Trustees.

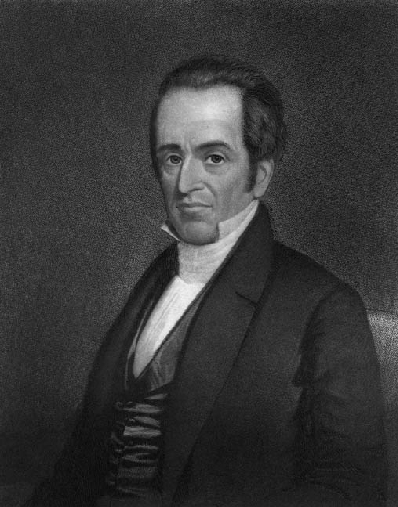
Elliot as a young man

Elliot died March 18, 1874, at the age of 88 years.

His grandson was academic John Livingston Lowes, a graduate of Washington & Jefferson College.

== Writings ==
- Elliott, David (1848). The Life of the Rev. Elisha Macurdy: With an Appendix, Containing Brief Notices of Various Deceased Ministers of the Presbyterian Church in Western Pennsylvania. Allegheny: Kennedy & Brother.

Academic offices
Preceded by Andrew Wylie	President of Washington College; 1830–1831	Succeeded by David McConaughy
Religious titles
Preceded by The Rev. John Witherspoon	Moderator of the 49th General Assembly of the Presbyterian Church in the United States of America; 1837–1838	Succeeded by The Rev. Wm. Swan Plumer (Old School); The Rev. Samuel Fisher (New School)
