= Samuel Fisher (clergyman) =

American clergyman and educator

Samuel Fisher (June 30, 1777 – 1856) was an American clergyman and educator.

His father, serving in the Continental Army at Morristown, New Jersey, died of disease just before his birth. His mother was living at the time with her brother-in-law, Dr. Samuel Ware, in Sunderland, Massachusetts. He lived for a few years with his mother in Dedham, Massachusetts, and in 1782 went to Conway, to live with his uncle, Dr. Ware, who had adopted him, and where he remained till he went to college. He studied at Williams College, graduating in 1799.

He taught school in Conway and then became head of Deerfield Academy in 1800. He was next a tutor at Williams College from 1801 to 1803, meanwhile studying divinity. He met his future wife Alice Cogswell in 1802 and they married in 1805. Her cousin of the same name was the inspiration for the founding of the first school for the deaf in the United States. Fisher and his wife had six children. She died in 1850.

He received a license to preach from the Berkshire Association in 1804 and was ordained as a pastor in Wilton, Connecticut. A series of pastorates in New York and New Jersey followed. Meanwhile, Fisher received a doctorate in divinity from Princeton University in 1827.

He became embroiled in the Old School-New School Controversy that divided the Presbyterian Church in the United States of America. He was elected the first moderator of the New School General Assembly at Philadelphia in 1838.

He died on December 27, 1856, in Succasunna, New Jersey, and was buried New Year's Day, 1857, in Paterson, New Jersey

His son, Samuel Ware Fisher, became president of Hamilton College.

Religious titles
Preceded by The Rev. David Elliott	Moderator of the 50th General Assembly of the Presbyterian Church in the United States of America (New School); 1838–1839	Succeeded by The Rev. Baxter Dickinson
