= Anton Boisen =

American chaplain (1876–1965)

- Born: October 29, 1876; Bloomington, Indiana
- Died: October 1, 1965 (aged 88)
- Education: Indiana University, Yale University School of Forestry, Union Theological Seminary in the City of New York
- Occupations: Chaplain, Forester

Signature
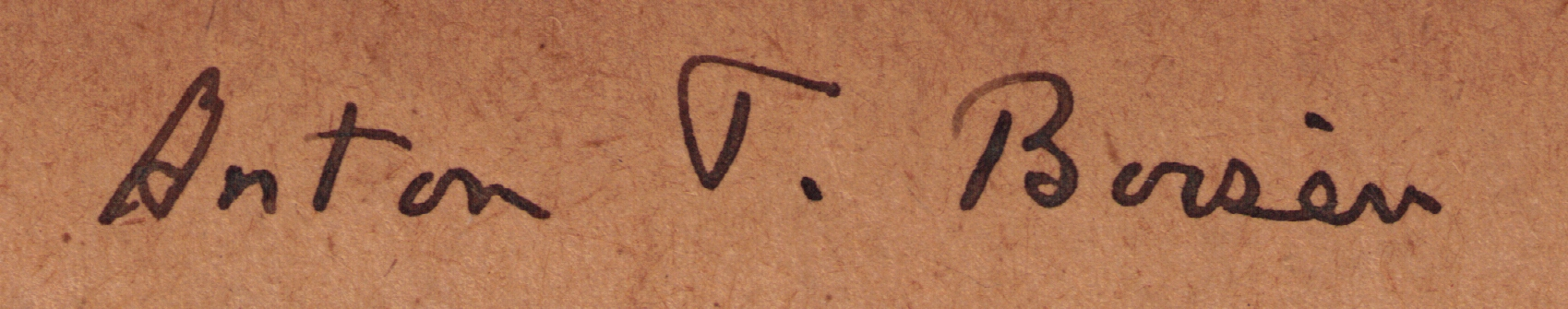

Anton Theophilus Boisen (29 October 1876 – 1 October 1965) was an American chaplain. He was a leading figure in the hospital chaplaincy and clinical pastoral education movements.

== History ==
Born in Bloomington, Indiana, Boisen was the son of Hermann Balthsar Boisen and Elisabeth Louisa (Louise) Wylie. Both his father and his maternal grandfather, Theophilus Adam Wylie from whom his middle name stemmed, were professors at Indiana University. When his father died in 1884, his family moved into Theophilus Wylie's home.

Boisen graduated from Indiana University in 1897 and taught French and German, first in high school then later as a tutor at the university. During this period he had the first of several major psychotic episodes he would experience. Recovering from it, Boisen went on to study forestry and graduate from the Yale University School of Forestry in 1905. He went on to work for the U.S. Forest Service for several years before having a second psychotic episode.

He entered the Union Theological Seminary in the City of New York and graduated in 1911. Boisen moved from the Presbyterian to the Congregational Church, and worked for the next ten years in rural church survey work, in pastorates in both Kansas and Maine. For two years during World War I, Boisen worked with the YMCA in Europe. In 1917, Boisen returned from Europe and experienced another breakdown, but recovered to accept an offer to join the Interchurch World Movement. As part of that work, he moved to North Dakota to conduct a rural survey.

When the Interchurch World Movement collapsed in 1920, Boisen again fell victim to psychosis, and his family had him hospitalized at Westborough State Hospital, where it took him fifteen months to recover. While at Westboro, Boisen experienced a religious calling to work to bring religion and medicine closer together.

After his release, Boisen began studies in the psychology of religion at Andover Theological Seminary where he remained from 1922 to 1924 working especially with the physician and ethicist Richard Cabot. In 1924 William Bryan of the Worcester State Hospital invited Boisen to become a hospital chaplain, and the following year he began a program at the hospital for the clinical training of theological students.

Also during this period, Boisen began a five-year stint lecturing each fall quarter to students in the social ethics department of Chicago Theological Seminary. Boisen's ideas about mental illness began to mature during this period. He explored the concept that mental illness represents a crisis brought about by the failure to grow into higher social loyalties, including loyalty to God. In this way mental illness was purposive, he believed, and could be cured by the power of religion.

In 1930 he joined with others in forming the Council for the Clinical Training of Theological Students, which would expose students for extended periods to people with illness and crisis, mainly in mental hospitals. In the same year, however, the death of his mother helped to precipitate still another brief period of mental illness. This breakdown caused Cabot to withdraw his support for Boisen as chaplain at Worcester State Hospital and Boisen influence in the council to wane.

In 1932 Boisen became chaplain at Elgin State Hospital near Chicago to be closer to Chicago Theological Seminary and to Alice Batchelder, a love interest who worked in Chicago. While there Boisen organized a Chicago Council for the Clinical Training of Theological Students, functioning effectively until he learned in 1935 Alice Batchelder was dying of cancer. The discovery resulted in his brief hospitalization in Baltimore, Maryland, but in December 1935 he returned to his chaplaincy post at Elgin where he remained as chaplain until 1954, then chaplain emeritus at Elgin until his death.

== Views ==
Boisen believed that some mental illnesses, such as schizophrenia, could be interpreted as one's attempts to solve "problems of the soul". Later, he explored the concept that mental illness represents a crisis brought about by the failure to grow into higher social loyalties, including loyalty to God. In this way mental illness was purposive, he believed, and could be cured by the power of religion.

== Published works ==
In 1936 he published his ideas about religion and mental health in Exploration of the Inner World, which he dedicated to Batchelder. The book was praised by the New York Times Review of Books as being a "significant contribution to the religious literature field." Boisen continued to expound his religious views in additional articles and books, notably Religion in Crisis and Custom (1955) and Out of the Depths (1960), his autobiography.
