= John Livingston Lowes =

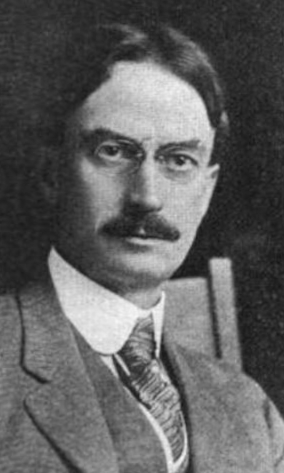
- Born: December 20, 1867; Decatur, Indiana, U.S.
- Died: August 15, 1945 (aged 77); Boston, Massachusetts, U.S.
- Education: Washington & Jefferson College; Harvard University; Balliol College, Oxford
- Occupation: Academic
- Employer(s): Washington University in St. Louis; Harvard University

John Livingston Lowes (December 20, 1867 – August 15, 1945) was an American scholar and critic of English literature, specializing in Samuel Taylor Coleridge and Geoffrey Chaucer.

== Life ==
John Livingston Lowes was born in Decatur, Indiana on December 20, 1867. He earned a B.A. from Washington & Jefferson College in 1888 and did postgraduate work in Germany and at Harvard University. He taught mathematics at Washington & Jefferson College until 1891 when he received his M.A.

From 1909 to 1918 he worked as an English professor at Washington University in St. Louis, where he also served as dean of Arts and Sciences at Washington University in St. Louis. From 1918 to 1939 he taught English at Harvard University. In 1919 he was the Lowell Institute lecturer and the author of Convention and Revolt in Poetry. His grandfather was David Elliott, who had served as President of Washington College.

Lowes was elected to the American Academy of Arts and Sciences in 1921 and the American Philosophical Society in 1934. He was the first Eastman Professor at the Balliol College, Oxford in 1930–31.

Lowes died in Boston, Massachusetts on August 15, 1945, aged 77.

== Works ==
=== Coleridge ===
Lowes' most famous work is The Road to Xanadu: A Study in the Ways of the Imagination (Houghton Mifflin, 1927), which examines the sources of Coleridge's The Rime of the Ancient Mariner and Kubla Khan. Using Coleridge's notebooks and other papers at the Bristol Library, Lowes put together a list of books that the poet read before and during the time he composed his poems. The trick was to connect images and ideas in the poems to images and ideas in Coleridge's reading. Though later critics have disputed both Lowes' findings and method, The Road to Xanadu, according to English author Toby Litt, is "a book of a lifetime": "Its argument, that Coleridge had one of the most extraordinary minds the world has ever seen, is there on every page"; it "is one of the books which helped me understand what writing is."

=== Chaucer ===
Lowes' book on Chaucer (1934), building on the work of George Lyman Kittredge, treats the poet not just as the "father of English poetry" but as, along with Shakespeare and Milton, English literature's greatest poet. The book greatly influenced E. Talbot Donaldson and other eminent mid-20th-century Chaucerians.

=== Critiques and other writings ===
- The Prologue to the Legend of Good Women Considered in Its Chronological Relations was published by Lowes in 1905
- Convention and Revolt in Poetry following up in 1919 with his major critique on Free Verse and poetry
- Of Reading Books - Four Essays followed in 1929 and
- Selected Poems of Amy Lowell as editor in 1928 with
- Essays in appreciation - first published in 1936 and
- A Leaf from the 1611 King James Bible in 1937
