= Sydney Spencer Sawrey-Cookson =

British colonial judge (1876–1933)

Sydney Spencer Sawrey-Cookson (5 August 1876 – 1 August 1933) was a British barrister and colonial judge who served in Africa and the Straits Settlements during the first half of the twentieth century.

== Early life and education ==
Sawrey-Cookson was born on 5 August 1876, the eighth son of James Cookson of Durham, who also took the name of Sawrey in compliance of the will of kinsman, John Sawrey. He was educated at Uppingham School and New College, Oxford where he received his BA in 1899. In 1903, he was called to the bar of the Inner Temple.

== Career ==
After joining the north-eastern circuit, Sawrey-Cookson went to North Borneo where he served as judicial commissioner from 1910 to 1920. In November 1920, he was appointed judge of the Supreme Court of Gambia, remaining in office until 1925. From June 1925 to 1933, he served as puisne judge of the Gold Coast Colony. In May 1933, he transferred to Penang where he took up the appointment as judge of the Supreme Court of the Straits Settlements.

He wrote a revised edition of the laws of North Borneo, and a revised edition of the ordinances of Gambia in 1926.

== Personal life and death ==
Sawrey-Cookson married Edith Turner, granddaughter of George Grey Turner, in 1910, and they had one son and two daughters.

He died suddenly on 1 August 1933 in Penang, at the age of 56.
