= Craig Ritchie =

Scottish psychiatrist and researcher

- Born: Aberdeen, Scotland
- Education: University of Aberdeen; University College London (UCL)
- Known for: European Prevention of Alzheimer's Dementia (EPAD); PREVENT Dementia Programme; Brain Health Scotland
- Scientific career
- Fields: Psychiatry, Neurodegeneration, Epidemiology, Brain Health
- Workplaces: University of St Andrews; Scottish Brain Sciences; University of Edinburgh (former); Imperial College London (former)
- Website: Scottish Brain Sciences

Craig Ritchie is a Scottish professor of psychiatry specialising in the early diagnosis and treatment of Alzheimer's disease. He is the founder and chief executive officer of Scottish Brain Sciences and Professor of Brain Health and Neurodegenerative Disease at the University of St Andrews.

Ritchie has argued for detecting Alzheimer's disease in midlife, decades before the onset of dementia symptoms, an approach he has termed "brain health". He previously held the Chair in Psychiatry of Ageing at the University of Edinburgh and was the inaugural Director of Brain Health Scotland, a government-funded dementia prevention initiative.

== Early life and education ==
Ritchie was born in Aberdeen, Scotland. He attended Aberdeen Grammar School before studying at the University of Aberdeen, graduating with a Bachelor of Medicine, Bachelor of Surgery (MBChB) in 1991.

== Early career ==
Between 1997 and 2000, Ritchie worked as a researcher in Melbourne, Australia, in a laboratory run by Professor Colin Masters at the University of Melbourne, focusing on drug discovery for Alzheimer's disease. He returned to the United Kingdom in 2000 and completed an MSc in Epidemiology and, between 2002 and 2006, a PhD in Mental Health at University College London, funded by a Medical Research Council Health Services Research Fellowship.

== Clinical and academic career ==
In 2007, Ritchie was appointed Senior Lecturer in Old Age Psychiatry at Imperial College London, where he also held several NHS and research-network leadership roles between 2010 and 2014, including Research and Development Director at West London Mental Health Trust and Deputy Director of the London Northwest National Institute for Health and Care Research (NIHR) Clinical Research Network.

In October 2014, Ritchie returned to Scotland to take up the Chair in Psychiatry of Ageing at the University of Edinburgh, where he established the Centre for Dementia Prevention in 2015. He was elected Chair of the Scottish Dementia Research Consortium from 2017 to 2022 and Associate Director of the Edinburgh Wellcome Trust Clinical Research Facility from 2016 to 2022. He is currently Professor of Brain Health and Neurodegenerative Disease at the University of St Andrews.

=== Brain Health Scotland ===
In March 2020, Ritchie became the inaugural Director of Brain Health Scotland, a government-sponsored programme led by Alzheimer Scotland that works to reduce dementia risk across the life course. In this role, he advocated for a distinct national brain health strategy focused on public health, risk reduction and early detection, alongside existing dementia care strategies.

=== Scottish Brain Sciences ===
In 2022, Ritchie founded Scottish Brain Sciences, a company that runs clinical trials and research into diagnostics and therapeutics for neurodegenerative disease, opening its first clinical research centre in Edinburgh. In May 2023, after 33 years working as a psychiatrist in NHS Scotland, he resigned, citing frustration with the infrastructure available to deliver new Alzheimer's treatments and stating that patients faced waits of up to 18 months for diagnosis.

His resignation was raised in the Scottish Parliament during First Minister's Questions, where MSP Claire Baker asked for the Scottish Government's response; First Minister Humza Yousaf said the government shared Ritchie's ambition to improve dementia care and took his criticisms seriously.

Ritchie then became full-time CEO of Scottish Brain Sciences, which operates a "triple helix" model connecting life-sciences companies, universities and the health sector. In August 2023, BBC News reported on the company's partnership with Roche Diagnostics to develop a blood test for earlier detection of Alzheimer's disease. In November 2025, Scotland's Deputy First Minister Kate Forbes attended the opening of a new Scottish Brain Sciences research centre at the ONE BioHub in Aberdeen.

=== Research roles and projects ===
- European Prevention of Alzheimer's Dementia (EPAD): From 2015 to 2020, Ritchie led the EPAD Consortium, a €64 million Innovative Medicines Initiative-funded project that built a longitudinal cohort of over 2,000 participants as a trial-readiness platform.
- PREVENT Dementia Programme: Ritchie is Chief Investigator of PREVENT, a multi-centre cohort study examining midlife (ages 40–59) risk factors for dementia.

=== Media ===
Ritchie has appeared in national media discussing dementia prevention and NHS dementia care. He was interviewed by The Sunday Times about his NHS resignation in May 2023 and about dementia research in February 2024. He was interviewed by Michael Mosley for the BBC Two programme Trust Me, I'm a Doctor in 2015, and featured in the BBC Scotland documentary Sally Magnusson: Alzheimer's, a Cure and Me in 2024.

=== Selected publications ===
- Ritchie, C.W., et al. (2016). "Development of interventions for the secondary prevention of Alzheimer's dementia: the European Prevention of Alzheimer's Dementia (EPAD) project." The Lancet Psychiatry.
- Ritchie, C.W., et al. (2024). "The PREVENT dementia programme: baseline demographic, lifestyle, imaging and cognitive data from a midlife cohort study investigating risk factors for dementia." Brain Communications.
- Laurell, A.A.S., et al. (2025). "Hypothalamic volume, sleep, and APOE genotype in cognitively healthy adults." Alzheimer's & Dementia.
- Ritchie, C.W., Trepel, D., et al. (2025). "The impact of mild cognitive impairment on healthcare utilization and costs: A UK Biobank study." Alzheimer's & Dementia: Diagnosis, Assessment & Disease Monitoring.
