= Nicolás Patiño Sosa =

Venezuelan military man

Nicolás Patiño Sosa (c. 1825 – September 7, 1876) was a Venezuelan military man who participated in the Federal War.
