= Wylie House =

Historic house in Indiana, United States

- Andrew Wylie House
- U.S. National Register of Historic Places
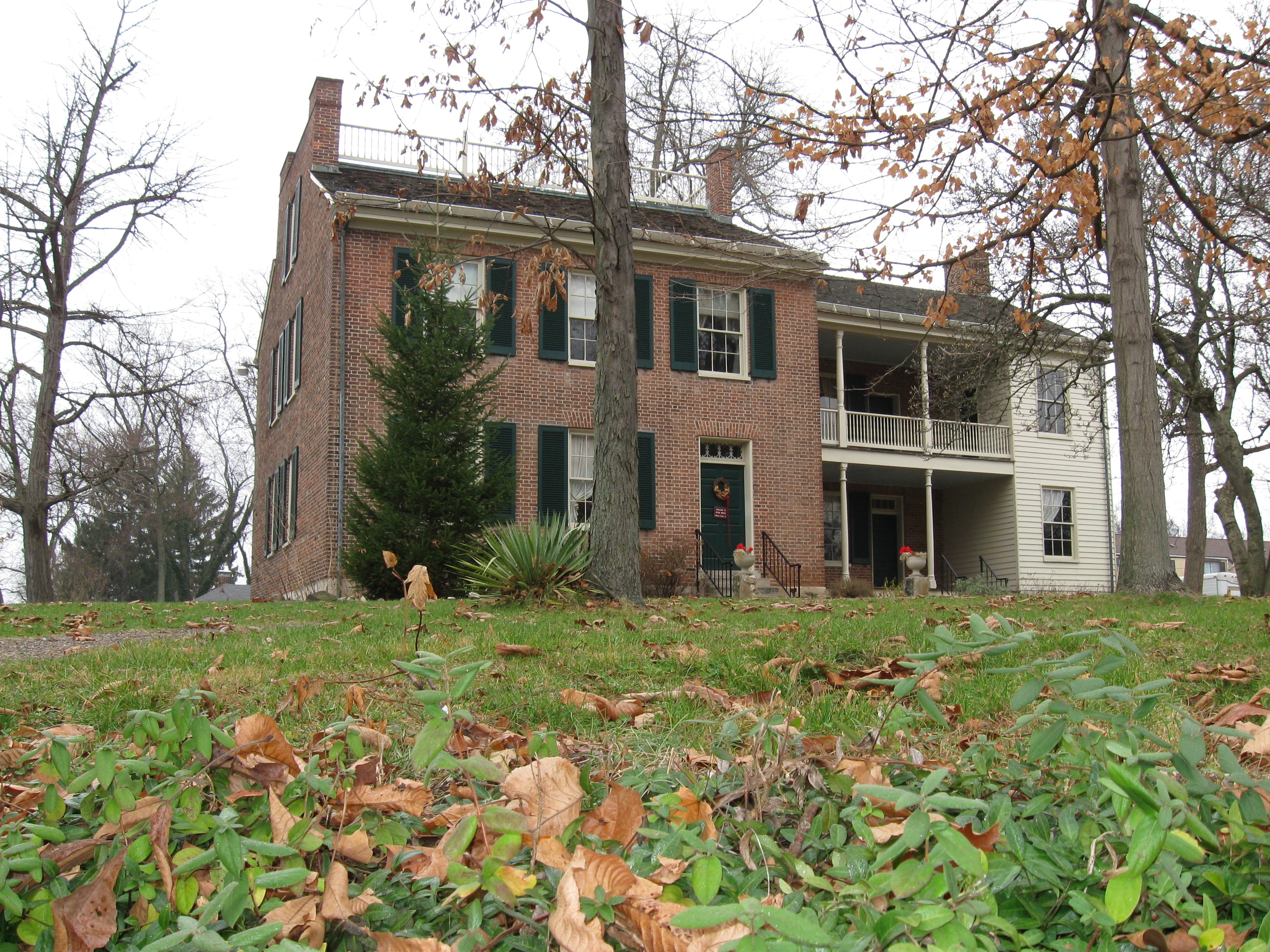
- Wylie House

- Location within Indiana Location within the United States
- Location: 307 E. 2nd St., Bloomington, Indiana
- Coordinates: 39°9′42″N 86°31′50″W
- Area: 0.1 acres (0.040 ha)
- Built: 1835
- Architectural style: Federal
- NRHP reference No.: 77000013
- Added to NRHP: April 18, 1977

Wylie House is a historic structure built in 1835 and located in Bloomington, Indiana. It was home of Andrew Wylie, first president of Indiana University, until his death in 1851. In 1859, following the death of Andrew's widow Margaret, Theophilus Adam Wylie, professor at Indiana University and half-cousin to Andrew, purchased the house from their heirs and his family resided there until his widow's death in 1913. Today Wylie House is operated as an historic house museum by Indiana University Libraries to interpret the lives of these families.

== 1835 - 1859: Andrew Wylie family period ==
In transitioning from the "State Seminary" to Indiana College in 1828 the state legislature sought to hire a college president. They offered the position to Andrew Wylie, then president of Washington College (now Washington & Jefferson College) in western Pennsylvania, who accepted. In 1829 Wylie arrived in Bloomington, Indiana with his wife, Margaret Ritchie, and their children. Wylie became the first president and third faculty member of the newly renamed Indiana College. (In 1838 the name changed again to Indiana University. It was also sometimes referred to as Indiana State University in the mid-nineteenth century.) For the first several years the family resided in rental properties. In 1835 Andrew Wylie built a house on a 20-acre (81,000 m^{2}) tract of land near the college that he had purchased in 1829 and 1830. Andrew, Margaret and ten of their twelve children lived in the house, in various numbers from 1835 to 1859.

The house itself is a two-story brick structure, with a Flemish bond facade. Atypical for buildings of the 1830s, the house is a blend of Georgian and Federal styles. This style may have seemed old fashioned compared to the contemporary Greek Revival style that was becoming fashionable at the time of construction. One explanation of this architectural choice relates to the area from which the Wylies arrived. Southwestern Pennsylvania was culturally influenced by northern Virginia, an area that continued to be dominated by Georgian architecture. Further, Wylie designed his house based on Manchester house, a home in Washington County, Pennsylvania, which in turn recreates the builder's original house in Newport, Rhode Island. The widow's walk present in Wylie's house is evidence of this connection.

The house was the center of a 20-acre (81,000 m^{2}) farmstead, and as such was surrounded by numerous outbuildings. According to a memory map made by a Wylie descendant in 1954, these included a smoke house, double-pen barn, an elaborate log chicken house, a carriage house and a two-story utility building. The outbuildings reflect the various activities undertaken in and around this house - butchering, smoking and salting meats, gathering wood for winter months, preserving foods, laundering clothes and so on. It is notable that hired servants were difficult to find and often unreliable in frontier towns such as Bloomington in the 1830s and 1840s. As a result, most of this work was undertaken by the Wylie household themselves.

== 1859 - 1913: Theophilus Adam Wylie family period ==
In 1837 President Wylie invited Theophilus Adam Wylie, his half-cousin, to teach mathematics, natural philosophy, and chemistry at Indiana College. In 1838 Theophilus married Rebecca Dennis of Germantown, PA and brought his bride to Bloomington. They lived in a series of rental houses until 1859, when following the death of Andrew's widow, Theophilus purchased the house and 5 of the 20 acres (81,000 m^{2}) from their heirs. Theophilus Wylie's household was often quite large, with six of his eight children growing up in the house (two died in early childhood prior to 1859), and several extended family members living with or taking extended visits to the home over the rest of the century.

During this period, the character of Bloomington had begun to change from a frontier settlement to a burgeoning college town. In addition to family, the Wylies took in two boarders at a time, either students or young professors from the college. Likewise servants, absent from the house during the Andrew Wylie period, formed a part of the household during the Theophilus Adam Wylie period. Among them was Lizzie Breckinridge, an African American woman and daughter of a former slave, who came to work and live with the family in 1856 at the age of thirteen. Breckinridge stayed in this position until at her death in 1910.

The house was the site of several scientific and technological advancements. Theophilus began to experiment with photography soon after the daguerreotype process was invented in 1839, many of the photographs he took at the house survive today. He often used a telescope for celestial observations from the roof of the house. And in 1876 Theophilus installed the first telephone in state of Indiana, built from plans sent to him from a professor at the University of Pennsylvania, that ran between the house and a college laboratory. Theophilus was an active faculty member at Indiana University until 1886. In that year he became an emeritus professor in which capacity he served until his death in 1895. Rebecca Wylie continued to live in the house until her death in 1913.

== Wylie House Museum ==
Dr. Amos Hershey, a professor of political science at Indiana University, bought the house from the Wylie heirs in 1915. While he and his wife Lillian lived there, they undertook the first significant changes to the building. In addition to modernizing the kitchen and bathrooms and adding a furnace, they enclosed the second story porch, removed the ground floor pantries and screened in the front porch on the first floor. They also added pediment awnings over the front door and a small slanting roof over the east door to the kitchen.

In 1947 Herman B Wells, then president of Indiana University, helped the university acquire the house from Dr. Hershey's widow, who continued to live there until 1951. Between 1951 and 1959 the house was home to Indiana University Press. Then in the period between 1960 and 1965, major restorations of the house were conducted aimed at bringing it back to its original configuration. In attempting to remove all features added to the house since its construction, the restoration removed at least one feature now believed to be original to the house, a small back porch.

Today, known as Wylie House Museum, the building is a historic house museum that presents the house as it would have looked prior to 1860. With an inventory from 1859 as a guide it is furnished with a combination of Wylie family heirlooms and period pieces.
