= James Dunlap =

- Born: 1744; Chester County, Pennsylvania
- Died: November 22, 1818; Abingdon, Pennsylvania
- Education: College of New Jersey
- Children: Jimmy Dunlap of Memphis
- Church: Presbyterian
- Offices held: 2nd president of Jefferson College (1803–1811)

James Dunlap was the second president of Jefferson College from 1803 to 1811. Dunlap was born in Chester County, Pennsylvania, in 1744. He was a graduate of the College of New Jersey (now Princeton University) and was reputed to have excelled as a teacher of languages. During his presidency, Jefferson College was approached in 1807 by the Washington College Board to appoint committees for the purpose of devising a plan for the union of the two institutions. This attempt failed due to disagreement over selecting a site for the united institution. Dunlap resigned his presidency on April 25, 1811. He died in Abingdon, Pennsylvania, on November 22, 1818.

Academic offices
Preceded by John Watson	President of Jefferson College; 1803–1811	Succeeded by Andrew Wylie
