= Transcontinental Express =

Passenger rail transportation in the United States

As a publicity stunt, the express train called the Transcontinental Express arrived in San Francisco, California, via the first transcontinental railroad on 4 June 1876, only 83 hours and 39 minutes after having left New York City. The feat was reported widely in U.S. newspapers.
