= John Hopkins Harney =

American politician

John H. Harney

Member of the Kentucky House of Representatives from Jefferson County
- In office August 5, 1861 – August 3, 1863
- Preceded by: Samuel L. Geiger; David Meriwether
- Succeeded by: William M. Allen

Personal details
- Party: Union Democratic

John Hopkins Harney (February 20, 1806 – January 26, 1868) was a Kentucky legislator native of Bourbon County, Kentucky. He was a distant cousin of General William Selby Harney.

Harney was orphaned at an early age, leaving him in dire economic circumstances that forced him to educate himself instead of attending school. And, he began working on a land surveying crew. At the age of seventeen, he successfully solved a problem on one of their surveying expeditions which attracted so much attention that he was soon made principal of an academy in Paris, Kentucky.

After saving up money from his teaching position, Harney was able to purchase a scholarship to Miami University in Oxford, Ohio, where he graduated in 1827 with a degree in belles lettres and theology. He was immediately thereafter appointed a professor of mathematics at Indiana University.

In 1833, Professor Harney transferred to the math department at Hanover College in Indiana, where he began preparing an algebra textbook. He put the final touches on this project after being named president of Louisville College in Kentucky in 1839. Published in 1840, it was the first such book ever written by an American.

When Louisville College closed in 1843, Harney began publication of the Louisville Democrat, which he continued to edit for the rest of his life. He was elected to the local school board in 1850, and afterward became its president and established many reforms.

During the U.S. Civil War, Harney served in the Kentucky legislature as chairman of the Committee on Federal Relations. When the state was invaded by Confederate forces, he drafted a famous resolution: "Resolved, that Kentucky expects the Confederate--or Tennessee--troops to be withdrawn from our soil unconditionally."

Beyond his legislative agenda during the war, Harney used his newspaper to protest arbitrary arrest and deportation of Kentucky residents by Federal authorities. He urged his fellow citizens not to support the Federal war effort with "another man or another dollar" until their liberties were assured. This led to his arrest. General Ambrose Burnside intervened and ordered Harney's release.

After the war, Harney urged the repeal of the severe laws enacted against self-expatriated Confederates, an ultimately successful campaign. But, in 1868, he did oppose the nomination of any former Confederates for high office on the grounds it might provoke arbitrary arrests by Federal officials still operating in Kentucky. He died soon thereafter.

Mr. Harney was married May 24, 1827, to Martha Rankin Wallace, a cousin of General Lew Wallace, and had seven children. Among his sons was the notable poet and journalist William Wallace Harney. Among his grandsons was ragtime innovator Ben Harney.
