= 1856 in literature =

This article contains information about the literary events and publications of 1856.

== Events ==
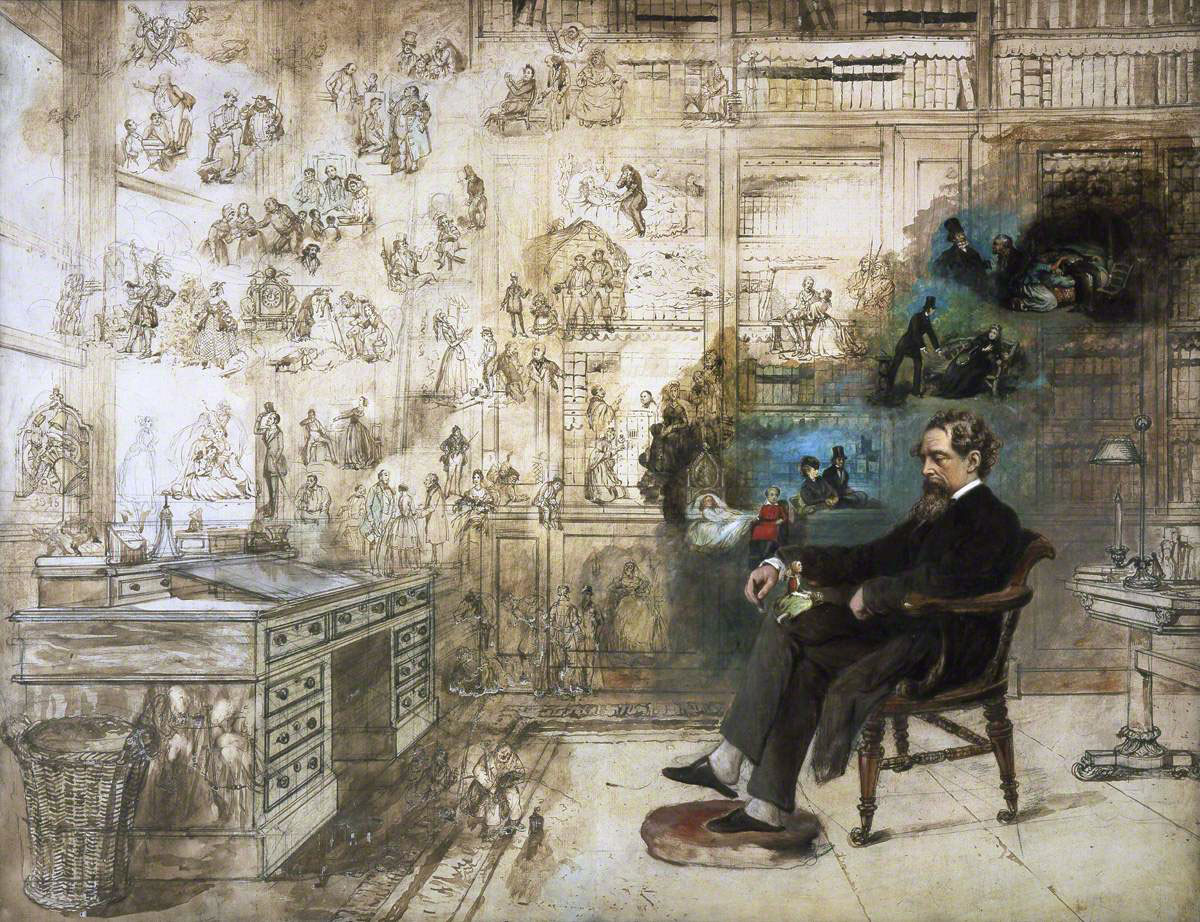
Dickens' Dream by Robert William Buss, portraying Charles Dickens at his desk at Gads Hill Place, surrounded by many of his characters

- January 1 – M. H. Gill, printer to Dublin University, purchases the publishing and bookselling business of James McGlashan, renaming it McGlashan & Gill, the predecessor of Gill & Macmillan.
- March – Charles Dickens buys Gads Hill Place in Kent (England) from fellow novelist Eliza Lynn.
- March 1 – Lewis Carroll chooses his pseudonym; on May 1 he takes up photography as a hobby.
- March 5 – The second Royal Opera House in Covent Garden, London, is destroyed by fire, as the first was in 1808.
- May – John Ruskin praises Henry Wallis's painting of The Death of Chatterton when it is exhibited in London; the young poet and novelist George Meredith modelled for the painting.
- July 19–26 – Wilkie Collins' "Anne Rodway", a story in diary form about a needlewoman and her fiancé investigating the murder of a friend, appears in Household Words, as the first English story to feature a woman as the main detective character.
- September 13 – Richard Francis Burton, while serving in the British Army in the Crimean War and engaged to Isabel Arundel, receives permission to set off on an expedition to the African Great Lakes.
- September 29 – English actor Henry Irving makes his stage début at Sunderland as Gaston, Duke of Orleans, in Bulwer Lytton's play Richelieu.
- October – Marian Evans, who has yet to adopt the pseudonym George Eliot, publishes an anonymous article, "Silly Novels by Lady Novelists", in the Westminster Review.
- October 1–December 15 – Gustave Flaubert's Madame Bovary: Mœurs de province receives an expurgated serialization in Revue de Paris.
- November 6 – The first of George Eliot's Scenes of Clerical Life and her first work of fiction, "The Sad Fortunes of the Reverend Amos Barton", is submitted to Blackwood's Edinburgh Magazine by G. H. Lewes for anonymous publication (which takes place in the issue dated January 1857).
- November 18 – English-born actress Laura Keene opens her own theatre in New York City.
- November 20 – Nathaniel Hawthorne and Herman Melville spend time together while Hawthorne is United States consul in Liverpool.
- unknown dates
  - Mikhail Katkov revives the title The Russian Messenger (Russian: Ру́сский ве́стник Russkiy vestnik, Pre-reform Russian: Русскій Вѣстникъ Russkiy Vestnik) for an influential literary magazine published in Moscow. In its first year he publishes Mikhail Saltykov-Shchedrin's Provincial Sketches (beginning in August, signed "N. Schedrin") and the text of Alexander Ostrovsky's play V chuzhom miru pohmelye ("Hangover at a Stranger's Feast"; premiered in Moscow on January 9).
  - Arthur Schopenhauer adds a chapter on "The Metaphysics of Sexual Love" to the third edition of his The World as Will and Representation.
  - Poet Juris Alunāns' Songs becomes the first significant published literary work in Latvian.
  - The English bookseller W. H. Smith first publishes the Baconian theory of Shakespeare authorship.
  - Alphonse Daudet begins his teaching career.

== New books ==
=== Fiction ===
- José de Alencar – Five Minutes (Cinco minutos)
- Fredrika Bremer – Hertha
- William M. Burwell – White Acre vs. Black Acre
- Sylvanus Cobb, Jr. – The Gunmaker of Moscow; or, Vladimir, the Monk (serialization in New York Ledger)
- Mrs. Craik – John Halifax, Gentleman
- Charles Dickens and others – The Wreck of the Golden Mary
- Gustave Flaubert – Madame Bovary (serialization)
- Caroline Lee Hentz – Ernest Linwood
- Geraldine Jewsbury – The Sorrows of Gentility
- Gottfried Keller – Die Leute von Seldwyla (The People of Seldwyla)
- "A Lady of New Orleans" – Tit for Tat
- Herman Melville
  - The Piazza Tales
  - I and My Chimney
- Eduard Mörike – Mozart auf der Reise nach Prag (Mozart on the Way to Prague, novella)
- Charles Reade – It Is Never Too Late to Mend
- George Sand
  - Lucrezia Floriani
  - La Mare au diable
- Harriet Beecher Stowe – Dred: A Tale of the Great Dismal Swamp
- Leo Tolstoy – Youth («Юность», Yunost')
- Ivan Turgenev – Rudin («Рудин»)
- Charlotte Mary Yonge – The Daisy Chain

=== Children and young people ===
- R. M. Ballantyne – The Young Fur-Traders
- Frances Browne – Granny's Wonderful Chair

=== Drama ===
- Sava Dobroplodni – Mihal the Mouse-Eater (first authorized theatrical production in Bulgaria)
- Colin Henry Hazlewood – Jessie Vere, or the Return of the Wanderer
- Henrik Ibsen – Olaf Liljekrans
- Gustav Räder – Robert und Bertram

=== Poetry ===
- Elizabeth Barrett Browning – Aurora Leigh
- Victor Hugo – Les Contemplations
- See also 1856 in poetry

=== Non-fiction ===
- Alphonse Louis Constant – Rituel de la haute magie
- Lord Dufferin – Letters From High Latitudes
- Alexander Kinloch Forbes – Rasmala
- J. A. Froude – History of England from the Fall of Wolsey to the Death of Elizabeth (begins publication)
- Washington Irving – The Life of George Washington, Volume 3
- Hermann Lotze – Mikrokosmos
- Henry Morley – Cornelius Agrippa: The Life of Henry Cornelius Agrippa von Nettesheim, Doctor and Knight, Commonly known as a Magician
- John Lothrop Motley – The Rise of the Dutch Republic
- Frederick Law Olmsted – A Journey in the Seaboard Slave States; With Remarks on Their Economy
- William Ridley – gurre kamilaroi
- Alexis de Tocqueville – L'Ancien Régime et la révolution

== Births ==
- January 9 – Lizette Woodworth Reese, American poet (died 1935)
- January 13 – Henrietta Stannard, English novelist (writing as John Strange Winter, died 1911)
- February 14 – Frank Harris, Irish-born American journalist and memoirist (died 1931)
- March 4 – Toru Dutt, multilingual Indian Bengali poet, novelist and translator (died 1877)
- April 4 – Eva Allen Alberti, American dramatics teacher (died 1938)
- April 5 – Booker T. Washington, African-American educator, author and orator (died 1915)
- May 6 – Sigmund Freud, Austrian neurologist and founder of psychoanalysis (died 1939)
- May 15 – L. Frank Baum, American children's writer, novelist and poet (died 1919)
- June 28 – Constantin Dobrescu-Argeș, Romanian journalist, playwright, and peasant activist (died 1903)
- June 29 – Maria Cederschiöld, Swedish journalist and suffragette (died 1935)
- June 6 – Kate Simpson Hayes, Canadian playwright and legislative librarian (died 1945)
- July 25 – Charles Major, American novelist and lawyer (died 1913)
- July 26 – George Bernard Shaw, Irish dramatist and critic (died 1950)
- August 8 – Thomas Anstey Guthrie (F. Anstey), English comic novelist and journalist (died 1934)
- August 20 – Jakub Bart-Ćišinski, Upper Sorbian poet, writer, playwright and translator (died 1909)
- August 27 (August 15 O.S.) – Ivan Franko, Ukrainian writer, translator and political activist (died 1916)
- September 28 – Kate Douglas Wiggin, American children's writer and educator (died 1923)
- October 14 – Vernon Lee, born Violet Paget, French-born English writer (died 1935)
- October 17 – Jane Barlow, Irish novelist and poet (died 1917)
- November 17 – Evelyn Everett-Green, English novelist and children's writer (died 1932)
- December 21 – Tomas O'Crohan, Irish Gaelic writer and fisherman (died 1937)
- unknown date – Anne Elliot, English novelist (died 1941)

== Deaths ==
- January – James Baillie Fraser, Scottish travel writer (born 1783)
- February 17 – Heinrich Heine, German poet (born 1797)
- April 26 – Pyotr Chaadaev, Russian philosopher (born 1794)
- June 11 – Friedrich Heinrich von der Hagen, German philologist (born 1780)
- June 26 – Max Stirner, German philosopher (born 1806)
- June 27 – Joseph Meyer, German publisher and encyclopedist (born 1796)
- July 11 – Josef Kajetán Tyl, Czech dramatist and author of national anthem (born 1808)
- July 21 – Emil Aarestrup, Danish poet (born 1800)
- July 29 – Karel Havlíček Borovský, Czech poet, critic and publisher (tuberculosis, born 1821)
- August 24 – William Buckland, English theologian and antiquary (born 1784)
- August 30 – Gilbert Abbott à Beckett, English humorist (typhoid, born 1811)
- October 13 – Robert Christie, Canadian historian and journalist (born 1787)
- November 10 – Johann Kaspar Zeuss, German historian and philologist (born 1806)

== Awards ==
- Newdigate Prize – William Powell James
