= Darius Cobb =

American painter

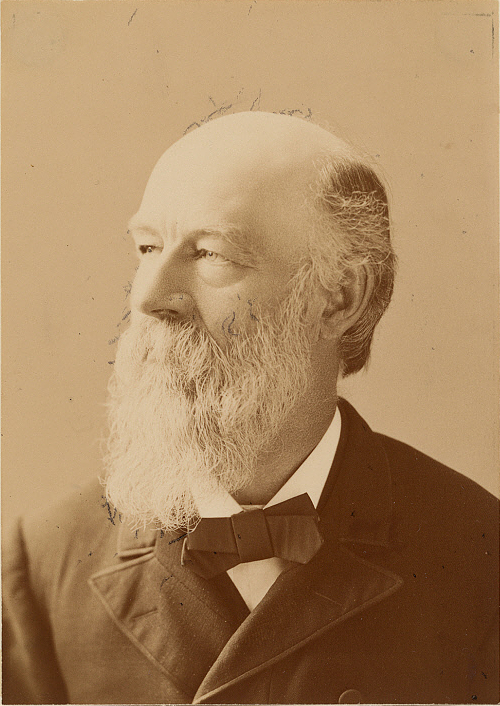
- Born: August 6, 1834; Malden, Massachusetts, U.S.
- Died: April 23, 1919 (aged 84); Newton, Massachusetts, U.S.
- Known for: Painting

Darius Cobb (August 6, 1834 – April 23, 1919) was an American painter. Cobb was considered to be one of America's best painters during his lifetime, as well as a painter of society portraits, landscape, religious themes and historical costumes. He was also noted as a musician, singer, poet, lecturer, lithographer, and art critic.

== Biography ==
"Battle of Bunker Hill" by Darius Cobb, 1880s

Born in the old Ralph Waldo Emerson House in Malden, Massachusetts, Darius Cobb was a descendant of Henry Cobb of Kent, England, who came to Plymouth, Massachusetts in 1629 on the ship Anne. Darius and his twin brother Cyrus were the sons of the Reverend Sylvanus and Eunice Hale Waite Cobb. The Cobb twins had an older brother, Sylvanus Cobb, Jr., who became a noted author in the late 19th century and wrote as a columnist for the New York Ledger. Eunice Hale (Waite) Cobb, the mother of Darius and Cyrus, founded the first women's club in America, the Ladies Physiological Institute, which promoted health and fitness.

Darius Cobb first received his education through public schools, then, with his twin brother, Cyrus (1834–1903), he attended the Lyman School of East Boston. In the course of his later studies, he and his brother Cyrus studied classics under Professor I. N. Eyers, mathematics at the Norway Liberal Institute in Maine, and oratory under Wyzeman Marshall, while at the same time studying music, art and literature. Darius eventually graduated with high honors from Boston Latin School.

== Family life ==
On January l, 1866, the twin brothers were married by their father in a double wedding ceremony to sisters; Cyrus to Emma Lillie and Darius to Laura Marie Lillie. The two girls were lineal descendants of John Alden of Pilgrim fame. Darius and his wife had seven children, including four daughters: Lillie Alden, Cora Stanwood, Estelle Marcy and Edith Harriet; and three sons, Stanwood, Percival Bartlett and Frederick Walter. Of those children, Frederick resided in Newton Upper Falls, Massachusetts, and was shipping agent for the Pettee Machine Works. His home was on Rockland Place in the old John A. Gould House. Cyrus and his wife had five children, including three daughters, Grace, Elsie, and Florence, and two sons, Francis S. and Ernest. Ernest purchased the old Cunningham estate on Richardson Road in 1918 from which he and his wife, Bertha, successfully operated the Arlo Publishing Company which featured children's books.

For a time the brothers lived side by side, Cyrus at 1129 and Darius at 1134 Boylston Street. The fame of the two families led to Bolyston Street Hill being known as Cobb's Hill for many years. Later, Darius moved to 127A Tremont, the address he was listed at when his biography appeared in the 1918 Marquis Who's Who. In that same Who's Who volume, Cyrus is listed as having his art studio at the same address: 127A Tremont Street, Boston.

Eventually, Darius moved his family to Newton Upper Falls in the early 1880s, where he resided for the rest of his life.

== A career in art ==
Though Darius would become the more famous of the two brothers, Cyrus enjoyed national fame, too. Cyrus Cobb practiced law for six years but later devoted full-time to the arts of painting and sculpting. Cyrus predominantly chose sculpture and Darius painting. Both Cobb brothers spent the greater part of their careers in Boston. In their art work their great instructor was Nature. They also received instruction from a relative and pupil of Washington Allston, who imparted to them in their youth many valuable ideas of that master. Cyrus' paintings were of a historical nature and included portraits of General U. S. Grant, Abraham Lincoln and a canvas entitled Warren at the Old South which is hung at the Old South Meeting House in Boston. He also delved into etchings. Cyrus Cobb's two best-known public sculptures are the Soldier's Monument (co-created with brother Darius) on the Cambridge Common and the full-length portrayal of Paul Revere at Boston. His design for the Soldier's Monument was selected from about 40 other entries. His sculptured pieces also included a head entitled The Celtic Bard, a heroic bas-relief Prospero and Miranda, a bust of General Butler, a bust of Phillips Brooks and one of local interest, that of Reverend Samuel Francis Smith, author of the patriotic hymn "America". This latter piece was placed in the State House. Cyrus Cobb also wrote and illustrated Sonnets to the Masters of Art. He was a full member of the Boston Art Club.

In 1862 the brothers enlisted in the 44th Massachusetts Infantry, doing service in North Carolina for nine months. In 1870, the two brothers co-authored a book titled The Veteran of the Grand Army, based on their war experiences. Their Civil War service gave them an edge in the design competition for the Cambridge Soldiers Monument, dedicated in 1870. The figure of a soldier at the top of the monument was their first life-size sculpture.

He had the soldier's hat, the worn knapsack, the dented canteen. But when Darius Cobb set out in the 1870s to make a still-life lithograph of Civil War artifacts, he was missing one important element - a tin cup. So, tacked onto the wall in the trompe-l'œil rendering is a scrap of paper with a sketched outline and the words "Dipper Missing". "Each painting has a story like this," said Susan Abele, curator of "Rediscovering Newton Artists, 1850-1950", at the Newton History Museum at the Jackson Homestead.

Darius was art editor/critic of the Boston Traveler, 1872–79, and became prominent in musical and literary circles and on the lecture platform.

Later in life the Cobb brothers worked together on a series of paintings illustrating French history for Boston's Tuileries Apartment Hotel. While Cyrus eventually became an accomplished sculptor, Darius was best known for his landscapes and portraits. His portrait of Ralph Waldo Emerson hung in the Emerson School in Newton Upper Falls for many years. However, it was religious paintings for which Darius Cobb would become better known. His first significant religious work was entitled Judas, followed by Christ Before Pilate, Abraham, and a magnificent head of Christ called The Master. This painting was completed in 1917 when the artist was 83 years of age. He had worked on it for 34 years before considering it finished. Unfortunately, a few years after his death it was destroyed in a fire.

In May, 1858, he painted the portrait of Reverend John Stetson Barry, Historian, descendant of Cornet Robert Stetson and Captain Charles Barry whose family was prominent among the founders and leaders of the political and business communities of Boston and served admirably the cause and course of the American Revolution, most noted of these was his cousin, the Commodore John Barry, Father of the American Navy. Reverend John Stetson Barry was an Historian. He was the author of "The History of Massachusetts", a three-volume work, authoritative for the periods covered and honored by many students of history* as the first comprehensive history of the United States written by an American. His research in preparation for the volumes led to the discovery of the long-lost BRADFORD MANUSCRIPT "of Plimouth Plantation" which was eventually returned from its place of deposit in England and is now preserved in the State House at Boston. The portrait of Reverend John Stetson Barry by Darius Cobb is in the private collection of Mrs. Barbara C. Gray of Gilmanton, NH.

Around 1868 he painted the portrait of Henry Wilson, the U.S. Senator from Massachusetts, 1855–1873, who was then Vice President of the United States under Ulysses S. Grant. This work hangs in the Morse Institute Library in Natick, Massachusetts. In 1881, Cobb was hired to paint a series of pictures titled Site of the Boston Medical Library in 1881. Today, this series of paintings are in the collection of the Harvard Medical Library. In 1877, Cobb produced an oil on canvas portrait of Massachusetts Senator Charles Sumner. In 1890, Cobb painted a portrait of Civil War General Benjamin Butler at the State House in Concord, New Hampshire. That painting was reproduced as the frontispiece engraving in Butler's autobiography, Butler's Book, which was published in 1892.

Among Darius Cobb's more noted pictures are portraits of Reverend John Stetson Barry (1858); Louis Agassiz (1875) and Rufus Choate (1876); "King Lear" (1877); "Judas in the Potter's Field" (1877); "Christ Before Pilate" (1878); "For Their Sakes" (1879); "Washington on Dorchester Heights" (1880); portraits of Gen. B. F. Butler (1889), and Rev. Phillips Brooks (1893); "Immortality" (1893); and portraits of John A. Andrew (1894) and Charles P. Clark (1897).

In 1897, assisted by his brother Cyrus, he decorated the walls of the banquet hall of the Tuileries, Boston, with panels illustrative of French history. Of the nine panels he painted six: "Jeanne d'Arc"; "An Intrigue in the Court of Louis XIII"; "Richelieu and the Mayor of Rochelle "; "A Troublesome Edict of Louis XIV"; "The Storming of the Tuileries"; and "The Downfall of the Second Empire."

In 1898 he painted two large pictures for the town hall at Revere, Massachusetts, the subjects being scenes in the ride of Paul Revere. Cobb's work managed to find life on a postcard, too. According to The Town Crier (Newton Upper Falls, Massachusetts) for May 5, 1911, 10,000 postal cards printed with Cobb's painting of the Last Comrade's Final Tribute were circulated throughout the United States.

== Legacy ==
Though Cobb was considered to be one of America's better historical painters during his lifetime, his work has not received much attention since his death in 1919. Still, his legacy lives on, as many of his finest pieces are included among many important collections, with specific works on display at the Peabody Essex Museum in Salem, Massachusetts, the Butler Institute of American Art in Youngstown, Ohio, and the State House in Concord, New Hampshire. Other works on display include Washington at Dorchester Heights, which was hung in the Memorial Continental Hall in Washington; The Old Drummer of the Revolution, which was placed in the Old State House in Boston; the Boston Tea Party, which was hung in the hall of the Ancients and Honorables; and The Death of Cuchullan, which is on display at Boston College. According to The Autobiography of William Sanders Scarborough, Cobb's paintings also hung in art galleries in England and France.

== Works ==
1858	Portrait of the Reverend John Stetson Barry	Private Collection, Gilmanton, NH
1864	Portrait of a Woman Wearing Pearl Drop Earrings	Unknown
1867	William Ellery Channing	Arlington Street Church
1872	Evacuation of Boston Harbor	Library in Malden, MA
1874	After the Storm	Heritage Museums & Gardens
1876	Northshore Landscape	Library in Malden, MA
1877	Portrait of a Lady	Library in Malden, MA
1877	Portrait of Charles Sumner	Massachusetts Historical Society
1888	Dipper Missing	The Newton History Museum
1894	John Albion Andrew	Harvard Art Museums
1902	President William McKinley, 1897-1901	Unknown
1906	Still Pond at Mountain's Foot, Autumn Landscape	Library in Malden, MA
????	Thunder Storm, Newton Upper Falls	The Newton History Museum
