= Stanwood Cobb =

American educator, author and prominent Baháʼí

- Born: November 6, 1881; Newton, Massachusetts, US
- Died: December 29, 1982 (aged 101); Chevy Chase, Maryland, US
- Occupation: Educator
- Spouse: Ida Nayan Whitlam
- Writing career
- Period: 1914–1979
- Genres: non-fiction, poetry and religious
- Subjects: Education and Baháʼí Faith

Stanwood Cobb (November 6, 1881 – December 29, 1982) was an American teacher, author and prominent Baháʼí of the 20th century.

He was born in Newton, Massachusetts, the son of Darius Cobb and his wife, née Laura Mae Lillie. Darius and his twin brother Cyrus Cobb were Civil War soldiers and artists, and descendants of Elder Henry Cobb of the second voyage of the Mayflower. Their mother was Eunice Hale Waite Cobb, founding president of the Ladies Physiological Institute of Boston. Darius Cobb and his wife had four daughters and three sons. Stanwood Cobb studied at Dartmouth College, where he was valedictorian of his 1903 or 1905 graduating class, and then at Harvard Divinity School, earning an A.M. in philosophy and comparative religion 1910. His thesis work, Communistic Experimental Settlements in the USA, observed that every such settlement had failed within a generation because of an inability of communism to get people to subordinate their own desires for the good of the group. In 1919, he married Ida Nayan Whitlam. Cobb was a member of several literary associations and of the Cosmos Club of Washington, D.C.

Cobb lived internationally for some years before settling in Chevy Chase, Maryland, where he died.

== Career as educator ==
In 1907–1910, Cobb taught history and Latin at Robert College in Constantinople (now Istanbul), followed by several years teaching in the US and Europe. He later headed the English department at St. John's College in Annapolis, Maryland (1914–15), taught at Asheville School in Asheville, North Carolina (1915–16), and was instructor in history and English at the United States Naval Academy (1916–19). Frustrated by the teaching experience at the Academy, Cobb heard a lecture by Marietta Johnson who helped marshal and crystallize his thoughts on education practice and curriculum theory. As a result, in 1919, Cobb founded the Chevy Chase Country Day School, of which he was the principal until his retirement, and, active in the progressive education movement in the United States, became a founder and motivating force, first secretary, and eventually president (1927–1930) of The Association for the Advancement of Progressive Education, in 1931 renamed Progressive Education Association (PEA) and then American Education Fellowship. The first president was Arthur E. Morgan. Later, the influential John Dewey served as president. Cobb resigned the presidency in 1930 following the influx of supporters of George Counts who moved the focus of the Association from a student-centered learning approach to one of a social policy oriented approach to education theory. However, between the enormous impact of World War II on all thought and the involvement of many members of the PEA in communism and the general atmosphere of Anti-communism in the United States the achievements of the PEA both before Cobb's resignation and after were largely lost.

== Life as a Baháʼí ==
After looking at Theosophy and Reform Judaism and other themes in religion' Cobb investigated the Baháʼí Faith after a series of articles in the Boston Transcript on the religion attracted his attention. He pursued the interest to Green Acre conference center in Eliot, Maine in 1906 during his studies at Harvard Divinity School preparing for the Unitarian ministry. Sarah Farmer much affected Cobb, and Thornton Chase was giving a series of talks. It was on that occasion that Cobb became a Baháʼí.

Between 1909 and 1913 he met with ʻAbdu'l-Bahá five times (twice in Akka and several times during the latter's travel to Europe and the US). In 1911 Cobb and a number of others gave talks in honor of the personal invitation by ʻAbdu'l-Bahá to the pilgrimage of Louis Gregory.

Cobb was a founding member of the Spiritual Assembly of the Baha'is of Washington D. C. in 1933, and served on various committees (for example Cobb was Chairman of the Teaching Committee in 1935) and edited two Bahá'í journals: Star of the West in 1924, and World Order from 1935 to 39.

== Books and articles authored ==
Cobb was a prolific writer. Among his books were:

- The Real Turk. 1914, The Pilgrim Press, ISBN B000NUP6SI.
- Ayesha of the Bosphorus. 1915, Boston Murray and Emery Co.
- The Essential Mysticism. 1918, Four Seasons, (republished 2006 by Kessinger Publishing, LLC as ISBN 978-1-4286-0910-5).
- Simla, A Tale of Love. 1919, The Cornhill Company.
- The New Leaven: Progressive Education and Its Effect upon the Child and Society. 1928, (Guy Thomas Buswell review published in The Elementary School Journal, Vol. 29, No. 3 (Nov., 1928), pp. 232–233)..
- The Wisdom of Wu Ming Fu. 1931, Henry Holt and Company.
- Discovering the Genius Within You 1932, John Day Publisher, and again, World Publishing Co., Cleveland, 1941.
- New Horizons for the Child. 1934, Avalon Press.
- Security in a Failing World. 1934, Avalon Press.
- The Way of Life of Wu Ming Fu. 1935 (reprinted 1942), Avalon Press.
- Character – A Sequence in Spiritual Psychology. 1938, Avalon Press.
- Symbols of America. 1946, Avalon Press.
- Tomorrow and Tomorrow. 1951, Avalon Press.
- The Donkey Or the Elephant. 1951, Avalon Press.
- What is Man?. 1952.
- Sage of the Sacred Mountain; a Gospel of Tranquility. 1953, Avalon Press.
- Magnificent Partnership. 1954, Vantage Press Publisher (Warren S. Tryon review published in The New England Quarterly, Vol. 28, No. 3 (Sep., 1955), p. 429).
- What is God?. 1955, Avalon Press.
- What is Love?. 1957, Avalon Press.
- Islamic Contributions to Civilization. 1963, Avalon Press.
- Memories of ʻAbdu'l-Baha. 1962, Avalon Press.
- The Importance of Creativity. 1967, Scarecrow Press.
- Life With Nayan. 1969, Avalon Press.
- Radiant Living. 1970, Avalon Press.
- The Meaning of Life. 1972, Avalon Press.
- Thoughts on education and life. 1975, Avalon Press.
- A Call to Action: Develop Your Spiritual Power : Man's Fulfillment on the .... 1977, Avalon Press.
- A Saga of Two Centuries 1979 (autobiography).

Similar to his books, the focus of Cobb's articles has been education and Baha'i oriented – he has contributed to or was anthologized by:

- The Atlantic Monthly (Feb 1921)
- The Journal of the American Society for Psychical Research by the American Society for Psychical Research,
- The School Arts Magazine by Davis Press,
- Childhood Education by the Association for Childhood Education International
- Child Study by Child Study Association of America
- The New England Magazine by the Making of America Project
- The Path of Learning: Essays on Education by Henry Wyman Holmes, Burton P. Fowler, Published 1926 by Little, Brown and Company
- Progressive Education by Progressive Education Association

as well as

- The Baháʼí World (see Baha'i Periodicals for information)
- World Order

== See also ==
- Baháʼí views on Communism
- Education reform
- G. Stanley Hall
- International Journal of Progressive Education
