= Civil War Monument (Cambridge, Massachusetts) =

War monument in Cambridge, Massachusetts, U.S.

- United States
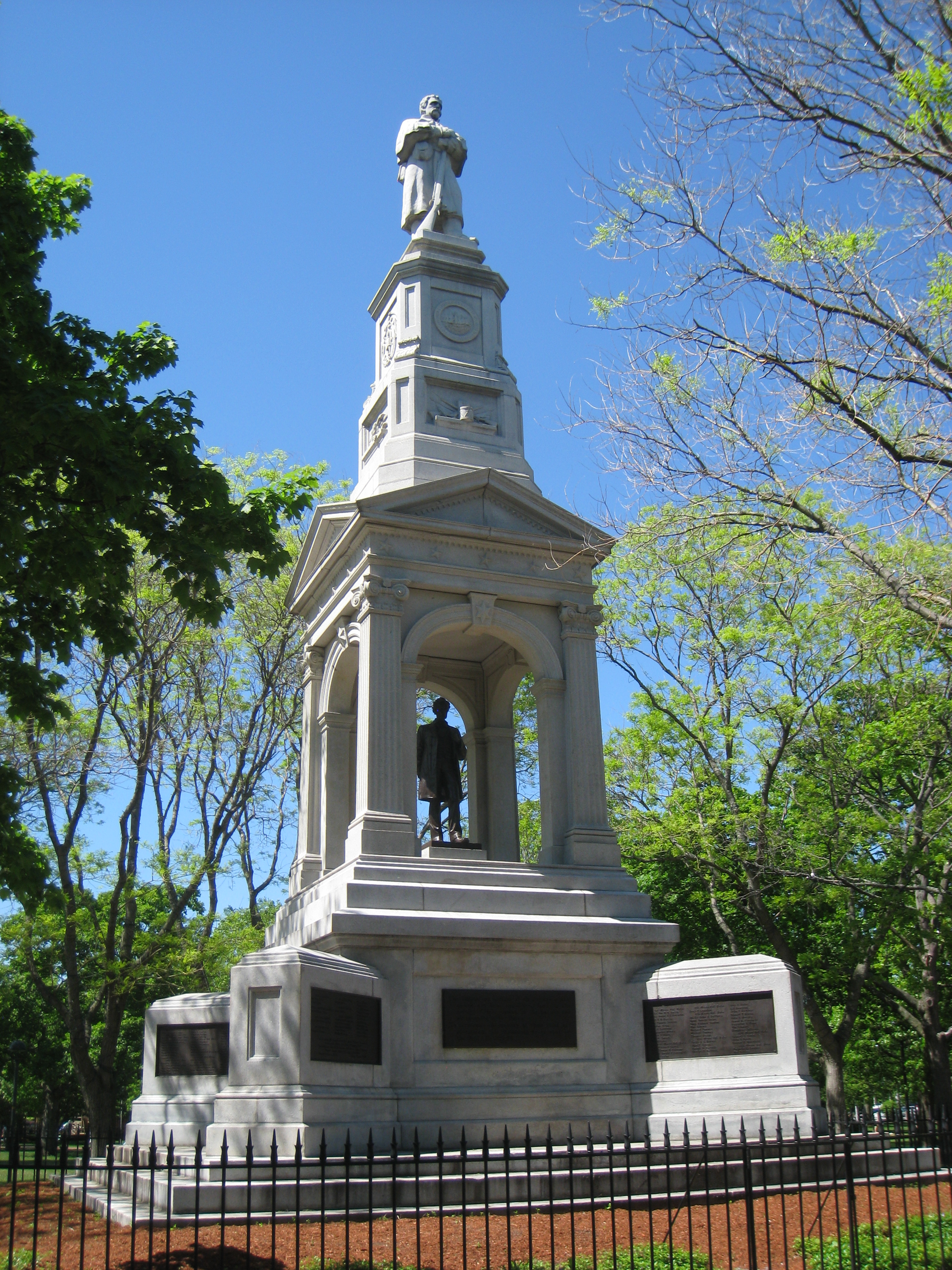
- The memorial in 2008
- Used for those deceased
- Location: 42.37637°N 71.12039°W; Cambridge Common near Cambridge, Massachusetts
- Designed by: Cyrus Cobb; Darius Cobb; Thomas W. Silloway

The Civil War Monument, also known as the Civil War Memorial and Lincoln-Soldier Monument, is installed in Cambridge Common, in Cambridge, Massachusetts, United States.

The monument was completed in 1870 and was designed by artists Cyrus Cobb and Darius Cobb with supervising architect Thomas W. Silloway. McDonald & Mann were the contractors.

The memorial features a bronze statue of Abraham Lincoln.

== See also ==
- List of sculptures of presidents of the United States
- List of statues of Abraham Lincoln
