= Eunice Hale Cobb =

19th-century American writer and public speaker

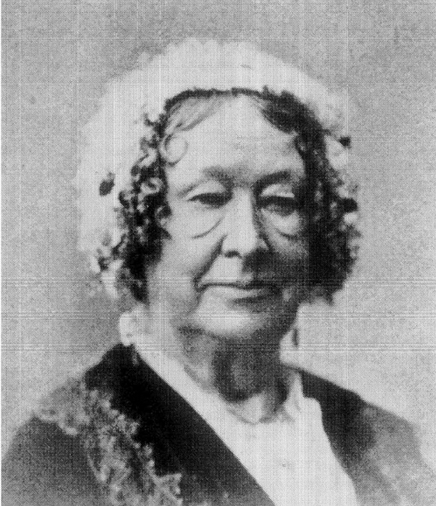
- Born: Eunice Hale Waite; January 27, 1803; Kennebunk, Maine, U.S.
- Died: May 2, 1880 (aged 77); East Boston, Massachusetts, U.S.
- Resting place: Woodlawn Cemetery, Everett, Massachusetts
- Occupations: Writer; public speaker; activist
- Spouse: Rev. Sylvanus Cobb (m. 1822)
- Children: 9, including Sylvanus, Jr.; Cyrus; and Darius (twins)
- Relatives: Stanwood Cobb (grandson)
- Writing career
- Notable work: "The First Article"

Eunice Hale Cobb (née Waite; January 27, 1803 – May 2, 1880) was an American writer, public speaker, and activist. She wrote hymns, and occasional poems, and obituary lines; her poetry had a religious focus. As a public speaker, she was persuasive and convincing. She was the first female president of the Ladies Physiological Institute, of Boston, and served it in that capacity for some 15 years. After marrying married Rev. Sylvanus Cobb, she assisted him in his religious work as a Universalist preacher. Their eldest son, Sylvanus, Jr., developed a faculty for storytelling from his mother's practice of telling stories when he was a child.

== Early life and education ==
Eunice Hale Waite was born in Kennebunk, Maine, January 27, 1803, the second child of Elizabeth Stanwood and Captain Hale Waite. Her father had removed to Kennebunk from Ipswich, Massachusetts, a short time before Cobb was born, and he returned there soon after her birth, so that Ipswich was associated with her earliest childhood. Captain Waite died when Cobb was five years old, leaving a widowed mother and four children, two of whom died at a very early age.

After her father's death, Cobb was cared for by her maternal grandparents, who were Calvinists. At the age of ten, her mother married Samuel Locke (1784-1873), of Hallowell, a man of liberal education who was a school preceptor by profession. He was known to have exerted an influence on his stepdaughter. Thoroughly imbued with the Calvinistic doctrine by her grandparents, Cobb, at an early age, became a prominent member of the Baptist church of Hallowell. Asking her stepfather for spiritual guidance, he responded: "I will not try to shake your faith, but I would have you study candidly, patiently, intelligently, fearlessly, the Bible."

=== Family ===
Of her genealogy, the following was contained in a son's memoir: —

Thomas Waite of Ipswich is first mentioned in 1658. He was appointed sergeant in 1664. His wife was complained of before the court for wearing a silk dress, but it was decided that she was entitled to do so. From various circumstances, it is supposed that Thomas Waite was of the same family with the Maiden Waites, and with'them descended from Samuel Waite of Wethersfield, Essex County, England; but the evidence of such descent seems unattainable. Of his five children, the second son, John, was born in 1658, died May 21, 1736. He married for his first wife, Kathren Carroll, August 14, 1685; for second wife, Hannah Dorr, November 16, 1712. Their children numbered eight. Jonadab, the third son, was born February 20, 1690, married Hannah Adams, September 11, 1725, and died July 6, 1761. They had one child, John, baptized August 17, 1729. He was married to Sarah Kimball, November 30, 1749; died in February 1752, leaving his widow, Sarah Waite (who in 1773 married John Hodgkins), and two children, of whom John, the youngest, was born April 24, 1752. In the year 1773 he married Eunice Hale of Newbury. March 1782, she died; and December 29, 1785, he took for his second wife, Judith Hale. John Waite died August 6, 1789. Of the three children by his first marriage, Hale was the second, born April 30, 1779; died 1807. He married Elizabeth Stanwood, and had two daughters, the youngest of whom was Eunice Hale, who married Sylvanus Cobb. In March 1684, Sergeant Thomas Waite was granted land on which to build a house for his son John; and it was in that house that Hale Waite, the father of Mrs. Cobb, was born.

Philip and Jane Stanwood were living in Gloucester in 1653, and from them Elizabeth was directly descended. Isaac Stanwood, born May 2, 1755, married Eunice Hodgkins of Ipswich, February 26, 1778. Their second child, and first daughter, was Elizabeth, born September 29, 1781; baptized October 14, 1781.

== Career ==
=== Writer ===
Cobb followed her stepfather's advice, and the result was an article written by her, "The First Article", for the Universalist Magazine of April 21, 1821, a paper published by Henry Bowen, in Boston, and edited by Rev. Hosea Ballou. The article occupied one-fourth of the paper. Ballou decided to have this first article printed in sheets and distributed for the purpose of strengthening others who stood doubtful between the old and the new theologies. Two copies were printed on white satin and sent to the author.

In May 1821, at the age of 18, Cobb commenced a diary, which she kept until she died. In that same month, she heard a sermon by Rev. Sylvanus Cobb, a Universalist preacher. They were married in Hallowell, at her stepfather's house, on September 10, 1822. As a minister's wife, Cobb was first settled in Waterville, Maine. Her second settlement was in Malden, Massachusetts. Her next change was to their home of 22 years, in East Boston, with which church she was connected for 40 years. This home was so pleasant, they named it the "Castle of Peace".

Cobb was a frequent contributor to the religious press. She wrote a good deal for Universalist papers, writing in prose and verse. The most and best of her writings were of personal and local interest. Cobb's name as a writer appears in the work devoted to the poets of Maine, published at the end of the nineteenth-century, her poetry devoted to the good of humanity. Immediately after the death of her youngest son, James Arthur, at nine years of age, Cobb wrote his memoir.

=== Activist ===
Cobb's life was spent in work for the public welfare, including Sunday schools. She had interests in all the great reforms of her day. In the cause of temperance, she was an effective worker and speaker. She was a champion for the rights of woman in the broadest sense. While she was not identified with the public advocates of woman's rights, she counted among her warmest and most devoted friends eminent leaders of this reform, and sympathetically interchanged views on this topic. She attended, by invitation, the first Woman's Rights Convention held in Massachusetts – at Worcester.

Cobb and her husband joined with Professor Charles P. Bronson in founding the Ladies' Physiological Institute of Boston, the leader of all similar institutions in this country, Rev. Cobb obtaining the charter for it. Professor Bronson acted as president, by courtesy, the first year. Cobb then became the first elected president, and served until old age compelled her to resign the leadership. She continued her official connection with the organization by serving as corresponding secretary until a short time before her death.

== Personal life ==
She married Rev. Sylvanus Cobb in Hallowell, Maine, in 1822. They had nine children, including:

- Sylvanus, Jr. (1823–1887)
- Samuel Tucker (1825-1897)
- Eunice Hale (1827–1871)
- Ebenezer (1829–1898)
- George Winslow (1831-1909)
- Sarah Waite (1832–1853)
- Cyrus (1834–1903)
- Darius (1834–1919)
- James Arthur (1842–1852)

Five of her family served in the American Civil War: four sons, Sylvanus, Jr., George, Cyrus and Darius, as well as Lafayette Culver, husband of her daughter, Eunice Hale. Sylvanus, Jr., commanded at Fort Kittery, Maine, and the others served in Virginia and North Carolina. Stanwood Cobb was a grandson. Rev. Cobb died October 81, 1866, age 68, of hypertrophy of the heart. He was the author of a "Commentary on the New Testament," a "Compend of Divinity," and several other works. He founded, and for many years edited, the "Christian Freeman". He had been a Freemason.

Cobb was told that her name was inscribed on the Masonic record in such a manner as virtually to make her an honorary member of the order. She was also a prominent and active member of the Independent Order of Rechabites, a temperance association organized by women.

The first sign of her failing health was a paralytic shock. She had always desired to die in the old rocking chair in which her mother and grandmother died, while the Sunday morning bells were ringing; her wish was met. Cobb died at the residence of her son, George, on May 2, 1880, in East Boston, and was buried at Woodlawn Cemetery, Everett, Massachusetts.

Her papers, including diaries and biographical material, are held by Radcliffe Institute for Advanced Study at Harvard University.
