= Wyzeman Marshall =

American actor, educator and theatre manager (1816–1896)

Wyzeman Marshall (Hudson, New Hampshire, September 26, 1816 – December 6, 1896) was a stage actor in New York City and Boston between the 1820s and 1870s, as well as a teacher of oration and elocution. He often shared the same stage with Edwin Booth, brother of Abraham Lincoln assassin John Wilkes Booth.

== Ccareer ==
In the 1850s, Wyzeman taught oratory at the Norway Liberal Institute in Massachusetts. Among his students was the painter Darius Cobb.

From 1858 to 1860, he was a "Past Junior Grand Warden" with St. John's Lodge, a Freemason organization in Boston.

Sometime in the early 1860s, Marshall managed the Howard Athenaeum in Boston.

In 1863 and 1864, the Boston Theater was under the Marshall's management.

The Waltham Sentinel (in Waltham, Massachusetts) reported on January 25, 1867, about a Rumford Institute lecture by Marshall, "the well-known Shakesperian [sic] actor".

Between 1867 and 1874, Marshall was a regular lecturer at the Salem Lyceum where he was often on the same bill as Frederick Douglass, Ralph Waldo Emerson and Oliver Wendell Holmes Sr.

From the Harvard News: "Secure your tickets for the grand musical and literary entertainment at Union Hall, Thursday evening, Jan. 17, 1884, at Brock and Leavitt's. Talent-Germania Orchestra; Thomas Henry, cornetist; Wyzeman Marshall, elocutionist; Mrs. E. A. Taylor, soprano; Lotos Glee Club."

On December 4, 1896, The New York Times reported: "Wyzeman Marshall, the actor, Dying." He was referred to as a veteran actor and teacher of elocution.

== Actresses who studied under Marshall ==
- Charlotte Blair Parker (1858–1937)

== Family ==
Marshall had a brother, Leonard Marshall, who published a book in 1854, titled Hunter's Glee, dedicated to Wyzeman. Containing many references in the German language, the book included music composed by Leonard.
