= Ladies Physiological Institute =

The Ladies Physiological Institute was the first women's club in the United States of America and promoted health and fitness. The institute was co-founded by Eunice Hale Waite Cobb, the mother of Darius and Cyrus Cobb, noted Boston artists.

== History ==
In Boston, the Ladies’ Physiological Institute was formed in 1848. A course of lectures was given that year on the “laws of life and health,” by Professor Bronson, which aroused so much interest that at the close, an organization was formed with him at the head, and with the expressed purpose of promoting among women's knowledge of the human system, the laws of life and health, and the means of relieving sickness and suffering. Several of the most advanced women of the time became members and 400 women joined the organization. Bronson was the first president, but in 1850, Cobb was made president.

In 1850, Cobb, Ann M. Kendall, C. E. N. Kimball, Sarah Goodridge, and Rebecca W. Cleverly incorporated the organization for the purpose of promoting, among women, a knowledge of the human system, the laws of life and health, and the means of relieving sickness and suffering.

The society met with much opposition, as it was considered immodest and almost disreputable for women in that day to be interested in anatomy and hygiene. For several years, only one minister could be found in Boston who would make a prayer for them at a public meeting. After the first women physicians became established in Boston, a feminine member of the medical profession was always chosen for president; but in spite of its bad name, the character of the women who made up the club, — the most advanced and liberal of the mid-19th century,— brought the organization through its doubtful period and won entire respect from the community. From the beginning, the Institute, as it was called, held weekly or fortnightly meetings, with lectures on physiology, hygiene, and sanitation, and many of the leading physicians and ministers of New England spoke before this body. The duty of parenthood, the science of reproduction, the sacredness of the home were taught to thousands of young women, and an unbroken record of 60 years of earnest work was credited to the Ladies’ Physiological Institute. The club joined the Massachusetts State Federation in early years, and was the first to open the movement which resulted in the Committee of Council and Co-operation, a body composed of delegates from other important clubs to work together for the public good in whatever way suggested itself from year to year, such as the establishment of houses of detention and police matrons.

Another early Massachusetts club which existed for approximately 50 years was the Moral Education Society, along similar lines, merged with the Ladies’ Physiological Institute.

== Collection ==
The historical correspondence created by the Ladies Physiological Institute were donated to the Arthur and Elizabeth Schlesinger Library on the History of Women in America, Radcliff College, in Cambridge, Massachusetts in November, 1976.

This collection, which includes documentation from 1848-1966, was processed under a grant from the National Historical Publications and Records Commission.

The Arthur and Elizabeth Schlesinger Library has written this introduction to the collection:

"The Ladies' Physiological Institute was an outgrowth of five years of meetings (1843-1848) on women's physiology led by one of Boston's first women physicians, Harriot K. Hunt. In 1848 Professor Charles P. Bronson announced a course of lectures for women "who should form themselves into a society for the promotion of useful knowledge among their own sex," offering to present such a group with his medical apparatus if they could raise $1000. Hunt's group met, adopted a constitution, and chose Eunice H. Cobb to receive Prof. Bronson's donation, which consisted of a full size model of a woman; other anatomical models; bones; and French engravings. As none of the women was prepared to defy public opinion by serving as president of the new club, Prof. Bronson filled that office for the first two years. Within a year of its formation, the L.P.I. had 454 members, in spite of the prevailing view that it was immodest and disgraceful for women to talk about the human body.

On May 6, 1850, the Institute was incorporated in Massachusetts stating its purpose as "promoting among women a knowledge of the human system, the laws of life and health, [and] the means of relieving sickness and suffering." Eunice Cobb, called "Mother Cobb," was elected president. The Institute held weekly lectures, covering such topics as "Physiology and Hygiene of Women in Middle Life," "Dress Reform and Physical Development," and "Development of Character in Schools." In 1895, the L.P.I. joined the Massachusetts State Federation of Women's Clubs, and in 1906 the General Federation of Women's Clubs. Over the years the scope of topics broadened, reflecting the more general interests of women's clubs in the late nineteenth and twentieth centuries."
