= The Gunmaker of Moscow =

1856 novel by Sylvanus Cobb Jr

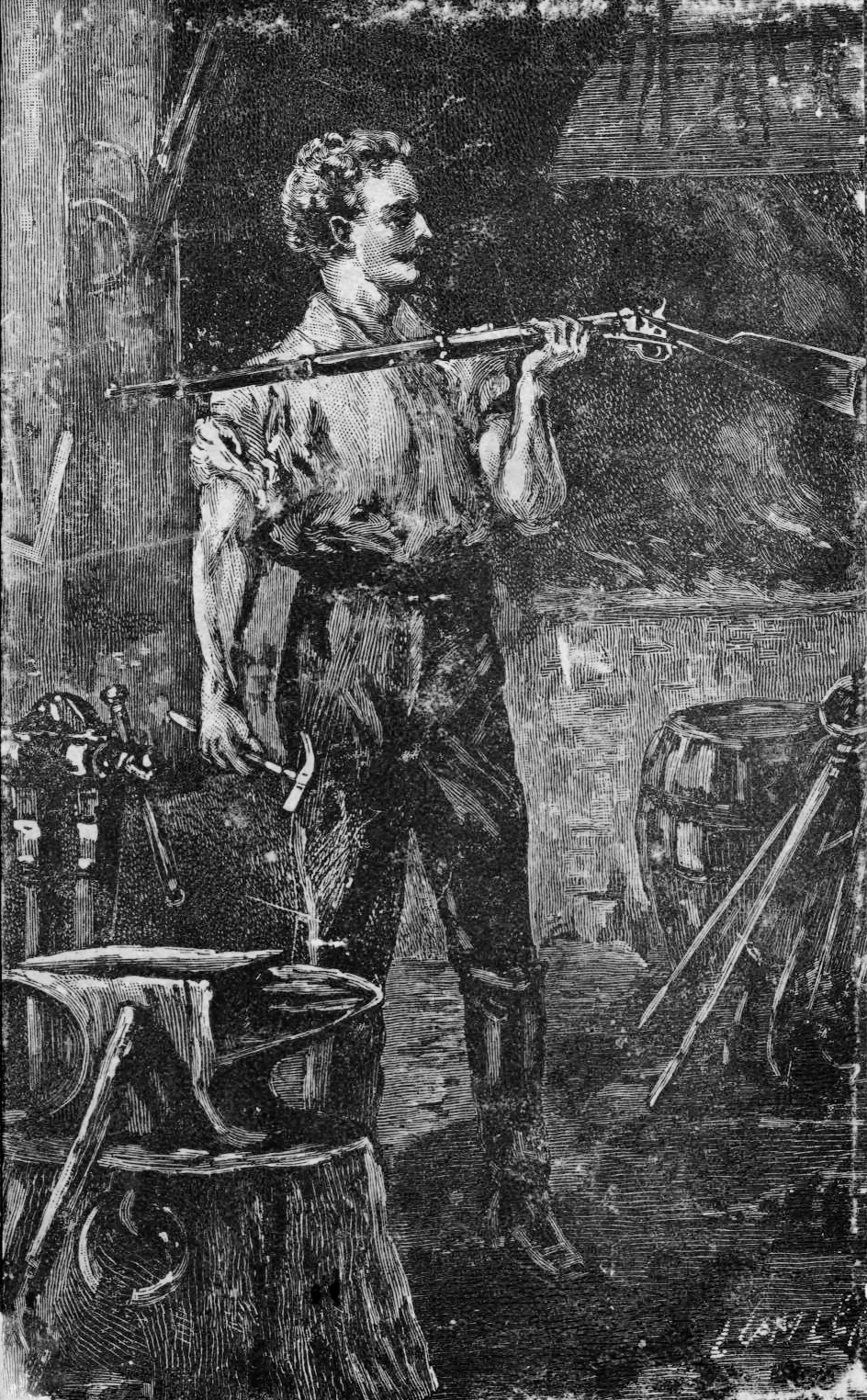
Cover illustration to an early book edition

The Gunmaker of Moscow is a serial novel by Sylvanus Cobb Jr., first published in the New York Ledger starting on April 19, 1856. The first of Cobb's contributions to the Ledger, it was extremely popular though never critically acclaimed (and never intended to be), and was reprinted in the Ledger multiple times. It was one of the most popular works of the 1850s. It was not published in book form until 1888, when it was again a bestseller.

It was adapted into a play, and also into a silent film by Edison Studios in 1913.
