= Olaf Liljekrans =

1856 play by Henrik Ibsen

Olaf Liljekrans is an 1856 play by Henrik Ibsen.
