= Sylvanus Cobb Jr. =

American writer (1823–1887)

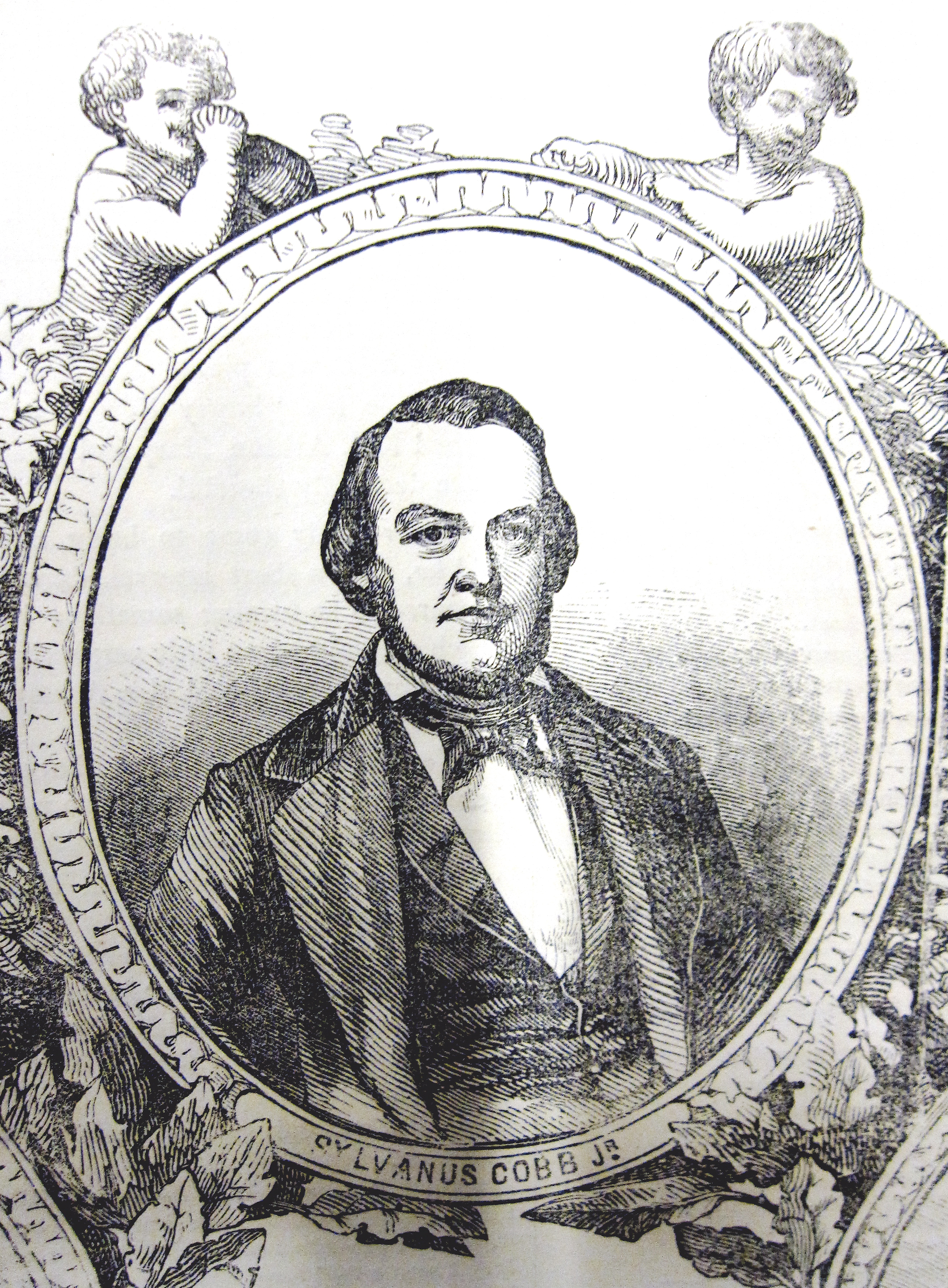
Sylvanus Cobb Jr. 1852

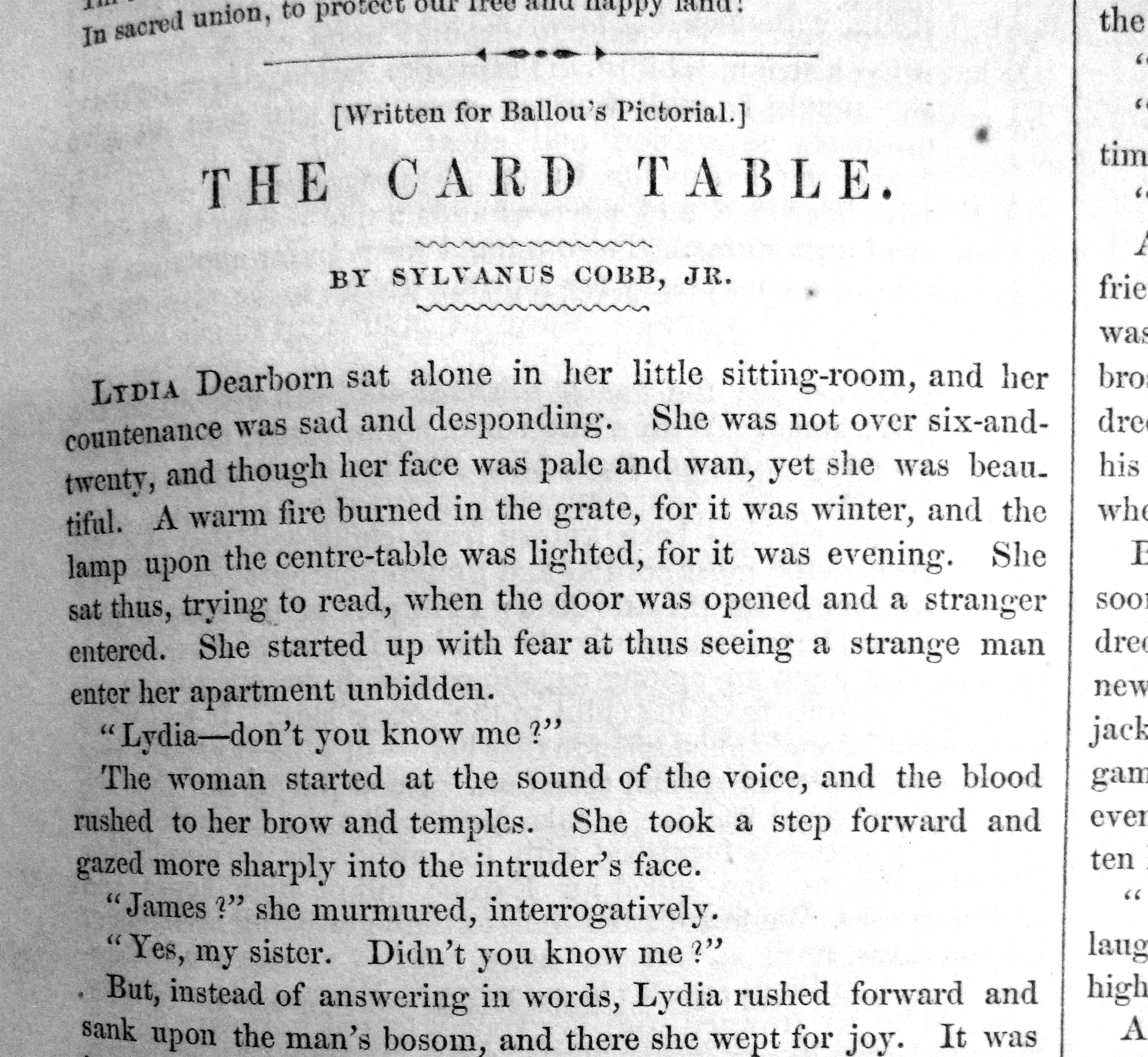
Excerpt from The Card Table. Ballou's Pictorial, ca.1856

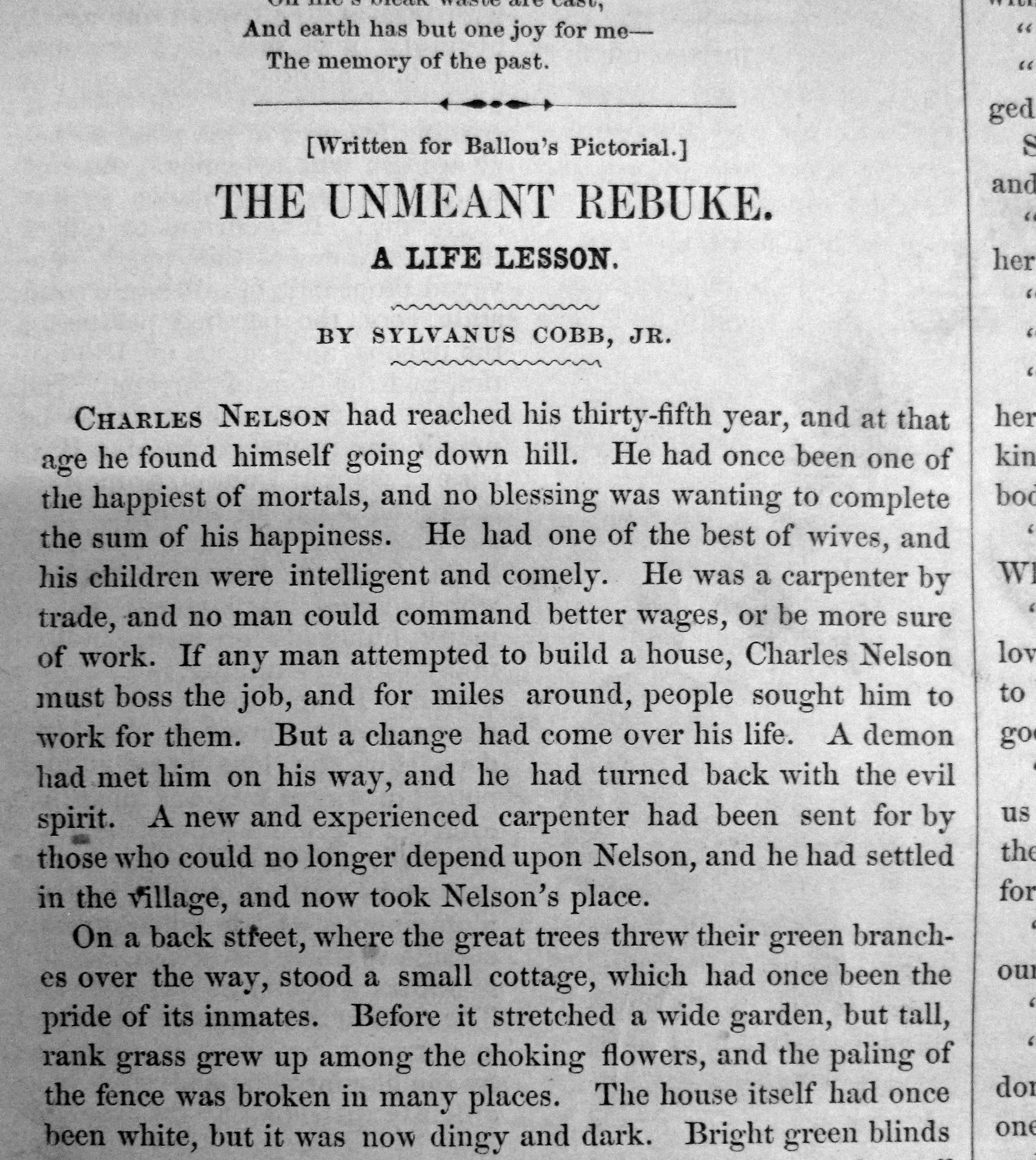
Excerpt from The Unmeant Rebuke. Ballou's Pictorial

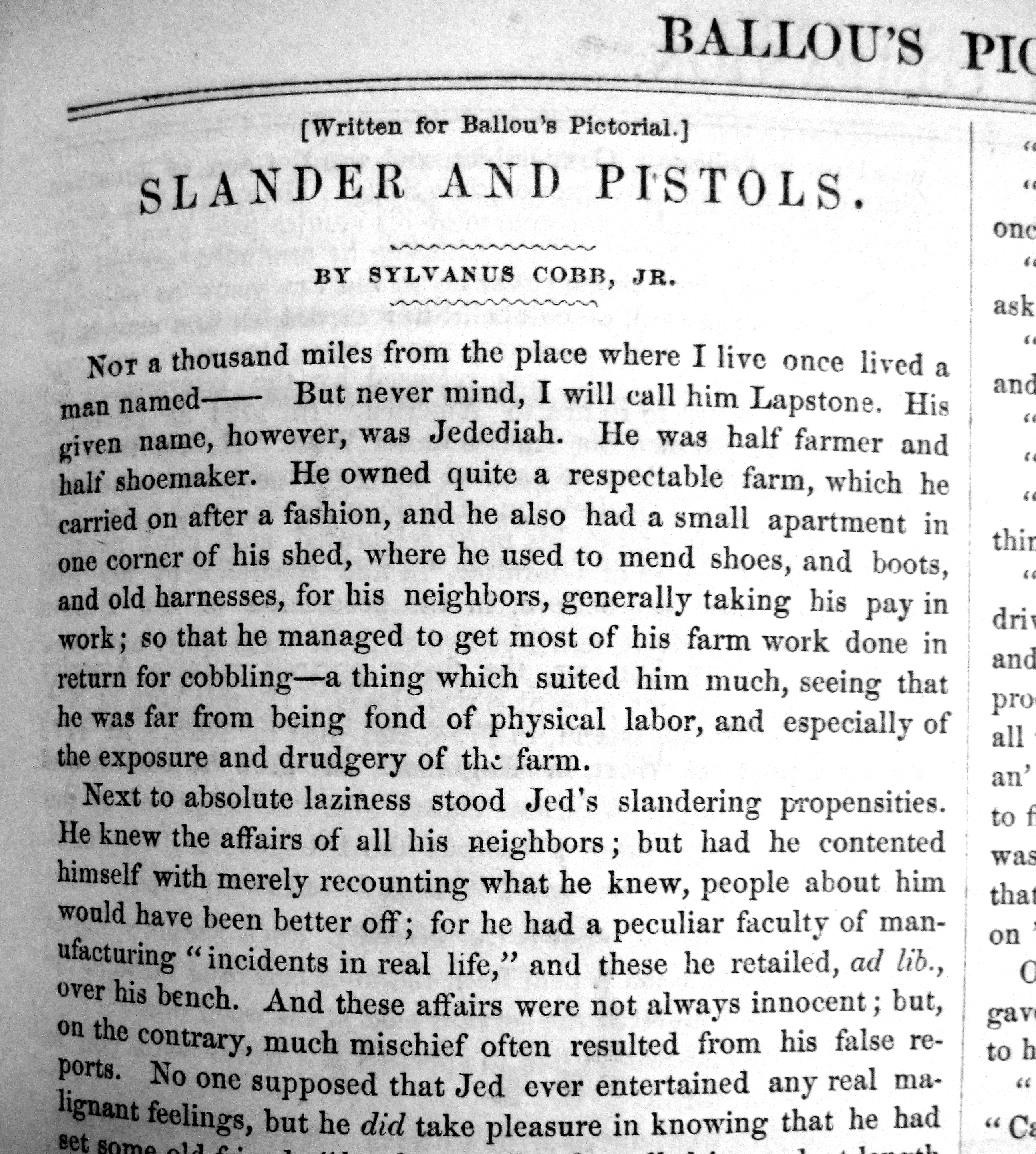
Excerpt from Slander and Pistols. Ballou's Pictorial, ca.1855

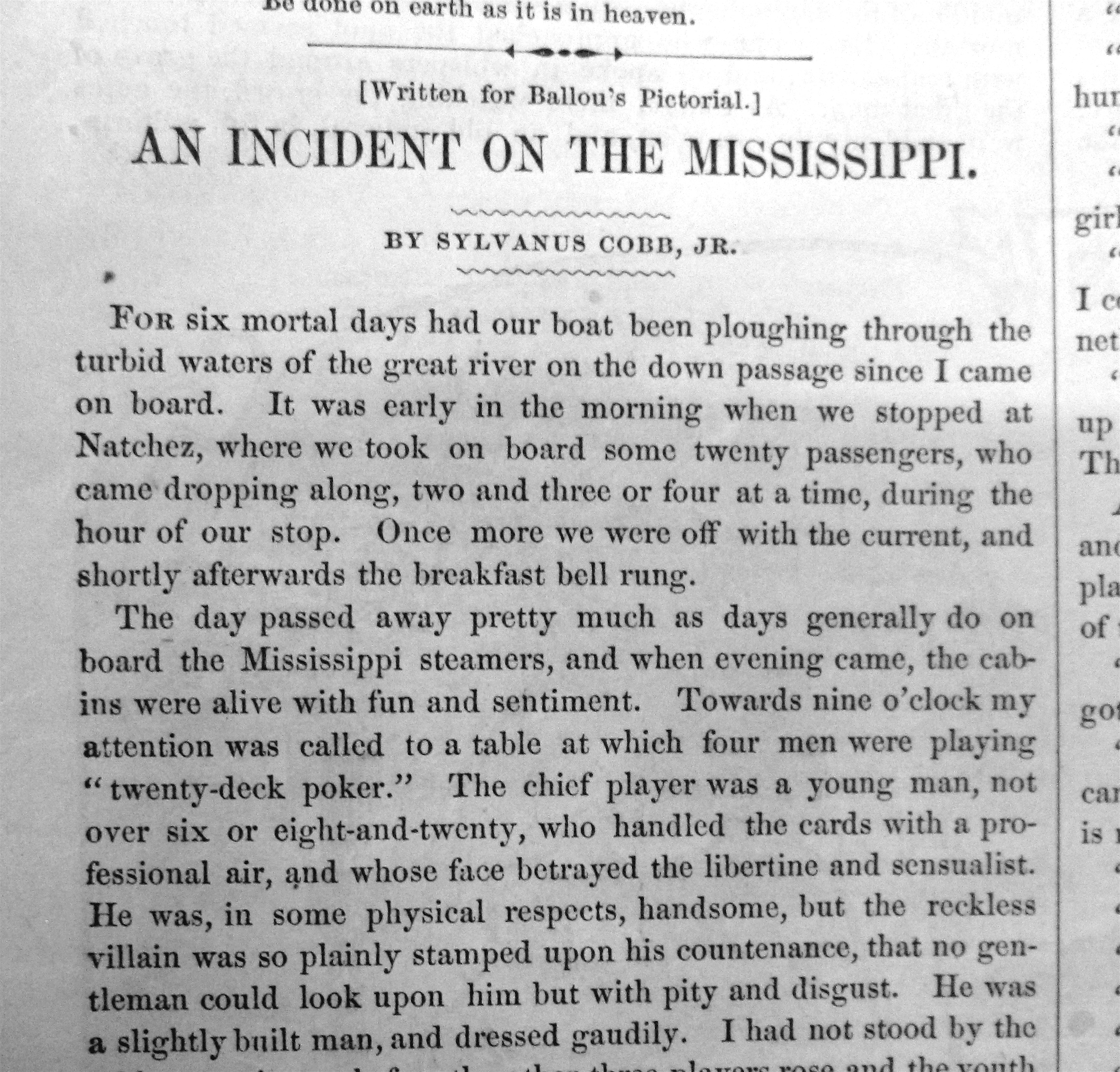
Excerpt from An Incident on the Mississippi. Ballou's Pictorial

Sylvanus Cobb Jr. (June 5, 1823 – July 20, 1887) was an American popular fiction writer during the mid-19th century. His work was published in the New York Ledger, The Flag of Our Union, The Weekly Novelette, Gleason's Pictorial Drawing-Room Companion, and elsewhere.

== Brief biography ==
Cobb was born in Waterville, Maine, to Sylvanus Cobb and Eunice Hale Waite. Cobb served in the United States Navy, 1840–ca.1843. He married Jane Head in 1845; they had two children. He joined the Freemasons in Norway, Maine in 1854.

He began writing stories around 1850. Frederick Gleason published Cobb's first story, "The Prophet of the Bohmer Wald: a Tale of the Time of Joseph II, Emperor of Germany" in The Flag of Our Union. His work was also published in Gleason's Pictorial beginning in 1851.

Cobb wrote prolifically. He "wrote and sold no less than 120 novels, more than 800 short stories, and found time to prepare some 90,000 manuscript pages of short items to pad out the columns of ... weeklies." Some say he sacrificed quality for quantity. According to one biographer, "Mr. Cobb was a fluent writer, who spent little time perfecting his style. As he summed up his work he wrote in the 31 years that he contributed to the New York Ledger 89,544 large pages of manuscript." Others evaluated Cobb as "a prolific writer of sensational tales quite without literary value."

Cobb published under various pseudonyms:

- Austin C. Burdick
- Charles Castleton
- Col. Walter B. Dunlap
- Enoch Fitzwhistler
- Dr. J.H. Robinson
- Dr. S. LeCompton Smith
- Symus, the Pilgrim
- Amos Winslow Jr.

Several of his stories were adapted for the stage, including "The Mystic Bride." His "stories were reprinted many times by other publishers including Street & Smith (Columbia Library); Beadle & Adams; Frederic A. Brady; Elliott, Thomes & Talbot; George W. Studley; Ogilvie (Detective Series); and Donahue (Flashlight Detective Series)."

Around 1869, Cobb relocated to Hyde Park, Boston, where he lived until his death in 1887. "Mr. Cobb amassed a large fortune by his pen, and built himself a handsome house at Hyde Park. His study was situated in a remote corner of the house in a tower built exclusively for his convenience. There he wrote uninterrupted, surrounded by all the curious odds and ends that he had picked up during his life. He was particularly fond of arms and armor, and his collection of these articles was rare and valuable."

Friends included the professional magician Jonathan Harrington.

Cobb's portrait was painted by his brother, Darius Cobb.

== Selected works ==
- The Gunmaker of Moscow (1856 serial, 1888 book)
- Fernando: or, The Moor of Castile. A Romance of Old Spain. F. Gleason's Publishing Hall, 1853.
- Ben Hamed: or, The Children of fate: A Story of the Eastern World. Elliott, Thomes & Talbot, 1863.
- A Love Match. P. Bonner's Sons, 1891.
- Orion, the Gold Beater. H. T. Coates, 1896.
