= Cyrus Cobb =

American lawyer

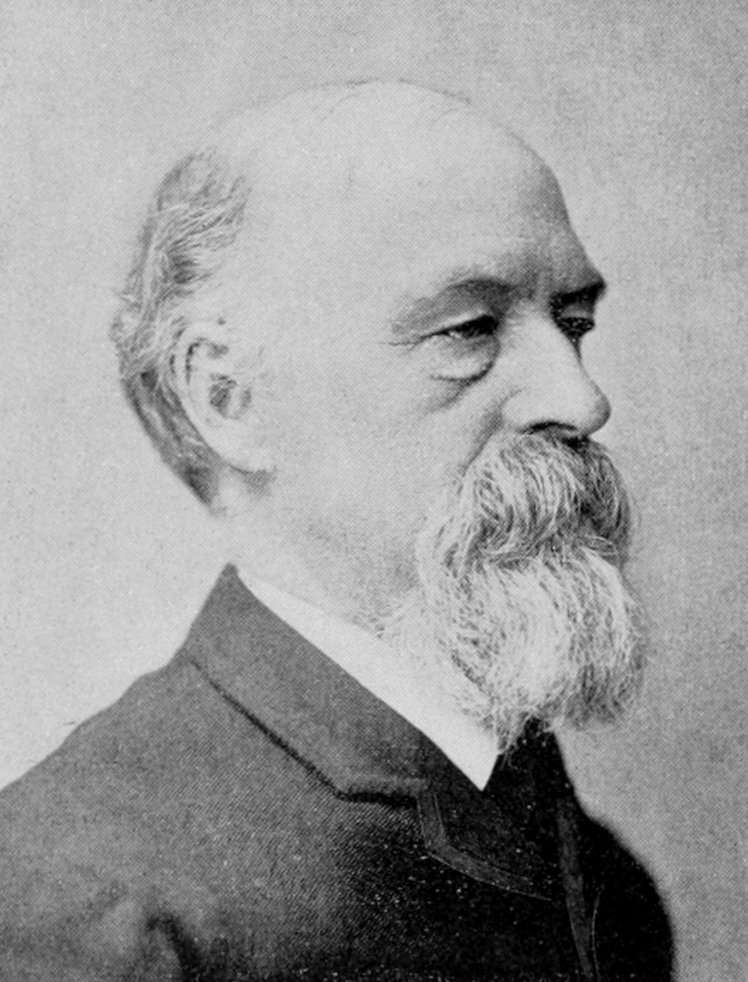
- Born: August 6, 1834; Malden, Massachusetts
- Died: January 29, 1903 (aged 68); Allston, Massachusetts
- Occupations: Lawyer, sculptor, poet, musician
- Spouse: Emma Lillie
- Children: 5
- Parents: Sylvanus Cobb (father); Eunice Hale Waite Cobb (mother)
- Relatives: Darius Cobb (brother)

Signature
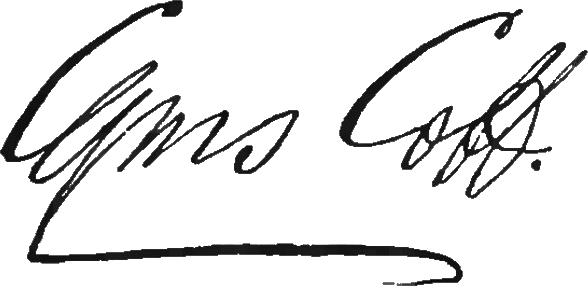

Cyrus Cobb (August 6, 1834 - January 29, 1903) was an American lawyer, sculptor, poet and musician.

== Early years and education ==
Cyrus Cobb, twin brother of Darius Cobb, the painter, was the son of Rev. Sylvanus Cobb, Universalist clergyman, and Eunice Hale Waite Cobb, the writer. He was born in Malden, Massachusetts, August 6, 1834. He was educated at the public schools, one of which was the Lyman School in East Boston, Massachusetts. He studied art in America, declining to go to Europe for the purpose lest he should thus lose sympathy with American ideals. He studied law in Boston University.

== Career ==
Cobb served in the Union Army in the American Civil War, and afterward wrote a book entitled, The Veteran of the Grand Army, in vindication of the Grand Army of the Republic, of which he was a devoted member.

Cobb was admitted to the Suffolk bar in June 1873, and practiced law for six years.

In 1879, he devoted himself to sculpture, and produced a number of important works, both portrait busts and monumental statuary. Among them were a heroic statue of Abbott Lawrence and a bust of Theodore Parker. His colossal head of The Celtic Bard, his bas relief of Prospero and Miranda, and his bust of General Butler, placed him in the front ranks of his profession. His design for the soldier's monument (1869) in Cambridge, Massachusetts was selected from 40 or more submitted to N. J. Bradlee, the noted architect, as incomparably the best. Cobb also painted several pictures. His best-known painting is Warren at the Old South, painted in 1880, though his portraits of Dr. A. P. Peabody and John Appreton were esteemed.

He was an accomplished musician and was frequently heard at concerts. He also wrote a series of sonnets on the Masters of Art, which were published.

== Personal life ==
He married Emma Lillie, while his twin brother, Darius, married her sister, Laura M. Lillie. He and Emma had five children. She died c. 1895.

Cobb died at Allston, Massachusetts, on January 29, 1903.
