= The New York Ledger =

Defunct paper published in New York City, United States

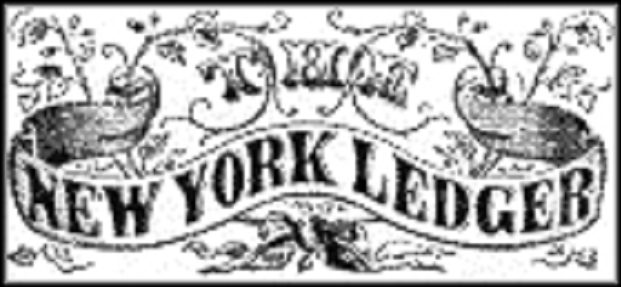

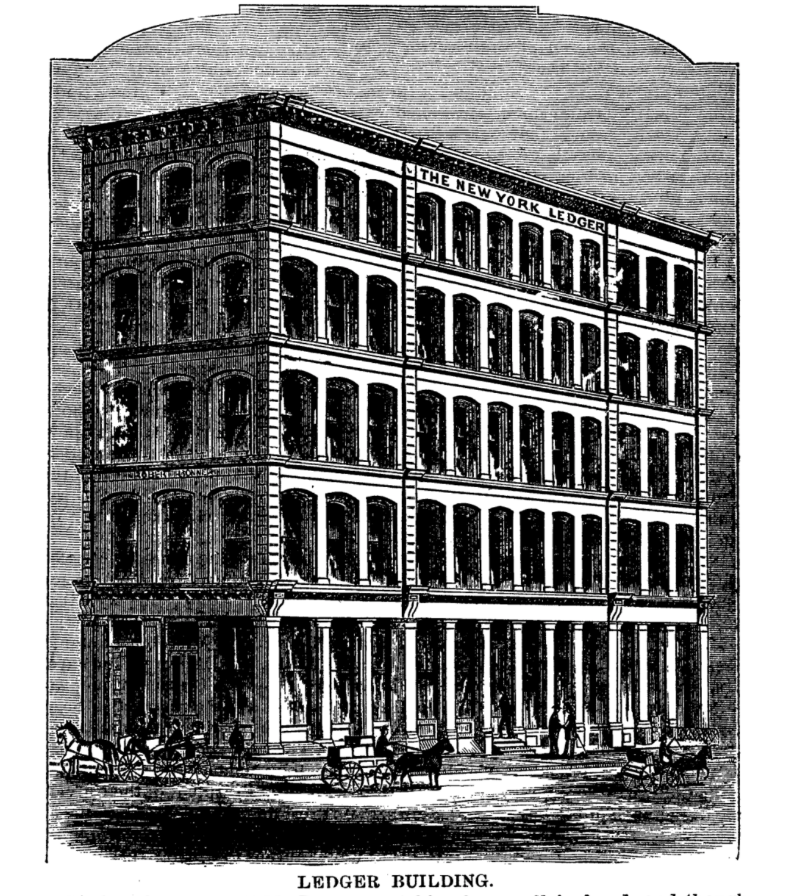
- The Ledger building in 1876
- Type: Daily newspaper
- Owner: Robert E. Bonner
- Founded: 1855
- Ceased publication: 1898
- Language: English
- Headquarters: Manhattan, New York

The New York Ledger was a weekly story paper published in Manhattan, New York. It was established in 1855 by Robert E. Bonner, by transforming the weekly financial journal called The Merchant's Ledger that he had purchased in 1851. Bonner turned the paper over to three sons to operate in 1887. The date of last issue was 1898, when it was changed to The Ledger Monthly, which disappeared by 1903.

Notable contributors included Ethel Lynn Beers, Sylvanus Cobb, Jr. (The Gunmaker of Moscow), Fanny Fern (whose first column appeared in 1855), William H. Peck, and E. D. E. N. Southworth (The Hidden Hand, among many others). The Ledger's principles were denoted to be "devoted", "choice literature", "romance", "the news", and "commerce". The Ledger also regularly published some of the most popular mid-century women poets including Sarah M. B. Piatt, Lydia Sigourney, and the Cary sisters, Alice and Phoebe.

== Unrelated papers ==
An unrelated political weekly called the New York Ledger was published in New York City from 1908 to 1910.

An unrelated newspaper called The New York Ledger exists.

== In popular culture ==
A special issue was printed TV-only especially for the CSI: New York episode "Civilized Lies", which was aired on January 11, 2013. The newspaper appeared in Law & Order episode "Happily Ever After", which aired in October 23, 1990, and Elementary episode "The Diabolical Kind", which was aired on January 2, 2014. The newspaper also appeared in the mystery/crime series Person of Interest, episode "Pretenders", which originally aired October 28, 2014. In The Mindy Project season 4 episode 23 aired June 14, 2016, the fictional character Dr. Jody Kimball-Kinney read in the opening sequence a faux issue of The New York Ledger with the headline "Congress Passes Law Regulating Air Emission". Its typography is that of The New York Times. The newspaper is a key in the plot of Castle episode 14 of season 2, "The Third Man", which aired on January 25, 2010. Commissioner Frank Reagan is seen perusing a copy at his desk in the early moments of Blue Bloods season 14, episode 10, which aired on May 17, 2024.

Printed modern issues of the paper showed up in Law & Order: SVU's 2nd and 16th season episodes "Baby Killer" and "Surrendering Noah". Its typography is identical to that of the New York Post, also used in Law & Order: Criminal Intent, S3E19 "Fico Di Capo".

The newspaper is briefly shown during an opening montage of alternative history in the Apple TV+ show For All Mankind in season two, episode 1.

The newspaper is indirectly referenced in Once Upon a Time (season 4, episode 22) when Henry sees a book with "New York Ledger Bestseller" printed on the cover.
