= Westel =

Westel may refer to:

- Westel Willoughby (1830–1897), American lawyer and soldier
- Westel Willoughby, Jr. (1769–1844), American physician and politician
- Westel W. Willoughby (1867–1945), American academic

== See also ==
- Western Telesystems Ltd, acquired by Celtel in 2007
- former name of Magyar Telekom
