= Ralza M. Manly =

American minister and educator (1822–1897)

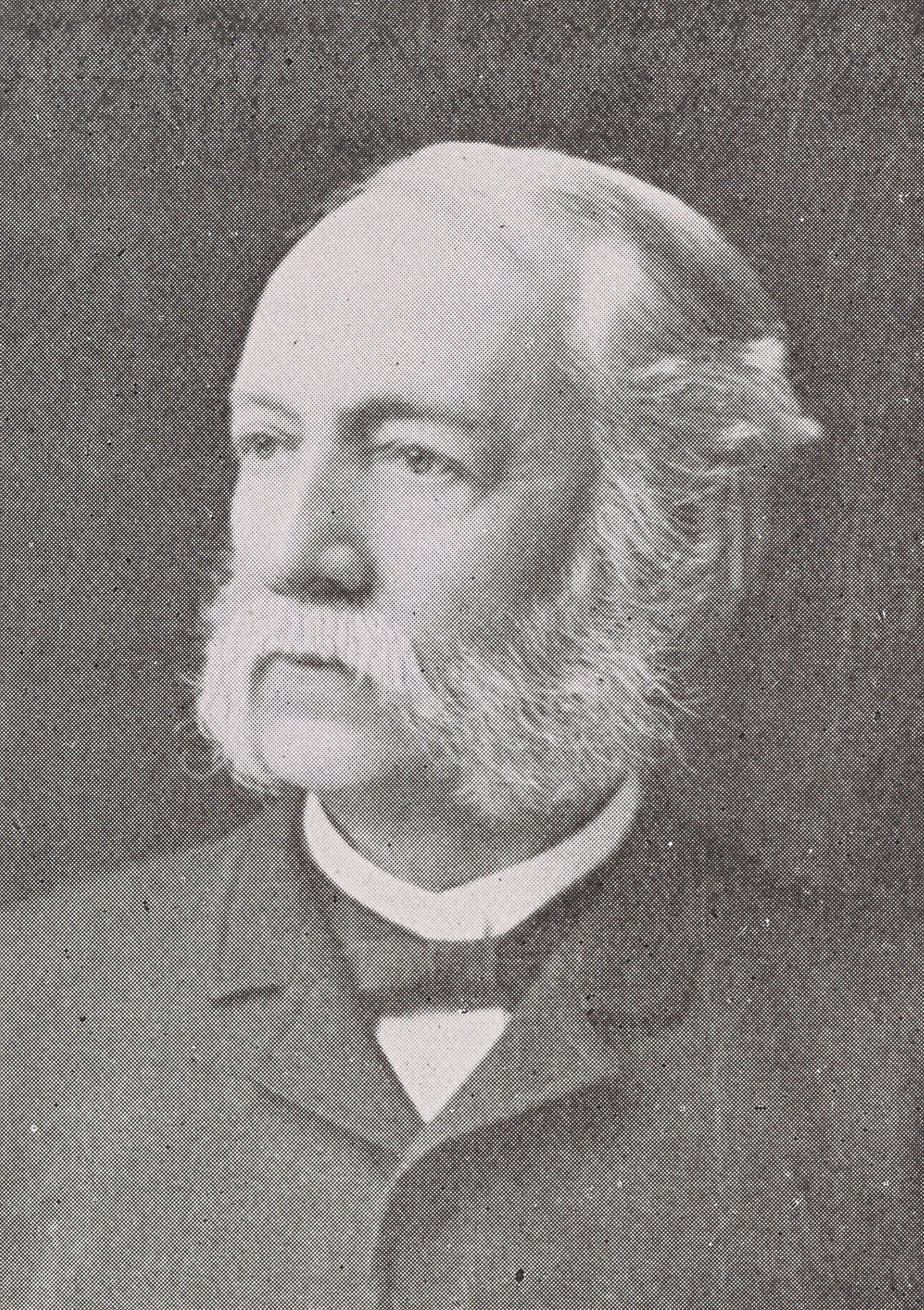
Manly in an 1897 book

Ralza Morse Manly (January 16, 1822 – September 16, 1897) was an American minister, educator, and politician. He led the development of schools for African-Americans in Virginia after the end of the American Civil War as the superintendent of Freedmen's Bureau schools in the state. Manly spearheaded the foundation of the Richmond Colored Normal School.

== Early life ==
Ralza Morse Manly was born on January 16, 1822, in Dorset, Vermont, to William Manly and Sarah Dunton Manly. He attended Wesleyan University, graduating with a bachelor and master's of arts, in 1848 and 1851, respectively.

== Career ==
For four years beginning in 1848, he was principal of a grammar school in Randolph, Vermont, before leaving to become president of Northfield Academy, a post he held from 1853 to 1854. From 1853 to 1857 Manly was also the editor of the Christian Messenger. In 1857 Manly was ordained as a minister in the Methodist Episcopal Church; he was a deacon by 1862 and an elder in 1864.

He taught natural science and Latin at the Newbury Seminary in 1857 followed by two years as the principal of the Troy Conference Academy and two years as the principal of the New Hampshire Conference Seminary, ending in 1862. Manly was a chaplain during the American Civil War with the 16th New Hampshire Infantry Regiment from October 1862 to 1863. On January 10, 1864, he became chaplain of the 1st United States Colored Cavalry Regiment. Manly was stationed with the 1st in Fort Monroe and created schools for soldiers who were illiterate.

Upon the war's end in 1865, Manly was assigned to the Freedmen's Bureau in June 1865 and made Virginia's assistant superintendent of education. He settled in Richmond, Virginia, and replaced W. H. Woobury as superintendent of the Freedmen's Bureau schools in Virginia after several months, a post he held until January 1869 and again from May 1 to August 15, 1870, at which point the Bureau stopped its operations in Virginia. Manly oversaw a vast increase in the state's school system during his tenure. In 1868 and 1869 Manly used his position to attempt to influence elections, through funding and assignments of teachers, in favor of Henry H. Wells and similar moderate Republicans, but was unsuccessful in the latter year. As superintendent he also opposed school integration, arguing that white people would refuse to attend integrated schools.

While superintendent, he envisioned creating a school which would train African-American teachers, who could in turn travel around the southern United States and "inspire" Blacks living around the nation. The school was opened in October 1867 in Navy Hill-Jackson Ward as the Richmond Colored Normal School, in part through the efforts of the Richmond Educational Association, which Manly co-founded and headed. Manly endeavored to ensure it was a success, giving the school a high-quality building, teachers, and equipment. It was initially funded privately, chiefly by missionaries from the northern United States. Manly himself was the school's president from 1869 to 1879, and later from 1883 to 1885, remaining active even after the Freedmen's Bureau ceased operation. Upon the Bureau's ceasing of operations, the Richmond Educational Association took ownership of the school. The Normal School was taken over by Richmond in June 1876.

In 1870, Manly became a founding vice president of the Virginia State Woman Suffrage Association. He also held a seat on the Richmond School Board from June 1869 to 1875 and city council from August 1869 to 1874. Manly was then elected to the city's new board of aldermen, a post he held for three years and eventually resigned in October 1877.

He taught at Wellesley College in Wellesley, Massachusetts, from 1885 to 1890.

== Personal life ==
On August 16, 1848, he married Sarah B. Wright; they had four children. After his wife died, he married Mary Louisa Patterson on July 15, 1884, and moved to Wellesley, Massachusetts. The couple moved to Georgia in 1892 and then to San Diego in 1895.

Manly died in San Diego on September 16, 1897.

== Bibliography ==
- Green, Hilary (2016-04-01). Educational Reconstruction: African American Schools in the Urban South, 1865-1890. Fordham Univ Press. ISBN 978-0-8232-7013-2.
- Gasman, Marybeth; Geiger, Roger L. (2012-08-14). Higher Education for African Americans before the Civil Rights Era, 1900-1964. Transaction Publishers. ISBN 978-1-4128-4724-7.
- Black Studies: A Select Catalog of National Archives Microfilm Publications. National Archives Trust Fund Board. 1984. ISBN 978-0-911333-08-4.
- Alexander, Ann Field (2002-10-29). Race Man: The Rise and Fall of the "Fighting Editor," John Mitchell Jr. University of Virginia Press. ISBN 978-0-8139-2439-7.
- Butchart, Ronald E. (2010-09-27). Schooling the Freed People: Teaching, Learning, and the Struggle for Black Freedom, 1861-1876. Univ of North Carolina Press. ISBN 978-0-8078-9934-2.
- Chesson, Michael B. (1982). "Richmond's Black Councilmen". Southern Black leaders of the Reconstruction era. Urbana : University of Illinois Press. ISBN 978-0-252-00929-7.
- Vaughn, William Preston (1974). Schools for all; the Blacks & public education in the South, 1865-1877. [Lexington] University Press of Kentucky. ISBN 978-0-8131-1312-8.
- Morris, Robert Charles (1981). Reading, 'riting, and reconstruction : the education of freedmen in the South, 1861-1870. Chicago : University of Chicago Press. ISBN 978-0-226-53928-7.
