= William F. Willoughby =

American scholar (1867–1960)

William Franklin Willoughby (born 1867 in Alexandria, Virginia – died 1960) was an author of public administration texts including works on budgeting. He often worked with his twin brother, Westel W. Willoughby.

He graduated from Johns Hopkins University, 1885

== Family ==
Wife: Bessie Talbot (Appleby) Willoughby Siblings: brother, Westel Woodbury Willoughby (1867–1945); sister, Alice Estelle Willoughby

== Biography ==
He was born on 20 July 1867 in Alexandria, Virginia to Westel Willoughby and his wife Jennie.

- Died: 6 May 1960 of a heart attack, Newport News, Virginia
- Graduated from Johns Hopkins University, 1885
- Siblings: brother, Westel Woodbury Willoughby (1867–1945); sister, Alice Estelle Willoughby
- Wife: Bessie Talbot (Appleby) Willoughby

== Leadership positions ==
- Statistical expert for U.S. Department of Labor, 1885
- Member of International Jury of Awards, Paris Exposition of 1900
- Instructor of economics at Harvard, 1901
- First Director of Brookings Institution
- Treasurer, secretary, and president of Executive Council of Puerto Rico of the Island of Puerto Rico, appointed Nov. 9 1901 by President Theodore Roosevelt, 1901–1909
- Assistant director of U.S. Census, 1910
- Member of U.S. Commission of Economy and Efficiency in Government
- McCormick Professor of Jurisprudence at Princeton, 1912
- Deputy legal advisor to president of China,Yuan Shikai, 1914–1916
- Director of the Institute for Government Research, 1916–1932
- President of the American Political Science Association, 1931–1932
- Consultant to the Library of Congress, 1940–1944

== Publications ==
- Child Labor. By William F. Willoughby, A.B., and Miss Clare de Graffenried. Publications of the American Economic Association.
- Workingmen's Insurance. Crowell and Company. 1898.
- The System of Financial Administration of Great Britain. A. Report by William F. Willoughby, Westel W. Willoughby, and Samuel Mccdne Lindsay. With- an Introduction by A. Laurence Lowell. (New York.: Appleton and Co. for the Institute of Government Research. 1917.)
- The Movement for Budgetary Reform in the States, D. Appleton and Co. NY. 1918
- The Government of Modern States, The Century Co., 1919
- Government Organization in War Time and After: A Survey of the Federal Civil Agencies Created for the Prosecution of the War, 1919
- The National Budget System, With Suggestions for Its Improvement, The Johns Hopkins Press, 1927
- Principles of judicial administration. Brookings Institution, 1929.
- Financial Condition and Operations of the National Government 1921–1930, The Brookings Institution, 1931
