= Samuel Fales Dunlap =

American lawyer, orientalist, and writer

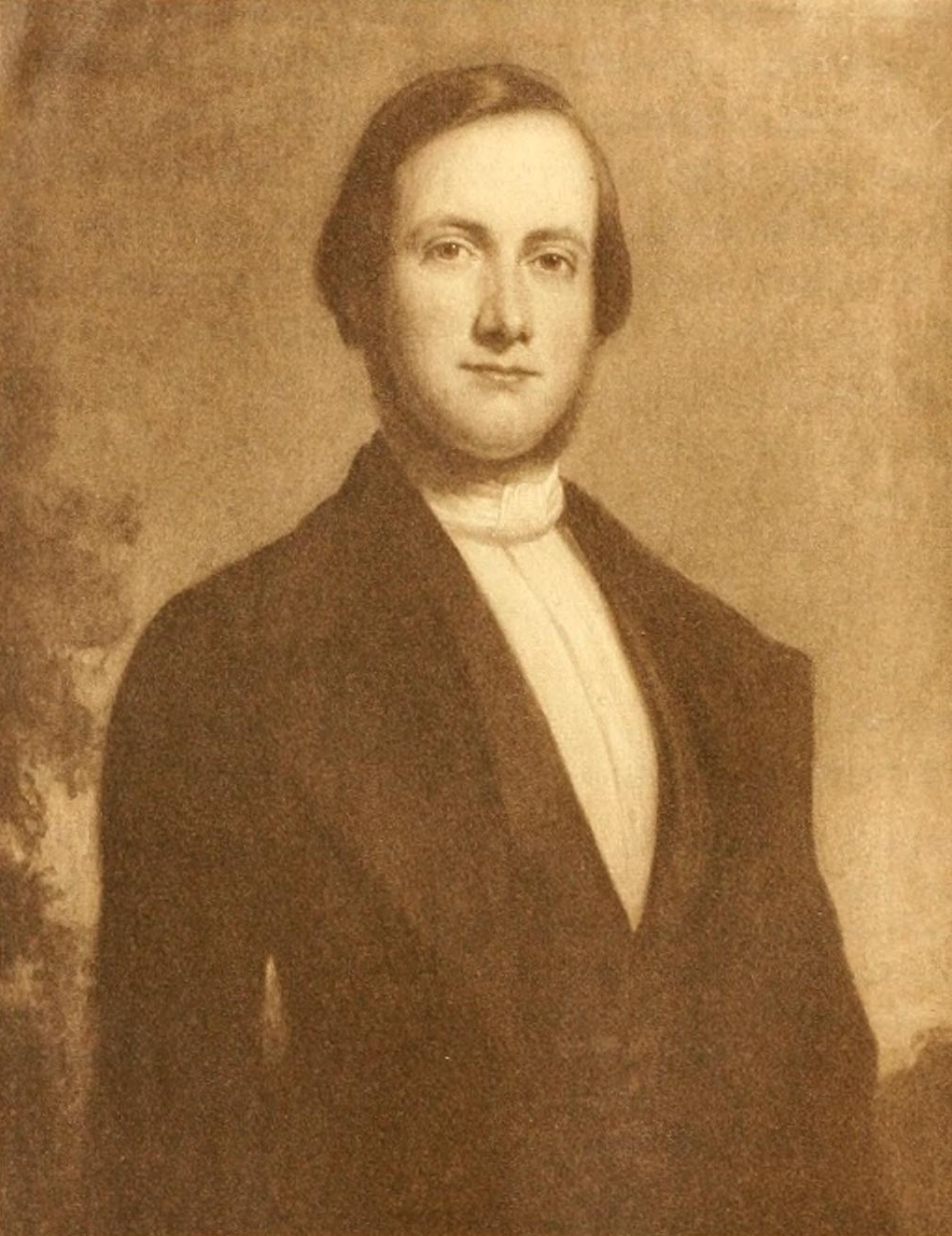
- Born: July 23, 1825; Boston
- Died: March 31, 1905 (aged 79); New York City
- Other name: Samuel F. Dunlap
- Education: Harvard University (1845)
- Occupations: Lawyer, orientalist, writer
- Years active: Mid to late 19th century
- Notable work: Vestiges of the spirit-history of man (1858); Sōd: the mysteries of Adoni (1861); Sōd: the son of the man (1861); The Ghebers of Hebron (1898)
- Parents: Andrew Dunlap (father); Lucy Ann Charlotte Augusta (mother)

Samuel Fales Dunlap (July 23, 1825, Boston – March 31, 1905, New York City), also known as S. F. Dunlap, was an American lawyer, orientalist, and writer.

== Biography ==
Samuel Fales Dunlap was born on July 23, 1825, to a wealthy family in Boston. His mother was Lucy Ann Charlotte Augusta, while his father was Andrew Dunlap, a Boston-based lawyer with a degree from Harvard University. Samuel Dunlap also studied law at Harvard University, graduating in 1845. Upon graduating, he went to Germany to study law, classical languages, ancient philology, and religion. He then returned to the United States to practice law in New York, sometime around the 1850s.

In the 1890s, William Emmette Coleman accused Helena Blavatsky of plagiarizing from various sources, many of which were from Samuel Fales Dunlap's works, in particular Sōd: the son of the man (1861), Sōd: the mysteries of Adoni (1861), and Vestiges of the spirit-history of man (1858). Coleman's accusations of plagiarism have been analyzed by Winchester (2015), Rudbøg (2012), and Hanegraaff (2017). Winchester (2015) and Hanegraaff (2017) note that Dunlap's works were often compilations of quotations and were not systematically organized; Blavatsky derived much of her content from Dunlap but systematized them into a much more coherent framework.

Dunlap never married and lived in Manhattan with a housekeeper, Rose Ealdon. He was reputed to be a miser and wore shabby clothes, even though he had a large estate worth over $1 million at the time of his death (equivalent to approximately $28,000,000 in 2025). He died on March 31, 1905.

== Works ==
Works by Dunlap:

- The origin of ancient names of countries, cities, individuals, and gods (Metcalf and Company, 1856)
- Vestiges of the spirit-history of man (D. Appleton and Company, 1858)
- Sōd: the mysteries of Adoni (Williams and Norgate, 1861)
- Sōd: the son of the man (Williams and Norgate, 1861)
- The Ghebers of Hebron (Trow Printing Co., 1894; J. W. Bouton, 1898)
