= Martha Haines Butt =

American novelist

Martha Haines Butt Bennett
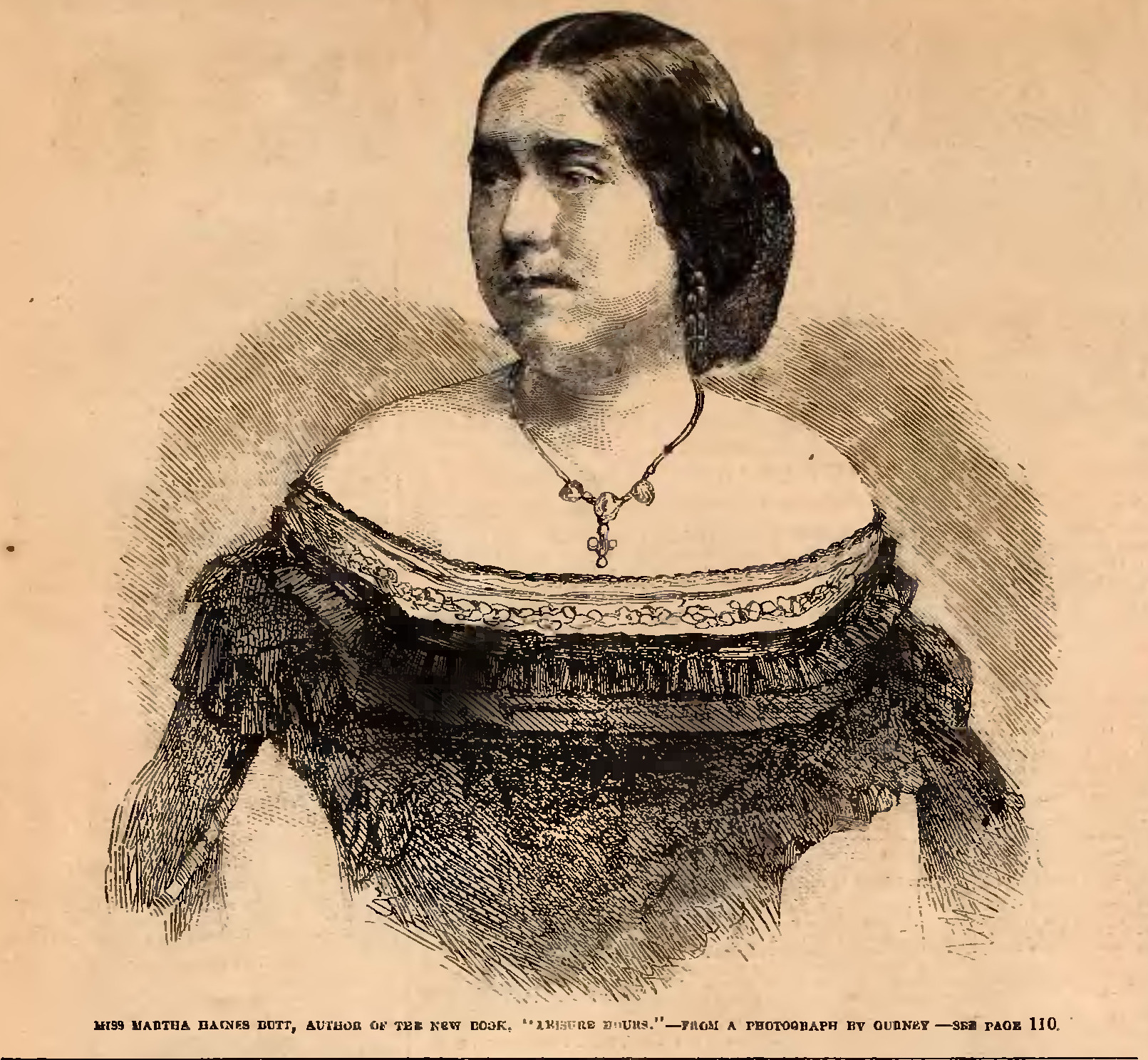
- Born: Martha Haines Butt; November 22, 1833; Norfolk, Virginia, U.S.
- Died: February 9, 1871 (aged 37); New York City, New York, U.S.
- Education: Patapsco Female Institute; Harrisburg Female College
- Occupations: author; suffragist
- Spouse: Nathan Ives Bennett (m. 1865)
- Writing career
- Language: English
- Genres: short stories; essays; sketches
- Notable work: Antifanaticism: A Tale of the South

Martha Haines Butt (after marriage, Bennett; November 22, 1833 – February 9, 1871) was an American proslavery author primarily known by her maiden name. She was a contributor to various periodicals and magazines, in both the North and South. At the age of 19, she published Antifanaticism: A Tale of the South, an 1853 plantation fiction novel. Though she had written anti-woman's rights editorials in the 1850s, by 1870, she supported women's suffrage.

== Biography ==
Martha Haines Butt was born in Norfolk, Virginia, November 22, 1833. She was an only child. Her father, Francis Butt, was of English ancestry; her mother, Mary Ann Morriss Butt, a milliner, was of French ancestry.

During the period of 1847–50, Butt was educated at Patapsco Female Institute in Ellicott's Mills, near Baltimore, and received her diploma there. She was presented with a gold medal and the degree of A. M. (Artium Magister) by Harrisburg Female College.

Butt's first appearance in print was at the age of fourteen, although she had written for several years before that time. Her 1853 novel, Antifanaticism: A Tale of the South, was a proslavery response to Harriet Beecher Stowe's anti-slavery book, Uncle Tom's Cabin. Butt's volume of Leisure Moments was a collection of her short stories, essays, and sketches. Pastimes with Little Friends was published in 1866. Butt was an occasional contributor to the periodical press of the country, and a frequent writer to the Ladies' Home Journal.

On July 6, 1865, in Norfolk, she married Nathan Ives Bennett, of Bridgeport, Connecticut. They lived in Bridgeport before removing to New York City. After marriage, she continued to be primarily known by her maiden name.

In 1870, Butt served as vice president of the Virginia State Woman Suffrage Association.

== Death and legacy ==
Martha Haines Butt died of pneumonia at the Grand Central Hotel, New York City, February 9, 1871.

Butt's arm and hand were copied as a model by the artist William Randolph Barbee, of Virginia, for the statue of the Fisher Girl.

== Selected works ==
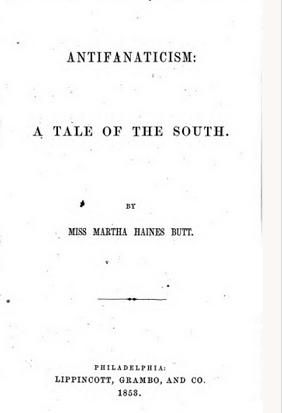
Antifanaticism (1853)

- Antifanaticism: A Tale of the South, 1853
- The Leisure Moments of Miss Martha Haines Butt, A.M., 1860
- Pastimes with My Little Friends, 1866
