= William Emmette Coleman =

American spiritualist (1843–1909)

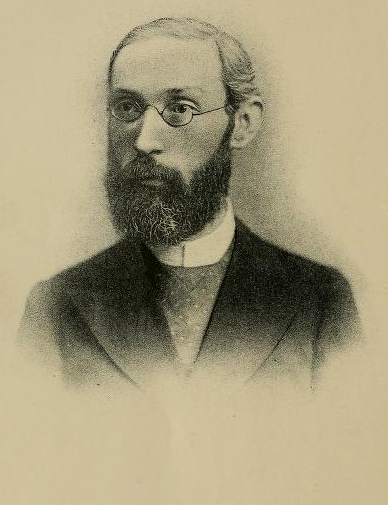
- Born: June 19, 1843; Shadwell, Virginia, US
- Died: April 4, 1909 (aged 65); Alameda, California, US
- Occupation(s): Clerk, Orientalist, writer

William Emmette Coleman (June 19, 1843 – April 4, 1909), also known as W. E. Coleman, an Orientalist, spiritualist, author, and clerk.

== Biography ==
Coleman was born in Shadwell, Virginia on June 19, 1843. He was an assistant librarian of Richmond Public Library (1854–1857). He became a spiritualist at age sixteen.

In 1869, he became assistant chief clerk for General Canby. He was made chief clerk in the Quartermaster office at the Presidio of San Francisco in 1883.

Coleman is best remembered for his criticism of Helena Blavatsky and the claims of Theosophy. He argued in his writings that Blavatsky had plagiarized her ideas from other sources and had stolen quotations. His article "The Sources of Madame Blavatsky's Writings" was published in an appendix to Vsevolod Solovyov's A Modern Priestess of Isis (1895). Coleman demonstrated that Blavatsky's Isis Unveiled was largely plagiarized and included a list of the uncredited sources, including works by American orientalist Samuel Fales Dunlap. He also claimed he was working on a book that would expose Blavatsky's sources for her Book of Dzyan but his notes were destroyed in the 1906 San Francisco earthquake and the book was never published.

== Personal life ==
Coleman married Wilmot Bouton in 1871; she died in 1882.

Coleman has been described as a "radical non-Christian spiritualist". He opposed slavery and supported the separation of church and state. He was a founding board member of the Virginia State Woman Suffrage Association in 1870. He was a member of the American Oriental Society and the Royal Asiatic Society of Great Britain and Ireland.

Coleman died in Alameda, California on April 4, 1909.

== Publications ==
=== Articles ===
- The Frauds of Madame Blavatsky (1891)
- Blavatsky Unveiled (1892)
- Critical Historical Review of The Theosophical Society (1893)
- The Sources of Madame Blavatsky's Writings (1895)

=== Booklets ===
- The Bible God Disproved by Nature (Truthseeker Tracts, no. 55)
- One Hundred and One Reasons Why I am not a Christian Spiritualist (Truthseeker Tracts no. 79)

== See also ==
- Fydell Edmund Garrett
