= Anna Whitehead Bodeker =

American suffragist (1826–1904)

- Born: July 27, 1826; Midland Park, New Jersey, US
- Died: October 26, 1904 (aged 78); Richmond, Virginia, US
- Burial place: Hollywood Cemetery (Richmond, Virginia)
- Occupation: Women's suffragist

Anna Whitehead Bodeker (July 27, 1826 – October 26, 1904) was an American suffragist who led the earliest attempt to organize for women's suffrage in the state of Virginia. Bodeker brought national leaders of the women's suffrage movement to Richmond, Virginia to speak; published newspaper articles to draw attention and supporters to the cause; and helped found the Virginia State Woman Suffrage Association in 1870, the first suffrage association in the state.

== Early life ==
Anna Whitehead was born July 27, 1826, in Midland Park, New Jersey, to English immigrants Jesse and Sophia Whitehead. When she was ten years old, her family move to Richmond, Virginia where her father oversaw the construction of the Manchester Cotton Mill in Manchester. He was superintendent of the mill for several years, and the family lived in a house nearby.

== Women's suffrage activism ==
Bodeker began to follow the work of the National Woman Suffrage Association (NWSA) by the 1860s. On January 26, 1870, Bodeker invited NWSA activist Paulina Kellogg Wright Davis to her home to speak about suffrage in front of an audience of civic leaders, as well as Bodeker's friends and neighbors. After the evening's "impassioned discussion", Bodeker was ready to establish a women's suffrage organization in Richmond. In her report on her trip to Richmond in The Revolution, a pro-suffrage weekly newspaper, Davis called Bodeker brilliant and stated that Bodeker "might reach the whole south." Davis believed Bodeker was capable of leading the women's suffrage movement in the southern states of the U.S.

In March 1870, the Richmond Daily Enquirer published a two-part article written by Bodeker and other Richmond women entitled "Defence [sic] of Woman Suffrage." The article argued that giving women the right to vote would improve their economic opportunities and foster their independence.

At Bodeker's invitation, NWSA organizer Matilda Joslyn Gage addressed a small group of suffrage supporters at a public meeting at Bosher's Hall in Richmond on May 5, 1870. The Virginia State Woman Suffrage Association (VSWSA)—the first women's suffrage association in the state of Virginia—was founded the following evening. Bodeker was elected president.

The Virginia State Woman Suffrage Association soon became officially affiliated with the NWSA and sent Smith as a delegate to represent Virginia at the national convention. With the help of the NWSA, Bodeker and the VSWSA arranged for nationally known suffragists like Susan B. Anthony, Lillie Devereux Blake, Isabella Beecher Hooker, and Josephine Griffing to come to Richmond and speak about suffrage. However, despite their name-recognition, the speakers failed to attract audiences large enough to create lasting support for the suffrage movement.

In May 1871, Anthony appointed Bodeker to the National Woman Suffrage Educational Committee, a team of 34 women tasked with coordinating the association's future efforts. This committee urged NWSA members to vote in the 1871 municipal elections, citing the Fourteenth Amendment and Fifteenth Amendment of the Constitution of the United States. Bodeker did so, arriving at the second precinct of Marshall Ward in Richmond ready to cast her vote. When election officials refused her ballot, Bodeker requested that the following note be placed in the ballot box: "By the Constitution of the United States, I Mrs. A. Whitehead Bodeker, have a right to give my vote at this election, and in vindication of it drop this note in the ballot-box, November 7th, 1871." Bodeker's attempt to vote was covered in the Richmond Times-Dispatch.

In 1872, with the help of delegate George Booker, Bodeker petitioned the General Assembly for legislation giving women the right to vote, again claiming the right of suffrage under the Fourteenth and Fifteenth Amendments. In her petition, Bodeker asked legislators "to pass laws as may, in the wisdom of the general assembly, be deemed sufficient and necessary for enforcing the right of suffrage without regard to sex." She also asked to address the assembly, in person or by proxy, on the subject of women's suffrage. The petition was sent to the Committee for Courts of Justice, but it was ignored by legislators.

Despite Bodeker's widely praised organizing skills, the women's suffrage movement failed to gain traction in Virginia immediately after the Civil War. Women faced pressure to adhere to traditional female roles, and the first female suffragists were deemed radicals. Meanwhile, the VSWSA was viewed publicly as being heavily associated with carpetbaggers and black Republicans, making it difficult to convince whites in Richmond to support its cause. Bodeker stopped her advocacy for women's suffrage after 1872, and the Virginia State Woman Suffrage Association faded from the suffrage movement soon after.

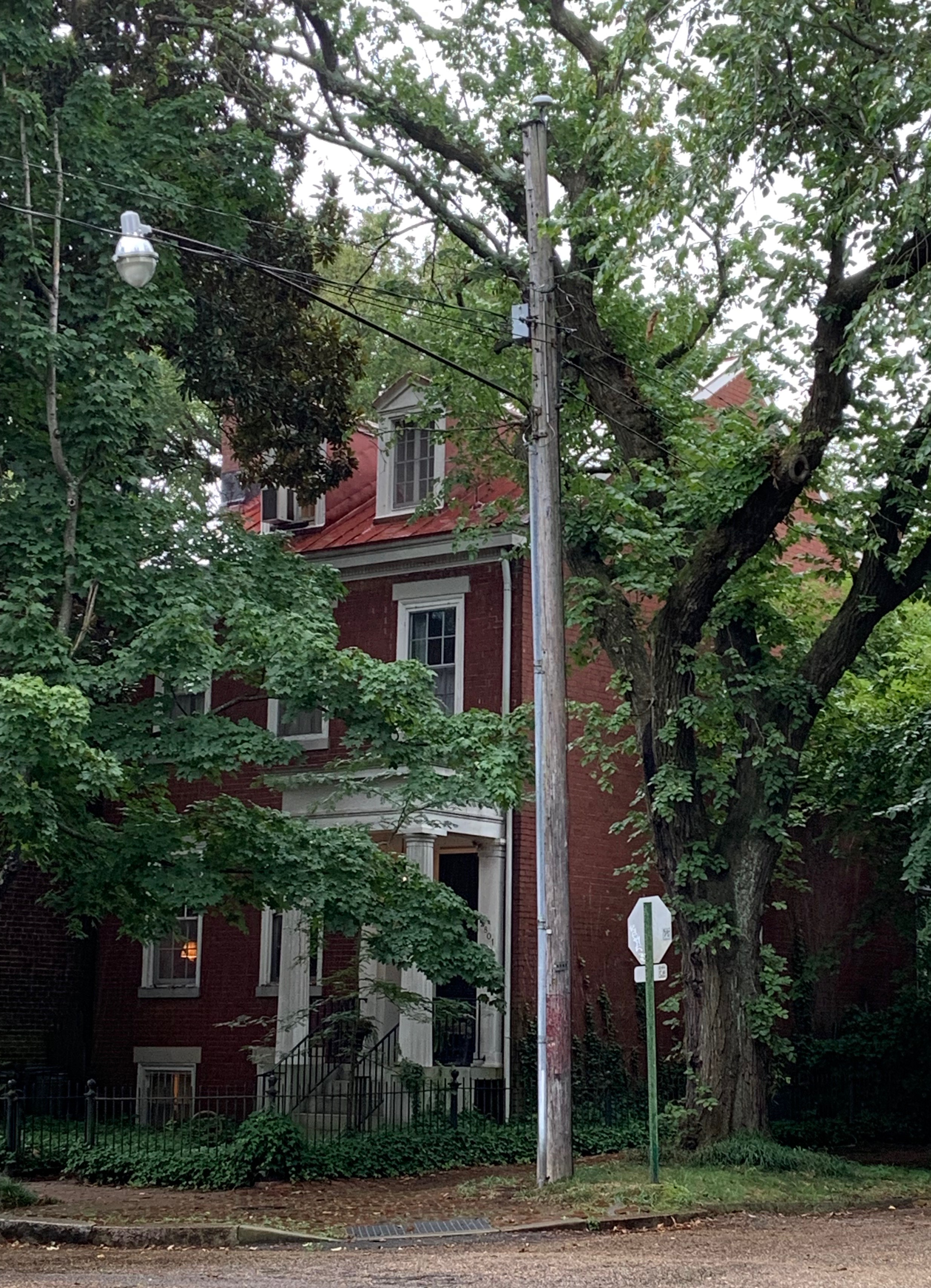
The house on Church Hill in Richmond, where Bodeker lived from 1862 until she died in 1904

== Personal life ==
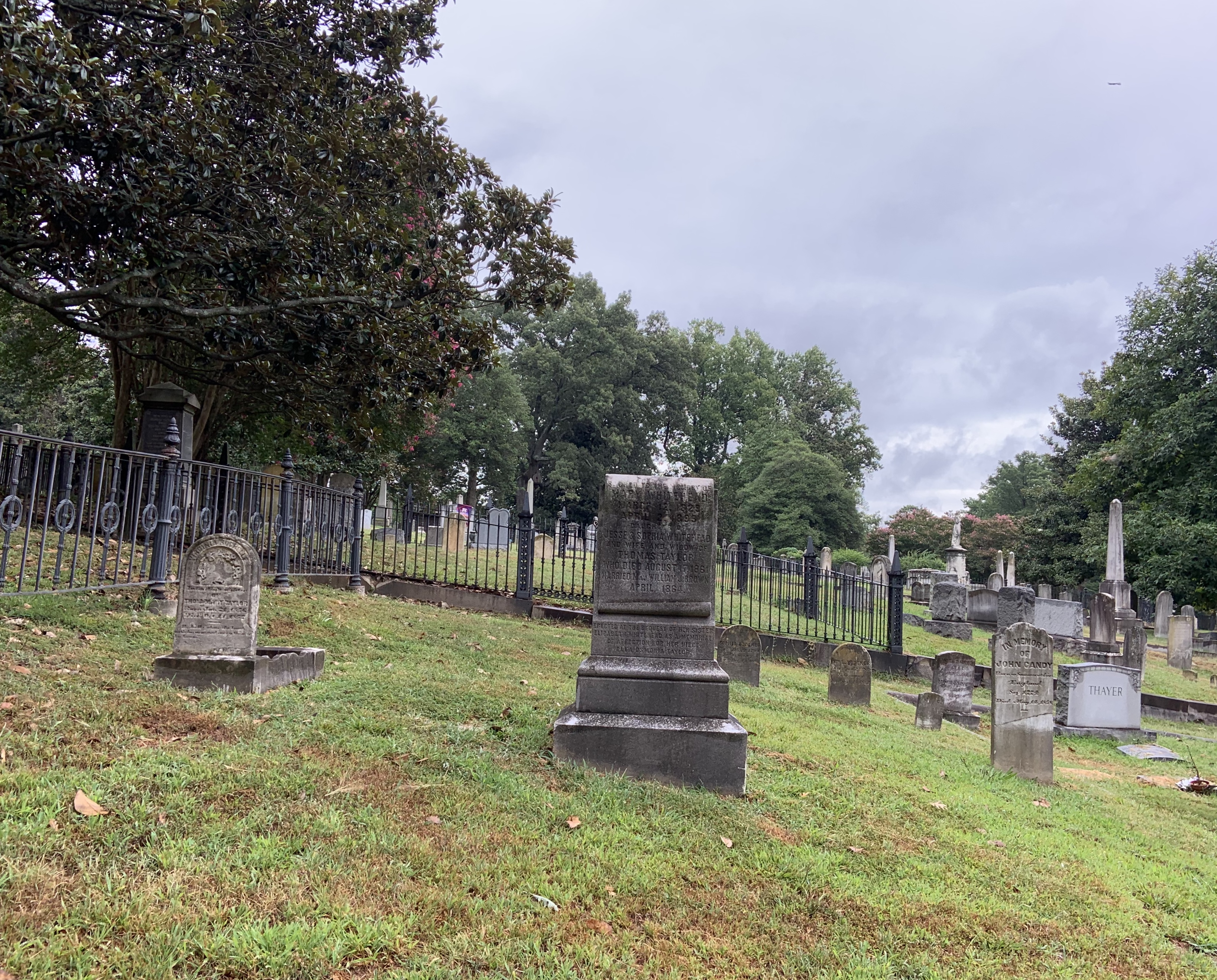
Bodeker family plot in Hollywood Cemetery in Richmond

Anna Whitehead married Augustus Bodeker on January 15, 1846, at age 18. Her husband was a German immigrant who worked as a clerk for a local druggist and would go on to open his own pharmaceutical business, A. Bodeker Apothecary, located on Richmond's Main Street, in 1864. They had three daughters; the first died in infancy. The family lived in Richmond's Church Hill neighborhood, purchasing a two-and-a-half-story house there in 1862. The Bodekers stayed in the Richmond area for much of the duration of the Civil War. Bodeker's husband served in Virginia's House of Delegates during Reconstruction.

Bodeker became involved in spiritualism in late 1871. By 1872, she believed she was a powerful medium. Disturbed by Bodeker's unorthodox views and increasingly erratic behavior, her family admitted her against her will to the Western Lunatic Asylum (now Western State Hospital) in Staunton, Virginia on September 19, 1873. She was released on October 20, 1874, and returned to Richmond.

Bodeker's husband died on July 26, 1884. She lived at the family home, 2801 E. Grace Street, with her daughters, Pearl and Ruby, until her death on October 26, 1904. She was buried at Hollywood Cemetery.

== Honors ==
Bodeker was honored by the Library of Virginia as part of the 2003 class of Virginia Women in History. Here name is featured on the Wall of Honor on the Virginia Women's Monument, located in the Capitol Square in Richmond.

== See also ==
- List of suffragists and suffragettes
- List of women's rights activists
- Timeline of women's suffrage
- Timeline of women's suffrage in the United States
- Women's suffrage organizations
