= Virginia State Woman Suffrage Association =

American women's suffrage organization

- Abbreviation: VSWSA
- Formation: May 6, 1870; 156 years ago
- Founder: Anna Whitehead Bodeker and John C. Underwood
- Founded at: Richmond, Virginia
- Dissolved: 1880; 146 years ago
- Type: NGO
- Purpose: Woman's suffrage
- Location: Richmond, Virginia, United States
- Affiliations: National Woman Suffrage Association

The Virginia State Women Suffrage Association (VSWSA) was the first women's suffrage association in the Commonwealth of Virginia. It was established in 1870 in Richmond, Virginia, with Anna Whitehead Bodeker as its president. The association's other officers included Martha Haines Butt, William Emmette Coleman, Ralza M. Manly, Caroline F. Putnam, John C. Underwood, and Westel Willoughby. Despite an affiliation with the National Woman Suffrage Association, the VSWSA was unsuccessful in capturing the support of the public and politicians in Virginia and ceased operations by 1880.

== History ==
=== Formation ===
In 1870, suffragist Anna Whitehead Bodeker invited National Woman Suffrage Association organizer Matilda Joslyn Gage to Richmond, Virginia. Gage and Bodeker addressed a small group of suffrage supporters at a public meeting at Bosher's Hall in Richmond on May 5, 1870. Gage's speech was about "Opportunities for Women". At the meeting's conclusion, judge John C. Underwood announced an organizational meeting for a state association, to be held the following evening at the United States Courtroom.

Underwood presided over the founding meeting of the Virginia State Woman Suffrage Association (VSWSA) on May 6, 1870. It was the first women's suffrage association in Virginia. At this initial meeting, the founders adopted a constitution, and elected officers. Bodeker was elected the first president of VSWSA. Its other founding officers included:

- Vice president: Martha Haines Butt, writer and novelist
- Vice president: William Emmette Coleman, Orientalist and spiritualist
- Vice president: Ralza M. Manly, minister, Richmond city councilman, and superintendent of education for the Freedman's Bureau in Virginia
- Vice president: John C. Underwood, United States District Court Judge
- Vice president: Maria Underwood, wife of judge Underwood
- Vice president: Andrew Washburne, the first superintendent of Richmond Public Schools
- Vice president: Westel Willoughby, lawyer and Justice of the Supreme Court of Virginia during Congressional Reconstruction
- Vice president: Jennie Rebecca Woodbury, wife of Willoughby
- Secretary: Sue L. F. Smith, daughter of Dr. Rev. William A. Smith, who was president of Randolph-Macon College
- Lysander Hill, attorney in Alexandria, Virginia
- Mrs. Lysander Hill
- Georgianna Smith, wife of Richmond physician E. H. Smith
- Elisa Washburne, wife of Andrew Washburne

Other VSWSA participants were Reverend W. F. Hemenway, Florence Percey, Dr. F. H. Langstedt, and his wife. Elizabeth Van Lew, a Reconstruction-era postmistress and former Union spy, was also a leading member of the association.

The board appointed Sue L. F. Smith as Virginia's delegate to the National Woman Suffrage Association meeting to be held in New York City in May 1870. The association also adopted a resolution noting "that woman is a human being and had all the right and responsibilities of human beings—that marriage does not take from her responsibilities and that she has as much right to vote as a man and that we demand of Congress the Sixteenth Amendment granting the ballot to women."

Matilda Joslyn Gage, who also attended the association's organizational meeting, made a successful motion that VSWSA become to become an auxiliary of the National Women Suffrage Association. The meeting concluded with an speech by Gage.

=== Activities ===
With the help of the NWSA, Bodeker and the VSWSA arranged for nationally known suffragists to speak in Richmond. The association's guest speakers included Susan B. Anthony who made two orations in December 1870, one at the Virginia House of Delegates, and Lillie Devereux Blake who spoke in January 1871. They were followed by Paulina Wright Davis, Josephine Griffing, and Isabella Beecher Hooker who spoke at the United States courtroom on March 7 and 9, 1871, while the Virginia House of Delegates was in session. The VSWSA hosted speakers Matilda Joslyn Gage and Laura de Force Gordon during the 1872 House of Delegates session. Despite their name-recognition, these speakers failed to attract audiences large enough to create lasting support for the suffrage movement in Richmond. However, the speakers did stimulate discussion, with local newspapers publishing many letters to the editor.

=== Dissolution ===
Despite Bodeker's organizational skills, the women's suffrage movement failed to gain traction in Virginia. The VSWSA was viewed publicly as being heavily associated with carpetbaggers and black Republicans, making it difficult to convince Virginia's white population to support its cause. When Bodeker stopped her advocacy for women's suffrage in 1872, she was replaced as the VSWSA president by Caroline F. Putnam, a Massachusetts-born abolitionist who had become a school teacher in Northumberland County, Virginia. The Virginia State Woman Suffrage Association ceased operations by 1880.

== See also ==
- List of suffragists and suffragettes
- List of Virginia suffragists
- List of women's rights activists
- Timeline of women's suffrage
- Timeline of women's suffrage in the United States
- Women's suffrage organizations
