= Westel W. Willoughby =

American academic (1867–1945)

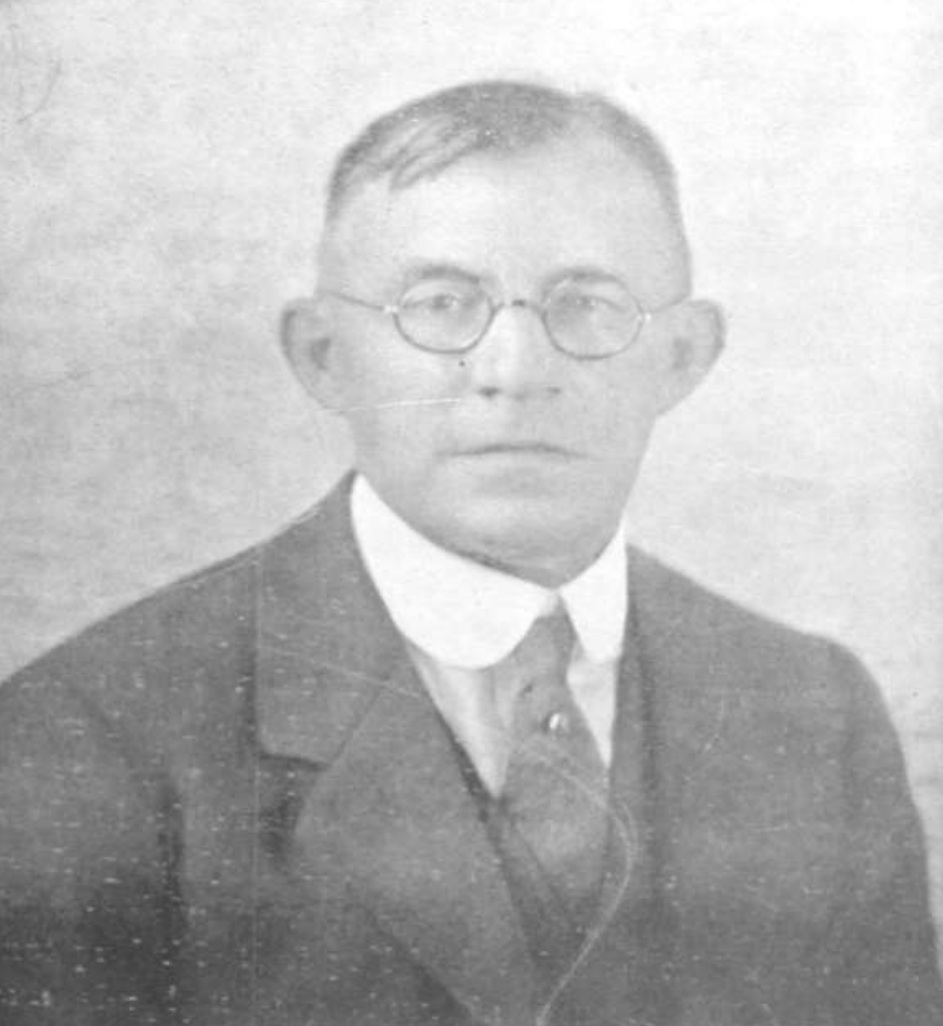

Westel Woodbury Willoughby (20 July 1867–25 March 1945) was an American academic who played an important role in establishing a discipline of political science. He was professor at Johns Hopkins University where he established its first department of political science.

== Early life and education ==
He and his twin brother, William F. Willoughby, were the sons of Westel Willoughby and Jennie Rebecca (Woodbury) Willoughby. Their lawyer father had been a major in the Union Army with the New York Volunteers, and after retiring due to injuries incurred at the Battle of Chancellorsville, he served as a local prosecutor, then briefly as a trial judge and on the Supreme Court of Appeals for Virginia.

Westel Woodbury Willoughby graduated with an A.B. from Johns Hopkins University in the class of 1888, continued with graduate work, and received his Ph.D. from Hopkins in 1891 at a time when political science was not yet recognized as a separate discipline. His degree was awarded by the combined departments of history and economics.

== Academic career ==
After practicing law for a few years with his father in Washington, D.C., Willoughby joined the faculty at Hopkins.

At Willoughby's urging, Johns Hopkins created the first department of political science, with him as the only professor. He continued to lead this department until retiring at the age of 65 in 1932. He helped found the American Political Science Association and served as its 10th president. Some have referred to him as the "father of modern political science" due to his prolific publications.

His first book, The Nature of the State, was published in 1896. In 1900, he published Social Justice. In 1904, he published The American Constitutional System. An Introduction to the Study of the American State. He went on to establish himself as one of the foremost authorities on constitutional law and the workings of the Supreme Court of the United States.

Willoughby was invited as a guest lecturer to China when he responded to a request from the Chinese government in 1917 to assist as a constitutional and legal advisor for a period of one year. As a result of this work, he became a frequent advisor to the Chinese Government, including the Washington Naval Conference in 1921 and the two Opium Conferences in Geneva in 1924–1925 and again in 1931, where Willoughby also served as an advisor to the Chinese delegation to the League of Nations. His numerous writings on China and Japan and their relationships prior to World War II are classics that are still used in education to this day. The Chinese government awarded him the Order of Merit and the Order of the Golden Grain in appreciation for his contribution.

Willoughby retired from Johns Hopkins in 1933. He trained 69 PhD students during his time at Johns Hopkins.

== Personal life ==
On 27 June 1893, he married Grace Robinson, daughter of Franklin Marvin Robinson, a prominent lawyer in Dubuque, Iowa. When he was hired by Johns Hopkins University, he moved to Baltimore's Roland Park neighborhood in Maryland with Grace and their two young children, Westel Robinson Willoughby (Robinson) and Laura Robinson Willoughby.

Grace, who predeceased him by nearly 30 years, died in 1907 at the age of 36 and was buried at Linwood Cemetery in her hometown of Dubuque. Willoughby raised his two young children alone and never remarried. Along with his twin brother William Franklin Willoughby, an accomplished economist and political scientist, he bought a small island called Endiang on Stoney Lake north of Toronto in 1908, where both families spent their summers.

He lived in Chevy Chase, Maryland.

Willoughby continued to live in Baltimore until his death on 25 March 1945.
