= Westel Willoughby =

American lawyer and soldier (1830–1897)

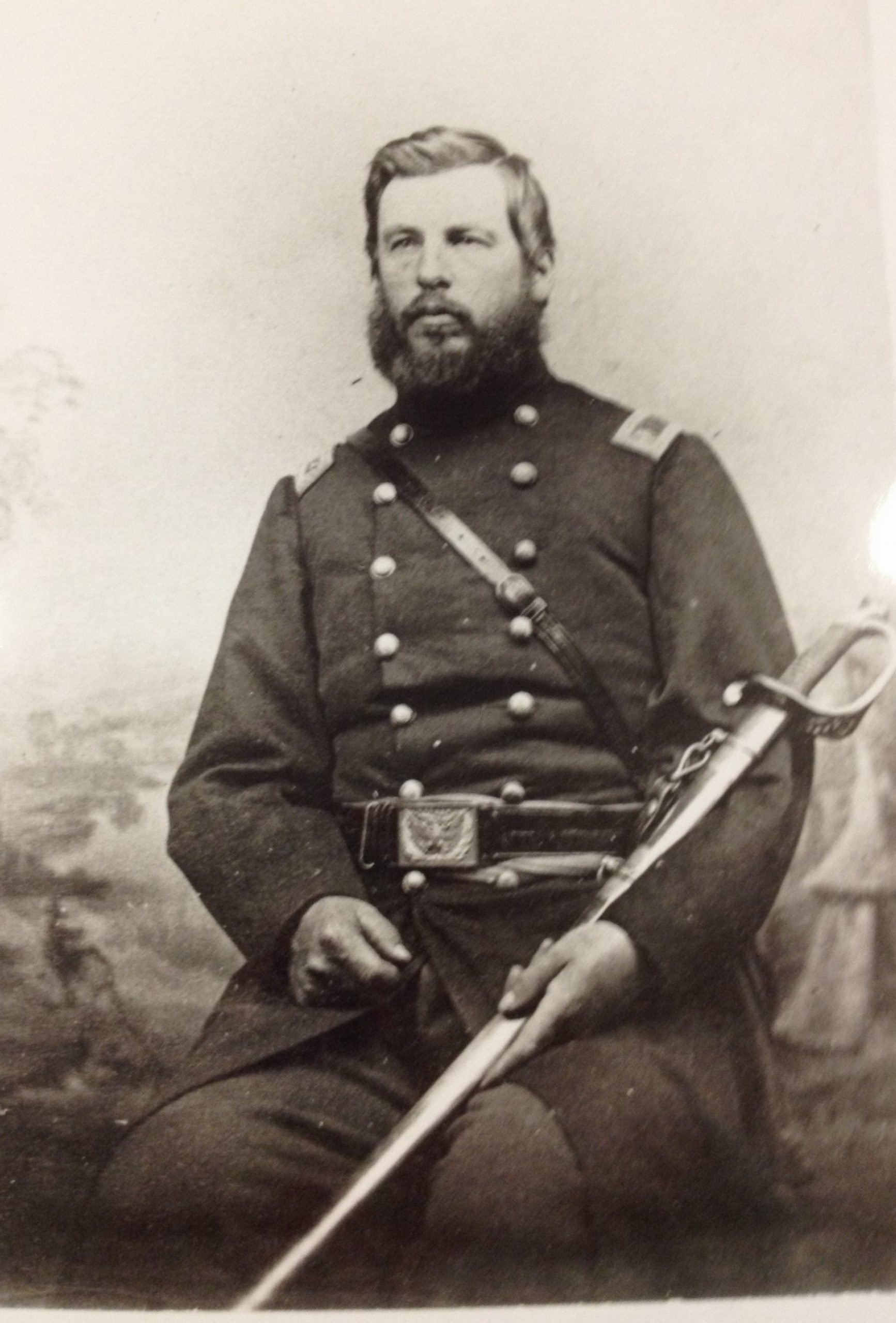
- Photographic portrait of Westel Willoughby as an officer in the 137th New York Volunteer Regiment

Justice of the Supreme Court of Virginia
- In office June 12, 1869 – January 1, 1870

Personal details
- Born: April 3, 1830 Groton, Tompkins County, New York, U.S.
- Died: December 21, 1897 (aged 67) Washington, D.C.
- Party: Republican
- Spouse: Jennie Rebecca Woodbury
- Education: Hamilton College

Military service
- Allegiance: United States
- Years of service: 1862-1863
- Unit: 137th New York Volunteers
- Battles/wars: Battle of Chancellorsville (1863)

Westel Willoughby (April 3, 1830 – December 21, 1897) was an American lawyer and soldier, who briefly served on the Virginia Supreme Court during Congressional Reconstruction, and unsuccessfully ran for statewide office several times.

== Early life ==
Westel Willoughby was born on April 3, 1830, in Groton, Tompkins County, New York, to Franklin Bakus Willoughby and his wife Keziah Slosson Delano. He attended schools in Groton and Homer, in Cortland County, then attended Hamilton College. He taught and worked as a carpenter to support himself during those studies and graduated in 1854. He studied law while teaching at academies in Aurora and Moravia, both in nearby Cayuga County.

== Career ==
Willoughby was admitted to the New York bar at Oswego. He then began his private legal practice back home in Groton.

=== American Civil War ===
During the American Civil War, Willoughby helped recruit soldiers for the 137th New York Volunteer Regiment and received an officer's commission on November 1, 1862. At the Battle of Chancellorsville on May 3, 1863, he was severely wounded in an artillery barrage. Willoughby recovered enough for release from the hospital but resigned from his commission due to his injuries in September.

=== Virginia prosecutor, judge, and politician ===
Willoughby remained in Union-occupied Alexandria, Virginia, and was admitted to the Virginia bar. In 1864, he won the election and on July 5, 1864, assumed office as Alexandria's Commonwealth Attorney (a/k/a prosecutor, including for the portions which later became Arlington County). In May 1866, local judge H. W. Thomas refused to allow an African American woman to testify as a witness against a white man, citing old state law. Willoughby appealed to the federal court and secured an indictment against Judge Thomas (who had reported years earlier that barred the Fairfax courthouse doors to intimidate Unionist voters) for violating the witness' civil rights. Willoughby also allowed African Americans to sit on juries.

During Congressional Reconstruction, Major General John Schofield dismissed Judge Thomas and other judges pursuant to a new federal statute that forbade all former Confederates from holding state offices. Willoughby was appointed to replace Judge Thomas on March 22, 1869, as judge of the Ninth Circuit, which encompassed Alexandria, Fairfax, Fauquier, Loudoun, Prince William, Rappahannock, and Stafford counties. On June 3, Schofield dismissed all three members of the Court of Appeals of Virginia (which later became the Virginia Supreme Court) due to that new law. Schofield appointed Willoughby and two other former Union Officers to that body. When the new Virginia Constitution of 1869 was adopted, he was allowed to remain in office until the General Assembly reorganized the state judiciary. The Court on which he sat met from June 22 to 28, October 12, 1869, and finally from January 11 to February 25, 1870. Judge Willoughby wrote 6 of the 8 opinions it issued.

Willoughby then became a director of the Virginia Peat Company and also resumed his private legal practice in Alexandria. In 1871 he became the Republican candidate for state senate but lost. Later that year, he and Charles Whittlesey formed a partnership specializing in seeking reimbursement from the recently created Southern Claims Commission for Union supporters. The federal government also hired the firm to defend seizures of property from Confederate supporters, including Arlington House, previously owned by Washington descendant George Washington Custis Lee, whose daughter married Confederate General Robert E. Lee, and which had become Arlington National Cemetery. Willoughby also ran to become a member of Alexandria's city council in 1873 as a Radical Republican and lost.

Willoughby became a director of the East Fairmont Gas, Coal, and Coke Company of West Virginia in 1876. He was nominated again in 1881 as the Republican nominee for Attorney General but withdrew from consideration. In 1884, he campaigned for Republican Presidential candidate James G. Blaine, who lost.

=== Later legal practice ===
He had previously conducted some of his legal practice across the Potomac River in Washington, D.C. He moved there in 1887. Willoughby also taught real property law in 1889 and 1890 at the National University Law School (that later became part of George Washington University). In 1884, he became vice president of the Arlington-Breckenridge Mining Company, and in 1897 president of the Columbia Dredging and Construction Company.

== Personal life ==
On May 10, 1859, Willoughy married schoolteacher Jennie Rebecca Woodbury in Groton. They would have twin sons Westel Woodbury Willoughby (1867–1945) and William F. Willoughby (1867-1960) and a daughter. Their sons both became prominent academics and public administrators. Mr. and Mrs. Willoughby were active in the Presbyterian Church and both served on the board of the Virginia State Woman Suffrage Association in 1870. and Willoughby was also involved in the YMCA.

Westel Willoughby died at his home in Washington, D.C., on December 21, 1897, and was returned across the Potomac River and buried at Arlington National Cemetery two days later.
