= Literary societies at Washington & Jefferson College =

Literary societies at Washington & Jefferson College played an important role in its academics and student life, especially during the 18th and 19th century. Washington & Jefferson College is a private liberal arts college in Washington, Pennsylvania, which is located in the Pittsburgh metropolitan area. The college traces its origin to three log cabin colleges in Washington County, Pennsylvania established by three frontier clergymen in the 1780s: John McMillan, Thaddeus Dod, and Joseph Smith. These early schools eventually grew into two competing colleges, with Jefferson College in Canonsburg, Pennsylvania being chartered in 1802 and Washington College being chartered in 1806. These two schools merged in 1865 to form Washington & Jefferson College.

The history of literary societies at Washington & Jefferson College dates back to 1797, when the Franklin Literary Society and the Philo Literary Society were founded at Canonsburg Academy. Two other literary societies were founded at Washington College, the Union Literary Society in 1809 and the Washington Literary Society in 1814. Typical early activities include the presentation of dialogues, translations of passages from Greek or Latin classics, and extemporaneous speaking. Later, the literary societies began to present declamations. Each society maintained independent libraries for the use of their members, each of which rivaled the holdings of their respective colleges. These four college literary societies had intense rivalries with each other, competing in "contests", which pitted select society members against another in "compositions, speaking select orations and debating," with the trustees selecting the victor. Because the two colleges never met each other in athletic contests, these literary competitions were the main outlet for their rivalry. In the years after the union of the two colleges, these four literary societies merged with the Franklin Literary Society, which survives today.

== Founding and operation ==
The literary societies at Washington & Jefferson College, and its predecessors Jefferson College, Washington College, Canonsburg Academy, and Washington Academy, developed in order to make students more familiar with debate, literature, oratory, and writing. According to W.M. McClelland, Professor of English Language and Literature at Washington & Jefferson College, the literary societies existed to "make young men in college familiar with parliamentary rules, with the perennial themes of human discussion, and to give them a readier use of their mother tongue." Typical early activities include the presentation of dialogues, translations of passages from Greek or Latin classics, and extemporaneous speaking. Later, the literary societies began to present declamations.

In their early stages, all of the societies were secret, with revelations to the outside incurring fines and banishment. Other infractions could incur fines, including the use of profanity, the wearing of boots, quoting scripture during debate, and whittling. At Washington, fines were levied against any student presenting "any ludicrous piece calculated merely to excite laughter." Each society maintained independent libraries for the use of their members. At various times, members of the societies feared that their collection would be confiscated by the administration. Critics of the Washington and Union Literary Societies complained that their members frequented taverns too frequently.

While the societies held rivalries with each other, Franklin men were seen as puritans, Philos the cavaliers, Washington having the intellectualism, and Union the pious ones, steps were taken to maintain a semblance of parity. Washington and Union agreed not to admit any additional members, if the number of members in one society exceeded the other by more than five. Conversely, Philo denied membership to a number of men during a period when Franklin's membership was low. Following the enrollment decline during the Civil War and the union of the two colleges in 1865, Franklin and Philo merged to form Franklin, and Washington and Union merged to form Union. By 1885, all literary societies had merged their libraries with the College's.

While Washington College and Jefferson College had a rivalry prior to their union in 1865, the two colleges never faced each other in athletic contests. Instead, the rivalry expressed itself in the literary field.

== Debate and contest ==
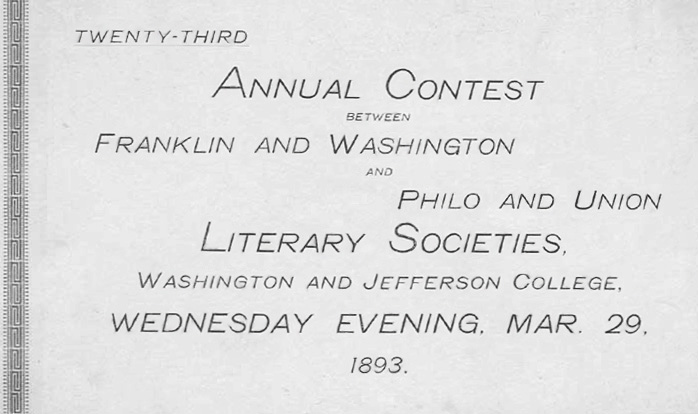
Cover of the playbill for the 1893 Contest. The debate that year was over the proposition of "Resolved: That the National Government should Appropriate Money to the States for Educational Purposes in Proportion to Illiteracy."

It was debate, both intra-society and between competing societies, that was the focus of attention. Debates topics ranged from "Ought females to receive a liberal education?" at Washington in 1817, to "Would the removal of Jefferson College to Washington be a public advantage?" at Philo in 1817. The question of "Is female modesty natural or artificial?," debated at one of the first meetings of Franklin, was decided to be "natural." On the question of "Are spirituous liquors of advantage to society?" Charles Lucas argued the "Yea" position. Among student, intra-society awards for skill at debate were more esteemed than being named first in one's graduating class.

While intra-society debate was popular, the inter-society "contest" was the "day of destiny and of absorbing interest" in campus life. Contests pitted select society members against another in public debate, composition, and oratory. The first contest was in August 1799, when Philo challenged Franklin to contest of "compositions, speaking select orations and debating" to take place before the trustees, who would select the victor. At times, contests became raucous affairs, with oratories punctuated by yells of objection from the crowd, like "I'd like to know on what basis?" The contest topics includes serious discussions like "Does belief in moral truth necessarily incite to fulfilling moral obligation?," causing some of the more droll members to propose non-nonsensical topics, like "Could a chimera ruminating in a vacuum devour second intentions?." Future Copperhead Congressman Clement Vallandigham and future Chief Justice of the Supreme Court of Pennsylvania Ulysses Mercur famously debated the question of succession, with Mercur being declared the victor.

== Pre-merger societies at Jefferson College ==
=== Franklin Literary Society ===
The first recorded meeting of the Franklin Literary Society was held on November 14, 1797 at Canonsburg Academy, later Jefferson College. Among the founders were James Carnahan, Cephas Dodd (son of College Founder Thaddeus Dod), Jacob Lindley, Stephen Lindley, James Galbraith, Thomas Hughes, David Imbrie, William Wood and William Wick. The early society was governed under United States Senate parliamentary rules. It modeled itself after debating societies and kept its activities secret. Its stated purpose was to “cultivate and promote science and literature with friendship and morality among members.”.

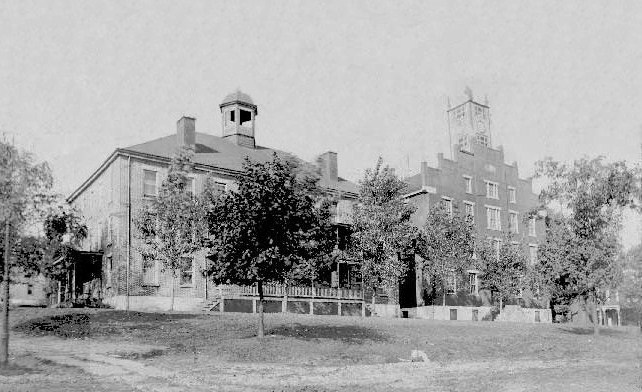
A view of Jefferson College in the 1830s, showing Providence Hall

In addition to the traditional debates and writings, the early Franklin meetings includes spelling contests. The Franklin library began collecting books for its library in 1799. As of 1859, its collection totaled 3,679 volumes, which was more than the Jefferson College library, which had 2,000.

In 1810, Henry Christopher McCook wrote "Observations on Spiders" for the Franklin Society, a prescient foreshadowing of his future contributions to the study of insects. The high point for participation in the Franklin Society was during the 1840s to 1860s. In 1836, a 27-year-old Edgar Allan Poe accepted an offer to become an honorary member of Franklin, well before he rose to prominence. The fraternity Phi Gamma Delta was founded in 1848 by a splinter group of Franklin Literary Society members.

The Franklin Literary Society Hall was located in Providence Hall, the northern building on the campus of Jefferson College. It had a rostrum, with old-fashioned railings and desks. As of 1920, the old Franklin Literary Society Hall was used by the Monday Night Club, an organization of Canonsburg residents who objected to the union of Jefferson and Washington Colleges. Members of this club includes W. F. Brown, former professor at Jefferson and grandson of Matthew Brown. A number of books from the old Franklin and Philo Libraries, as well as the Jefferson library, remained in Canonsburg until at least the 1920s. The old Franklin Literary Society Hall is preserved today by the Jefferson College Historical Society within the Canonsburg Middle School, where its serves as a museum, with many of the original furnishing, paintings, and furniture of the original Hall.

=== Philo Literary Society ===
While the Philo Society of Canonsburg Academy, later Jefferson College, claimed to have been founded in 1796, the only confirmation for that date was the inscription on the marble gavel block. The first recorded meeting was on August 23, 1797 at the stone college building in Canonsburg. The 12 founding members included William McMillan and John Watson, Samuel Tate, Robert Johnston, James Satterfield, John M. Lain, Elisha McCurdy, William Fowler, John Boggs, Robert Lee, W. Moorehead, and Joseph Smith. Joseph Stockton was another early member. Because secret societies were frowned upon, as they were suspected of having ties to Freemasonry or witchcraft, the early members used their cloaks to cover the windows during meetings. In 1805, the society began acquiring books for its library, selling subscriptions to members for $1 to $4.

Inspector reports from the 1840s describe "elaborate memorials, sometimes amusingly bombastic and as long as an ordinary sermon" at meetings. By 1853, orations and debates had become rare, and the Philo Society's newspaper, Iris, contained "too much that betrays no refined taste has found its way into its columns." In 1854, the eparch denounced the Iris as having "degenerated from its pristine excellence," and becoming only "the receptacle of low buffoonery and abuse." As of 1859, its collection totaled 4,029 volumes, which was more than the Jefferson College library, which had 2,000.

By 1920, the old Philo Literary Society Hall in Canonsburg was used as a historical room and museum.

== Pre-merger societies at Washington College ==
=== Union Literary Society ===
The Union Literary Society was founded at Washington College on November 10, 1809. The founding members were Jonathan Kearsley, Andrew Stewart, Joseph B. Becket, John Stephenson, Thomas S. Cunningham, and John McKennan. The first scribe was Andrew Stewart. Jonathan Kearsley was the first President. Its motto was "Deo juvante in ardua nitimur."Henry A. Wise, Henry Stanbery, and Thomas McKean Thompson McKennan were members.

=== Washington Literary Society ===
The Washington Literary Society was founded at Washington College on February 22, 1814. Its founding members were Alexander Gilleland, Francis Julius LeMoyne, William Heaton, James Page, A.O. Patterson, Robert McLean, Andrew Page, Jacob Wolf. Its motto was "Doctrina vim promovet insitam." It was disbanded in 1824, but revived shortly thereafter under the same constitution. An early constitution stated that its purpose was to encourage "literature, love and unanimity." The literary endeavors included contests for original poetry. In the 1840s and 1850s, literary works were submitted via an anonymous box. By rule, submissions that were "hurtful to the feelings of any member of the society" were prohibited. Every graduating member had to give a valedictory address. In 1834, the library held 1279 volumes. In order to prevent the college from taking control of its library, Washington Literary Society obtained a charter from the Pennsylvania House of Representatives. James Blaine was a member.

=== Jackson Literary Society ===
Jackson Literary Society was a short-lived literary society at Washington College during the 1830s.

== Post-merger societies ==
Following the merger of the two colleges to form Washington & Jefferson College in 1865, Franklin merged with Washington to form Franklin and Washington Literary Society. A short time later, the name returned to Franklin Literary Society. At some time in the 20th century, the society had become inactive, only to be reformed in 1952, with the goal of reigniting the “age old tradition of presenting faculty and student discussions on literature and closely related liberal arts.” Throughout the 1950s and 1960s, the Franklin Literary Society presented talks, plays, and discussions on literary subjects. During the 2000s, the society hosted Margaret Atwood, Isaac Bashevis Singer, and Richard Wilbur. It also presented symposia on topics ranging from Edgar Allan Poe to William Faulkner and hosted other English department functions. In 1997, the society marked its 200th anniversary with performances by a fife and drum corps and an actor portraying Ben Franklin, as well as a sword-cut birthday cake.
