= List of presidents of Washington & Jefferson College =

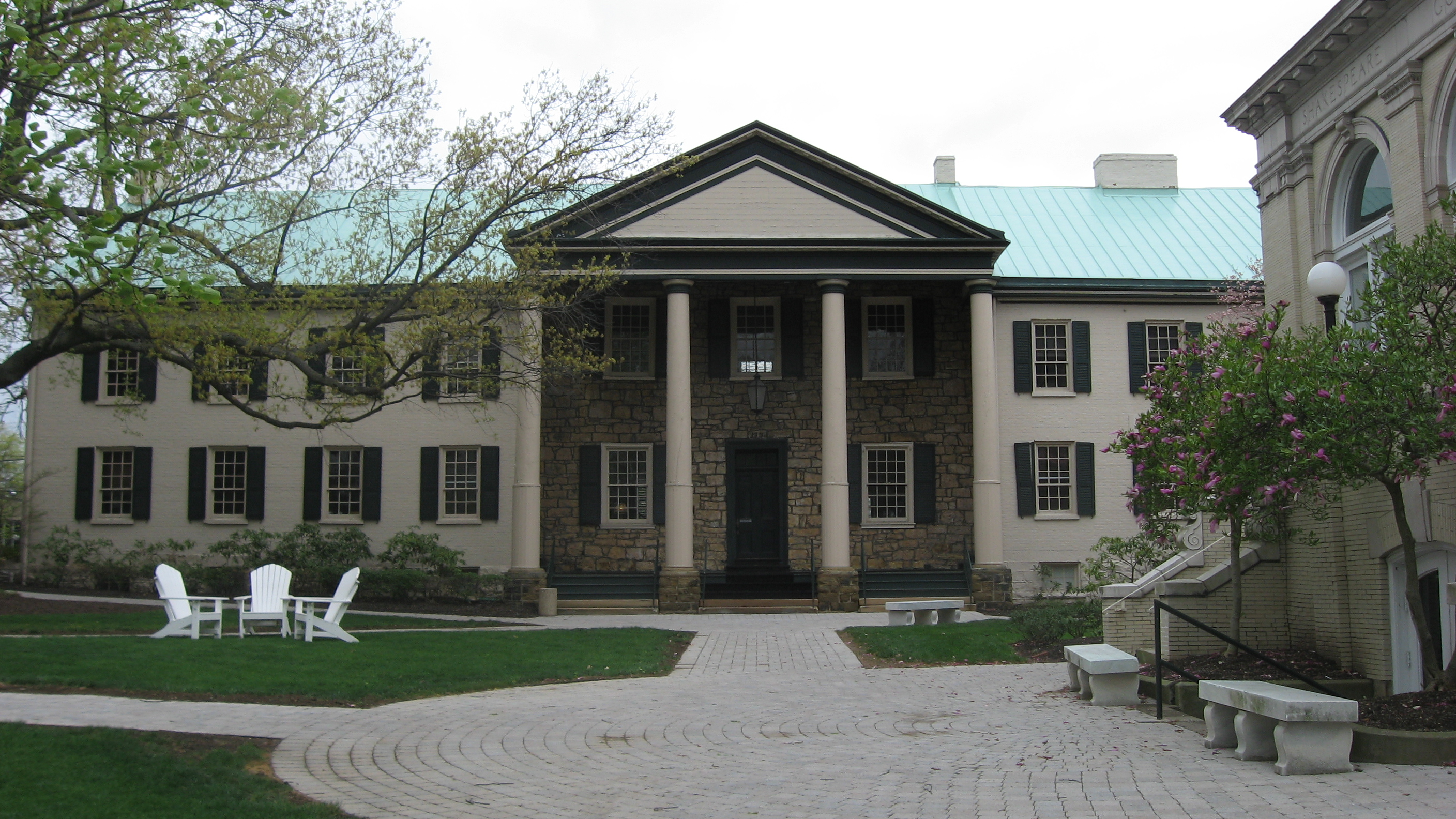
McMillan Hall, an historic building that houses the Office of the President

Washington & Jefferson College is a private liberal arts college in Washington, Pennsylvania, which is located in the Pittsburgh metropolitan area. The college traces its origin to three log cabin colleges in Washington County established by three Presbyterian missionaries to the American frontier in the 1780s: John McMillan, Thaddeus Dod, and Joseph Smith. These early schools eventually grew into two competing academies and colleges, with Canonsburg Academy, later Jefferson College, located in Canonsburg and Washington Academy, later Washington College, in Washington. These two colleges merged in 1865 to form Washington & Jefferson College.

The Office of the President is located in McMillan Hall, which is the oldest building on campus, dating to 1793. Prior to 1912, the Office of the President was located in Old Main, taking the two rooms on either side of that building's main entrance. The President's House is a 17-room Victorian mansion on East Wheeling Street between the Clark Family Library and the Burnett Center. It was built in 1892 by the Duncan family and is an archetypical Queen Anne Victorian style building, with ornate "gingerbread" details, stained and beveled glass, recessed doors and windows, and louvered wooden shutters.

The president is the chief executive officer of the college. According to the Washington & Jefferson College Charter, the president of the college is elected by the Board of Trustees, who can also remove him or her at will. The person holding this office must be an American citizen and is also considered to be a member of the teaching faculty. No one may be excluded from holding the presidency on "account of the religious sect or denomination to which he belongs or adheres, provided he shall demean himself in a soberly, orderly manner, and conform to the lawful rules and regulations of the college."

Two men, Andrew Wylie and Matthew Brown, each served as president of both Jefferson College and Washington College. Several early presidents of Jefferson College had close ties to John McMillan, including his son-in-law John Watson and his nephew William McMillan. James Dunlap was one of McMillan's early students. Other Jefferson College presidents held strong bonds with Matthew Brown, including his son Alexander Blaine Brown and his protégé and son-in-law David Hunter Riddle. James I. Brownson, who was a long-time pastor at the First Presbyterian Church, served two separate terms as president pro tempore, once for Washington College and later for Washington & Jefferson College. During World War II, Ralph Cooper Hutchison simultaneously served as president of the college and as Director of Civilian Defense for the Commonwealth of Pennsylvania. Boyd Crumrine Patterson was the most recent Washington & Jefferson alumnus to serve as president. In 2005, Tori Haring-Smith became the first woman to serve as president.

== Founding and early leadership ==
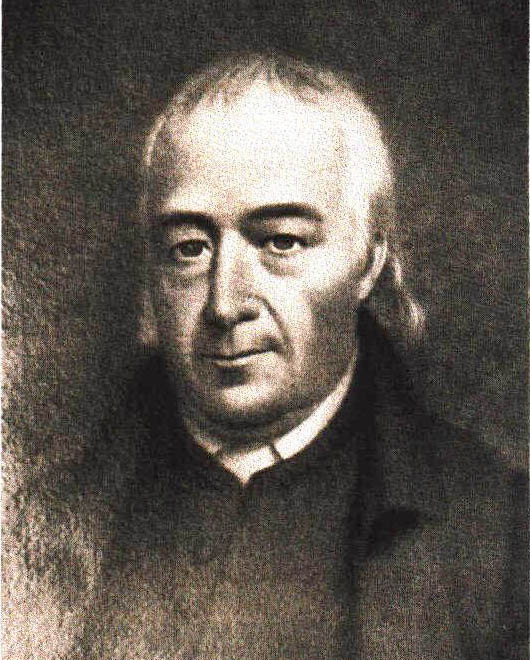
One of the three college founders, John McMillan

Washington & Jefferson College originates from three log cabin colleges established by John McMillan, Thaddeus Dod, and Joseph Smith, Presbyterian missionaries to the American frontier in the 1780s. John McMillan came to present-day Washington County in 1775 and built his college in 1780 near his church in Chartiers, where he taught a mixture of college-level students and elementary students. Thaddeus Dod built his college in Lower Ten Mile in 1781, teaching mathematics and the classics. Joseph Smith taught classical studies in his college, called "The Study" at Buffalo.

In 1787, Washington Academy was officially chartered, and Thaddeus Dod was named the first principal on January 20, 1789, a position he held until July 1790. He was succeeded by David Johnson, who left for Canonsburg in July 1791. While the Washington Academy Board of Trustees still met during the period of unrest following the Whiskey Act and the subsequent Whiskey Rebellion, educational activities at the academy were essentially at a standstill. James Dobbins took control of the school between 1796 and 1801. Benjamin Mills followed, serving as principal from 1801 to 1805. In 1806, Matthew Brown began his term that would end later that year with the chartering of Washington College.

Efforts to found the school that would become Canonsburg Academy began in October 1791. David Johnson was brought to Canonsburg from Washington Academy in July 1791. He taught several students there for a few years, before leaving in 1793. In 1798, John McMillan became the next person to hold the title of principal, then a largely ceremonial position. In 1802, the academy was chartered as "Jefferson College."

== Presidents of Jefferson College ==
- A "–" indicates that the individual served as president pro tempore.

#	Image	Name	Term begin	Term end	Notes	References
1		John Watson (1771–1802)	August 29, 1802	November 30, 1802 (Note: In the interim between John Watson's death and James Dunlap's election, John McMillan managed the operations of Jefferson College.)	Tutored by John McMillan and attended Canonsburg Academy	
2		James Dunlap (1744–1818)	April 27, 1803	April 25, 1811		
3		Andrew Wylie (1789–1851)	April 29, 1812	April 1816	Graduate of Jefferson College (1810); later served as president of Washington College (1817–1828)	
4		William McMillan (1777–1832)	September 24, 1817	August 14, 1822	Graduate of Jefferson College (1802)	
5		Matthew Brown (1776–1853)	September 25, 1822	September 27, 1845	Previously served as president of Washington College (1806–1817)	
6		Robert Jefferson Breckinridge (1800–1871)	January 2, 1845	June 9, 1847	Declined offer to assume the presidency of the united Washington & Jefferson College in 1865	
7		Alexander Blaine Brown (1808–1863)	October 14, 1847	August 1856		
8		Joseph Alden (1807–1885)	January 7, 1857	November 4, 1862		
9		David Hunter Riddle (1805–1888)	November 4, 1862	March 4, 1865 (Note: Riddle and Scott were in office until the creation of the unified Washington & Jefferson College, which was chartered on March 4, 1865.)	Graduate of Jefferson College (1823)	

== Presidents of Washington College ==
#	Image	Name	Term begin	Term end	Notes	References
1		Matthew Brown (1776–1853)	December 16, 1806	April 30, 1817	Later served as president of Washington College (1822–1845)	
2		Andrew Wylie (1789–1851)	April 30, 1817	December 9, 1828	Graduate of Jefferson College (1810); previously served as president of Jefferson College (1813–1816)	
3		David Elliott (1787–1874)	September 28, 1830	November 7, 1831		
4		David McConaughy (1775–1852)	December 21, 1831	September 27, 1849		
5		James Clark (1812–1892)	May 6, 1850	July 13, 1852		
–		James I. Brownson (1817–1899)	July 13, 1852	September 20, 1853	Graduate of Washington College (1835); later served as president pro tempore of Washington & Jefferson College (1870)	
6		John W. Scott (1807–1897)	November 10, 1852	March 4, 1865	Graduate of Jefferson College (1827)	

== Presidents of Washington & Jefferson College ==
#	Image	Name	Term begin	Term end	Notes	References
1		Jonathan Edwards (1817–1891)	April 4, 1866	April 20, 1869		
–		Samuel J. Wilson (1828–1883)	April 20, 1869	August 4, 1869	Graduate of Washington College (1852)	
–		James I. Brownson (1817–1899)	February 1, 1870	August 3, 1870	Graduate of Washington College (1835); previously served as president pro tempore of Washington (1852–1853)	
2		George P. Hays (1838–1897)	August 3, 1870	June 20, 1881	Graduate of Jefferson College (1857)	
3		James D. Moffat (1846–1916)	November 16, 1881	January 1, 1915	Graduate of Washington & Jefferson College (1869)	
4		Frederick W. Hinitt (1866–1927)	January 4, 1915	June 30, 1918		
–		William E. Slemmons (1855–1939)	May 1918	June 1919		
5		Samuel Charles Black (1869–1921)	April 18, 1919	July 15, 1921		
6		Simon Strousse Baker (1866–1932)	(Acting from July 15, 1921) January 26, 1922	May 13, 1931	Graduate of Washington & Jefferson College (1892)	
7		Ralph Cooper Hutchison (1898–1966)	November 13, 1931	May 7, 1945		
8		James Herbert Case, Jr. (1906–1965)	May 4, 1946	March 25, 1950		
9		Boyd Crumrine Patterson (1902–1988)	March 24, 1950	June 30, 1970	Graduate of Washington & Jefferson College (1923)	
10		Howard Jerome Burnett (1929–2019)	July 1, 1970	June 30, 1998		
11		Brian C. Mitchell (born 1953)	June 2, 1998	July 1, 2004		
–		G. Andrew Rembert	March 5, 2004	December 31, 2004		
12		Tori Haring-Smith	January 1, 2005	August 1, 2017		
13		John C. Knapp (born 1959)	August 1, 2017	June 30, 2024		
14		Elizabeth MacLeod Walls (born 1974)	June 30, 2024	present	Selection announced on February 27, 2024	
