= Alexander Blaine Brown =

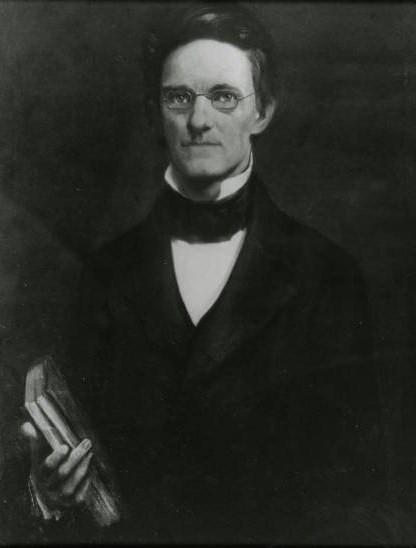
- Born: August 1, 1808; Washington, Pennsylvania
- Died: July 29, 1863 (aged 54)
- Education: Allegheny College
- Church: Presbyterian
- Ordained: October 1831
- Offices held: 7thpresident of Jefferson College (1847–1856)

Alexander Blaine Brown was elected the seventh president of Jefferson College on October 14, 1847. The son of Matthew Brown, Jefferson College's fifth president, Brown was professor of belles lettres and adjunct professor of languages from 1841 to 1847. Under his presidency the college continued to prosper and in 1852 Phi Kappa Psi fraternity was founded at Jefferson College. Brown resigned in August 1856 due to ill health.

== Selected works ==
- Brown, Alexander Blaine; John MacLean; Matthew Boyd Hope (1858). Letters on the True Relations of Church and State to Schools and Colleges. J. T. Robinson.

Academic offices
Preceded by Robert Jefferson Breckinridge	President of Jefferson College; 1847–1856	Succeeded by Joseph Alden
