= William L. Alden =

American lawyer

William Livingston Alden
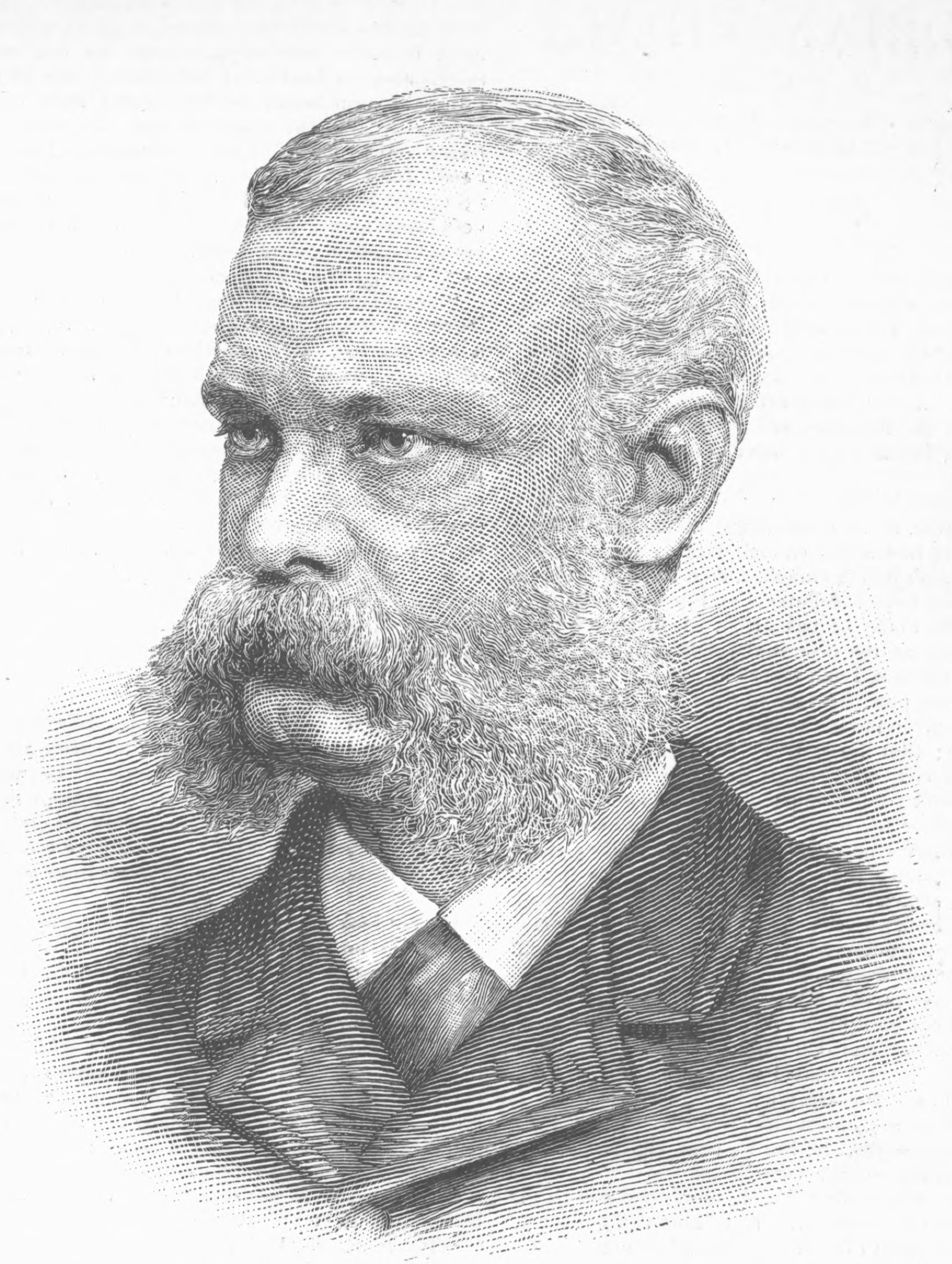
- Born: October 9, 1837; Williamstown
- Died: January 14, 1908 (aged 70); Buffalo
- Alma mater: Lafayette College; Washington & Jefferson College
- Occupation: Diplomat, author, journalist, writer
- Employer: The New York Times Company
- Parent(s): Joseph Alden
- Awards: Knight of the Order of the Crown of Italy
- Position held: consul (Kingdom of Italy, 1885–1889)

William Livingston Alden (1837–1908) was an American journalist, fiction writer, humorist and canoe enthusiast. He was a US diplomat in Rome from 1885 to 1890 and thereafter lived in Europe until shortly before his death.

== Biography ==
William Livingston Alden was born in Williamstown, Massachusetts, on October 9, 1837. He attended Lafayette College and transferred to Jefferson College after his father, Joseph Alden, was elected president.

He graduated from Jefferson in 1858 and read law in New York City with William M. Evarts, joining the bar in 1860. He practiced law until 1866. He then became a journalist, writing for Scribner's Monthly, The Atlantic, New York World and Daily Graphic. He later worked on the editorial staff of The New York Times and produced a weekly column called "Minor Topics". He also wrote humor pieces and juvenile fiction. While in New York City he became an early member of the Theosophical Society, an esoteric organization founded by Helena Blavatsky in 1875.

Alden is also credited with bringing the sport of canoeing to the United States. He founded the New York Canoe Club in 1871, which was the first canoeing organization in America. He was a founding member of the American Canoe Association and served as its first Commodore.

Alden was appointed Consul General in Rome, Italy, by President Grover Cleveland in 1885, a position he held until 1889, and received from the king the cross of chevalier of the order of the Crown of Italy. In 1890 he lived in Paris, writing for the New York Herald until 1893, when he began living and writing in London. He died on January 14, 1908.

== Works ==
He is the author of many works, including the following:

- Domestic Explosives (1878)
- Shooting Stars (1879)
- A New Robinson Crusoe (1880)
- Canoe and Flying Proa (1880)
- The Moral Pirates (1881)
- Christopher Columbus (1440-1506): the first American citizen (1881)
- Life of Christopher Columbus (1882)
- The Cruise of the Ghost (1882)
- The Cruise of the Canoe Club (1883)
- The Adventures of Jimmy Brown (1885)
- The Loss of the Swansea (1889)
- Trying to Find Europe (1889)
- A Lost Love (1892)
- Told by the Colonel (1893)
- Freaks (1895)
- Van Wagener's Way (1898)
- The Mystery of Elias G. Roebuck
- His Daughter
