= Matthew Brown Riddle =

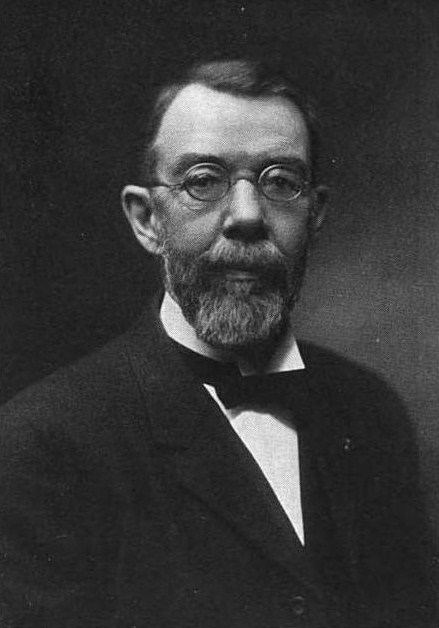
- Born: October 17, 1836; Pittsburgh, Pennsylvania
- Died: January 11, 1916 (aged 79)
- Parent: David Hunter Riddle

Matthew Brown Riddle (17 October 1836 Pittsburgh, Pennsylvania – 1 September 1916) was an American theologian.

== Biography ==
His father was the educator David Hunter Riddle. Matthew graduated from Jefferson College, Pennsylvania, in 1852, and from the New Brunswick Theological Seminary in 1859, after which he studied at Heidelberg. In 1861, he was chaplain of the 2d New Jersey regiment, and in 1862-69 he was pastor successively of Dutch Reformed Churches in Hoboken and Newark, New Jersey. He traveled in Europe from 1869 until 1871, and in the latter year was appointed professor of New Testament exegesis in the theological seminary of Hartford, Connecticut. In 1887, he accepted the same chair in Western Theological Seminary, Allegheny, Pennsylvania. Franklin and Marshall College, Pennsylvania, gave him the degree of D.D. in 1870.

He was an original member of the New Testament revision committee formed in 1871; translated and edited the epistles to the Romans, Galatians, Ephesians, and Colossians in the American edition of Lange's Commentary (New York, 1869; new ed., 1886); contributed to Rev. Dr. Philip Schaff's Popular Illustrated Commentary on the New Testament (4 vols., New York and Edinburgh, 1878–83), and to his International Revision Commentary (New York, 1882); edited the gospels of Mark and Luke for the American edition of H. A. W. Meyer's Commentary (New York, 1884); revised and edited Edward Robinson's Greek Harmony of the Gospels (Boston, 1885), and Robinson's English Harmony (1886); and edited parts of Bishop Arthur Cleveland Coxe's edition of the Ante-Nicene Fathers, contributing the “Teaching of the Twelve Apostles” and the “Second Clement” (Buffalo, 1886); Augustine's Harmony of the Gospels (New York, 1888); and Chrysostom's “Homilies on Matthew,” in Nicene Fathers (1888). With Rev. John E. Todd, D.D., he prepared the notes on the International Sunday School Lessons for the Congregational Publishing Society of Boston in 1877-81.

He retired in 1913.
