= John Work Scott =

President of Washington & Jefferson College (1807-1879)

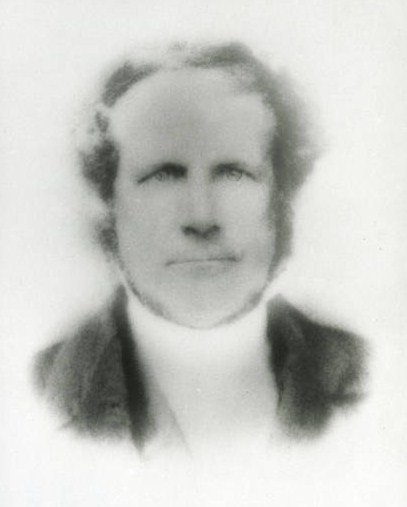

Sixth President of Washington College
- In office 1853–1865
- Preceded by: James Clark
- Succeeded by: Jonathan Edwards

Personal details
- Born: 1807
- Died: July 25, 1879
- Education: Jefferson College
- Profession: Educator and Ordained Minister
- Salary: $1,500 per year

John Work Scott (1807-1879) was an American academic. He was a son of Andrew Scott and Mary Dinsmore,l. He was the sixth and last president of Washington College before its merger with Jefferson College to form Washington & Jefferson College.

A native of Wheeling, West Virginia, Scott graduated from Jefferson College in 1827 and worked as a Presbyterian minister. He was elected president of Washington College on November 10, 1852 and was inaugurated in 1853. He earned a salary of $1000 per year and received a raise to $1500 per year in 1859. In 1860, he was elected president of the Maryland Agricultural College, but was unavailable to serve. By 1862, Washington College's enrollment dropped by about two-thirds, as 90 students joined the armed services to fight in the American Civil War. Scott retired from the presidency in August 1865, ostensibly to smooth the merger between Washington College and Jefferson College. He continued his career in academia by teaching at West Virginia University, where he also served as acting president 1876-1877.[4]

== See also ==
- Washington & Jefferson College
- President of Washington & Jefferson College

Academic offices
Preceded by James I. Brownson (Interim)	President of Washington College; 1852–Union of the Colleges	Succeeded by Jonathan Edwards
Preceded by Charles Benedict Calvert	President of the Maryland Agricultural College; 1860	Succeeded by John M. Colby
