= McMillan Hall =

- Administration Building, Washington and Jefferson College
- U.S. National Register of Historic Places
- Washington County History & Landmarks Foundation Landmark
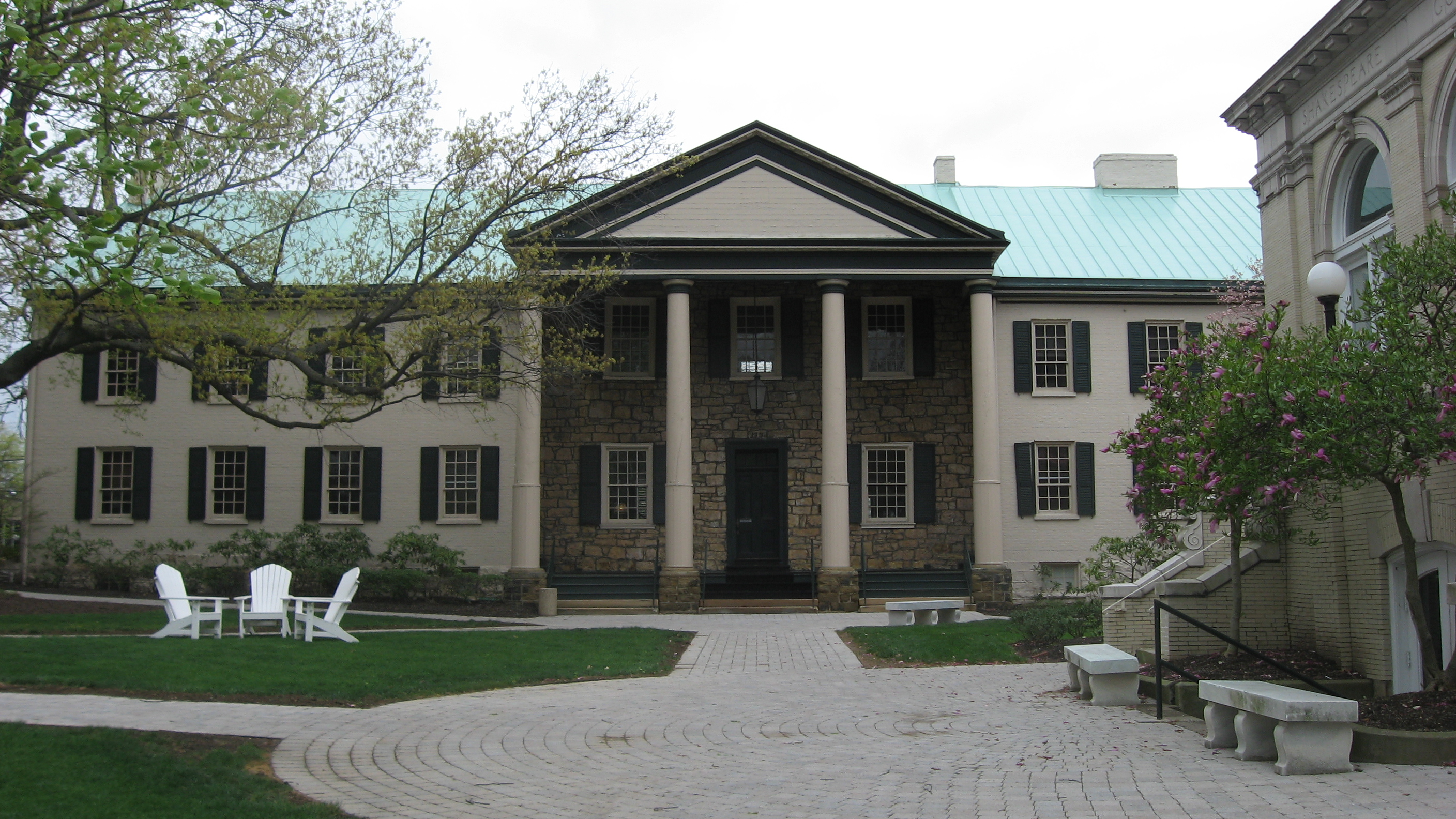

- Location within Pennsylvania Location within the United States
- Interactive map showing McMillan Hall
- Location: Washington, Pennsylvania
- Coordinates: 40°10′13.2″N 80°14′27.9″W
- Built: 1793 (central part); 1818 (wings)
- Architectural style: Jeffersonian Vernacular architecture
- NRHP reference No.: 77001199
- Added to NRHP: August 16, 1977

McMillan Hall is a building on the campus of Washington & Jefferson College in Washington, Pennsylvania, United States. Built in 1793, it is the only surviving building from Washington Academy. It is the eighth-oldest academic building in the United States that is still in use for its original academic purpose and is the oldest surviving college building west of the Allegheny Mountains.

The building is situated on the corner of South Lincoln Street and East Wheeling Street in Washington, Pennsylvania. It is 120 feet (37 m) by 40 feet (12 m) in size. McMillan Hall is named after College founder and Presbyterian missionary John McMillan. Throughout its history, McMillan has also been known as the "Old College," the "Academy Building," and the "Administration Building." It is currently home to administrative offices, including the Office of Communications and the Office of the President. The College's ceremonial mace is carved from the original wooden pillars.

In 1977, it was listed on the National Register of Historic Places. The National Register described the building's architecture as achieving a "unique quality and charm from the fact that vernacular builders selectively borrowed Georgian, Roman Classical, Adamesque, and other European Renaissance architectural forms, elements, and details and combined them in the builder's own esoteric way." The National Register described its historical importance as a "unique variation of a Western Pennsylvania stone building," calling it "irreplaceable on a regional or national level."

In 1793, the Trustees of Washington Academy authorized the construction of a new building. Alexander Hamilton and Henry Lee stayed in the hall during their visit during the Whiskey Rebellion. The 2-story stone building was ready for occupation in 1797. Two wings and a portico were added in 1818, allowing the building to house dormitories and dining facilities for students. In 1900, the building was saved from planned demolition by a benefactor who insisted that it be preserved. In order to make room for the proposed library, it was moved 40 feet (12 m) towards Lincoln Street. The building was remodeled in 1912 to house administrative offices. In 1928, the north wing, which had been used as student housing, was remodeled to create office space. At various times, the basement housed a dining hall, a lunch counter, classrooms, and the bookstore. It was restored to its 18th-century appearance in the late 1980s.

It is designated as a historic public landmark by the Washington County History & Landmarks Foundation.

== History ==
=== Initial construction ===
In 1791, a fire destroyed the original log Washington County Courthouse, leaving Washington Academy without anywhere to hold classes. In 1793, the Trustees of Washington Academy authorized three men, James Brice, Absolom Baird and David Bradford, to form a committee to build and superintend a new building built on property donated by William Hoge. The foundation and walls of that building were finished in the fall of that year. On March 4, 1794, the Trustees entered into a contract with William Sherrard to complete the stone building, which was 35 by 30 feet (10.7 by 9.1 m) in size and stood two stories. It is believed that the building had an external staircase, but this is unclear. The building was placed into use for the first time on April 10, 1797. In addition to having a library and a reading room for students, the main hall was used as a Presbyterian place of worship.

=== Expansion ===
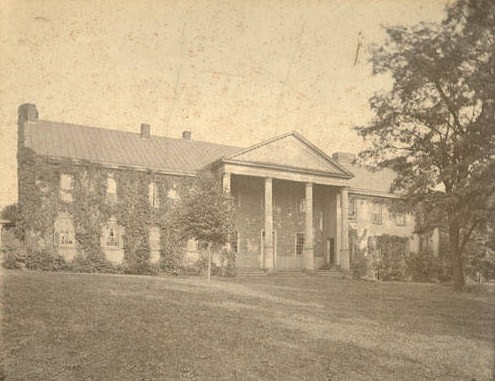
The "Old College" in 1899, still in its original location.

On March 28, 1806, Washington Academy was chartered as Washington College. A decade later, on June 24, 1816, the College's Committee of Buildings began planning to expand the building by adding two wings and a two-story portico with four Tuscan columns. Following the completion of the wings in 1819, the College was carrying $3,004.18 in construction debt owed to the workmen. In 1835, constructing began on a new building, called the "New College." Up until then, the original building, which was now referred to as the "Old College," had been the only building on the campus of Washington College. These additions were used as dormitories and dining facilities for the students, while the second floor was sealed off from use. In May 1826, the interior of the original center portion of the building was renovated. During his tenure, President David McConaughy lived rent-free in the south wing. Plans to enlarge the dormitories facilities, including the possibility of using the entire building as a boarding house, were discussed in 1848 and 1849.

=== Movement and re-dedication ===
In the late 1890s, the Board of Trustees was considering demolishing the "Academy Building," which then housed the library. However, the building was saved in 1900 when College benefactor William Reed Thompson donated $50,000 for the construction of a new library with the stipulation that the Academy Building be preserved. In order to make way for the new library, the Academy Building was moved 40 feet (12 m) to the east and towards Lincoln Street by the John Eichley Corporation of Pittsburgh. After the move, the new foundation was of incorrect proportions, requiring the contractor to keep the building mounted on "skids and jacks" while a new foundation was constructed. The error cost the contractor dearly, and the whole operation cost the College $7,455.69.

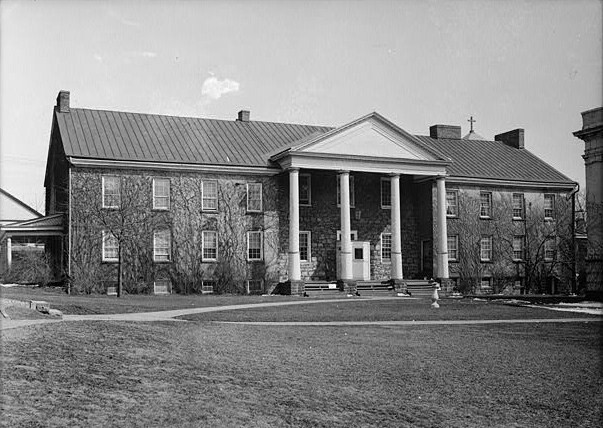
Photograph from the Historic American Buildings Survey in 1934

The building was remodeled in 1912, opening the second floor for use for the first time since 1835 and adding an interior stairway. The funds for this remodeling project were donated by President James D. Moffat. The interior was painted while and the first floor received new fixtures, including new railings, partitions, and windows. It was rechristened the "Administrative Building," because it then housed all of the administrative offices, including the President's office. The "Administration Committee" met on the second floor. A cement walkway was added to connect the building to Old Main. Other proposals asked that the center portion of the building be used as "the long wanted student smoking room on the campus."

In 1928, the north wing was converted from a residence hall into office space, while the south wing continued to be used as a faculty residence. In 1937, the building was repainted and refurbished with new floor coverings. The College bookstore opened in the basement in 1938 and was enlarged in 1939 to add a refreshment and lunch counter. In 1942, a room under the South wing was turned into a classroom and a faculty dining room was added.

With the increased enrollment after World War II, the building's dining hall was moved to the Chapel in Old Main and the bookstore was moved to Hays Hall, allowing the former bookstore location to become part of the faculty dining hall. The south wing faculty residence hall was converted into office space in 1947, with administration office on the first floor and faculty offices on the second floor. By 1949, the entire building was used for administrative offices. By 1952, the postwar enrollment figures had stabilized, allowing the bookstore to reopen in the basement and the dining hall to return to Hayes Hall.

=== Restoration ===
A major renovation project, lasting from 1985 to 1987, restored the building to its original 18th-century condition. Non-original walls and partitions were removed, opening the hallways in the two wings for free movement, and the main lobby and first floor foyer were restored. For the exterior, the roof, soffit, and fasciae were repaired and the brickwork was repainted in a Colonial ivory. The three porches, on the front and one on each wing, and the chestnut pillars were restored and reconstructed. The basement was converted into offices for the clerical staff and the mailroom. The electrical wiring, ventilation system, telephone, and switchboard system were replaced. Overall, this restoration cost $800,000 and was funded by private sources generated through the College's "Century III Fund" capital campaign. The newly restored building housed the President's Office and other administrative offices, including Development, Public Information, and Admissions Offices. It also served as a welcome center for prospective students and campus visitors. On Founders Day 1993, the building was rededicated as John McMillan Hall.
