= George P. Hays (college president) =

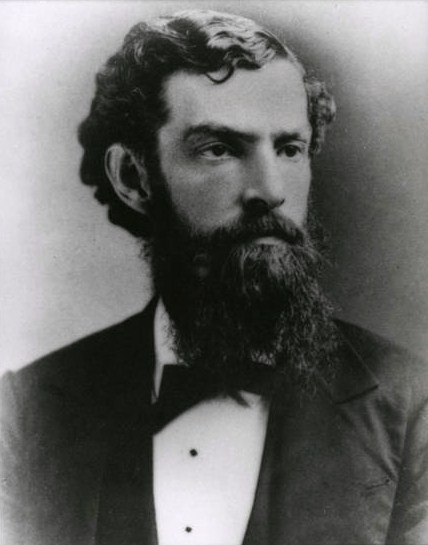

2nd President of Washington & Jefferson College
- In office August 3, 1870 – June 20, 1881
- Preceded by: Samuel J. Wilson (acting); James I. Brownson (acting); Jonathan Edwards
- Succeeded by: James D. Moffat

Personal details
- Born: February 2, 1838 Miller's Run, Pennsylvania
- Died: 1897 (aged 58–59)
- Education: Jefferson College; Western Theological Seminary (now Pittsburgh Theological Seminary); Lafayette College; Hanover College

George Price Hays was the 2nd president of Washington & Jefferson College.

Hays was born in Miller's Run, Pennsylvania on February 2, 1838. He studied at Jefferson College, graduating in 1857, and at the Western Theological Seminary (now Pittsburgh Theological Seminary). He was licensed to preach in 1859. Hays continued his education and earned Doctor of Divinity degree from Lafayette College in 1870 and a LL.D. from Hanover College.

He was elected second president of Washington & Jefferson College on August 3, 1870. The inauguration was held on September 21, 1870, in the Town Hall at Washington, Pennsylvania. In 1875, the college began the expanding "Old Main" by adding a third floor and two towers, at a cost of $65,000. By 1877, the costs reached a total of $73,196.51. By 1878, the board of trustees was forced to reduce the salaries of the professors and the president. Hays submitted his resignation on December 18, 1878, but the Board of Trustees declined to accept it. On March 26, 1879, President Hays took a leave of absence without pay. On June 20, 1881, the Board of Trustees accepted Hays' resignation and he returned to the ministry full-time, preaching in Denver, Cincinnati, and Kansas City.

== Bibliography ==
- Hays, George Price (1876). History of the Second Presbyterian Church, Washington, Penn'a. Swan & Ecker. p. 22.

Academic offices
Preceded by James I. Brownson (Interim)	President of Washington and Jefferson College; 1870–1881	Succeeded by James D. Moffat
Religious titles
Preceded by The Rev. Edwin Francis Hatfield	Moderator of the 96th General Assembly of the Presbyterian Church in the United States of America; 1884–1885	Succeeded by The Rev. Elijah R. Craven
