= William McMillan (college president) =

American academic administrator

- Born: 1777; Lewistown, Pennsylvania
- Died: April 11, 1832 (aged 55); New Athens, Ohio
- Education: Jefferson College
- Church: Presbyterian
- Ordained: June 26, 1806
- Offices held: 4th president of Jefferson College (1817-1822); President of Franklin College

William McMillan was elected the fourth president of Jefferson College on September 24, 1817.

McMillan was educated at Jefferson College, the institution founded by his uncle, the Rev. John McMillan, graduating with the Jefferson class of 1802, the first class to graduate from the newly chartered college. He was one of the founders of the Philo Literary Society at Jefferson College.

He was licensed to preach by the Presbytery of Ohio on June 27, 1804, and was ordained June 26, 1806.

McMillan resigned the presidency of Jefferson on August 14, 1822, after the Board of Trustees dropped charges the faculty had brought against several students for slandering his teaching and administrative abilities. He went on to be president of Franklin College, in Ohio. He died in New Athens, Ohio on April 11, 1832.

== See also ==
- Washington & Jefferson College
- President of Washington & Jefferson College

Academic offices
Preceded by Andrew Wylie	President of Jefferson College; 1817–1822	Succeeded by Matthew Brown
Preceded by position created	President of Franklin College; 1825–1832	Succeeded by Joseph Smith
