= James D. Moffat =

James David Moffat
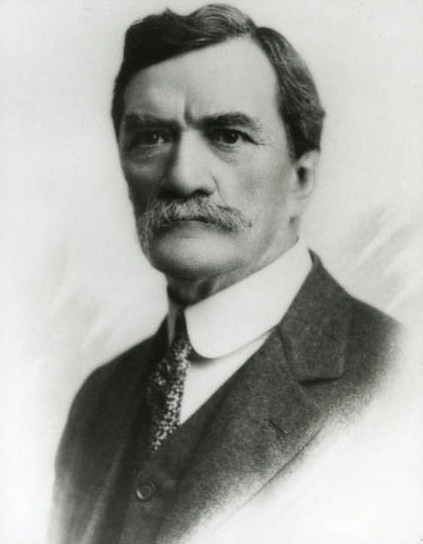

3rd President of Washington & Jefferson College
- In office November 16, 1881 – January 1, 1915
- Preceded by: George P. Hays
- Succeeded by: Frederick W. Hinitt

Personal details
- Born: March 15, 1846 New Lisbon, Ohio
- Died: November 4, 1916 (aged 70) Washington, Pennsylvania
- Education: Washington & Jefferson College; Western University of Pennsylvania; University of Pennsylvania; Missouri Valley College
- Salary: $7,100 per year

James David Moffat was the 3rd president of Washington & Jefferson College.

Moffat, a native of New Lisbon, Ohio, was born on March 15, 1846. He spent his youth in St. Clairsville, Ohio, and Bellaire, Ohio, before working as a teacher and a bookkeeper. He entered Jefferson College in 1865 and graduated from Washington & Jefferson College in 1869. He studied at Princeton Theological Seminary from 1869 to 1871. Following ordination in 1873, he served as pastor in Wheeling, West Virginia. He received three Doctor of Laws degrees, one from the Western University of Pennsylvania in 1897, another from University of Pennsylvania in 1901, and another from the Missouri Valley College in 1906. Moffat received two honorary Doctor of Divinity degrees, one from Hanover College in 1882 and one from the College of New Jersey in 1883.

He was elected the third president of Washington & Jefferson College on November 16, 1881. During his tenure, the college experienced a period of growth, including a threefold increase in the number of professors and new campus buildings.

In 1884, the college purchased the land known as the "old fair ground," now used for Cameron Stadium, for the sum of $7,025. The student body agreed to contribute one dollar each term to finance the purchase. The college built a new gymnasium (now the Old Gym) in 1893; Hays Hall was completed in 1903; Thompson Memorial Library opened in 1905; and Thistle Physics Building was completed in 1912. In 1893, the campus installed an electric lighting system. In 1892, the Board of Trustees granted a request from the senior class that they be graduated in cap and gown, establishing that tradition at W&J for all future commencements.

Moffat personally paid for the 1912 renovations of McMillan Hall. He resigned on January 1, 1915, after 33 years of service, citing his age of 68 years and the responsibilities of his office as factors in his retirement. At that time, he was one of the oldest college presidents in continuous service in the country, and his salary of $7,100 made him one of the highest paid presidents in the country. He died in his home in Washington, Pennsylvania, on November 4, 1916, after a short illness.

Academic offices
Preceded by George P. Hays	President of Washington and Jefferson College; 1881–1915	Succeeded by Frederick W. Hinitt
Religious titles
Preceded by The Rev. J. Addison Henry	Moderator of the 117th General Assembly of the Presbyterian Church in the United States of America; 1905–1906	Succeeded by The Rev. Hunter Corbett
