= David Hunter Riddle =

American academic (1805–1888)

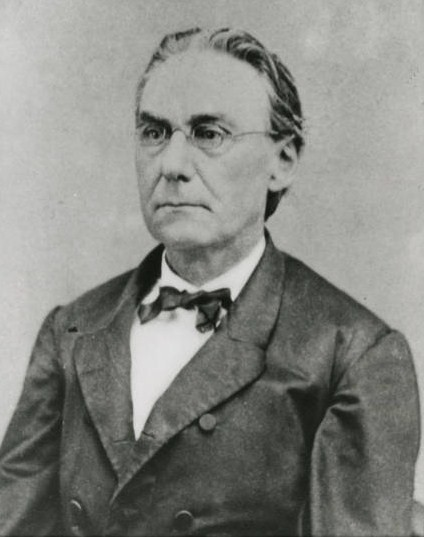
- David Hunter Riddle

Acting Principal of the Western University of Pennsylvania
- In office 1849–1855
- Preceded by: Heman Dyer
- Succeeded by: John F. McLaren

Ninth President of Jefferson College
- In office 1862–1865
- Preceded by: Joseph Alden
- Succeeded by: Jonathan Edwards

Personal details
- Born: April 14, 1805 Martinsburg, Virginia
- Died: July 16, 1888 (aged 83) Martinsburg, West Virginia
- Children: Matthew Brown Riddle
- Education: Princeton Theological Seminary
- Profession: Pastor, professor, education administrator

David Hunter Riddle (April 14, 1805 – 1888) was the ninth and last president of Jefferson College from 1862 until its union with Washington College to form Washington & Jefferson College in 1865. He also served as trustee and the acting Principal of the Western University of Pennsylvania, today known as the University of Pittsburgh, from 1849 to 1855.

== Early years ==
Riddle was born in Martinsburg, Virginia, on April 14, 1805 and graduated from Jefferson College in 1823, at the age of 18. He then went on to the Princeton Theological Seminary where he graduated and was ordained in 1828. For the next twenty nine years he served as pastor of the Presbyterian Church in Winchester, Virginia, from 1828 to 1833, and then in Pittsburgh from 1833 to 1857 where he served as pastor of the Third Presbyterian Church.

== Western University of Pennsylvania ==
Riddle served at the Western University of Pennsylvania (WUP), since renamed the University of Pittsburgh, during one of the most tumultuous times in the institution's history. The pastor of Pittsburgh's Third Presbyterian Church, he was also a member of the university's board of trustees. In 1845, the "Great Fire" destroyed not only the university, but a much of the downtown Pittsburgh business district. Riddle's leadership following the disaster was instrumental in the university remaining in the city of Pittsburgh and continuing to hold classes in temporary rooms until a new building could be erected. Within a year, in the summer of 1846, a new building for the university was opened on Duquesne Way, and the university carried on with the business of reassembling collections for its library and equipping its laboratories and classrooms. However, soon after, in July, 1849, another fire again destroyed the university's facilities.

The construction of the 1854 main building of the Western University of Pennsylvania's occurred during Riddle's tenure

These sequential catastrophes led the university to suspend operations in order to regroup. Riddle, who had by then become president of the university's board of trustees, was chosen to act as Principal, a title, originating from the school's days as the Pittsburgh Academy, that was still given to the head of the university until it was changed in 1872 to Chancellor. Riddle's years serving as acting Principal principally involved overseeing the rebuilding of the university which included investing the university's remaining financial assets, reassembling collections of equipment and resources, and securing a site for the erection of a new building. That structure, completed in 1854, was a 16-room, slate roof and brick building, designed to be as nearly fireproof as possible. It was located on the corner of Ross and Diamond (now Forbes Avenue) streets, on the site of the present day City-County building. The university, under Riddle's guidance, resumed classes on October 8, 1855, and chose his successor, John F. McLaren, who was formally inaugurated as the fourth permanent head of the university on December 19, 1856. The building whose construction was overseen by Riddle housed the university until 1882, when it was sold to Allegheny County to replace its courthouse that was destroyed in a fire that year.

Riddle's family ties to the Western University of Pennsylvania remained strong as his son, Matthew Brown Riddle, was a student at the university when it burned in 1849, and his grandson, Walther Riddle, graduated from the university in 1892. While a student, his grandson played fullback for the university's varsity football team, later served on the Alumni Athletic Committee, and was elected to the university's board of trustees in 1908. During the 1911-12 school year, Matthew and Walther Riddle donated a portrait of David Riddle to the university.

== Jefferson College ==
Riddle was elected president of Jefferson College from 1862 until the union of the two colleges into Washington & Jefferson College in 1865. Following the union he continued on as Adjunct Professor of Greek at the Jefferson campus until 1868. From there he returned to his birthplace where he served as pastor of the Presbyterian Church for 11 years, until 1879. In 1888, Riddle died at the age of eighty three.

Academic offices
Preceded by Joseph Alden	President of Jefferson College; 1862–Union of the Colleges	Succeeded by Jonathan Edwards
