= Joseph Alden =

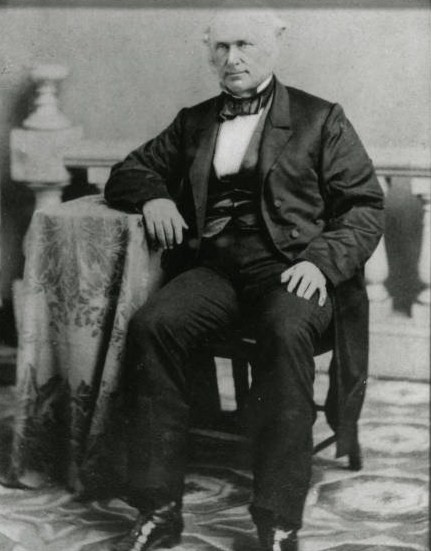
- Born: January 4, 1807; Cairo, New York, U.S.
- Died: August 30, 1885 (aged 78); New York City, U.S.
- Resting place: Green-Wood Cemetery, New York, U.S.
- Education: Brown University; Princeton Theological Seminary; Union College (A.B., D.D.); Columbia University (LL.D.)
- Employers: 8th president of Jefferson College (1857–1862); 1st president of State Normal School at Albany (1867–1882)
- Spouse: Isabel G. Livingston (1816–1872)
- Children: William Livingston Alden (1837–1908)
- Parent(s): Eliab Alden (1760–1844, father); Mary Hathaway Alden (1766–1859, mother)

Ecclesiastical career
- Church: Presbyterian
- Congregations served: Congregational Church of Williamstown, Massachusetts

Joseph Alden (January 4, 1807 – August 30, 1885) was an American academic and Presbyterian pastor.

== Education ==
Alden was born in Cairo, New York, on January 4, 1807, and he began there to teach school when fourteen years of age, in order to pay his way through college. He was thus enabled to attend Brown University, from 1826 to 1827, and received his bachelor's degree from Union College in 1829, going on to studied theology at Princeton Theological Seminary until 1831.

He received the degree of D.D. from Union College in 1839, and that of LL.D. from Columbia University in 1857.

== Career ==
He was tutor at the College of New Jersey, from 1831 to 1833, when was ordained to the ministry of the Congregational Church, July 3, 1834, and became a pastor at Williamstown, Massachusetts, from 1834 to 1836. He was also a teacher in the Dedham Public Schools. In 1834 he married Isabel G. Livingston, daughter of the Rev. Dr. Gilbert R. Livingston, of Philadelphia, and three years later, he became father of a son, William Livingston Alden.

Dr. Alden was professor of rhetoric, political economy, and history at Williams College from 1835 to 1852, professor of mental and moral philosophy in Lafayette College, from 1852 to 1857, when he became president of Jefferson College, from 1857 to 1862. He was stated supply, Boiling Spring, New Jersey, from 1863 to 1865, editor N.Y. Observer in 1866, and principal of the State Normal School at Albany, New York (now University at Albany, SUNY), from 1867 to 1882.

Dr. Alden has long been prominently before the public as a leading educator and writer on educational topics. His services, both literary and administrative, entitle him to the high rank which he holds as the head of one of the oldest and strongest of the state institutions for the education and training of teachers. He died in New York City, on August 30, 1885. He is interred with his wife at Green-Wood Cemetery in Brooklyn, New York.

== Works ==
Dr Alden besides his large work as an educator has been diligent in the use of his pen writing almost constantly for the periodical press and sending out at intervals instructive volumes for the benefit of his generation, were his earlier works were mostly for the young. Besides over seventy Sunday School library books, the most well known were Christian Ethics or The Science of Duty (1866), The Science of Government (1867), and Thoughts on the Religious Life (1879, with an introduction by William Cullen Bryant).

=== Selected works ===
- Alden, Joseph (1835). The Life of the Prophet Jeremiah. Massachusetts: The Massachusetts Sunday School Society. pp. 47.
- Alden, Joseph (1879). Thoughts on the Religious Life. New York: G.P. Putnam's Sons. pp. 133.
- Alden, Joseph (1872). Alden's Citizen's Manual: A Text-book on Government, for Common Schools. New York: Sheldon & Co. pp. 141.
- Alden, Joseph (1866). Christian Ethics; Or, The Science of Duty. New York: Ivison, Phinnet, Blakeman Co. pp. 173.
- Alden, Joseph (1886). The Science of Government in Connection with American Institutions. New York & Chicago: Sheldon & Company. pp. 304.

Academic offices
Preceded by Alexander Blaine Brown	President of Jefferson College; 1857–1862	Succeeded by David Hunter Riddle
