= Frederick W. Hinitt =

American pastor and academic administrator

The Reverend Frederick W. Hinitt
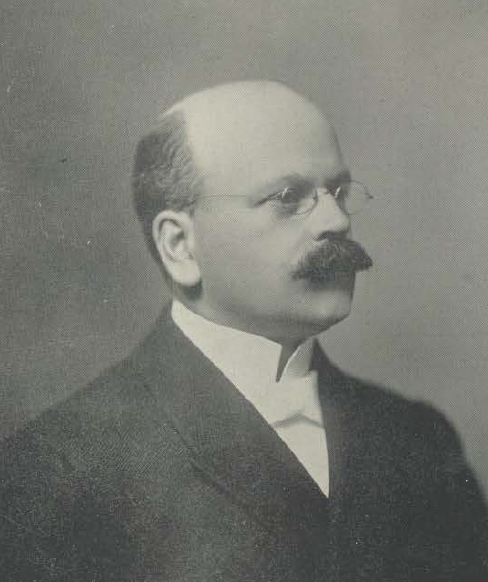
- Hinitt at Central University c. 1905

4th President of Washington & Jefferson College
- In office January 5, 1915 – June 1, 1918
- Preceded by: James D. Moffat
- Succeeded by: Samuel Charles Black

10th President of the Central University of Kentucky
- In office July 1, 1904 – January 1, 1915
- Preceded by: William C. Roberts
- Succeeded by: William Arthur Ganfield

6th President of Parsons College
- In office July 27, 1900 – April 1904
- Preceded by: Daniel E. Jenkins
- Succeeded by: Willis E. Parsons

Personal details
- Born: November 21, 1866 Kidderminster, England
- Died: October 25, 1928 (aged 61) Indiana, Pennsylvania, U.S.
- Spouse: Effie Humphreys (m. 1892; died 1918)
- Education: Westminster College; McCormick Theological Seminary; University of Wooster
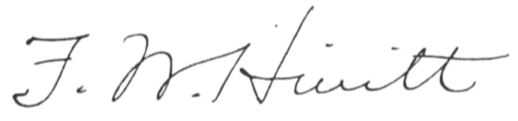
- Signature

Frederick William Hinitt (November 21, 1866 – October 25, 1928) was an American Presbyterian pastor and academic administrator who was president of Parsons College, Central University of Kentucky (now Centre College), and Washington & Jefferson College for various periods between 1900 and 1918. He was educated at Westminster College, McCormick Theological Seminary, and the University of Wooster (now the College of Wooster), and he began his career in the ministry at Presbyterian churches in Warrensburg, Missouri, and Ottumwa, Iowa. Already a member of the board of trustees of Parsons College, in Fairfield, Iowa, he was elected president of that school in July 1900. In spite of a fire that destroyed one of the school's few buildings, a new women's dormitory was constructed and funds were raised to build a Carnegie library.

He left Parsons in 1904 to take the presidency of Central University, where he worked to improve admissions and academic standards and began the process of overhauling the curriculum. As part of the process of improving campus, a new science building was constructed and Central got a Carnegie library of their own, completed in 1913. Amidst declining enrollment, Hinitt resigned in 1915 to take the presidency of Washington & Jefferson. His three-year presidency there was dominated by the effects of World War I, and he left in 1918 to become pastor of the First Presbyterian Church in Indiana, Pennsylvania. After completing a one-year leave of absence working in war camps in England, he returned to Indiana and continued preaching until his death in 1928.

== Life and career ==
=== Early life and Parsons president, 1866–1904 ===
Frederick William Hinitt was born in Kidderminster, England, on November 21, 1866. (Note: Reporting by the Courier Journal incorrectly gives his birthdate as November 2.) He moved with his family to Missouri when he was fourteen years of age and shortly thereafter began studying architecture. He studied for the ministry at Westminster College in Fulton, Missouri, and graduated with a Bachelor of Science degree in 1889. He earned another bachelor's degree from Westminster the following year and a Master of Arts degree in 1893. While at Westminster, he was a member of the Phi Delta Theta fraternity. In May 1892, he earned a degree from McCormick Theological Seminary. That year, Hinitt married Effie Humphreys, (Note: Hinitt's wife's name is occasionally given as "Elsie".) and the pair remained married until Effie's death on December 23, 1918. Finally, he received a Doctor of Divinity degree and a Ph.D. from the University of Wooster, now known as the College of Wooster. (Note: Sources disagree as to when and from where Hinitt received the D.D. and Ph.D. degrees. A 1904 article from the Courier Journal reports that he received the D.D. from Westminster College in 1893 and the Ph.D. from Wooster in 1896, while the Central University yearbook from the following year says that both degrees were earned from Wooster in 1902. Contemporary sources published by Centre agree that both degrees were earned from Wooster but differ in that the Ph.D. is listed as having been earned in 1896, with the D.D. following in 1902. Further, the 1905 Central University yearbook says that he received the Ph.D. from Wooster and two D.D. degrees, from two unnamed schools, all in 1896, and the 1908 yearbook says the two D.D. degrees were received from Wooster in 1901 and Westminster in 1903.)

Following his graduation from McCormick, Hinitt became pastor of the Presbyterian Church in Warrensburg, Missouri. In 1895, he relocated to become pastor of the First Presbyterian Church in Ottumwa, Iowa, and joined the board of trustees of Parsons College in 1896. He was elected president of Parsons by the board on July 27, 1900; he succeeded Daniel E. Jenkins, who left to take a faculty position at the Omaha Presbyterian Theological Seminary. His inauguration was scheduled for June 1901 but ultimately delayed until October 15, 1901. The construction of a women's dormitory had been an issue at Parsons since at least 1883, when the board had determined that such a building was needed. The cornerstone was laid under Hinitt's administration on April 8, 1901, and the completed building, named Ballard Hall, opened as a women's dormitory and student union at the beginning of the 1901–1902 academic year. The project was completed at a total cost of over $17,500 (equivalent to $677,000 in 2025).

On the morning of August 19, 1902, (Note: Parsons (1925) errantly says the fire began "in the night of August 19, 1902", rather than early that morning.) a fire began on the second floor of a campus building and destroyed everything except its exterior walls. It burned for four hours and threatened Hinitt's house, located nearby, though ultimately the house sustained damage only to its chimney, which collapsed into the cellar. The damage to the school totaled $55,000 (equivalent to $2,047,000 in 2025), of which the school's insurance covered approximately half. Hinitt was vacationing at the time, and the school did not reopen until after his return. While the fundraising and rebuilding efforts were ongoing, Hinitt traveled to meet with Andrew Carnegie in New York to ask for $15,000 (equivalent to $558,000 in 2025) to aid in the construction of a library; Carnegie agreed, provided the college matched that sum on their own. While Parsons was not initially able to satisfy this condition, Carnegie later agreed to the donation in 1905, and the library was dedicated on June 5, 1907.

=== Central University of Kentucky, 1904–1915 ===
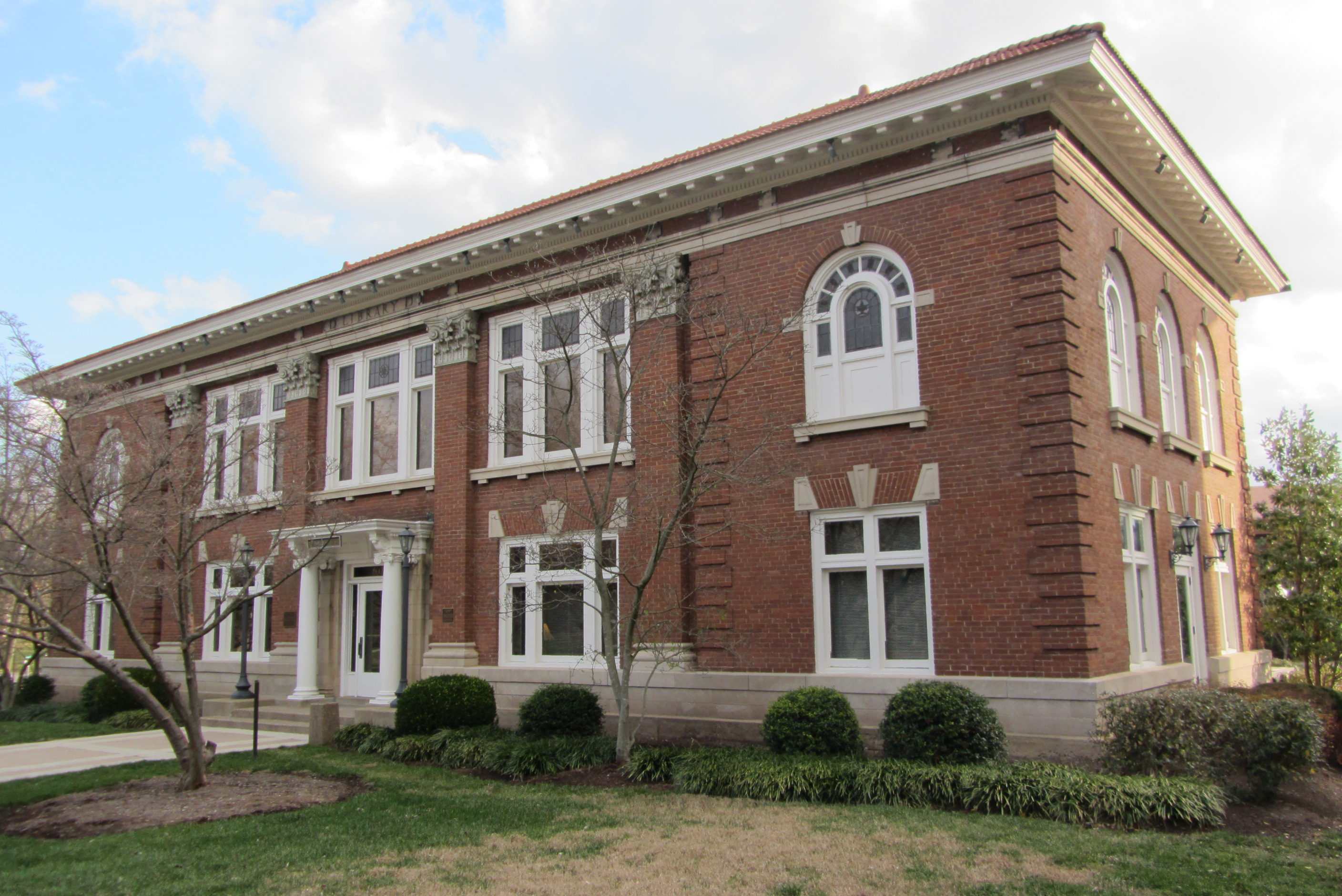
Old Carnegie Library (pictured in 2012) was completed in 1913 during Hinitt's presidency at Central.

Hinitt was offered the presidency of Central University of Kentucky, in Danville, Kentucky, on April 7, 1904. (Note: Previously known as Centre College, the school consolidated with Central University, located in Richmond, Kentucky, to become Central University of Kentucky at the beginning of the 1901–1902 academic year during the presidency of Hinitt's predecessor, William C. Roberts. The school later resumed use of the Centre College name in December 1918 and maintains its use to the present day.) He arrived in Danville on April 14, where he greeted by a crowd and officially accepted the position on April 18. Upon his arrival, it was seen as relatively certain that he would accept the job, though this was temporarily cast into doubt as the result of a prank by Central students which involved letting loose a hog in the chapel prior to Hinitt's address. He chose to accept Central's offer over similar competing offers from Lane Theological Seminary and his alma mater of Westminster College. Hinitt gave the commencement address at the Louisville Presbyterian Theological Seminary on May 6, 1904, and while he was not able to be present for Central's 1904 commencement exercises, he did travel to Danville to give the sermon at the school's baccalaureate service on June 5. Hinitt's salary as president began July 1, 1904, and he moved to Danville before the start of the 1904–1905 academic year. His formal inauguration was held on October 20, 1904. He was the school's first president to hold a Ph.D.

Major priorities of Hinitt's at Central were a reorganization of the curriculum and a strengthening of the school's academic standards. The school joined the Association of Colleges and Secondary Schools of Southern States in his first year, and Hinitt's administration pushed to increase the requirements for admissions as well. He also worked to increase the quantity and quality of public secondary schools in Kentucky, ultimately resulting in the opening of Danville's first public high school in 1912. The curriculum at the time was in a transitional period between the classics-oriented focus of the college's early years and the modern-day major/minor system, with four tracks for students to choose from. According to Centre College historian William Weston, these tracks were the "classical course", the "Latin-Scientific" course, the "chemical-biological" course", and the "mathematical-physical" course. The classical curriculum was eventually completely phased out in 1915 and Central began to offer the Bachelor of Arts and Bachelor of Science degrees. This change was finalized in 1916, the year after Hinitt departed Danville, when students were permitted to declare majors and minors for the first time.

In 1905, Hinitt received another financial offer from Andrew Carnegie, though this time in the amount of $30,000 (equivalent to $1,075,000 in 2025), in order to construct a new library building on Central's campus. As with the offer at Parsons, this was contingent on Central matching the amount of the gift through fundraising of their own. The board of trustees accepted this deal unanimously at their March 31, 1905, meeting. This was one of the several improvements to the campus during Hinitt's tenure, which also included in 1909 the construction of Young Hall, the school's first science-specific building. A new gymnasium was constructed in the place of the old library and the new Carnegie library was constructed in 1913 in the place of the old gymnasium. These improvements were in spite of a March 2, 1908, fire that caused approximately $10,000 worth of damage (equivalent to $358,000 in 2025, all covered by insurance) to Breckinridge Hall, a dormitory building constructed in 1892.

Hinitt's correspondence with Carnegie was not limited to the library, as the president also wished for Central to join the Carnegie Foundation for the Advancement of Teaching. This required Centre to be independent of the Presbyterian Church, and at the time they were not independent to the satisfaction of the Carnegie Foundation. By 1908, Centre had gained membership to the Foundation and by 1910, all references to Central as a Christian school had been omitted from the college catalogue. This change to the school's church relationship was controversial, and it was ultimately reversed nearly a decade later. Enrollment began to experience a decline around the time Central severed ties with the church and reached a low point of 80 in 1915. Hinitt resigned effective January 1, 1915. He was succeeded by John W. Redd, dean of the college, in an interim capacity before William Arthur Ganfield was hired as Central's eleventh president later that year.

=== Washington & Jefferson and later career, 1915–1928 ===
To the Class of 1918, divided on this day, with so many of your men absent in service, I have but this word to say: fear God and serve your country!

— Frederick W. Hinitt, 1918 Washington & Jefferson commencement address

While still in office at Central, Hinitt had been unanimously elected president of Washington & Jefferson College by their board of trustees on September 23, 1914. He accepted the offer on September 30. He was received for an introduction on November 6 and addressed the W&J student body on November 20. He took office when the college reopened after its winter break on January 5, 1915, (Note: Washington & Jefferson's library special collections page about Hinitt says that he "assumed the duties of the presidency on January 4, 1915", though contemporary newspaper reporting shows that he was slated to, and did, assume office when the college opened after the Christmas holiday, which took place on January 5.) and he was officially inaugurated on June 15 of that year. His tenure as president of W&J was dominated by the United States' entry into World War I. Total college enrollment dropped to 180, a decrease of 50 percent. The 1918 commencement exercises were held early to accommodate men who were deployed to Europe, but only 24 students were able to attend.

Hinitt resigned the presidency of W&J in May 1918, effective June 1, 1918. He was made pastor of the First Presbyterian Church in Indiana, Pennsylvania, on May 28, 1918, but shortly afterward took a one-year leave of absence to work with the YMCA in army camps in England and to serve as an army field secretary in the American Expeditionary Force. He had returned to the United States by June 4, 1919, when he presented diplomas at the Indiana High School graduation ceremony. He gave the commencement address for Indiana Normal School's exercises several weeks later on June 25. Hinitt died around 2:00 p.m. on October 25, 1928, in Indiana, Pennsylvania. (Note: Several modern sources incorrectly give Hinitt's date of death as October 25, 1927.)

== Notes ==
Academic offices
Preceded by Daniel E. Jenkins	President of Parsons College; 1900 — 1904	Succeeded by Willis E. Parsons
Preceded by William C. Roberts	President of Central University of Kentucky; 1904 — 1915	Succeeded by John W. Redd (interim); William Arthur Ganfield
Preceded by James D. Moffat	President of Washington & Jefferson College; 1915 — 1918	Succeeded by William E. Slemmons (interim); Samuel Charles Black
