= Samuel J. Wilson =

American clergyman and academic (1828–1883)

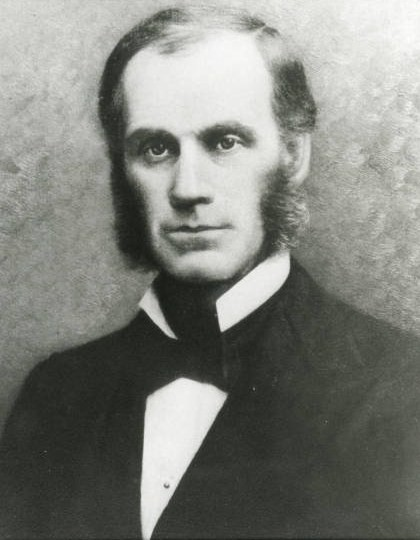
- Born: Samuel Jennings Wilson; July 19, 1828; Washington County, Pennsylvania
- Died: August 17, 1883 (aged 55); Sewickley, Pennsylvania
- Education: Washington College; Western Theological Seminary
- Church: Presbyterian
- Offices held: President pro temp. of Washington & Jefferson College

Samuel Jennings Wilson (July 19, 1828 – August 17, 1883) was a clergyman and academic in Western Pennsylvania.

== Life and career ==
Wilson was born in Washington County, Pennsylvania, on July 19, 1828, and attended Washington College and was a student and teacher at the Western Theological Seminary (now Pittsburgh Theological Seminary) in Allegheny City, Pennsylvania, for over 25 years, serving as chair of sacred and ecclesiastical history. He served as a delegate to various national and world-wide conferences of the Presbyterian Church. He served President Pro Tem. for Washington & Jefferson College from April 20, 1869, to August 4, 1869. After his death from typhoid in 1883, he was called "one of the abelest and most learned ministers in the Presbyterian Church."

== Collected works ==
"Samuel J. Wilson Papers, 1856-1926 (bulk 1860-1886)". Manuscripts Division, Princeton University Library. Department of Rare Books and Special Collections.

Academic offices
Preceded by Jonathan Edwards	Interim President of Washington and Jefferson College; 1869	Succeeded by James I. Brownson (Interim)
Religious titles
Preceded by The Rev. Howard Crosby	Moderator of the 86th General Assembly of the Presbyterian Church in the United States of America; 1874–1875	Succeeded by The Rev. Edward D. Morris
