= James Clark (college president) =

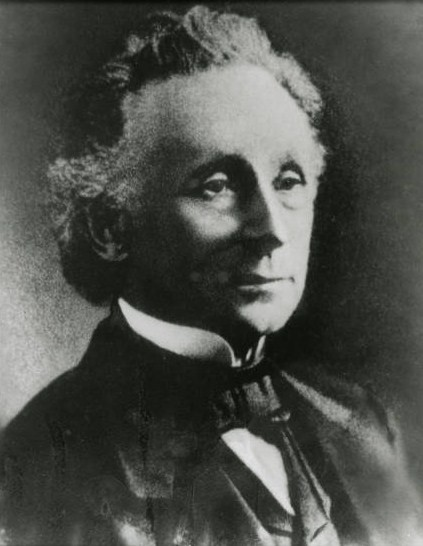
- Born: March 9, 1812; Philadelphia, Pennsylvania
- Died: 1892
- Education: University of Pennsylvania
- Church: Presbyterian
- Offices held: Fifth president of Washington College (1831-1849)

James Clark was the fifth president of Washington College

Clark was born on March 9, 1812, in Philadelphia, Pennsylvania. He attended the University of Pennsylvania, graduating in 1830. He was ordained by the Presbyterian Church on November 8, 1837. Before and after his presidency at Washington College, he was pastor at various churches in New Jersey and Pennsylvania. He was elected the fifth president of Washington College on May 6, 1850, where he was also Professor of Mental and Moral Science, and of the Hebrew, French and German Languages and Literature. Clark resigned the presidency on July 13, 1852.

== See also ==
- Washington & Jefferson College
- President of Washington & Jefferson College

Academic offices
Preceded by David McConaughy	President of Washington College; 1850–1852	Succeeded by James I. Brownson (Interim)
