= James I. Brownson =

James Irwin Brownson, Sr.
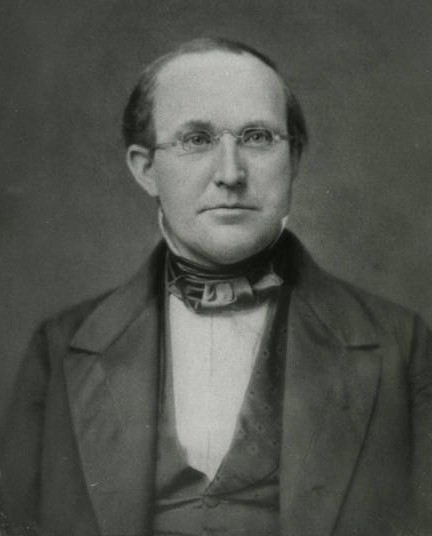
- Born: March 14, 1817; Mercersburg, Pennsylvania
- Died: 1899 (aged 81–82); Washington, Pennsylvania
- Education: Washington College; Western Theological Seminary
- Children: James I. Brownson

Ecclesiastical career
- Church: Presbyterian
- Ordained: October 10, 1840, at Greencastle, Pennsylvania (Presbytery of Carlisle)
- Congregations: First Presbyterian Church of Washington, Pennsylvania
- Offices held: President pro temp. of Washington & Jefferson College

James Irwin Brownson, Sr., D.D. (March 14, 1817 – 1899) was a clergyman and academic in Washington, Pennsylvania. He served as pastor of the First Presbyterian Church of Washington, Pennsylvania, for over 50 years.

== Biography ==
He was born on March 14, 1817, in Mercersburg, Pennsylvania. He was ordained by the Presbytery of Carlisle in 1840. He became minister of the First Presbyterian Church of Washington, Pennsylvania, in 1848.

Brownson was elected to the board of trustees of Washington College in 1849 served as President Pro Tem. there from July 13, 1852, until September 20, 1853. He was elected to serve in the consolidated board of Washington & Jefferson College after the union of the two colleges and was made President of the Board in 1882. He again served as President Pro Tem. in 1870. He also served as a trustee of the Washington Female Seminary and of the Western Theological Seminary (now Pittsburgh Theological Seminary.

He died in 1899 in Washington, Pennsylvania.

== Legacy ==
His son James Irwin Brownson, Jr. served as Judge of the Washington County Courts of Common Pleas and became the namesake of the Brownson House.

Academic offices
Preceded by James Clark	Interim President of Washington College; 1852–1853	Succeeded by John W. Scott
Preceded by Samuel J. Wilson (Interim)	Interim President of Washington and Jefferson College; 1870	Succeeded by George P. Hays
