= David McConaughy (college president) =

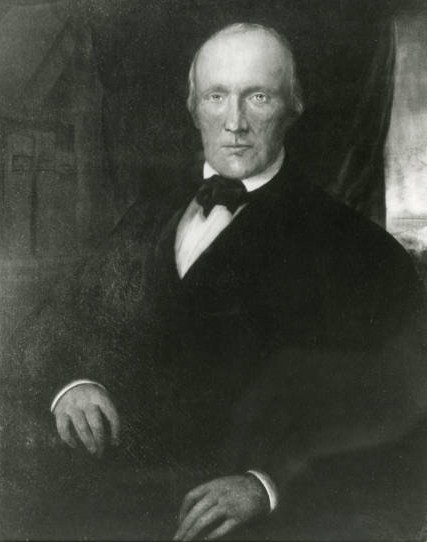
- Born: September 29, 1775; York County, Pennsylvania
- Died: January 29, 1852 (aged 76); Washington, Pennsylvania
- Education: Dickinson College
- Church: Presbyterian
- Offices held: Fourth president of Washington College (1831–1849)

David McConaughy (September 29, 1775 – January 29, 1852) was the fourth president of Washington College from 1831 to 1852.

== Early life ==
McConaughy was born in York County, now Adams County, Pennsylvania.

== Education ==
He graduated from Dickinson College in 1795 and went on to be the pastor of a church in Gettysburg, Pennsylvania.

== Career ==
McConaughy was elected president of Washington College on December 21, 1831. During his presidency Washington College expanded from one building to two with the construction of a new building. Also the number of graduates increased from three in 1832 to over fifty in 1849, his last year in office. McConaughy also helped organize and was appointed a Trustee of the Washington Female Seminary, which was established in 1837 near the College campus. In 1847 interest in uniting the two colleges of Jefferson and Washington again arose and although no action resulted, relations between the two colleges were friendly and it appeared that "The College War" was over. McConaughy resigned as president October 12, 1849, at the age of 74.

== Death ==
He died January 29, 1852, in Washington, Pennsylvania.

== Works ==
- McConaughy, D.D., David (June 1833). Rev. S.C. Jennings (ed.). "Sermon XVII: Christ, "The Lord Our Righteousness"". The Presbyterian Preacher. II (4). Pittsburgh: D. and M. MacLean: 305–316.

Academic offices
Preceded by David Elliott	President of Washington College; 1831–1849	Succeeded by James Clark
