= Thaddeus Dod =

American Presbyterian minister and educator

- Born: March 7, 1740; New Jersey
- Died: May 20, 1793 (aged 53); Cross Creek, Pennsylvania
- Education: College of New Jersey (now Princeton University)
- Spouse: Phoebe Baldwin Dodd
- Children: Cephas Dod
- Church: Presbyterian
- Ordained: 1777 by the Presbytery of New York

Thaddeus Dod (March 7, 1740 – May 20, 1793) was a prominent Presbyterian minister in Western Pennsylvania. He is one of the founders of Washington & Jefferson College.

Dod's ancestors were English Puritans who settled in Connecticut in 1645 and migrated to the Newark, New Jersey area. Dod was born in 1740 and was raised in the "hill town" of Mendham Borough in Morris County, New Jersey. In 1751 at the age of 11, he dedicated his life to "God and doctrine." Dod funded his education at the College of New Jersey (now Princeton University) by teaching for a number of years, graduating in 1773 at the age of 33. He married Phoebe Baldwin shortly thereafter. He continued to study theology and was licensed to preach in 1775. He was ordained by the Presbytery of New York in 1777 and left to preach at Patterson Creek, Hampshire County, Virginia (now in West Virginia)

In addition to a devotion to religion, Dod held a strong grasp of the classical subjects, especially the languages of Greek, Latin, and Hebrew. He exhibited an uncommon proficiency in literature and sciences; he composed poetry, often breaking into verse in a dead language in his diaries. As a preacher, he spoke on the importance of sacred music, a subject he studied scientifically, and introduced "singing without reading the line" to his congregations. In person, he was described as "dark and vivid, quick and ardent."

In 1778, Dod accepted a ministerial call from two congregations in present-day Washington County, Pennsylvania: Lindley's Fort at Lower Ten Mile near Amity (now Amwell Township, Pennsylvania) and Cook's Fort at Upper Ten Mile (Prosperity). He was the second minister to settle west of the Monongahela River and the first to establish a Presbytery west of the Allegheny Mountains. His family remained in Patterson Creek for two years before moving into a log cabin near his congregations. Dod's home was in a dangerous location near Fort Henry, perched on a steep rise with wooded valleys on either side. His home, log school, and churches were often subject to attacks from local Indian populations.

"Help me to take up my cross and follow Thee...I would desire nothing but to be Thine,-and that forever...Let no corrupt design lead me astray from the paths of simplicity and truth."

— Dod's "Covenant with God," appearing several times in his diary

In 1781, Dod and his neighbors built a log school building, the first of its kind in the west and much larger than any other dwelling in the settlement. In 1782, the school contained 13 pupils. It was furnished with three or four beds for students in attendance. Dod taught classes in English, the classics, mathematics, and surveying before its closure in 1785. He was one of the original trustees of Washington Academy, located in the Washington, Pennsylvania courthouse, and he held office as its first principal. The courthouse burned during the winter of 1790-1791, destroying Dod's collection of books. Dod also helped organize the academy in Canonsburg, Pennsylvania, which would later grow into Jefferson College.

== Family ==
Cephas Dod was the son of Thaddeus and Phoebe Baldwin Dod. Washington & Jefferson College president Simon Strousse Baker was their great great grandson. Steam engine builder Daniel Dod was their nephew, while educator Albert Baldwin Dod was their great-nephew.
