= Matthew Brown (college president) =

American Presbyterian minister (1776–1853)

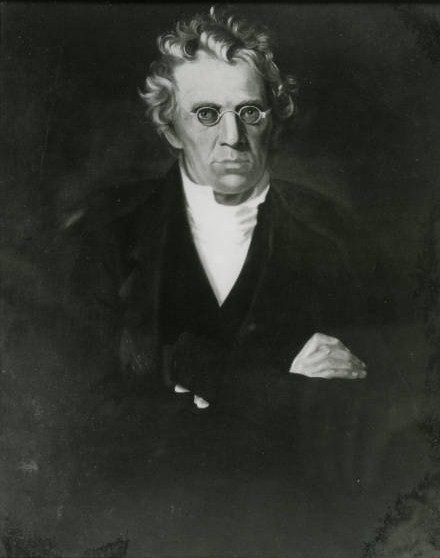
- Born: January 1776; Northumberland County, Pennsylvania (present day Union County, Pennsylvania)
- Died: July 29, 1853 (aged 77)
- Education: Dickinson College
- Church: Presbyterian
- Ordained: Presbytery of Carlisle, October 3, 1799
- Offices held: First president of Washington College; Fifth president of Jefferson College

Matthew Brown was a prominent Presbyterian minister and president of Washington College and Jefferson College. Next to John McMillan, Brown was the most important figure to education in Western Pennsylvania.

Brown was born in January 1776 in Northumberland County, Pennsylvania (now part of Union County, Pennsylvania). His paternal grandfather, a native of Ireland even though he was of Scottish descent, emigrated to America in 1720 and settled in eastern Pennsylvania. His father, also named Matthew Brown, was born in 1732 and was an early settler of White Deer Valley and a soldier in the American Revolutionary War. Upon his father's death, young Matthew Brown and his brother were adopted by their father's brother, William Brown, a religious man who was a member of the Pennsylvania Legislature.

Brown graduated from Dickinson College in 1794 and taught in a classical school in Northumberland County. In 1796, he began to study theology and was licensed to preach by the Presbytery of Carlisle on October 3, 1799. He held a call in Mifflin, Pennsylvania and Lost Creek within the Presbytery of Huntingdon.

On October 15, 1805 he was installed as preacher of the First Presbyterian Church of Washington, Pennsylvania. He was also elected principal of Washington Academy and was a principal agent in securing its charter to become Washington College; he was elected its first president on December 13, 1806, serving that position in tandem with his pastoral duties. The reputation of the college and the prosperity of the church grew considerably under his leadership. During this time, the town of Washington had grown from a small pioneer settlement into a larger town, and he vigorously denounced the growing practices of card playing and dances in his famous "Serpent Sermon." Brown was elected a member of the American Antiquarian Society in 1815. In 1817, and agreement was made between the church and Washington College that no one should supervise both institutions. Brown chose the church and resigned the presidency on April 30, 1817. He turned down offers of the presidency of Centre College and his alma mater Dickinson College to remain as pastor in Washington. He resigned that position in 1822 to accept the presidency of Jefferson College at Canonsburg.

On September 25, 1822, Brown was elected the fifth president of Jefferson College, largely due to the support and influence of Rev. Dr. Samuel Ralston, who was president of the Board of Trustees of Jefferson College. He was paid an annual salary of $800. In 1824, Jefferson College established the Jefferson Medical College in Philadelphia. The college erected Providence Hall between 1829 and 1832. Jefferson College graduated 770 students during his tenure. He resigned at the age of 69 in 1845 due to ill health. He died on July 29, 1853.

== Works ==
- Brown, D.D., Matthew (June 1833). Rev. S.C. Jennings (ed.). "Sermon XXV: The Dignity and Duties of the Ministry". The Presbyterian Preacher. II (10). Pittsburgh: D. and M. MacLean: 345–376.

Academic offices
| Preceded by Position created | President of Washington College; 1806–1817 | Succeeded by Andrew Wylie |
| Preceded by William McMillan | President of Jefferson College; 1822–1845 | Succeeded by Robert Jefferson Breckinridge |
