= List of Washington & Jefferson College buildings =

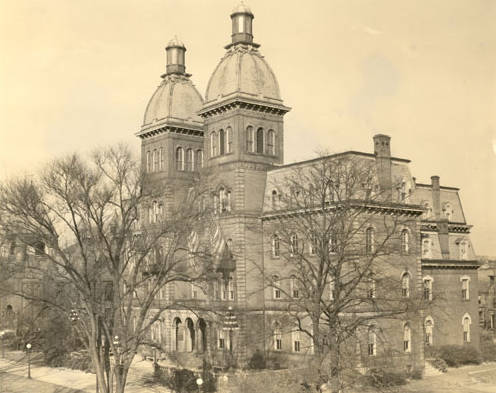
Old Main in the 1930s or 1940s

Washington & Jefferson College is a private liberal arts college in Washington, Pennsylvania, which is located in the Pittsburgh metropolitan area. The college traces its origin to three log cabin colleges in Washington County, Pennsylvania established by three Presbyterian missionaries to the American frontier in the 1780s: John McMillan, Thaddeus Dod, and Joseph Smith. These early schools eventually grew into two competing academies and colleges, with Canonsburg Academy, later Jefferson College, located in Canonsburg, Pennsylvania and Washington Academy, later Washington College, in Washington. These two colleges merged in 1865 to form Washington & Jefferson College.

The campus, the historic entrances of which are marked by brick gates, has over 40 buildings. The oldest surviving building is McMillan Hall, which dates to 1793 and is the oldest college building west of the Allegheny Mountains. The main academic building is Old Main, which is topped with two prominent towers. The Old Gym houses a modern exercise facility. McIlvaine Hall, which was originally home to a female seminary, was demolished in 2008 and replaced by the Swanson Science Center. The Olin Fine Arts Center is a 488-seat auditorium. Davis Memorial Hall was once a dormitory and private house. The Swanson Science Center and the Dieter-Porter Life Sciences Building both cater to the scientific curriculum. The Burnett Center and its sister building, the Technology Center, were built in the late 1990s and early 2000s.

The first dormitory on campus was Hays Hall. Wade House, Carriage House, and Whitworth House are Victorian homes housing older students. The recently constructed Chestnut Street Housing complex provides housing for the college's Greek organizations. The Presidents' Row is a cluster of ten buildings in the center of campus, several of which are dedicated to theme housing. Two sister dormitories, New Residence Hall and Bica-Ross Hall, feature suite-style living arrangements. Mellon Hall and Upperclass Hall house female and male freshmen, respectively. Other dormitories include Alexander Hall, Cooper Hall, Marshall Hall, North Hall, and Penn House. The college administration utilizes several buildings, including the Admissions House, the Alumni House, and the President's House, which are all modified Victorian homes. The Clark Family Library is the modern library; its predecessor, Thompson Hall, is now used for administrative purposes. The Hub, the Commons, and the Rossin Campus Center provide recreational and dining facilities for students. The athletic and intramural teams utilize Cameron Stadium for football and track. The Henry Memorial Center is used for basketball, wrestling, swimming, and volleyball. Other athletic facilities include Brooks Park, Ross Memorial Park and Alexandre Stadium, and the Janet L. Swanson Tennis Courts.

== Campus ==
The modern campus of Washington & Jefferson College is located in the City of Washington and the East Washington Borough, small-town communities about 30 miles (48 km) south of Pittsburgh. The 60-acre (0.24 km^{2}) campus is home to more than 40 academic, administrative, recreational, and residential buildings. The northern edge of campus is bound by East Walnut Street, the western edge by South College Street, the southern edge by East Maiden Street, and the eastern edge by South Wade. Portions of the campus extend into the East Washington Historic District.

Four historic gates mark four traditional entrances to campus at East Maiden Street, Wheeling Street, South College Street, and Beau Street. The South College Street gate marks the western entrance to campus, and was built in 1948 by members of the Phi Gamma Delta fraternity, in honor of the 100th anniversary of the fraternity's founding at Jefferson College in 1848. That brick gate opens to a stone path leading to Old Main. The fraternity refurbished the gate in 1998. The reliefs on the southern gate at East Maiden Street, called the Algeo Gateway, show the roots of the college, with one showing John McMillan and his log college, and the other showing Thaddeus Dod and the founding of Washington Academy.

In 1947, the Pennsylvania Historical and Museum Commission installed a historical marker noting the historic importance of the college.

== Academic buildings ==
=== Old Main ===
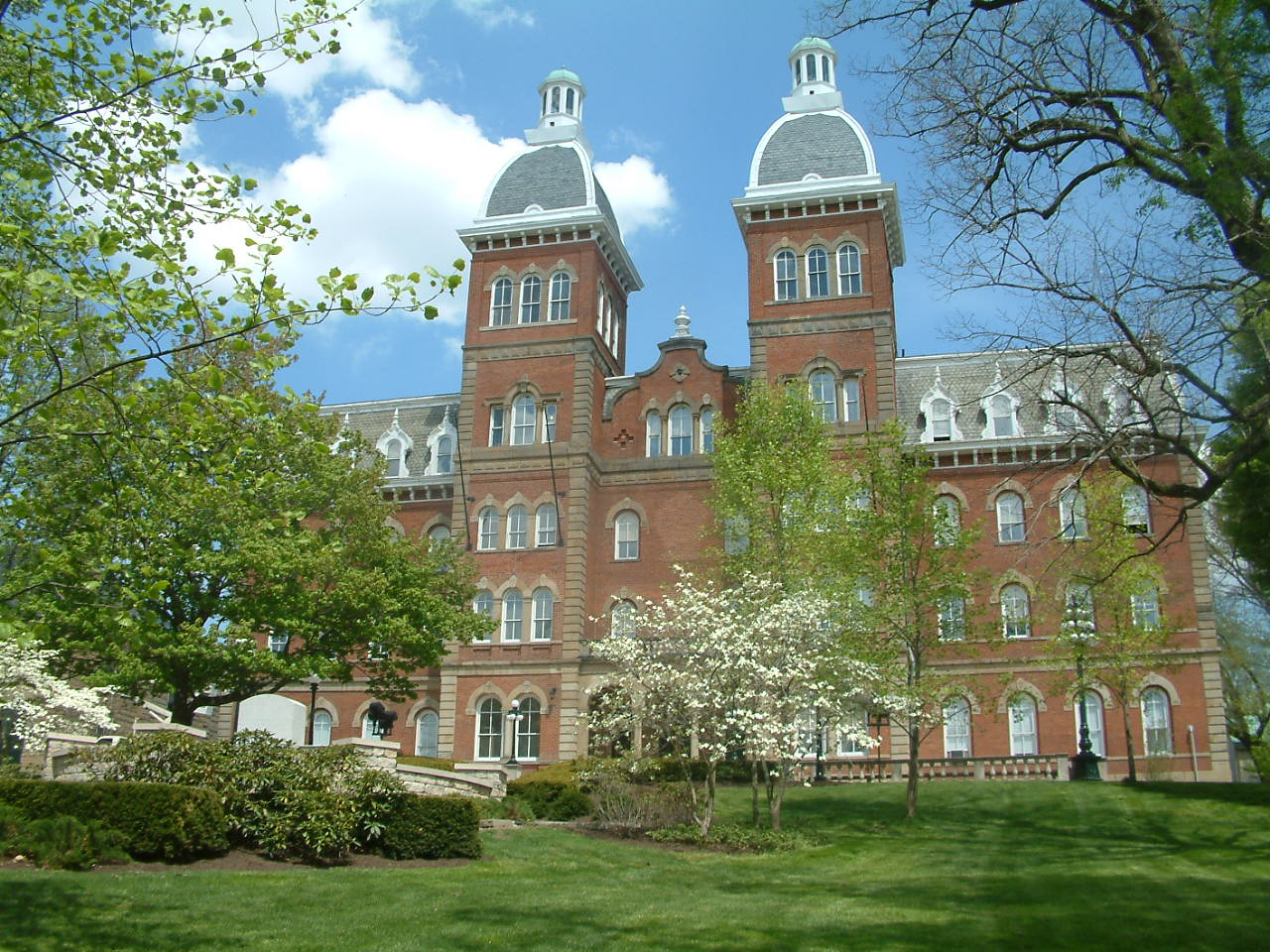
Modern-day Old Main during the spring

The main academic building on campus is Old Main. It is the predominant building on campus. Its two identical towers, added in 1875, symbolize the union of Washington College and Jefferson College to form Washington & Jefferson College. The towers appear on the college seal, in a stylized version. The college fundraising operation founded "The Old Main Society" in 1996 to recognize individuals who utilize planned giving.

The building's configuration has changed considerably since its construction in 1850, when it became the second building on the campus on Washington Academy. Originally a two-story structure with architecture matching the colonial facade of McMillan Hall, it has since doubled in height, received two towers, and expanded through multiple wing additions. The building currently houses the academic departments of mathematics, history, religious studies, and political science. The office of the College Chaplain, called the "Pastor's Study," is on the ground floor and was used as a main setting for the 1993 George A. Romero film, The Dark Half. Room E contains one of the college's computer labs. The campus' Office of Protection Services is headquartered in Old Main.

=== McIlvaine Hall ===
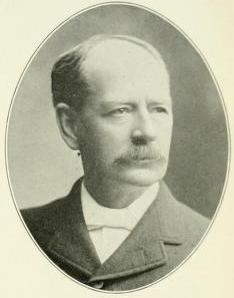
Judge John Addson McIlvaine

The building later known as McIlvaine Hall was home to the Washington Female Seminary prior to its acquisition by the college in 1940, when the Seminary closed permanently. It was built in 1897 by Pittsburgh-based female architect Elise Mercur Wagner who supervised every facet of its construction. After the college purchased the brick building with a limestone foundation, it was renamed after Judge John Addison McIlvaine, an 1865 graduate of Jefferson College. The John L. Stewart Clock Tower on the northwest corner of the building, named in honor of John L. Stewart, who published of two local newspapers, contained a chime to note the hour. The portico was modeled after the portico of Mount Vernon. The chime room, containing the 26-note Stephen Collins Foster Carillon, was given to the college by the Women's Auxiliary of Allegheny County on Founder's Day in 1937. In the 1980s, the chime system was replaced by a cassette system. The north wing of the building contained a college theater. The tower was topped with a four-faced clock given in memory of David F. McGill, an 1881 alumnus. The building housed classrooms and faculty offices for the Departments of Philosophy, Sociology, and the Environmental Studies Program, as well as some classrooms for English courses. McIlvaine was demolished in summer 2008 to make room for the new Swanson Science Center. Shortly before its demolition, President Tori Haring-Smith took a group of alumni on a tour of the building.

=== Old Gym ===
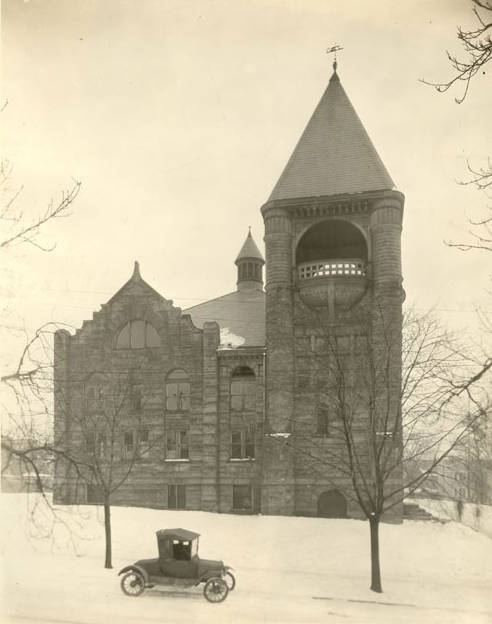
The Old Gym in 1922

The Old Gym is an historic athletic training center and gymnasium, currently housing the Swanson Wellness Center, a modern exercise facility featuring cardiovascular, resistance, and strength training equipment. The building also features a three-lane indoor track suspended above the main floor. Prior to the construction of the Old Gym, students exercised and engaged in athletics under the grandstands at College Field. The exterior is Cleveland sandstone. In the early years, the interior space was used for basketball and as an auditorium. The basement once held a bowling alley and a swimming pool. Following renovations in 1927, where the interior was re-faced with brick and the swimming pool was expanded, the building was supposed to have been turned into a memorial hall for President James D. Moffat, but those plans never materialized. By 1938, the building was unable to host any intercollegiate athletic events, and during World War II, it was used as the Army Administration School. After the construction of the Henry Memorial Center, the building no longer housed any athletic events. Instead, the Old Gym was used for student activities and maintenance. In 2002, the basketball court area of the Old Gym was renovated and turned into the Swanson Wellness Center.

=== Davis Memorial Hall ===
Marking the southern border of campus, Davis Memorial Hall abuts U.S. Route 40. The white-painted brick structure was constructed in the American colonial architecture style in 1847 by Alexander Reed, a college trustee, who used it as his residence. It was once a stop on the Underground Railroad. In the early 1930s, it was photographed by Charles M. Stotz in preparation for writing his book, Early Architecture of Western Pennsylvania. In 1939, it was acquired by the college and used as a dormitory for 33 students. In the 1940s, it was converted to the Electrical Engineering Building. In 1947, the building was renamed from the Reed Dormitory to Davis Memorial Hall in honor of Harry Hamilton and Tillie Wilkinson Davis, who provided the funds for a major remodeling project. Following that renovation, the building housed offices and classrooms for the Department of English. A duplicate of the original cast-iron fence currently surrounds the building.

=== Thistle Physics Building ===
The Thistle Physics building was built in 1912 and was named after Dr. Joseph Long Thistle, who donated the funds for its construction. It was home to the Department of Physics until moving to the Swanson Science Center in 2010. The building contained four teaching laboratories, three research labs, lecture rooms, and a fully equipped machine shop. In early May 2018 the college building was in the demolition process, and as of 2024 the land remains vacant.

=== Lazear Chemistry Hall ===
The Lazear Chemistry Hall was constructed in the Georgian style between 1939 and 1949. It was designed by Frederick Larson and was named after former student Jesse William Lazear, who helped develop the cure for yellow fever. In 2010, the Department of Chemistry moved from Lazear to the new Swanson Science Center. With 50 rooms, including a nationally recognized polymer lab, a darkroom, a 100-seat lecture hall, and a main supply room with an acid room and hazardous chemical vault. The campus chapter of the Student Affiliates of the American Chemical Society produces an annual "Fear at Lazear" haunted house. The door to the Troutman Library on the first floor of Lazear holds the original doorknob from Tara, the main plantation house from the 1939 movie Gone with the Wind. It was donated to the college in May 1940 by the film's producer and Pittsburgh native David O. Selznick, who had family in the Washington area. A faulty heating system and general disrepair spurred the construction of the Swanson Science Center, where the chemistry department moved in 2010.

=== Dieter-Porter Life Sciences Building ===
The Dieter-Porter Life Science Building, was built in 1981 and totals 50,000 square feet (4,600 m^{2}) in size. It contains classrooms, laboratories, and an auditorium. The building was named after two longtime Professors who were largely responsible for establishing the college's scientific reputation, Dr. Clarence D. Dieter and Dr. Homer C. Porter. The building also contains a library, which contains a study lounge, work space, and a meeting room. It was renovated in 2007 by the Phi Sigma biology honor society, who provided new paint, carpet, and furniture. The second floor contains the Meditation Room, with a small altar and limited seating. It was furnished by funds provided by the Women's Auxiliary and is in memory of Helen Turnbull Waite Coleman, who authored Banners in the Wilderness, a book about the early years of the college. The third floor contains a 700 square feet (65 m^{2}) greenhouse, with a potting room, wooden benches, and skylights. During the winter, the plants are illuminated by timed electric lights. The greenhouse is used for the cultivation of plant specimens, especially tropical, that are used for classroom experiments and demonstrations. Space is also reserved for student projects. The building is also home to the United States Department of Defense-funded Combat Stress Intervention Program to develop solutions to poor access to health care for soldiers returning from the Iraq and Afghanistan. In 2008, the Biology Department (and the college) was awarded a $1 million programmatic grant from the Howard Hughes Medical Institute, a portion of which will be used to help establish bioinformatics lab space in Dieter-Porter.

The building will be renovated as part of the Science Initiative, which has already constructed the Swanson Science Center. The planned renovations will construct new common areas and a new entrance, install a new HVAC system, and improve the animal laboratory. Particularly troubling was the poor drainage, which led to flooding and mold accumulation, threatening the sterility of the laboratories. In 2011, it was announced that $1 million of the $9 million renovation cost would be funded through a Redevelopment Capital Assistance Program state grant.

=== Olin Fine Arts Center ===
The Olin Fine Arts Center houses a 488-seat auditorium and the Olin Art Gallery. It also houses classrooms and the Department of Art, Theatre, and Communication, and the Department of Music. Funding for its construction in 1982 was provided by the F. W. Olin Foundation, as well as the Eden Hall Foundation. It was home to the Vilar Distinguished Artist Series from 1999 to 2003. Andrew Druckenbrod, classical music critic for the Pittsburgh Post-Gazette, said, while reviewing a 2003 performance of the Bavarian Radio Symphony Orchestra, that the "downside is that multipurpose Olin is not nearly equipped to handle such a group, either in stage size or acoustics. But cramped environs, blinking lighting and inadequate reverberation didn't deter the youthful orchestra from a deft performance." Mark Kanny, classical music critic for the Pittsburgh Tribune-Review, said, while reviewing a 2001 performance of Valery Gergiev conducting the Kirov Orchestra, that "the [small] size of Olin actually added to the effectiveness of the concert. The music was heard in a more intimate environment and had more impact."

=== The Burnett Center ===
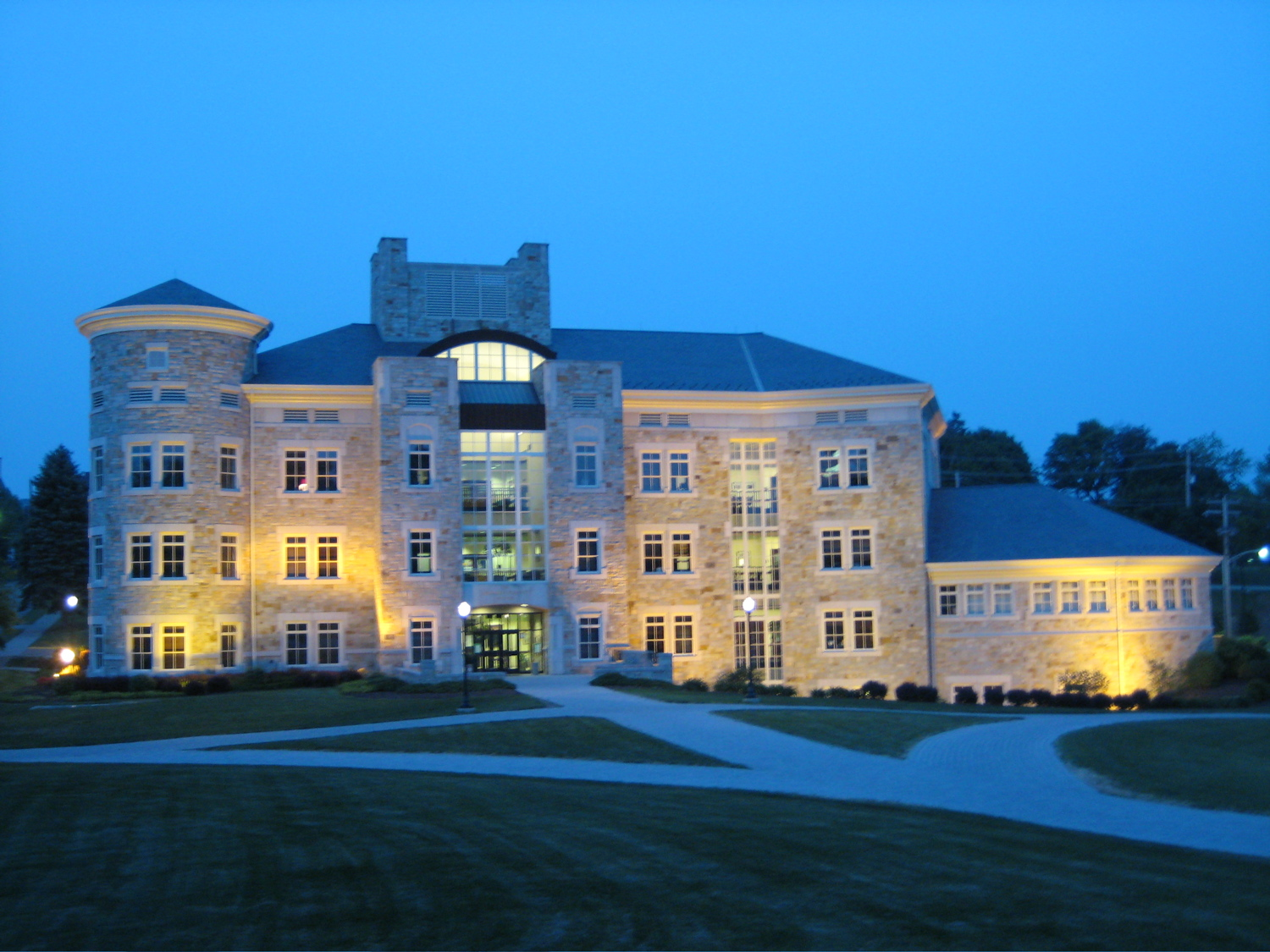
The Burnett Center, as viewed at night

A granite and limestone building, The Burnett Center anchors the northeastern border of campus. It houses the Departments of Economics and Business, Modern Languages, and Education, as well as the Yost Auditorium, an 84-seat lecture hall. The four seminar rooms, located in the tower structure of the left side of the building, feature 16-seat octagonal tables. The building was completed in 2001 at a cost of $12.8 million. It is named after Howard J. Burnett, who served as president from 1970 to 1998.

The entrance plaza includes a fountain and a grassed bowl area in the lower plaza. The tower element on the left side of the building is intended to match the most prominent building on campus, Old Main. The interior railings include cast iron fleur-de-lis balusters from Hays Hall, the first dormitory on campus, that was demolished in 1994. The large vertical ribbon window assemblies and atrium provide a view of the rest of campus. The architecture and masonry work won several national awards.

=== Technology Center ===
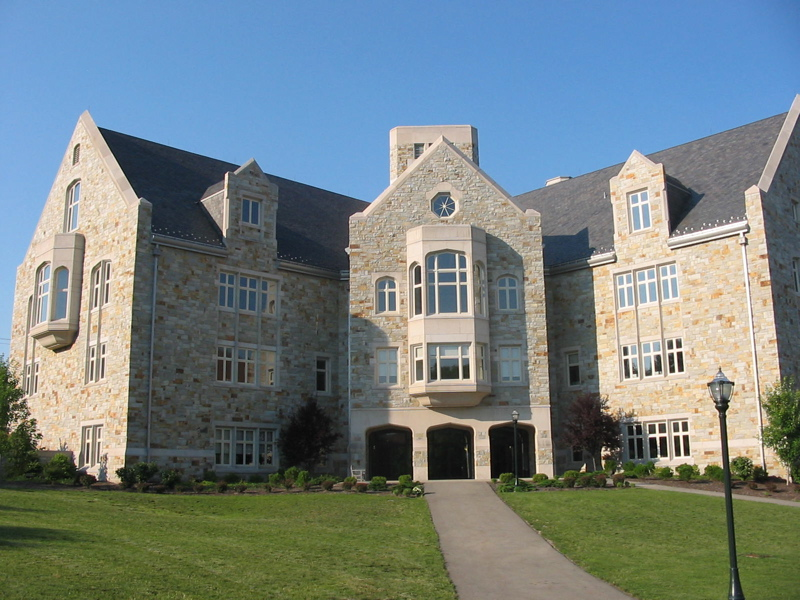
The Technology Center

The Technology Center houses the Information Technology Leadership program. All told, it houses over 200 instructional computers for use by the Information Technology Leadership and related classes. A statue of a coal miner, representing the work ethic and spirit of Western Pennsylvania, sits in the green space in front of the building.

The building was formerly known as the Vilar Technology Center, in honor of alumnus Alberto Vilar, who had pledged $18.1 million to construct the building. After he reneged on that pledge in 2003, the building was renamed the Technology Center and plans for its completion were scaled back. It is the sister building to The Burnett Center, sharing the same architect and general contractor.

=== Swanson Science Center ===
The newest building on campus is the John A. Swanson Science Center, which was completed in February 2010. It was named after John A. Swanson, an engineer and businessman on the Board of Trustees, who donated $10 million towards its construction. This facility, containing 47,500 square feet (4,410 m^{2}) of space, houses classrooms for Chemistry, Physics, Biophysics and Biochemistry and was designed to match its neighboring historic campus architecture. Its learning facilities include wet and dry teaching laboratories, faculty and student research laboratories, and a multi-disciplinary lab designed for non-science majors.

The marble-lined grand entrance leads to a three-story atrium with marble pillars and Palladian windows facing Route 40 and the common area is designed to attract non-science students. It was designed to satisfy the LEED Silver qualifications for green buildings.

The site of the Swanson Science Center is home to a historical marker in honor of Rebecca Harding Davis, an influential journalist and author who had attended the Washington Female Seminary, which had been on that site. The effort to place the marker there was led by Washington & Jefferson College English professor, and Harding descendant, Dr. Jennifer Harding.

== Residence halls ==
=== Hays Hall ===
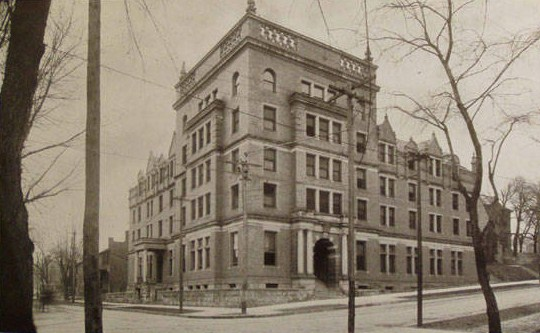
Hays Hall circa 1913

The first residence hall at Washington & Jefferson College was Hays Hall. The architectural work on that building was performed by Frederick J. Osterling and it was named after President George P. Hays. Construction was completed in 1903 and the new "fireproof" building was opened to Washington & Jefferson Academy students. Rooms were arranged in a suite style, with communal bathrooms on each floor, and shower baths on the 5th floor.

In 1912, the academy closed and Hays Hall was used by Washington & Jefferson College students. At various times, Hays Hall housed the bookstore and a dining hall. By 1968, Hays Hall had deteriorated to the point where it was no longer able to house students, but the bookstore remained. In 1982, the building was declared a fire hazard and closed for all uses. While various efforts sought to renovate or restore Hays Hall, including a push to have it named a historical landmark, Hays Hall was demolished in 1994.

=== Wade House, Carriage House, and Whitworth House ===
The college owns three Victorian houses on the periphery of campus that are used as alternative living spaces for students. The college acquired Wade House, a late 19th-century Victorian mansion, in 1986. After a total renovation in 2007 and replacing the windows in 2008, it now houses upper-class women. Whitworth House is a mid 19th century Victorian mansion that was acquired by the college 1997. Originally known as Kimm House, it houses roughly 25 upper-class females.

=== Mellon Hall and Upperclass Hall ===
Mellon Hall and Upperclass Hall are adjacent freshman dormitories. Mellon Hall, which houses women, is named in memory of James Ross Mellon, an 1865 graduate of Jefferson College; funding for its construction in 1949 was provided by the W.L. and May T. Mellon Foundation. 2008 renovation project expanded and redesigned the bathrooms, upgraded the electrical system, and installed sprinklers. Upperclass Hall, which currently houses men, was also built in 1949. It was renovated in 2008 to improve the bathrooms, upgrade the electrical system, and to install sprinklers.

=== Presidents' Row ===
Presidents' Row is a cluster of ten buildings in the center of campus, with all but 2 being named after a former President of the United States: Adams, Buchanan, Cleveland, Fillmore, Grant, Jefferson, Monroe, and Washington. Each unit contains a lounge, meeting rooms, and living areas for up to 35 students. Some rooms are air-conditioned. In addition to standard co-educational living arrangements, Presidents' Row is also home to various theme housing arrangements, including the "Pet House," the Service Leadership House, and the WashPa Radio House. Built in 1968, they were originally called the Residential Center, then The Quads. Fraternities, and then sororities after 1970, were early occupants. In the fall of 2005, these organizations were moved to Chestnut Street housing. In late September 2024, it was announced that Harrison Hall, which had been named for William Henry Harrison, would be renamed to Riesenman Hall. In March 2025, the college announced it would be renaming Lincoln Hall, which was named for Abraham Lincoln to 1970 Hall. The renaming of both Harrison and Lincoln Halls sparked outrage among the student body.

=== New Residence Hall and Bica-Ross Hall ===
New Residence Hall and Bica-Ross Hall are sister dormitories, featuring suite-style living arrangements. New Residence Hall provides 24 living units, each with a common area, two single rooms, and a double room. It was constructed in 2002, with the 4th floor completed in 2004. In 2009–10, it housed 108 co-educational upperclass students. Funds for the construction of Bica-Ross Hall provided by Violet Ross in honor of her husband, L. Clayton Ross, who was a 1930 graduate. Constructed in 2004, living units in Bica Ross Hall have four single rooms with a common area.

Bica Ross was constructed on the site of the former Trinity Episcopal Church, which had been surrounded on 3 sides by college property, making it a virtual part of the campus. In 1998, the college purchased the church's building, including the rectory and parish house, for $1.55 million. The congregation of 200 voted to accept the offer in order to build a larger church south of the town. Following the sale, the pastor expressed hope that the college would keep the building as a chapel. The church had been constructed in 1863.

=== Chestnut Street Housing ===
The Chestnut Street Housing student housing development is a series of 10 houses on Chestnut Street. The buildings are designed to look more like homes, rather than dorms, with front porches and living rooms. When they were constructed in 2005, all 10 were intended to serve as "theme houses," for groups of like-minded students who share common social or academic interests. By 2008, 8 of the 10 buildings were occupied by Greek organizations. Two years later, all 10 buildings were occupied by Greek organizations.

=== Other dormitories ===
Alexander Hall, named after former president of the board of trustees Park J. Alexander, was constructed in 1968 and is laid out with a suite-style floor plan. In the 2009–2010 academic year, it housed co-ed upperclass students. Marshall Hall was built in 1969 and is named after Elder W. Marshall, former president of the board of trustees. It is a co-ed facility with a suite-style floor plan. During the 2009–2010 academic year, it housed 128 both first year and upper-class coeducational students. Cooper Hall, formerly Beau Hall, is similar to Alexander and Marshall, but is built in a "U" shape with two separate wings. During the 2009–2010 academic year, it only housed women. Penn House, situated between Marshall Hall and the Chestnut Street Housing complex, offers double-style living space for 17 individuals. North Hall was a freshman men's dormitory, but is currently unused. It was originally the chapter house of Phi Gamma Delta, before the fraternity moved to their new residence on Chestnut Street. It was renovated in the summer of 2006.

== Administrative buildings ==
=== McMillan Hall ===
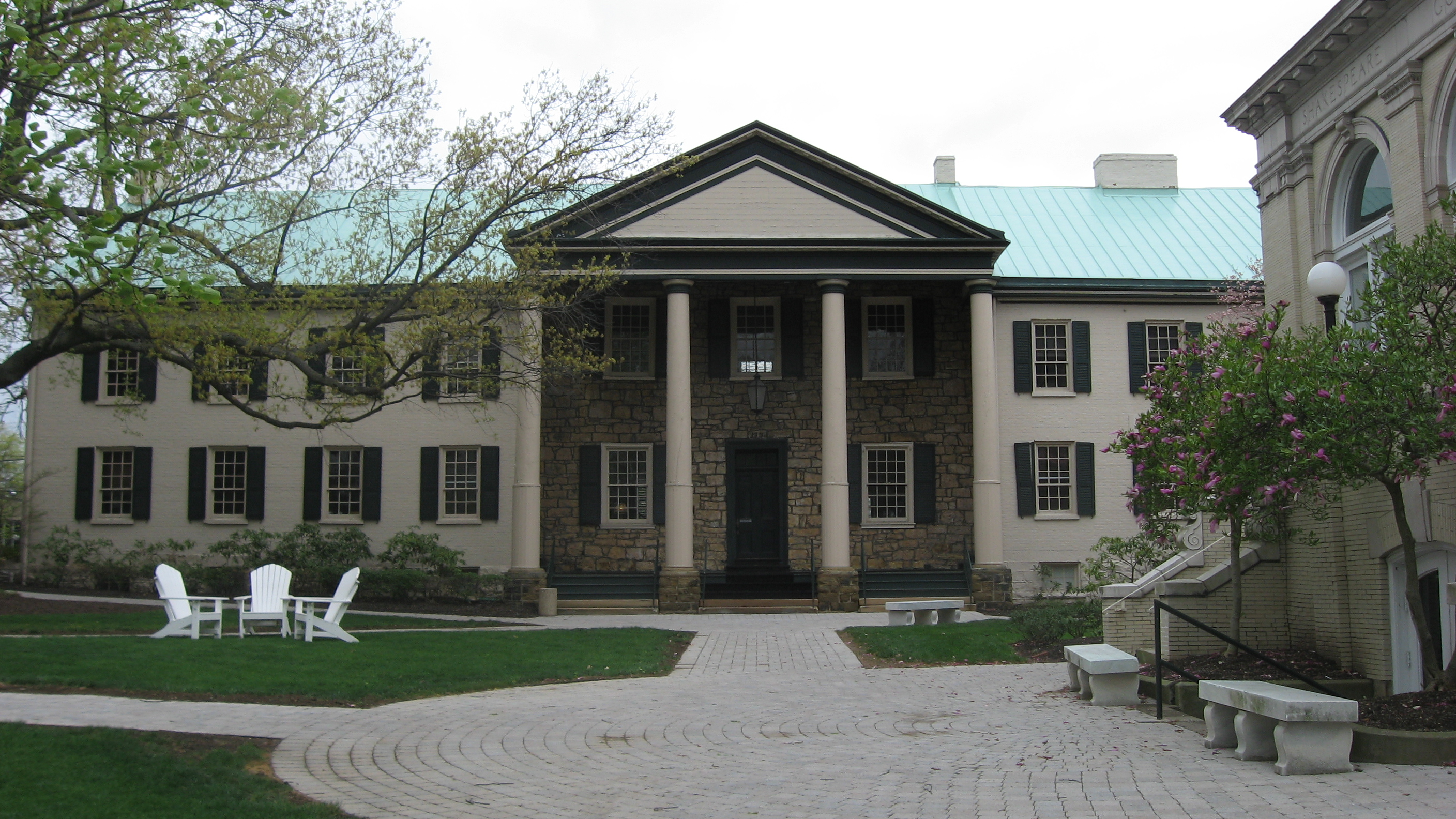
Present-day McMillan Hall, with Thompson Hall visible on the right

The oldest building on campus is McMillan Hall, which was built in 1793 and served as the only building for the old Washington Academy. It is the eighth-oldest academic building in the United States that is still in use for its original academic purpose, and is the oldest surviving college building west of the Allegheny Mountains, which was considered part of the American frontier during the Colonial period.

It is situated on the corner of South Lincoln Street and East Wheeling Street in Washington, Pennsylvania. It has undergone significant changes and expansions since its construction, with the addition of two large wings and a front portico. Throughout its history, McMillan Hall has housed classrooms, student housing, dining facilities, the college bookstore, and administrative offices. McMillan Hall is named after college founder and Presbyterian missionary John McMillan. It has also been known as the "Old College," the "Academy Building," and the "Administration Building." It is currently home to administrative offices, including the Office of Communications, and the Office of the President. The college's ceremonial mace is carved from the original wooden pillars.

In 1977, it was listed on the National Register of Historic Places. The National Register described the building's architecture as achieving a "unique quality and charm from the fact that vernacular builders selectively borrowed Georgian, Roman Classical, Adamesque, and other European Renaissance architectural forms, elements, and details and combined them in the builder's own esoteric way." The National Register described its historical importance as a "unique variation of a Western Pennsylvania stone building," calling it "irreplaceable on a regional or national level."

=== Admissions House ===
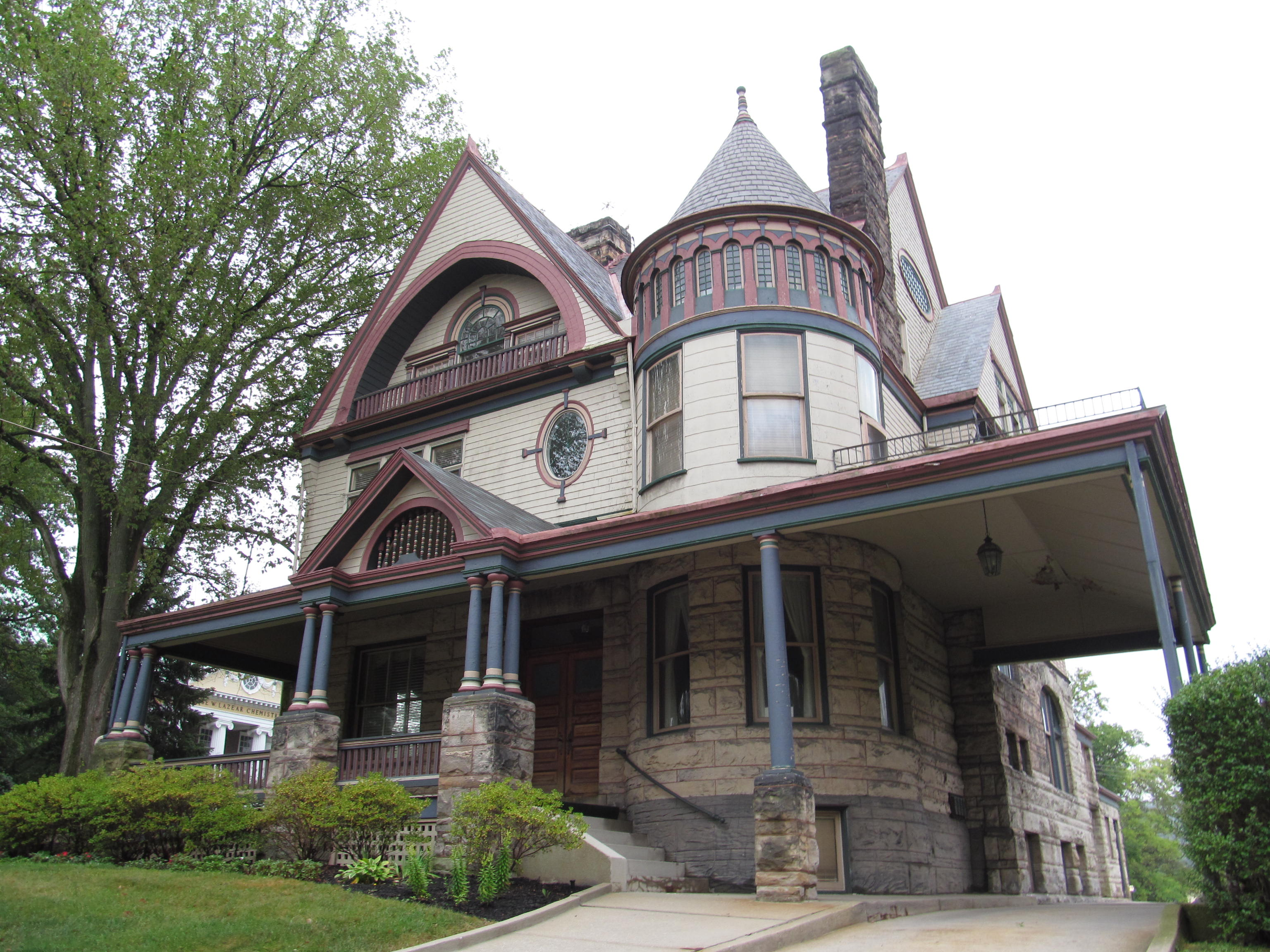
The Admissions House in 2012

The Admissions House is a Victorian mansion built in 1894 as the residence of Andrew Happer, who had been a student at Washington College before quitting to fight in the American Civil War. Before being acquired by the college in 1984, it was the Piatt Funeral Home.

=== Alumni House ===
The Alumni House on Wheeling Street is the headquarters for the Alumni Relations office. It was obtained by the college from local attorney William S. Parker in 1989. Before being used as the Alumni House beginning in 2005, it was called Wheeling House and was used as an upper-class dormitory. It contains a mahogany-paneled study, a parlor with a fireplace, and a walnut-paneled dining room, all used for alumni activities. During the final exam period, student use these facilities as a quiet study area.

=== President's House ===
The President's House is a 17-room Victorian mansion where the College President resides. It was built in 1892 by the Duncan family, of Duncan glass fame. Its design is archetypical Queen Anne Victorian style, with ornate "gingerbread" details, stained and beveled glass, recessed doors and windows, and louvered wooden shutters. In 1944, Walter Hudson Baker, class of 1907, donated the house to the college in memory of his wife, Amy Duncan Baker; it has been used as the President's House since. It was profiled in a book of regional architecture by the Washington County History and Landmarks Foundation.

=== Thompson Hall ===
The college's first unified library was in Thompson Hall, which was constructed in 1905. Funds for its construction were provided by William R. Thompson of Pittsburgh's in honor of his mother. His wife, Mary Thaw Thompson, later established a fund for library. The building is sandstone, with hand-laid mosaic tile floors and skylights. It was lit by electric lights and heated by steam. In addition to the college's holdings and those of the various literary societies, the library held the Walker Room, a room with fine furnishings, Tiffany lamps, and John Walker's personal library of 5,000 volumes. From its construction until the 1970s, its steps and green space held the commencement exercises. The building is sandstone, with hand-laid mosaic tile floors and skylights. In 1965, this room was transferred to the Clark Family Library. In 2004, the building was remodeled into administrative facilities.

=== The Hub ===
As a center of student activity on campus, the Hub has offices for student clubs, student government, and other various administrative offices. Before being renovated in 2007, it was known as the ITS Building. Its original purpose was to serve as a student center. It currently provides meeting and recreational areas for students, complete with an outdoor patio, lounge areas, multimedia entertainment centers with various gaming consoles, table tennis tables, foosball, and a pool table. The ground floor is used for "Monticello's Coffee House," which offers free drinks and food on weekends.

=== Clark Family Library Library ===
The college's academic library collection is located in the Clark Family Library; originally named the U. Grant Miller Library. With its origins tracing back to a donation from Benjamin Franklin in 1789, the collection currently holds 210,000 volumes. The Archives and Special Collections contain significant holdings of historical papers dating to the college's founding. The Walker Room contains the personal library of prominent industrialist John Walker, complete with all of his library's fixtures and furniture, installed exactly how it had been during Walker's life.

=== The Commons ===
The Commons, which contains the main dining facility on campus, also contains the Malcolm Parcell Room, which contains a number of works by noted local artist Malcolm Parcell. The Commons houses the main offices for the college radio station WNJR, and the college newspaper Red & Black. Additionally, the Ski Lodge, located in the ground floor, has a fireplace and gathering areas. The building is connected to the Rossin Campus Center by a bridge.

=== Rossin Campus Center ===
The Rossin Campus Center is a student activity center and administrative building in the center of campus. It is named after former trustee Pete C. Rossin and was built in 1994. During the planning stages in 1991, the college asked the City of Washington to close South Lincoln Street between East Maiden and East Chestnut Street and reroute the traffic through College Street, which would have been made into a two-way street. The college was concerned about the increasing frequency of accidents between pedestrians and automobiles on that street, pointing to a recent incident involving an injured maintenance worker and the fact that there had been 6 other similar accidents in the previous 15 years. The new campus center would only increase pedestrian traffic on that street. The proposal was defeated by the City Council 5–0.

The architecture work was performed by MacLachlan, Cornelius & Filoni, who won the Citation of Merit Pittsburgh Chapter American Institute of Architects award for Building Excellence and the Educational Design Excellence from the American School & University magazine. The building, which is connected to the Commons via a bridge, contains rooms designed for meetings, events, seminars, and conferences. It also is home to the College Bookstore, and George & Tom's Place. The Rossin Ballroom is a multi-purpose space that can be used for dances, banquets, performances. Behind the mail room is a common area with pool tables and other activities for students.

== Other buildings ==
A chapel had existed on North Lincoln Street.

== Athletic facilities ==
The first athletic facility at Washington & Jefferson was the Old Gym. College Field was purchased in 1885. Originally a fairground, it was developed into a proper athletic field after the discovery of oil on the grounds. It was renovated in 1999 and rechristened Cameron Stadium after the addition of an all-weather track, the installation of a FieldTurf football field, and renovated grandstands and media facilities. In 1970, the Henry Memorial Center was built. It houses a main gymnasium for basketball, wrestling, and volleyball, as well as an auxiliary basketball court, two handball courts, a wrestling practice room, and a weightroom. The natatorium, a six-lane, 25-yard pool, with depths ranging four to seven feet deep, hosts the men's and women's swimming and diving teams as well as the men's and women's water polo squads. The adjacent Janet L. Swanson Tennis Courts, first built 1955 and renovated in 2001, are home to the tennis teams. The softball team plays at Brooks Park, which was extensively renovated in 2004.

The Ross Memorial Park and Alexandre Stadium is a combined multi-purpose outdoor athletic facility for the baseball and soccer teams. At 233,000 square feet (21,600 m^{2}) of FieldTurf playing surface, the facility was the home of the largest continuous artificial playing surface in the world at its completion in 2004. The Swanson Wellness Center is a modern exercise facility located within the Old Gym. It contains a variety of strength and cardiovascular training equipment, including treadmills, exercise bikes, elliptical running machines, free weight machines, a weight rack, squat racks, and a three-lane indoor track suspended above the main floor. The hockey team plays at the IceoPlex at Southpointe.

== Buildings in Canonsburg ==
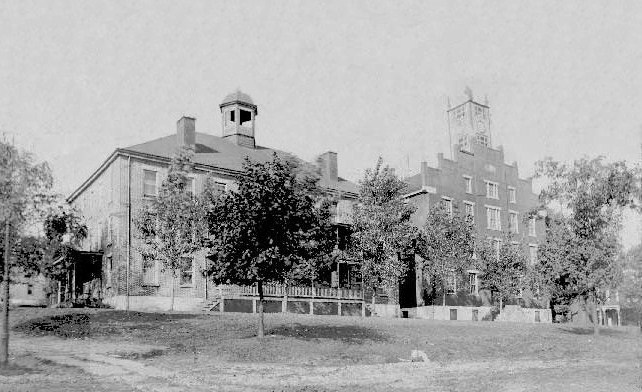
Jefferson College campus in the 1830s, with West College on the left and Providence Hall on the right

The original college building, John McMillan's Log School was built in 1780 near Chartiers. The original cabin was destroyed by fire, but rebuilt by McMillan in the late 1780s. This log school has been preserved and is located beside the middle school in Canonsburg. The first Jefferson College building in Canonsburg was the Stone College Building, which was constructed on land donated Colonel John Canon. It was demolished in 1843 to make room for a new town hall.

Providence Hall, a red brick building with a tower, housed classrooms, the college library, and the refectory. It was built in 1832. The name was suggested by Moses Allen, who was President of the Board and the son-in-law John McMillan, the college's founder. It had three floors plus a basement, but a peak on the roof gave the impression of a fifth floor. From 1832 to 1890 it was a meeting place for Presbyterian Church of Canonsburg. In 1966, it was razed to build a junior high school.

West College Building was razed 1912 to build a high school.

Four dormitory buildings, called "Forts," housed Jefferson students: Fort Ballantine, Fort McClelland, Fort Hunt, and Fort Armstrong. Two other buildings were constructed on campus, including a College President's home that was demolished in 1938 to build the Canonsburg Armory, and another home built in 1815 that housed college presidents and professors that was demolished in 1966.
