= Washington & Jefferson Presidents =

- University: Washington & Jefferson College
- Nickname: Presidents
- NCAA: Division III
- Conference: Presidents' Athletic Conference (primary); MPSF (water polo)
- Athletic director: Scott McGuinness
- Location: Washington, Pennsylvania, U.S.
- Varsity teams: 26 (28 in 2026–27)
- Football stadium: Cameron Stadium
- Basketball arena: Henry Memorial Center
- Baseball stadium: Ross Memorial Park
- Soccer stadium: Alexandre Stadium
- Other venues: Brooks Park; Janet L. Swanson Tennis Courts; Henry Memorial Natatorium
- Colors: Red and black
- Mascot: George Washington & Thomas Jefferson
- Website: gopresidents.com
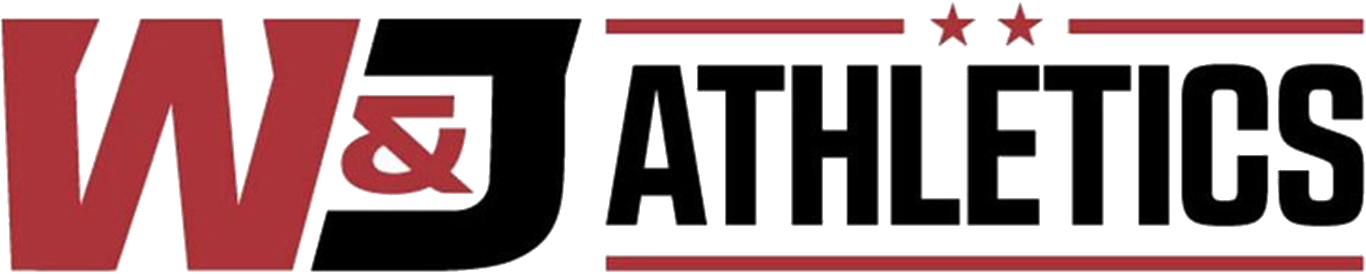

The Washington & Jefferson Presidents are the intercollegiate athletic teams for Washington & Jefferson College. The name "Presidents" refers to the two presidential namesakes of the college, George Washington and Thomas Jefferson. W&J is a member of the Presidents' Athletic Conference, the Eastern College Athletic Conference, and play in Division III of the National Collegiate Athletic Association in both men's and women's varsity sports. During the 2005–2006 season, 34 percent of the student body played varsity-level athletics.

W&J competes in 28 intercollegiate athletics at the NCAA Division III level.

Entering the 2026-27 academic year, the Presidents have won 158 Presidents' Athletic Conference team championships, collectively. W&J has had 11 individual NCAA Champions, with their most recent coming in 2015 when Nick Carr won the 157-pound title at the 2015 NCAA Division III Wrestling Championships. More than 80 students have been selected as conference Most Valuable Players/Players of the Year, more than 450 students have been named First Team All-Conference, over 90 received students have received All-American honors, and W&J has had 79 Academic All-Americans by CSC (Formerly known as CoSIDA). The W&J football team has won a conference best 29 PAC Championships and has advanced to the NCAA Division III playoffs 28 times, including two trips to the NCAA Division III National Championship Game in 1992 and 1994.

== History ==
=== Early development ===
The development of sanctioned, varsity-level athletics at Washington & Jefferson College began to develop in 1883, when the student body began agitating for more formal athletic programs. Many other schools had developed athletic programs by that time and advocates felt that a more formal athletic program would increase school spirit, which they felt was lacking. In 1890, students formed the Athletic Association, charging the 75 members a $1 membership fee that went to fund athletics. By a vote, the students selected cardinal and black to be the school colors, as the preferred scheme of navy and orange had been taken by the Western University of Pennsylvania. An oil strike was discovered on the Old Fairgrounds, which helped finance the renovation of that facility into the "College Field," including the construction of a new grandstand.

At the close of the 19th century, the concerns over the influence of professionalism in college sports, especially the use of itinerant student and professional football player John Brallier, caused the faculty to adopt the first eligibility requirements for student athletes. Professor Edward Linton represented W&J at the initial meeting of the International Athletic Association of the United States in 1906, where the first national standards for edibility and amateurism were developed. At that meeting, Linton expressed a desire for the student athlete to be "relieved of the incubus of the professional coach."

=== Student and Faculty Athletic Committees ===
By the early 1900s, "football fever" had swept through the student body, leading the College administration to take steps to further integrate the sport into the educational framework, including the development of a new governance structure. The new Student Athletic Committee and Faculty Athletic Committees instituted a minimum 1-year residency requirement to combat transient students and created an alumni coach system, so the coaches would be more sympathetic to the educational objectives of the college. In 1910, the football program was in danger of being dissolved due to crushing debt. The Student Athletic Committee proposed a $1 per term student fee to fund the team, a proposal that was met with initial resistance from the student body. However, team manager and beloved student solicitor Robert M. Murphy, was able to convince the students to accept the fee. The Student Athletic Committee agreed to retract the residency rule, as it was blamed for contributing to losses, but instituted other student athlete requirements, including a ban on Academy students, raising entrance requirements, and creating a stringent system of recording absences. However, the Faculty Athletic Committee balked, vetoing the new rules.

The firings of Dr. G.H. Winchester and Dr. H.E. Wells highlighted the growing tension between athletics and academics. As orchestrated by a group of alumni football supporters, the two professors were brought before a faculty committee for not having the requisite support for the athletic programs. At the time, Dr. Winchester was serving in France during World War I and Wells maintained during the hearing that he did not object to athletics per se, but rather the way it was run at Washington & Jefferson. The event, known nationally as the Winchester-Wells case, was investigated by the American Association of University Professors and was the profiled in Upton Sinclair's book The Goose-Step, a muckraking investigation into the state of American colleges.

=== Athletic Council and financial reforms ===
During the Presidency of Simon Strousse Baker, the Student and Faculty Athletic Committees were heavily in debt and approaching insolvency. The gate receipts for football games, the Committees' main source of income, had fallen as the team began to lag behind the larger schools it traditionally played. A report in 1929 by the Carnegie Foundation for the Advancement of Teaching showed that the W&J athletics program, like many programs at other colleges, held a large "slush fund" with donations from alumni and businessmen totaling $25,000 to $50,000 per year. This "extreme case of subsidizing" funded all college expenses for football players, plus "paychecks" to top performers. To alleviate this problem, President Baker proposed to wholly separate athletic funds from general College funds by creating an "Athletic Council" to take control of the athletic program. The proposal was defeated, and Baker was eventually hounded from office. In spite of that failure, a 1931 followup to the original Carnegie Foundation report commended W&J for creating some institutional controls, including limiting subsidization to tuition, room, and board.

Baker's successor, Ralph Cooper Hutchison, himself more personally popular than Baker, was able to bring even more control to the athletic program by reducing the number of scholarships from 18 to 8 and limiting the practice of playing against powerhouse football teams. Later, the athletic program was reorganized under an Athletic Director and the practice of awarding athletic scholarships was abolished. In 1937, Hutchison created a whole new governing structure for athletics, the Athletic Council, which was not unlike the plan proposed by Baker a decade earlier. The new Athletic Council, composed of four faculty members and six students, had responsibility for dispensing student appropriations and income from ticket sales. The Board of Trustees' own Athletic Committee would govern the hiring and payment of coaches. The new system was intended to unite the intramural and intercollegiate athletics programs, reinstate faculty into athletic governance, give more responsibility to students, and to create a freshman football program. D.C. Morrow, former football coach and member of the Athletic Committee dissented, advocating for a return to the scholarship model, blaming the waning alumni interest in the college on the team's poor performance. However, the College's indebtedness at that time was $133,000, most of which was the result of player subsidization. At that time, athletics took up half of the student activity fee. In an attempt to stabilize the fiscal picture, the athletic budget was cut significantly, with freshman football and boxing discontinued. The plan worked, and by the 1940s, the athletic finances were stabilized. This signaled the end of the football team's games against larger schools.

== Athletic colors and nicknames ==
In 1890, a vote by the Athletic Association selected cardinal and black to be the school colors; the preferred scheme of orange and navy has been taken by Western University of Pennsylvania. Since then, the phrase "Red and Black" has been used to refer to the school itself, the college newspaper (Red & Black) and the athletic teams. The early athletic teams also were known as the "Jaymen," a play on the college's nickname "W&J". By the 1930s, the word "Jaymen" was used to refer to the students in general. The use of this term had died off even before the college went co-educational in 1970. The college's modern nickname of "Presidents" was coined in 1917 by a sportswriter from Richmond, Virginia covering the football game between W&J and the Washington & Lee Generals. Larry Stewart, the W&J's football publicity director at the time, quickly adopted the nickname on a permanent basis. In July 2016, the school introduced a new brand identity, working with New York City-based SME Branding.

== Sports sponsored ==
=== Baseball ===
W&J varsity programs
| Men's sports | Women's sports |
|---|---|
| Baseball | Basketball |
| Basketball | Cross country |
| Cross country | Field hockey |
| Football | Golf |
| Golf | Lacrosse |
| Lacrosse | Soccer |
| Soccer | Softball |
| Swimming and diving | Swimming and diving |
| Tennis | Tennis |
| Track and field | Track and field |
| Volleyball (Note: Since the 2026–27 season.) | Volleyball |
| Water polo | Water polo |
| Wrestling | Wrestling |

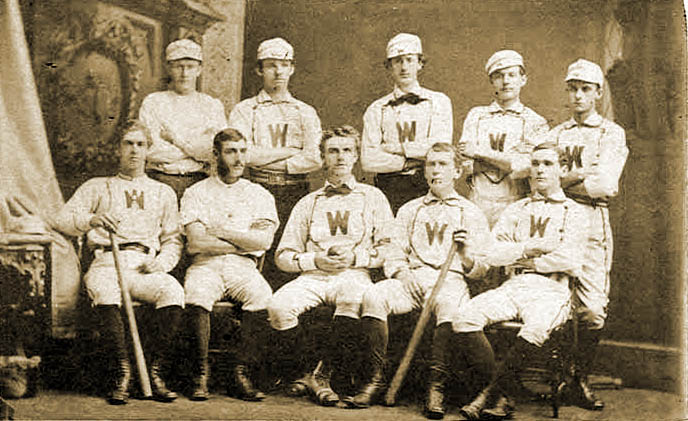
W&J baseball team of 1870

The baseball team was founded in 1890. At least five W&J alumni have played professional baseball: Ody Abbott, Farmer Burns, Doc Gessler, Andy Oyler, and Bill Steen.

W&J's baseball team plays at the all-turf Ross Memorial Ballpark, a site selected to host the 2015, 2016, 2017 and 2026 NCAA D-III regional tournament. Tyler Horvat, one of the top all-around players in program history, is the school's all-time winningest pitcher with 29 victories. Nick Vento (2014–17) is the all-time home run leader with 26 career home runs. Vento is also the school's all-time hit (255) and RBI (168) leader. Luke Alvarez, a recent graduate, shattered the single-season home run record, slugging 16 homers in 2026.

In 2017, the W&J baseball team made history as they won the 2017 NCAA Mideast Regional tournament to advance to their first Division III College World Series in school history. The team earned the Presidents Athletic Conference's automatic bid after winning the 2017 PAC regular season and tournament championships. In regional play, the Presidents won their first 3 games earning their first spot in a regional championship game in school history. W&J lost game 1 to SUNY Cortland 7–6, but bounced back to win 6–3 in game two to advance to the 2017 Division III World Series. The Presidents maintained this momentum in Appleton, Wisconsin as they would win their first 3 games to win Pool A and advance to the best-of-3 championship series against California Lutheran. W&J would win game one 12-2 behind a complete game effort from pitcher Matt Heslin. The Presidents would lose the next two games and finish as the national runner-up with a Division-III-best 42 wins and 13 losses, also a new W&J school record.

During the 2019 season, W&J would advance to the Division III College World Series for the second time in three seasons. W&J compiled a 38–13 record with a 24–3 mark against conference competition. W&J's postseason run started with its 12th PAC title, as the team defeated Bethany 8–1 on May 11. The Presidents outscored the opposition by a 27–5 score as it cruised to three straight wins in the PAC Tournament.

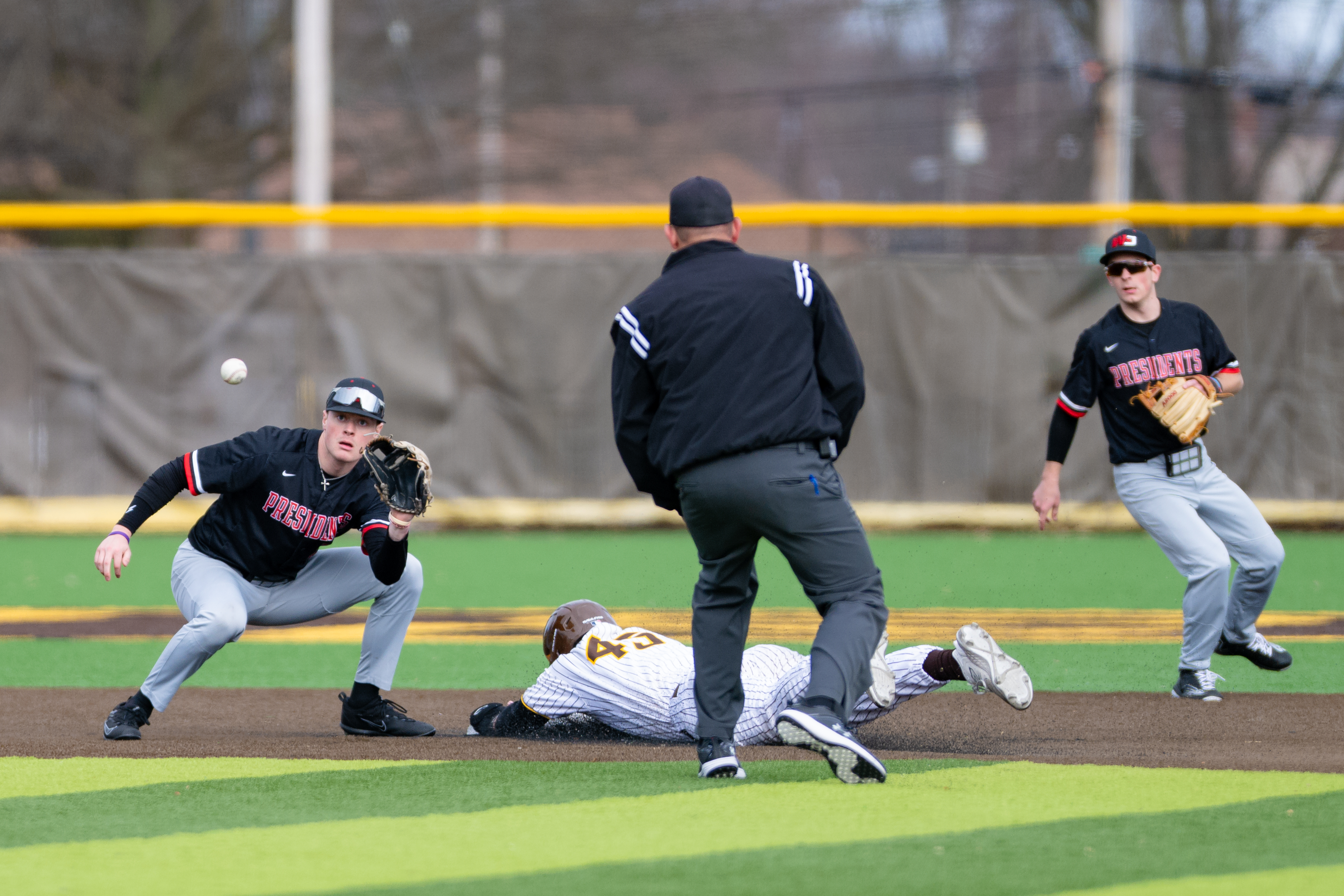
A game between the Presidents and the Baldwin Wallace Yellow Jackets in 2024

W&J would continue their run the next weekend, as the Presidents traveled to Salisbury University. The Presidents opened the NCAA Division III Regional with a 4–1 win over the host Sea Gulls, who entered the tournament ranked 10th in the country. W&J followed with a pair of wins over #11 Rowan University to capture the NCAA Salisbury Regional on May 19 and advance to the NCAA Super Regional round. The following weekend, W&J would travel to Misericordia University for a best of three series with the Cougars. W&J earned a sweep of the series, winning game one by an 8–3 score before claiming game two by a 5-4 margin. The 8–0 start to the postseason would help W&J punch its ticket to the Division III World Series in Cedar Rapids, Iowa. W&J would go 1–2 at the World Series, with both losses coming against eventual national champion Chapman University from California. Junior pitcher Ben Marsico was named PAC Pitcher of the Year, as the righty compiled an 11–2 record.

In its history, W&J has had 13 student-athletes earn All-America honors: Shaun Pfeil (2005), Sam Mann (2007), Eddie Nogay (2013), Riley Groves (2017), Nick Vento (2017), Derek Helbing (2017), Mullen Socha (2019), Henry Litman (2022), Tyler Horvat (2023), Dante DiMatteo (2025), Josh Dezenzo (2026), Luke Alvarez (2026) and Brendan Cruz.

A 12-time Presidents' Athletic Conference Baseball Coach of the Year and two-time ABCA Mideast Regional Coach of the Year, Jeff Mountain has led the Presidents for 24 seasons. Mountain has compiled a 698-335-2 record during his tenure with the Presidents. He is the school's all-time winningest coach in all sports. (Last Updated June 2026).

=== Men's basketball ===
The men's basketball team was founded in 1913. In the 1930s and 1940s, the team played at Washington High School and regularly beat teams like West Virginia University, Penn State, Navy, Carnegie Tech, and Villanova.

The team received an invitation to the 1943 National Invitation Tournament, where, as the 8th seed, they defeated the top seed Creighton University at Madison Square Garden by a score of 43–42. After losing to Toledo in the semi-final round, W&J defeated Fordham 39–34 to take the third place in the tournament.

Three W&J alumni went on to professional basketball careers, including Hal Tidrick, Harry Zeller, and Buddy Jeannette. Jeanette was elected to the Basketball Hall of Fame in 1994.

=== Football ===
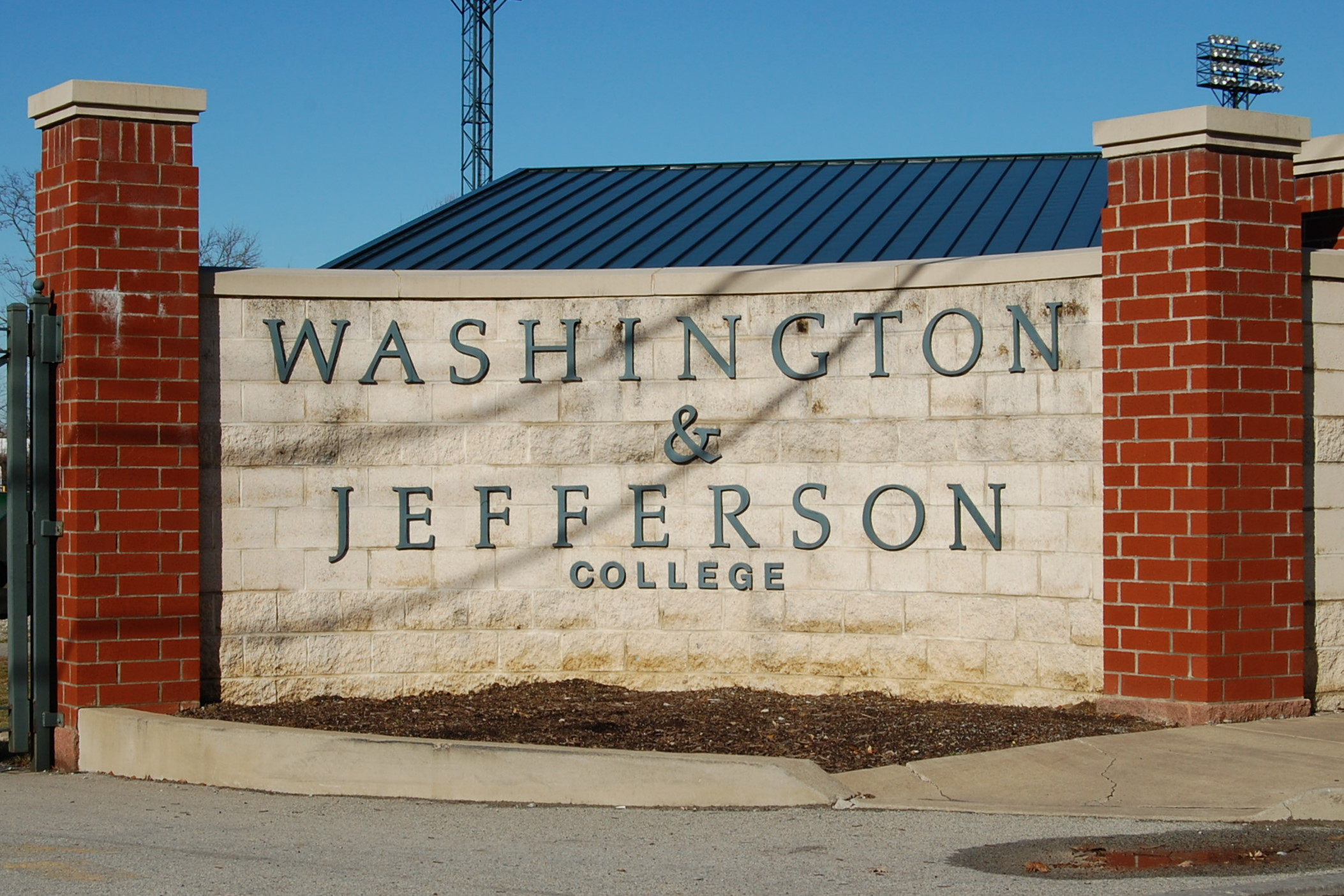
Cameron Stadium, home of the football team since 1890

The football team competes in the NCAA Division III and is affiliated with the Presidents' Athletic Conference (PAC). Since its founding in 1890, the team has played their home games at Cameron Stadium. A number of players were named to the College Football All-America Team, and two players, Pete Henry and Edgar Garbisch have been elected to the College Football Hall of Fame. Several other former players have gone on to play professionally, including "Deacon" Dan Towler, Russ Stein, and Pete Henry, who was also elected to the Pro Football Hall of Fame and the NFL 1920s All-Decade Team. The team has been coached by some of the greatest coaches in football history, including John Heisman, Greasy Neale, and Bob Folwell.

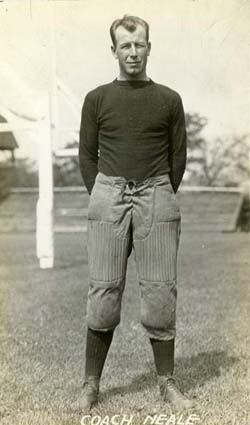
Greasy Neale, football coach in 1922

The team was founded in 1890, quickly becoming well known for drawing large crowds and defeating a number of prominent football teams. The faculty and administration expressed concern over the strength of the team and made efforts to reduce the influence of professionalism on the players. During the 1910s, some sportswriters were suggesting that the Presidents were one of the top teams in the nation. The biggest achievement in the team's history came in 1921, when the Presidents were chosen to play in 1922 Rose Bowl, playing the heavily favored California Golden Bears to a scoreless tie. The Red and Black finished the season with a share of the 1921 national championship, as named by the Boand System. As college football developed in the 1930s and 1940s, the Presidents fell far behind their larger competitors, who were able to offer scholarships for their players. Controversy over the poor play of the football team, and a lack of play against larger teams, contributed to the resignation of a college president. By the 1950s, the team joined the NCAA Division III and the Presidents' Athletic Conference. By the 1980s, the team had learned to thrive in that environment, winning a number of conference championships and regularly qualifying for the NCAA Division III playoffs. W&J finished as the nation's runner-up in both 1992 and 1994. Under current head coach Mike Sirianni's direction, the team has advanced to the NCAA Division III Quarterfinals twice (2004 and 2008). The program won its conference record 26th PAC title in 2018. Sirianni guided W&J to a 20-17 road victory over Ithaca in the 2019 ECAC Asa S. Bushnell Bowl. The victory improved W&J 4-0 in bowl games.

Mike Sirianni (Mount Union '94), one of NCAA football's most successful head coaches and the winningest football coach in W&J history, served his 23rd season as the head coach at Washington & Jefferson College in 2025.

Sirianni's winning percentage of .805 (202-49) places him among the best active NCAA football coaches (FBS, FCS, D-II, or D-III) with at least 10 years of experience. At the conclusion of the 2025 season, Sirianni ranks seventh in winning percentage among active head coaches across all divisions with 10+ years of experience. Among that group, he ranks fourth best among all Division III coaches.

An eight-time Presidents' Athletic Conference Coach of the Year, the 2012 D3football.com South Region Coach of the Year and the 2017 American Football Coaches Association (AFCA) Region 2 Coach of the Year, Sirianni has led W&J to the postseason in 20 of his 23 seasons, including 13 NCAA playoff appearances. Sirianni's squads have won at least nine games 15 times, including three-straight, 10-plus win seasons from 2006-08.

=== Men's ice hockey ===
Ice hockey unofficial logo

The men's hockey team was founded in 1998 as a member of the Western Pennsylvania Collegiate Hockey League (WPCHL). In 2001, the team joined the Eastern Collegiate Hockey League. That year, the team won the Milan Mountaineer Invitational Hockey Tournament at West Virginia University. The club currently competes in the College Hockey Mid America Conference, a Division I regional league of the American Collegiate Hockey Association The club made appearances in the ACHA National Tournament in 2004, 2005, and 2007. The team plays at the IceoPlex at Southpointe. The club plays home games at the Iceoplex at Southpointe, the practice facility for the Pittsburgh Penguins.

The team defeated West Virginia University by the score of 5–3 at the Ice Zone in Boardman, OH to win the 2008 College Hockey Mid America Conference championship, avenging a loss to Duquesne University in the finals in 2007. Senior Craig Frey was named the 2008 CHMA Tournament MVP.

W&J won back to back Eastern Collegiate Hockey League (ECHL) titles, including a double overtime victory over Niagara University in 2003. In 2000–2001, Washington & Jefferson won the WPCHA Championship as Brian Grinnik was named the Jack McKinnon MVP. The program has had three ACHA Division I All-Stars: Mario Panucci (2008, 2009), Ryne Savisky (2010), Dave Crockett (2011).

The team's current head coach is Lou Biancaniello, assistant coach Brian Pajack, and goaltending coach Sean Moloney. The team was previously coached by Jim Driscoll and Dean Ferarri. Prior to Driscoll, the team was coached by John Harford, USA Hockey since 1967 with 40 years of hockey experience. Harford coached the Presidents during the 2007-2008 and 2008–2009 seasons. Former Pittsburgh Penguins defenseman and two-time Stanley Cup champion Peter Taglianetti preceded Harford as head coach. Taglianetti coached the Presidents during the 2005-2006 and 2006–2007 seasons, helping lead the Presidents to the 2007 CHMA regular season championship and to the 2007 ACHA Division I National Tournament. Prior to Taglianetti, W&J was coached by Dave Hornack who led the Presidents to ACHA National Tournaments in 2004 and 2005.

=== Rugby ===
The Washington and Jefferson Rugby Club was founded in 2004, and fields both men's and women's teams. It is a member of USA Rugby, the Midwest Rugby Union, and the Allegheny Rugby Union. The club competes in the Allegheny Rugby Union Collegiate Division 3 against teams such as Juniata Rugby Football Club, Carnegie Mellon Rugby Football Club and Geneva Rugby Football Club. The club also competes in an unofficial Presidents' Athletic Conference Championship every spring. In 2004, the men's club won the 2004 Allegheny Rugby Union Division 3 championship. They are now one of the most successful teams at Washington and Jefferson College. Under a newly appointed head coach, so far in 2011, the club is a perfect 8–0. Winning the 2011 Pittsburgh Collegiate Classic and the 2011 Westmoreland Collegiate Tournament.

=== Women's soccer ===
The women's soccer team is led by Head Coach Dan Dubois. The team has won three straight PAC Conference Championships in the 2008, 2009 and 2010 seasons under former Head coach Pete Curtis. The following year, the defense set an all-time low number of goals allowed during a season, letting by just 13 goals for the 19 game 2011 season.

=== Track and field ===
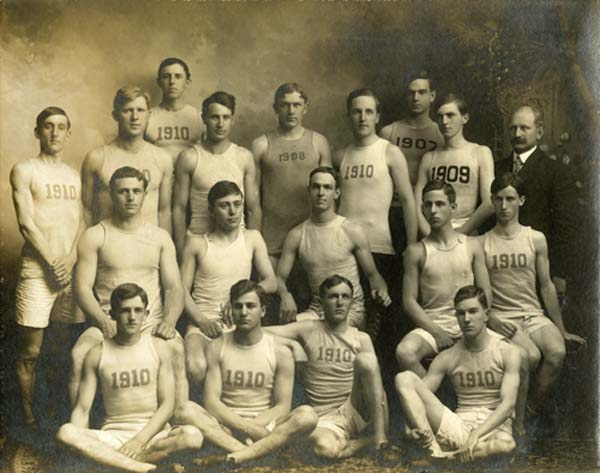
Track team of 1907

W&J has a combined five track & field championships in program history. The women's team secured outdoor titles in 2006, 2007 and 2011. The men's program has an outdoor title in 2010 and claimed an indoor title in 2023.

W&J has found its most success during the NCAA outdoor championship events. A total of 10 All-America laurels have been secured in outdoor competition. Senior Michelle Wuenstel and junior C. J. Corcoran became just the second duo from W&J to compete at the NCAA Track & Field Championships in the same season in 2011. Wuenstel became the first Presidents’ outdoor track athlete to earn All-American honors after placing fourth in the 400-meter event. Corcoran competed for the national javelin championship, finishing 16th.

Claire Anderson '26 secured a pair of First Team All-America honors at the 2026 NCAA Outdoor Championships at Wisconsin La Crosse. Anderson finished third in the 10,000 Meters and sixth in the 5,000 Meters during an historic effort. Anderson became the first Presidents' distance runner to secure multiple All-America honors at the same track championship.

== Other sports ==
The cross country team was founded in 1956. The golf team was founded in 1923. The rifle team was founded in 1952. The soccer team was founded in 1970. The swimming team was founded in 1930. The tennis team was founded in 1916. The track team was founded in 1925. The field hockey team was founded in 1975. The women's basketball team was founded in 1976. The Women's swimming team was founded in 1978. The men's wrestling team was founded in 1932. The women's volleyball team was founded in 1974 Women's lacrosse was added in 2007–08. Two new varsity sports will be added in 2026–27—men's volleyball and women's wrestling.

Having qualified for national championship events four times in his career, Harley Moyer saved his best for his last season, winning the 2018 NCAA Division III Mideast Cross Country Regional in a field of 356 competitors. He followed that performance up a week later with a 13th-place finish at the national championship meet, cementing his status as the first male cross country All-American in W&J history.

As an athletic program, W&J won five conference titles during the 2018–19 academic year: football, men's cross country, field hockey, baseball and men's golf. Despite having the 2019–20 academic year cut short due to COVID-19, W&J added four PAC team titles, including their first PAC title in women's tennis. The W&J wrestling team earned its first conference team crown since 1999 when they captured the 2020 title at the Salvitti Family Gymnasium.

=== Boxing ===
W&J had a boxing team from 1931 to 1937, when it was canceled due to a financial crisis. Al Demedowitz won the 1932 Eastern Intercollegiate Boxing Championship in the 165-pound weight class. Nicholas P. Dallis, who would later earn notoriety as a comic strip writer, won the same title in 1933.

== Athletic facilities ==
The first athletic facility at Washington & Jefferson was the Old Gym. College Field was purchased in 1885. Originally a fairground, it was developed into a proper athletic field after the discovery of oil on the grounds. It was renovated in 1999 and rechristened Cameron Stadium after the addition of an all-weather track, the installation of a FieldTurf football field, and renovated grandstands and media facilities. In 1970, the Henry Memorial Center was built. The venue was renovated in 2019 and renamed the Salvitti Family Gymnasium. It houses a main gymnasium for basketball, wrestling, and volleyball, a wrestling practice room, a weight room and the Eaton Fitness Center. The natatorium, a six-lane, 25-yard pool, with depths ranging four to seven feet deep, hosts the men's and women's swimming and diving teams as well as the men's and women's water polo squads. The W&J tennis teams compete at Janet L. Swanson Tennis Center, which was completed in 2017. The softball team plays at Brooks Park, which was extensively renovated in 2004.

The Ross Memorial Park and Alexandre Stadium is combined multi-purpose outdoor athletic facility for the baseball, soccer and lacrosse teams. At 233,000 square feet (21,600 m^{2}) of Field Turf playing surface, the facility was the home of the largest continuous artificial playing surface in the world at its completion in 2004.

As part of extensive renovations in the Henry Memorial Center, the Eaton Fitness Center opened in the fall of 2019. Ross Memorial Park hosted the NCAA Division III Mideast Regional Baseball Championship in four times (2015, 2016, 2017 and 2026).

== Sources ==
- E. Lee, North (1991). Battling the Indians, Panthers, and Nittany Lions: The Story of Washington & Jefferson College's First Century of Football, 1890-1990. Daring Books. ISBN 978-1-878302-03-8.
- Scarborough, David Knowles (1979). "Intercollegiate Athletics at Washington and Jefferson College: the Building of a Tradition". Ph.D Dissertation. Pittsburgh, Pennsylvania: University of Pittsburgh.
