= Cameron Coca-Cola =

Coca-Cola Bottling company in Pennsylvania, US

Cameron Coca-Cola Bottling Co.
- Industry: Beverage bottling
- Founded: 1889
- Fate: Purchased by Coca-Cola Enterprises in 1998
- Successor: Cameron Family Glass Packaging LLC
- Headquarters: Washington, Pennsylvania
- Area served: Western Pennsylvania, West Virginia, Ohio
- Owner: The Cameron Family

Cameron Coca-Cola Bottling Co. was a large Coca-Cola bottling company in Washington, Pennsylvania.

== History ==
Cameron Flavoring was founded in 1889, and began a relationship with Coca-Cola in the early 1900s. The company had plants in Washington, Pennsylvania, Houston, Pennsylvania, Wheeling, West Virginia, and Canton, Ohio. The company operated by purchasing the syrup from Coca-Cola, mixing it, and distributing it to the surrounding areas.

=== Modern developments ===
The company's facilities were converted to natural gas in 1996 with a $124,000 grant by the Pennsylvania Department of Environmental Protection. The company had a number of deals with local school districts where they paid thousands of dollars for exclusive rights to sell Coke on school premises. The deal with Hampton Township School District paid the district $40,000 over seven years. The deal with Upper St. Clair School District paid the district $50,000 over five years. In the deal with Quaker Valley School District, the company agreed to buy several new scoreboards in exchange for the right to have their logo on the scoreboard and for exclusive rights to sell Coke on school premises. There was another exclusive deal with Woodland Hills School District. Cameron Coca-Cola was 10th largest Coke bottler and the second longest family-run Coke bottler in the nation by the late 1990s.

=== Purchase by Coca Cola Enterprises ===
Cameron Coca-Cola Bottling was purchased by Coca-Cola Enterprises in 1998. Coinciding with the purchase of five other Coke bottlers, the deal was part of a play by Coca-Cola Enterprises to consolidate their distribution chain amid the Cola Wars against Pepsi. All told, the six deals cost Coca-Cola Enterprises $770 million in stock, cash, debt, and assumed debt. Wilfred Cameron, the family patriarch, died in 1999.

The Cameron operation moved to Kalama, Washington in 2008 and was renamed the "Cameron Family Glass Packaging", to produce bottles for the wine industry in the Western United States. The 175,000-square-foot (16,300 m^{2}) facility, which cost $109M to build, became the first new glass plant built in the nation in over 30 years to exclusively produce wine bottles. It became the largest such plant to be operated on an "eco-friendly" basis, with an electric furnace using hydroelectricity generated by the Columbia River. The plant provided wine bottles for a number of Washington wines, but had to file for Chapter 7 bankruptcy in 2009, due to a furnace failure that caused $12M in damages within a month of startup. Production was later resumed under new ownership following a court-ordered sale in 2010.

== Philanthropy ==
Cameron Coca-Cola sponsored championship harness racing at The Meadows Racetrack and Casino. The company was also a namesake sponsor of the Pittsburgh-Allegheny County Fair.

The Cameron family have been closely connected to Washington & Jefferson College in Washington, Pennsylvania for several decades, with a number of them attending the college, and three members serving on the board of trustees. One such trustee, Winnie Cameron, was awarded the Alumni Distinguished Service Award and an honorary degree. The family donated $2.65 million to the college in 1999, one of the top five largest donations in the college history, to redesign and expand College Field, which was renamed Cameron Stadium. They also funded the digital scoreboard at Henry Memorial Center and Ross Memorial Park and Alexandre Stadium. The family was awarded the Robert M. Murphy Award and inducted into the W&J Athletic Hall of Fame in 2006.
