= Combat Stress Intervention Program =

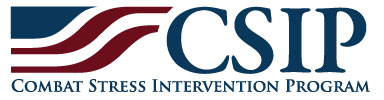
- Abbreviation: CSIP
- Formation: 2008
- Location: Washington & Jefferson College
- Principal Investigator: Michael Crabtree, Ph.D.
- Co-Principal Investigator: Elizabeth Bennett, Ph.D.
- Affiliations: United States Department of Defense
- Website: www.copingaftercombat.com

The Combat Stress Intervention Program (CSIP) is a 3-year United States Department of Defense-funded research program to study mental health issues experienced by veterans returning from Operation Iraqi Freedom and Operation Enduring Freedom. The $1.5 million study, which is managed under the Military Operational Medicine Research Program, focuses on Combat Stress Disorder, Posttraumatic stress disorder, and other post-deployment transitional challenges. The study also focuses on developing resources and solutions for such veterans.

The study is being conducted by faculty from Washington & Jefferson College. Michael Crabtree, Ph.D. serves as Principal Investigator and Elizabeth Bennett Ph.D. serves as Co-Principal Investigator. Research partners include staff from Clemson University, Conemaugh Health System, and Highlands Hospital. John Dowling, a lieutenant colonel in the Army Reserve, is the project's military liaison. Washington & Jefferson College's Dieter-Porter Life Science Building serves as the project's headquarters.

The project will develop strategies to use community providers and veterans' families to help, as many veterans are reluctant to use the United States Department of Veterans Affairs for fear of being stigmatized. Strategies for training National Guard unit commanders, based in part on the practices of the Israeli army, in mental health support will be developed.

The project began in 2008, with the first phase including an anonymous survey of 1,500 National Guard and Reserve members from Southwestern Pennsylvania to determine the veterans' needs.

Outreach to the community included in participation in Veterans Day events at Conemaugh Memorial Medical Center in Johnstown, Pennsylvania. Other events included hosting Donald Meichenbaum, an expert in the treatment of post-traumatic stress disorder from University of Waterloo.

As of February 2010, CSIP had surveyed more than 750 veterans; while 43 percent acknowledging stress, emotional, alcohol, drug or family problems, while only 11.6% of that group expressed openness to receiving help.

A chapter on "Unique Challenges Faced by the National Guard and Reserve" produced by the Combat Stress Intervention Program was included in the 2013 Military Psychologists' Desk Reference.
