= Gertrude Strohm =

American author, compiler, and game designer

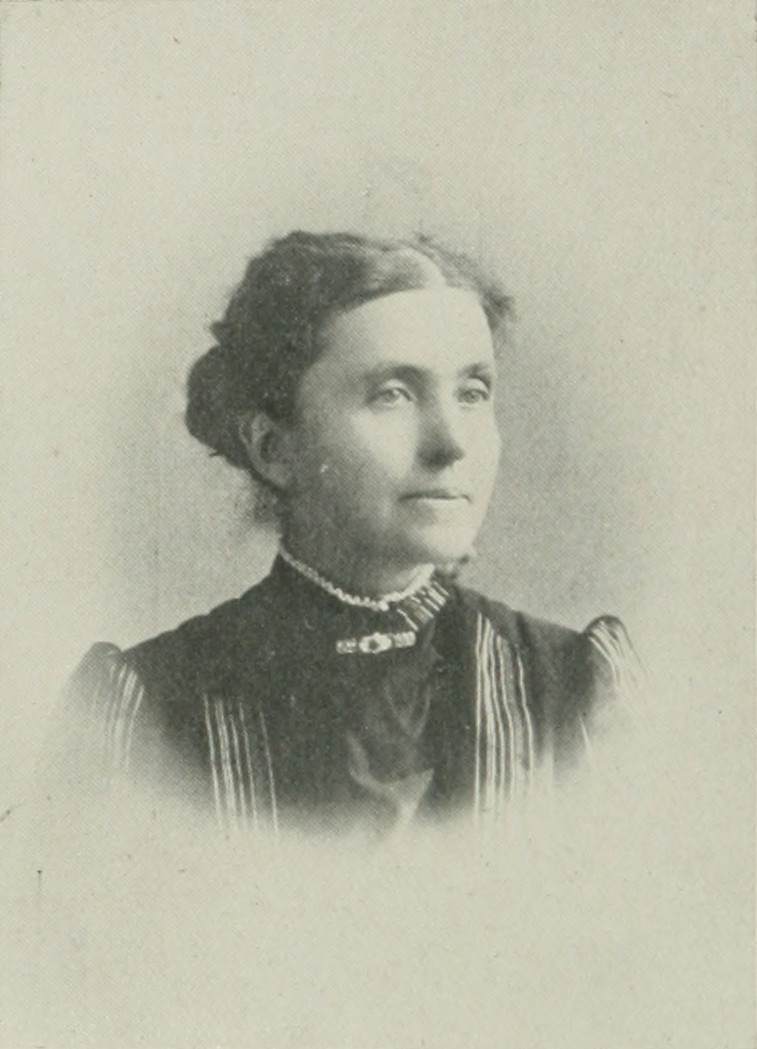
- "A Woman of the Century"
- Born: July 14, 1843; Greene County, Ohio, U.S.
- Died: November 4, 1927 (aged 84); Miami Valley Hospital, Dayton, Ohio, U.S.
- Resting place: Woodland Cemetery and Arboretum, Dayton, Ohio
- Education: Washington Female Seminary
- Occupations: author; compiler; game designer
- Parents: Isaac Strohm; Elizabeth Ainsworth Strohm
- Writing career
- Language: English

Gertrude Strohm (July 14, 1843 – November 4, 1927) was an American author, compiler, and game designer of Dayton, Ohio. Between 1875 and 1892, she engaged in various types of compilations including cookbooks, social fireside games, and calendars. Strohm also contributed to magazines. She died in 1927.

== Background and education ==
Gertrude Strohm was born in Greene County, Ohio, July 14, 1843, and always lived in a country home 8 miles (13 km) from Dayton, Ohio. She was the oldest of four children. Her paternal grandparents were Henry Strohm, born in Hesse Darmstadt, and Mary Le Fevre, a descendant of the Huguenots. Her mother, Margaret Guthrie, was the daughter of James Guthrie, who went from the Eastern U.S. to Greene County in the early part of the 19th-century. Her mother was Elizabeth Ainsworth, whose first husband was Hugh Andrews. Gertrude's father, Isaac Strohm, was engaged nearly all his life in Government service in Washington, D.C., first in the Treasury Department, then for sixteen years the chief enrolling and engrossing clerk in the Congress, and latterly in the War Department. He wrote much for the press. When a young man, he was a contributor to Horace Greeley's New Yorker, and wrote poems and sketches for Sartain's Magazine, the Southern Literary Messenger, and other periodicals. Gertrude's siblings included Elizabeth, Mary, Harry, and Edwin.

Strohm was educated at home and at Girls' Seminary, Washington, D.C., but her studies were interrupted by ill health.

== Career ==
Stroh engaged in various types of compilations. She also made many reward cards and Sunday school concert exercises.

=== Game designer ===
Her first publication was a social game she made and arranged, entitled, "Popping the Question". It was published in Boston and afterward sold to a New York firm, who republished it, and it was again brought out in an attractive edition for the holiday trade of 1891. She made three games for a Springfield, Massachusetts, firm, the last called "Novel Fortune Telling", composed wholly of titles of novels.

=== Author ===
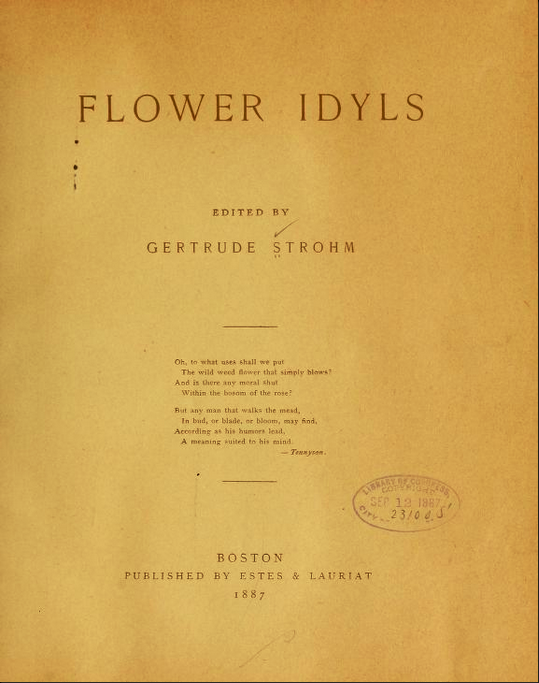
Flower idyls (1887)

Flower Idyls (1871), edited by Strohm, was an adaptation of many flowers to people and their occupations, suggested by poems of well-known writers. It was illustrated by photo-etchings of the different flowers, printed in the colors of the original, and bound in a jacqueminot vellum.

The Universal Cookery Book (New York : White, Stokes Allen. Detroit: Phillips & Hunt; 1887) was largely a selection of the best receipts from standard authorities already approved by the public. Strohm's compilation contained practical recipes for household use from the most eminent authorities, including Marion Harland, Miss Parloa, Mrs. Washington, Thomas J. Murrey, Miss Carson, and others. Containing some 250 pages, it covered the field from soup to confectionery, with an additional chapter on "herb tea" and other "home remedies". Several blank pages were also included whereon a person could inscribe additional recipes. (New York : White, Stokes Allen. Detroit: Phillips & Hunt.) Lippincott's Monthly Magazine stated that it "... showed patience and industry on the part of the compiler, and praiseworthy courtesy on the part of the authors who have allowed her to lay their works under contribution".

Another compilation, The Young Scholar's Calendar (1891), included Scripture texts for daily living. Other book compilations included, Word Pictures (Boston, 1875), The universal common sense cookery book (1892). Scripture Exercises for Sunday Schools, and Social Games for Home Amusement. Strohm was also a contributor to magazines.

== Later life ==
Unmarried, Strohm made her home in Dayton.

In 1923, she had for sale a number of gourds -fine specimens and in various sizes- including, Dipper, Hercules, Club, Bottle, Spoon, Eggs, Peas, Apple, Onion, and others. Giving her address as Miami Valley Hospital, Dayton, Ohio, she advertised that she would sell them as a whole, not individually.

Gertrude Strohm died at Miami Valley Hospital, Dayton, Ohio, November 4, 1927. Interment was at Woodland Cemetery and Arboretum, Dayton.

== Selected works ==
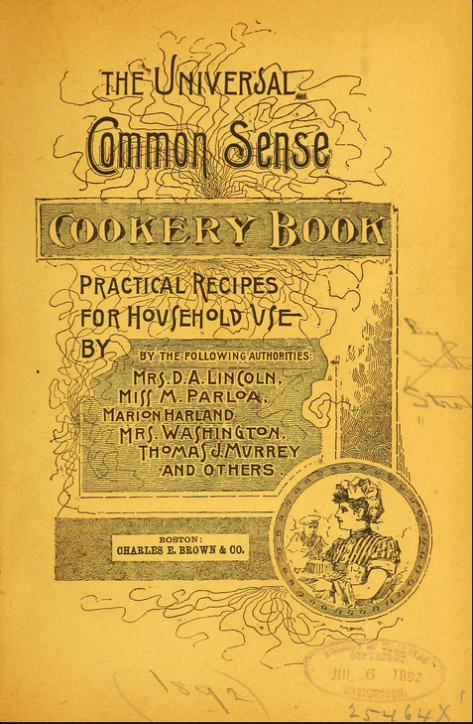
The universal common sense cookery book, 1892

=== Books ===
- Word Pictures (1875)
- Flower Idyls (1871)
- Universal Cookery Book (1887)
- The Young Scholar's Calendar (1891)
- The universal common sense cookery book (1892)

=== Games ===
- "Popping the Question"
- "Novel Fortune Telling"
