= Washington Female Seminary =

Women's school in Washington, Pennsylvania (1836–1948)

Coordinates: 40.16856°N 80.24066°W

- Type: Female seminary
- Active: 1836–1948
- Location: Washington, Pennsylvania, USA

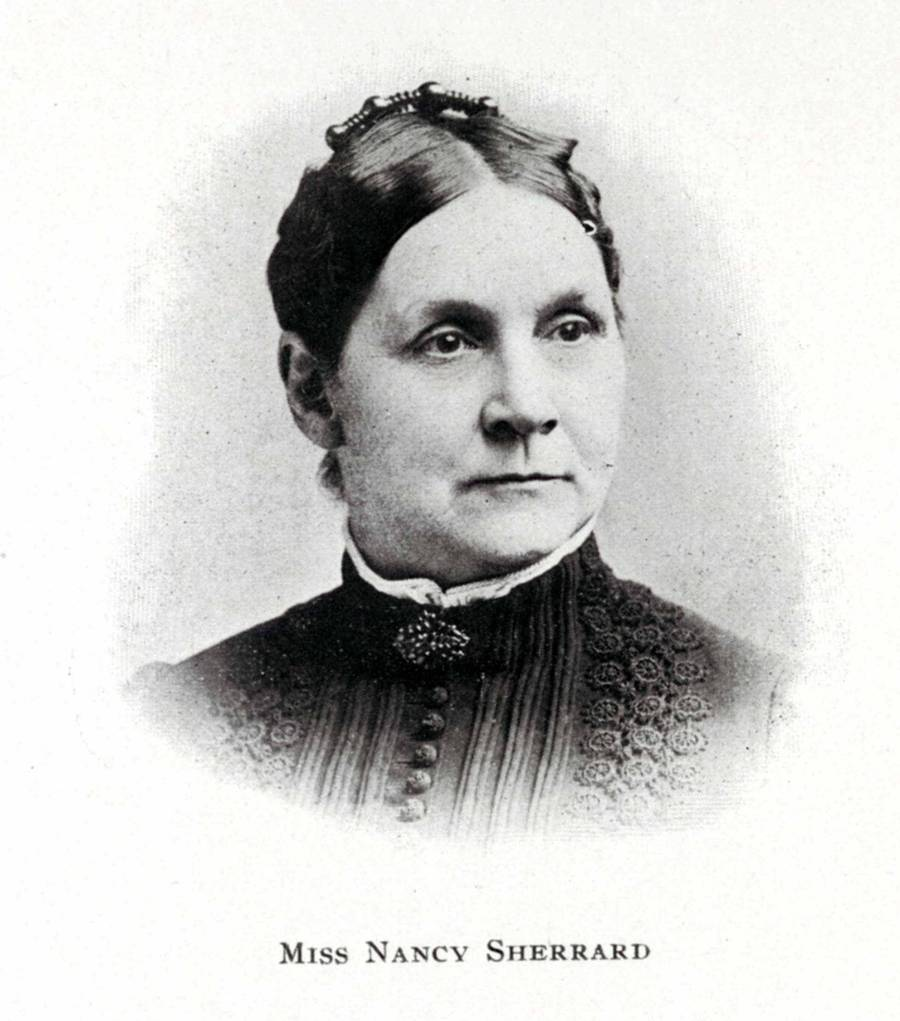
Nancy Sherrard, principal

The Washington Female Seminary was a Presbyterian seminary for women operating from 1836 to 1948 in Washington, Pennsylvania. During the 19th century, it was "one of the best known and most noted institutions of its kind in the state".

== History ==
The Washington Female Seminary was part of a larger Female seminary movement. Creation of this particular institution began in 1835 and the Seminary opened in 1836. The two founders were abolitionist Francis Julius LeMoyne and Alexander Reed.

It was formally chartered by the legislature in 1839. The first principal was Mrs. Francis Biddle of Philadelphia, who left in 1840. Sarah B. Hanna (a student of Emma Willard) was Principal from 1840-1874. Miss Nancy Sherrard followed as Principal.

By 1886, attendance hovered around 100 to 150 students. The curriculum included both a preparatory course, which generally gained admission to the finest women's colleges, and a regular course, with studies in music, art, and elocution. It was one of the few schools that taught the Bible from a literary point of view.

Rebecca Harding Davis, who graduated in 1848, is its most famous graduate. In April 2013, a historical marker in Davis' honor was placed near Swanson Science Center, the site of the former McIlvaine Hall/Washington Female Seminary. The effort to place the marker there was led by Washington & Jefferson College English professor, Dr. Jennifer Harding.

John Leighton Stewart served as a trustee.

After the Seminary closed, its building was purchased by Washington & Jefferson College and renamed McIlvaine Hall.

== Notable alumni ==
- Rebecca Harding Davis (1831–1910), author and journalist
- Lide Smith Meriwether (1829–1913), women's rights activist
- Elizabeth Russell (1836–1928), missionary in Japan
- Gertrude Strohm (1843–1927) author, compiler, and game designer

== Gallery ==
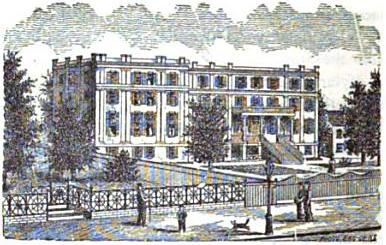
Campus in 1886

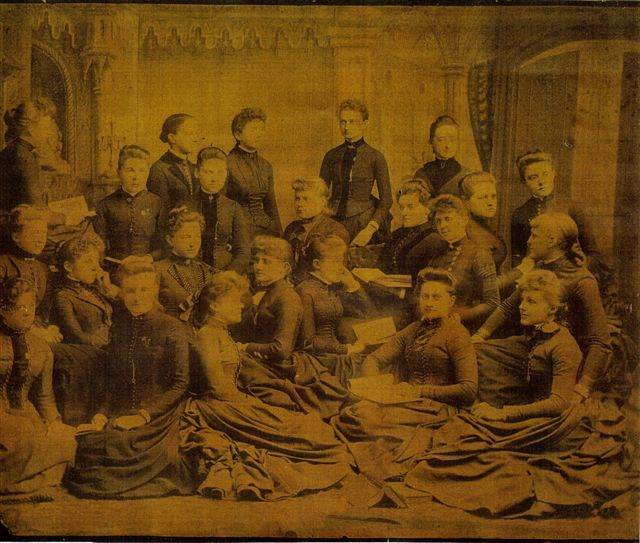
Class of 1888

== See also ==
- Female seminary
- Female education in the United States
