= Old Gym =

Historic building in Washington, Pennsylvania, USA

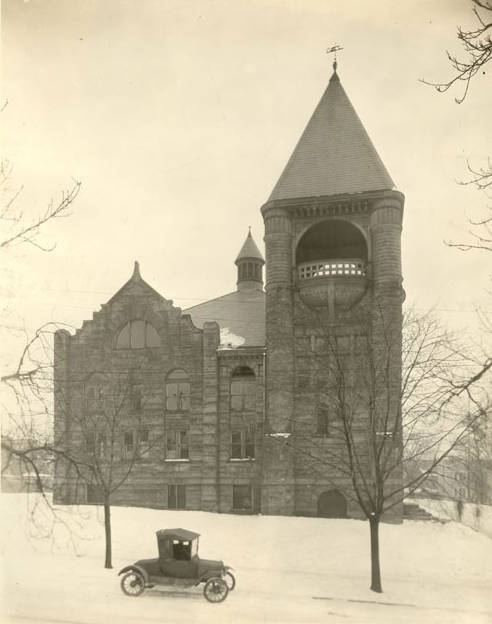
- Old Gym in 1922
- Interactive map of the Old Gym area

General information
- Architectural style: Romanesque revival
- Location: Washington, Pennsylvania
- Coordinates: 40°10′16″N 80°14′29.9″W
- Current tenants: Swanson Wellness Center
- Construction started: 1892
- Completed: 1893
- Renovated: 1926, 2002
- Cost: $40,000
- Owner: Washington & Jefferson College

Design and construction
- Architect: Arthur Bates Jennings

The Old Gym is a historic building at Washington & Jefferson College in Washington, Pennsylvania. It currently houses a modern exercise facility featuring cardiovascular, resistance, and strength-training equipment. The building also features a three-lane indoor track suspended above the main floor.

Prior to the construction of the Old Gym, students exercised and engaged in athletics under the grandstands at College Field. The exterior is Cleveland sandstone. In the early years, the interior space was used for basketball and as an auditorium. The basement once held a bowling alley and a swimming pool. Following renovations in 1927, where the interior was re-faced with brick and the swimming pool was expanded, the building was supposed to have been turned into a memorial hall for President James D. Moffat, but those plans never materialized. By 1938, the building was unable to host any intercollegiate athletic events, and during World War II, it was used as the Army Administration School. After the construction of the Henry Memorial Center, the building no longer housed any athletic events. Instead, the Old Gym was used for student activities and maintenance. In 2002, the Old Gym was renovated to make room for the Swanson Wellness Center.

== Facilities ==
The Old Gym is home to the Swanson Wellness Center, a modern exercise facility serving the entire College community. The main floor area has a variety of cardiovascular training equipment, including ten treadmills, five exercise bikes, and five elliptical running machines. The strength-training equipment consists of free weight machines, a weight rack, and 5 squat racks. The facility also has various resistance machines. The Old Gym also has a three-lane indoor track suspended above the main floor.

According to campus folklore, the (now filled-in) swimming pool in the basement was first constructed by students who simply dug a hole in the basement to create a "mud hole," which was then cemented.

== History ==
=== Construction and initial configuration ===
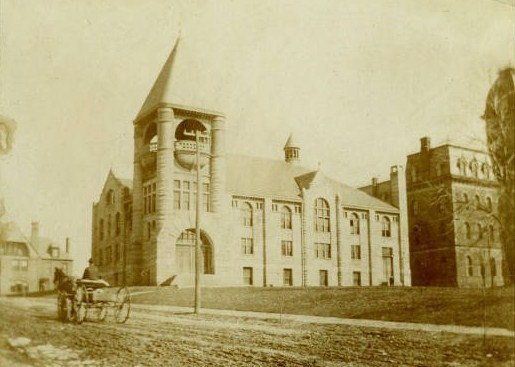
Old Gym in 1893

Plans for the Old Gym were spearheaded by President James D. Moffat, who solicited funds from alumni and friends of the college. Construction ran through 1892 before being completed in 1893 with a final cost of $40,000. The church-like exterior is made of Cleveland sandstone from the Amherst quarry near Cleveland, Ohio. Cement and hard pine were also used. The finished building measures 110 feet (34 m) by 65 feet (20 m) and 2 stories high.

Prior to the construction of the Old Gym, students exercised and engaged in athletics under the grandstands at College Field.

The interior was finished with marble partitions, a concrete floor, nickeled pipe, and hard wood. The water fixtures contained both hot and cold water, the interior was heated with steam and lighted by gas and electric lights. The main floor athletic space, normally used for basketball, could be turned into an auditorium seating 1,700 for commencement and other occasions. A gallery for athletic spectators was suspended from the roof timbers and contained seating for additional spectators, leaving the main floor unobstructed. The gallery doubled as a 1/20th mi running track. The basement facilities included a bowling alley, space for base-ball throwing, shot and hammer putting, and a 25x16x6 ft swimming pool. In addition to these athletic spaces, the basement had a locker room and a bath and shower facilities. The college experienced an increase in enrollment, partially attributed to the college's expanded physical education facilities and an increased emphasis on systematic physical exercise.

During the summer of 1915, the gym was reconditioned with the addition of a new water heating system and a miniature post office, allowing students to store individual exercise direction cards. The woodwork was cleaned and twice varnished.

=== Renovation ===
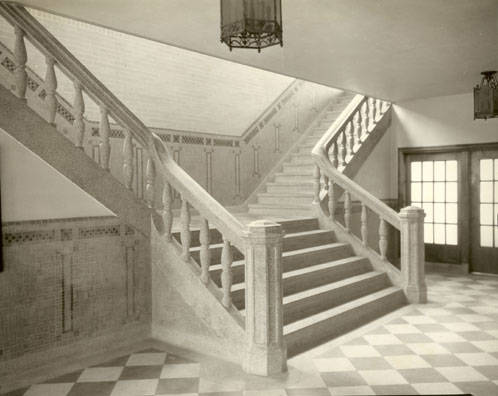
Newly remodeled stairs in 1927

By 1926, the Old Gym was deemed too cramped for its athletic purposes and the Board of Trustees developed a plan to build a new gymnasium facility "squares from the campus" and to convert the Old Gym into a memorial hall in honor of President Moffat. Whole the Old Gym was renovated, the re-purposing plans did not come to fruition. In the fall of 1927, the interior of the gym was gutted and reinforced with face-brick and the gym floor was reconstructed. The steel rods supporting the gallery and running track were replaced and reinforced with large iron girders. Wooden-framed windows were replaced with non-transparent steel-framed windows. The stairs leading to the gallery were shifted to the north entrance and rebuilt. The ventilating system was also replaced. The basement swimming pool was replaced by a regulation size (60 x 20 foot) pool adorned with "fancy tile," allowing for the first intercollegiate swimming team. In 1928, the Red & Black declared the reconstructed gymnasium "one of the best in the district."

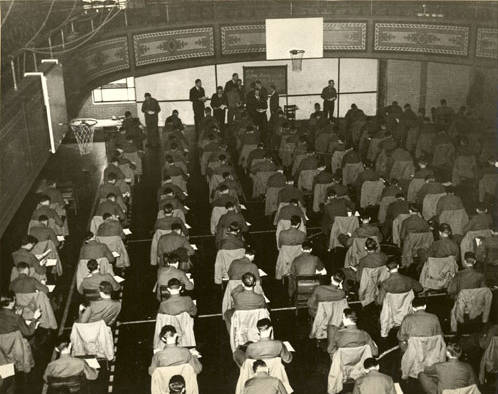
Army Administration School in 1944

By 1938, the building was again deemed too outdated to host major athletic events and intercollegiate basketball games were moved to Washington High School. However, the gym was still used by fraternities for intramural athletics. During World War II, the college made the Old Gym available to the Army Administration School that had taken up residence on campus and the gym was used by hundreds of soldiers to receive their "training in classifications." The gym was also used for Saturday evening dances during the war years. Enrollment rapidly doubled to 1,100 following the war, and students were forced to sleep in the gym. Even though enrollment had leveled off to around 800, the college's overall athletic facilities were considered poor, worse than most high schools at that time.

=== Obsolescence ===
By the early 1960s, President Boyd Crumrine Patterson recognized that the Old Gym, even if modernized, could no longer satisfy the College's athletic needs and commenced plans to build the Henry Memorial Center, which was completed in 1970. The Old Gym saw its last on June 7, 1969 and the Henry Center became the location of all large indoor events. The Old Gym became the temporary home to the maintenance department, with its long-term fate undecided. Various proposals were floated, including converting the building into a student activities facility with a coffee house, offices for student clubs, a student dark room, and a stage. The building was placed under the control of student government, who allocated space for the proposed dark room and a book store run by Alpha Phi Omega. In 1971, a plan was submitted by Thomas Struthers, a designer from Pittsburgh, to turn the building into a theater-auditorium at a cost of over $20,000. In September, the student government organization voted to remove their support and funding for the plan and it died.

Over the next several years, the swimming pool was filled in and the rest of the basement was renovated and re-purposed as office space. In 1984, the basement became the headquarters for the offices and student classrooms for the U.S. Army detachment of the ROTC. Additionally, the basement became the headquarters for the College radio station WJCR-FM and the Student Government headquarters. The main floor was still used for dances and other student activities. The ROTC left campus in 1991 and the office space was reallocated among the student organizations, including the radio station, the yearbook, the newspaper offices, Student Government, and the Greek Council.

=== Second renovation ===
In 2002, the interior of the Old Gym was gutted and renovated into a modern campus wellness center, featuring strength-training machines, free weights, and cardiovascular equipment, including elliptical trainers and recumbent bicycles. The running track in the gallery was renovated and a new sound system and improved ventilation system was installed. The new fitness center was named the Swanson Wellness Center, named for John and Janet Swanson. A 2004 restoration grant from the Department of Housing and Urban Development was used to replace windows in the Old Gym with energy efficient ones that matched the original design.

== Gallery ==
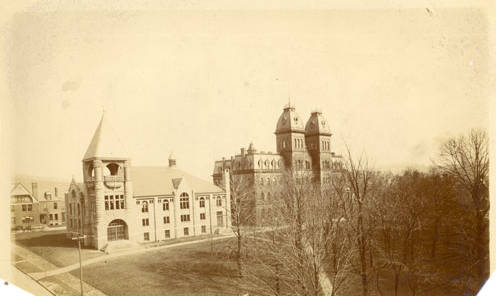
Old Gym in 1900

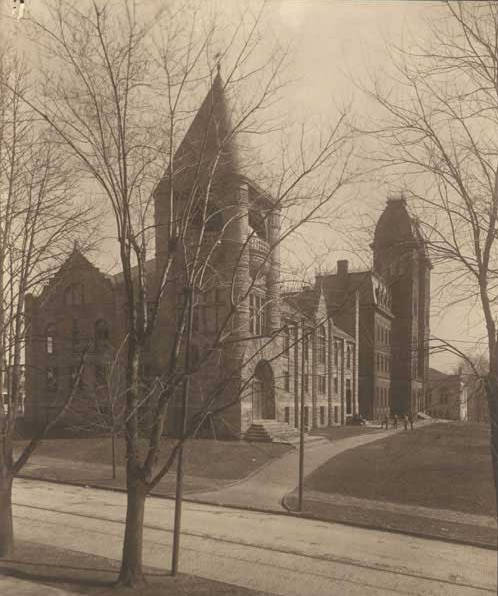
Old Gym in 1910
