= Swanson Science Center =

Academic science center

Coordinates: 40.16880°N 80.24087°W

John A. Swanson Science Center
- Interactive map of the John A. Swanson Science Center area

General information
- Type: Academic
- Location: Washington, Pennsylvania
- Construction started: September 2008
- Completed: February 2010
- Cost: $33 million

Technical details
- Floor area: 47,500 square feet (4,410 m^{2})

Design and construction
- Main contractor: Einhorn Yaffee Prescott Architecture & Engineering

The John A. Swanson Science Center, also known as the Swanson Science Center is an academic building on the campus of Washington & Jefferson College. It was completed in February 2010 and was named after John A. Swanson, an engineer and businessman on the Board of Trustees, who donated $10 million towards its construction. This 47,500 square feet (4,410 m^{2}) facility houses classrooms for Chemistry, Physics, Biophysics and Biochemistry and was designed to match its neighboring historic campus architecture. Its learning facilities include wet and dry teaching laboratories, faculty and student research labs, and a multi-disciplinary lab designed for non-science majors.

The marble-lined grand entrance leads to a three-story atrium with marble pillars and Palladian windows facing Route 40 and the common area is designed to attract non-science students. It was designed to satisfy the LEED Silver qualifications for green buildings.

== Facilities ==
The Swanson Science Center is a three-story brick building at the intersection of East Maiden and South Lincoln Streets in Washington, Pennsylvania. The 47,500 square feet (4,410 m^{2}) facility, which houses classrooms for Chemistry, Physics, Biophysics and Biochemistry, was designed to match its neighboring historic campus architecture. Its learning facilities include wet and dry teaching laboratories, faculty and student research labs, faculty offices, conference rooms, and a multi-disciplinary lab designed for non-science majors The building is capped with a 10,000 pounds (4,500 kg) cupola.

The marble-lined grand entrance leads to a three-story atrium with marble pillars and Palladian windows facing Route 40. An adjacent common area is designed to attract non-science students. The hallways have built-in cherry benches and marking board-lined walls. Parkhurst Dining Services operates a cafe inside the building.

For safety purposes, the smoke evacuator units are contained within the recessed lights in the ceiling, which could quickly ventilate the building in the event of a fire or chemical leak. The floors are overstabilized to have a zero vibration factor, which is necessary for the laboratory spaces because of the proximity to Route 40. Classroom lighting in based on motion-sensor lighting. The roof contains a 5,000 US gallons (19,000 L) water containment tank to collect rainwater, which is used for the toilets.

== Funding, planning, and construction ==
Plans for the construction of the Swanson Science Center were announced in May 2007, with an expected completion date in 2010. The building was named after John A. Swanson, an engineer and businessman on the Board of Trustees, who donated $10 million towards its construction. A groundbreaking ceremony for the building, located at the site of the former McIlvaine Hall, was held on September 12, 2008. In 2009, the college applied for $4.5 million tax-exempt educational facilities note from the Washington County Industrial Development Authority The total estimated cost for the construction of the Swanson Science Center was $33 million. Tuition was not increased to pay for the building. During the building's dedication ceremony, members of the college community contributed a variety of items to be placed in a time capsule in the building.

The design and external appearance of the building was designed to match the surrounding campus architecture, including Dieter-Porter Hall and Lazear Hall. It was also designed to satisfy the LEED Silver qualifications for green buildings. The construction project was managed by the Einhorn Yaffee Prescott Architecture & Engineering firm. In April 2008, the location of the building had to be shifted several feet towards Maiden Street after three members of the Washington City Council voted to reject an offer from the college to purchase Strawberry Alley, which runs through the campus. The college had offered $102,500 for the alleyway, which had an appraised value of $2,500. Following the vote, the Mayor of Washington indicated that one of the three nay votes had reneged on an agreement to accept the offer. Instead of accepting the offer, the City Council wanted to levy a $100 annual municipal services fee on all students, a proposal that would have been illegal under Pennsylvania law. The fee proposal never came to a vote, and in March 2010, the City Council voted unanimously to vacate Strawberry Alley, allowing the college to assume ownership of it for free.

The site of the Swanson Science Center is home to a historical marker in honor of Rebecca Harding Davis, an influential journalist and author who had attended the Washington Female Seminary, which had been on that site. The effort to place the marker there was led by Washington & Jefferson College English professor, and Harding descendant, Dr. Jennifer Harding.
