= John Leighton Stewart =

American journalist (1876–1940)

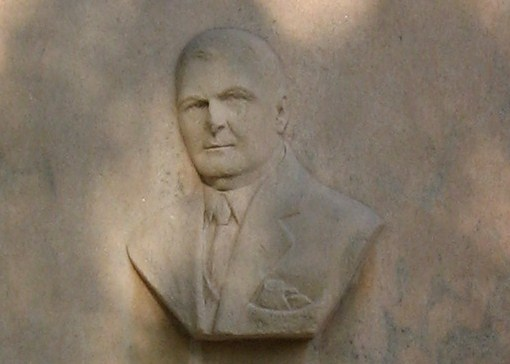
- Close up of the John L. Stewart Tower
- Born: August 12, 1876; Bakerstown, Pennsylvania
- Died: May 31, 1940 (aged 63)
- Monuments: John L. Stewart Tower at McIlvaine Hall
- Education: Washington & Jefferson College; Harvard Law School
- Spouse: Margaretta Donnan Stewart

John Leighton Stewart (August 12, 1876 - May 31, 1940) was a prominent American businessman and newspaper publisher of the Washington Observer and Washington Reporter newspapers in Washington, Pennsylvania.

== Biography ==
He was born in Bakerstown, Pennsylvania on August 12, 1876 to Reverend William G. and Jennie Wright Stewart. He graduated from Washington & Jefferson College in 1899 and attended Harvard Law School.

He and Ernest F. Acheson owned the Washington Observer and the afternoon Washington Reporter newspapers in Washington, Pennsylvania, which eventually merged to form the Observer-Reporter. He was a trustee of Washington & Jefferson College and of the Washington Female Seminary. He was a trustee of The Washington Hospital.

He founded the Pennsylvania Newspaper Publishers Association.

== Death ==
He died on May 31, 1940. His wife, Margaretta Donnan Stewart, took over control of the Observer-Reporter.

== Legacy ==
The John L. Stewart Clock Tower on the northwest corner of the McIlvane Hall at Washington & Jefferson College is named in his honor. Before McIlvane Hall was demolished in 2008, the clock chimed to note the hour.

== Gallery ==
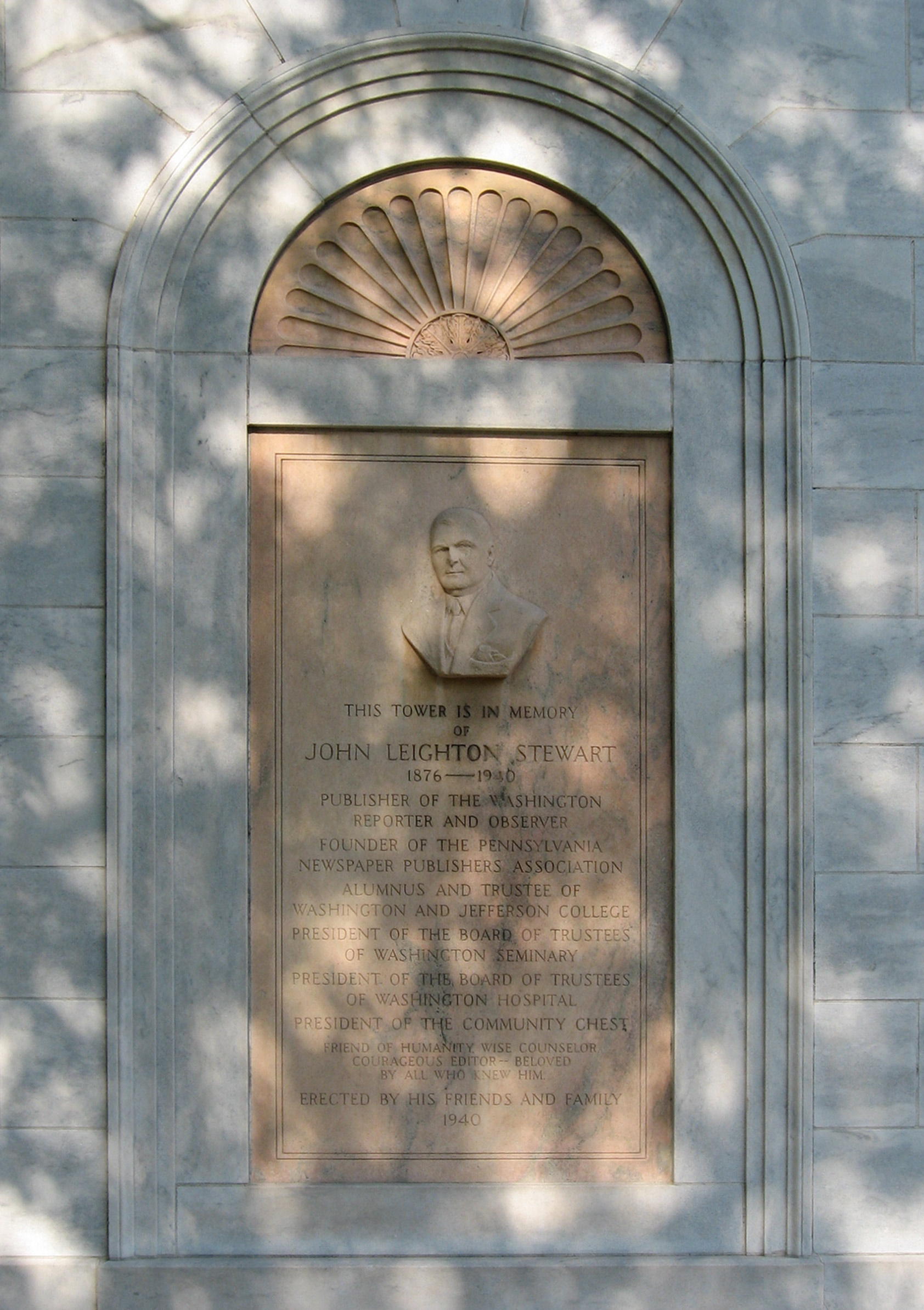
The John L. Stewart Tower at McIlvane Hall

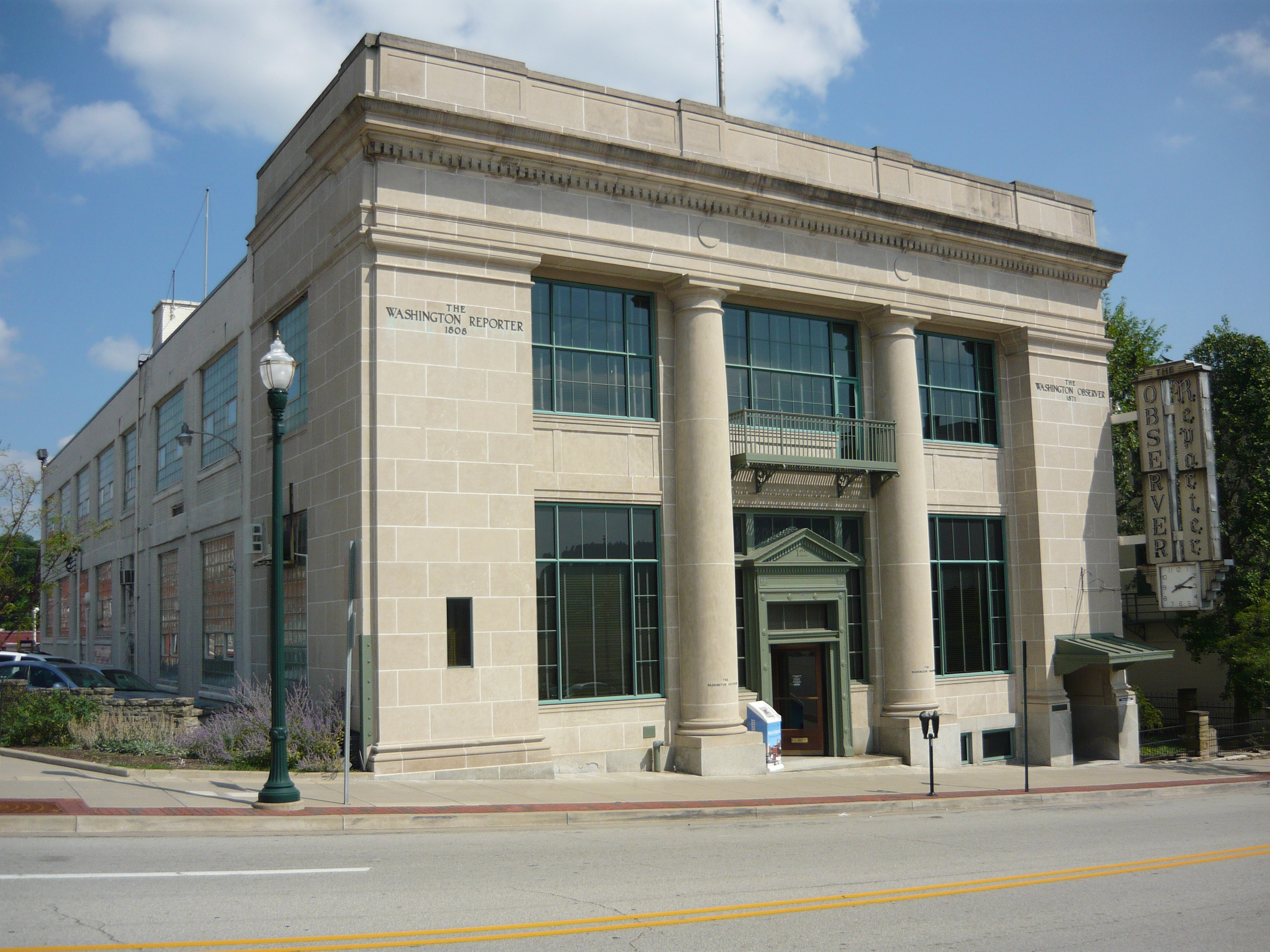
The Observer-Reporter building in Washington, Pennsylvania

== Bibliography ==
- John Woolf Jordan; Thomas Lynch Montgomery; Ernest Spofford; Frederic Antes Godcharies, eds. (1914). "Stewart, John Leighton". Encyclopedia of Pennsylvania biography. Vol. 1. Lewis Historical Publishing Co. p. 295.
