= John A. Swanson =

American engineer

- Education: Cornell University; University of Pittsburgh
- Known for: Founder of ANSYS, Inc.
- Spouse: Janet
- Awards: John Fritz Medal (2004)

John A. Swanson is an American engineer, entrepreneur, and philanthropist. Swanson is the founder of ANSYS, Inc., a John Fritz Medal winner, and a member of the National Academy of Engineering. He is internationally regarded as an authority and pioneer in the application of finite-element methods to engineering.

== Career ==
Swanson graduated with a bachelor's degree and a master's degree in mechanical engineering from Cornell University in 1962 and 1963, respectively. He went on to earn a PhD in applied mechanics from the University of Pittsburgh in 1966. Swanson began his engineering career in 1963 at Westinghouse Astronuclear Laboratory in Pittsburgh and was responsible for stress analysis of the components in NERVA nuclear reactor rockets and was supervisor of the core analysis and methods group and the manager of the structural analysis group. While there he used and developed computer codes to model and predict transient stresses and displacements of the reactor system. Developing a 3-D analysis model, he wished to integrate different computer codes in order to streamline the processing, but left Westinghouse in 1969 when he was not supported in his endeavors. He then founded Swanson Analysis Systems, doing both software development and consulting. The consulting business was sold to a friend, and the software development business became ANSYS, Inc., in his home in Pittsburgh in 1970 to develop, support and market the ANSYS simulation software program he was developing. The software became an industry leader for assisting engineers and designers in optimizing product development processes in the aerospace, automotive, biomedical, manufacturing and electronics industries by simulating how products will function in real life. The company eventually grew to employ 4,000 employees and distributes products through a network of business partners in more than 40 countries. Swanson was ANSYS's president, chief executive officer, and director. He retired from ANSYS in March 1999 as the company's chief technologist.

Swanson was named the 1987 Pittsburgh Engineer of the Year by the American Society of Mechanical Engineers (ASME). In 1990, Swanson won the Computers in Engineering Award for outstanding contributions to the engineering & computing industries. In 1994 he was named One of the Top 5 of the Top 50 R&D Stars in the US by IndustryWeek and was elected as an ASME Fellow. In 1998, Swanson won the ASME Applied Mechanics Award and received the University of Pittsburgh School of Engineering's Distinguished Alumni Award. He was awarded honorary membership in the ASME in 2003. In 2004, Swanson was awarded the John Fritz Medal, considered the highest and most prestigious award in the engineering profession, from the American Association of Engineering Societies. In 2006 he was awarded the ASME President's Award for significant contributions to the engineering profession, and in 2009 he was elected to the National Academy of Engineering.

Swanson is a member of the ASME Foundation's board of directors and is a member of the board of trustees. He is on the board of trustees of the University of Pittsburgh since 2006, and on the board of trustees at Washington & Jefferson College. Swanson is a consultant and trainer in the field of engineering simulation at ANSYS. Now residing in Florida, Swanson joined the University of South Florida Institute for Advanced Discovery & Innovation in 2014, where he is a member and courtesy professor.

== Philanthropy ==
At Cornell University, Swanson established the Swanson Fund for Excellence in Undergraduate Education and endowed the director of the Swanson Laboratory for Engineering Simulation in the Cornell University College of Engineering. He also made two significant gifts in support of the Duffield Hall project, where an atrium was named in recognition of his support, and established the Dorothy G. Swanson Award, in honor of his mother, at the school.

At Washington & Jefferson College, Swanson donated $10 million to fund construction of the John A. Swanson Science Center that will primarily houses physics and chemistry departments. Swanson's $287,000 donation to the college established the Swanson Wellness Center in the school's Old Gym. He and his wife Janet also funded the Janet L. Swanson Tennis Center.

At the University of Pittsburgh, Swanson donated tens of millions to the university and its engineering school, including a $41.3 million gift in 2007 which, at that time, was the largest single gift ever by an individual to the university. At the University of Pittsburgh, he has created the John A. Swanson Institute for Technical Excellence, which houses the John A. Swanson Center for Micro and Nano Systems; the John A. Swanson Center for Product Innovation; and the RFID (Radio Frequency Identification) Center of Excellence. He also has established the John A. Swanson Embedded Computing Laboratory in Computer Engineering. Swanson also helped to fund an extensive renovation of the school of engineering's Benedum Hall and created an endowed discretionary fund to support scholarships and various projects at the school. In 2007, the university renamed its school of engineering to the Swanson School of Engineering in his honor.

On May 2, 2010, Swanson delivered the commencement address at the University of Pittsburgh. He was awarded an honorary Doctor of Science degree by the university during the ceremony.

On May 19, 2012, Swanson delivered the keynote address at the 213th Commencement ceremony at Washington & Jefferson College and received an honorary degree.
