= Conemaugh Health System =

Hospital network in Pennsylvania, U.S.

- Type: Public
- Industry: Health Care and Social Assistance Industry, NAICS 62
- Headquarters: Johnstown, Pennsylvania, U.S.
- Area served: Western Pennsylvania
- Key people: (CEO)
- Number of employees: 5000+
- Parent: Duke LifePoint Healthcare
- Website: www.conemaugh.org

Conemaugh Health System, a member of Duke LifePoint Healthcare, is the largest health care provider in west central Pennsylvania, with multiple hospitals, physician offices, and outpatient centers in eleven counties. Conemaugh Health System is located in Johnstown, Pennsylvania.

CHS offers a continuum of care, from highly specialized services such as a Level 1 Regional Resource Trauma Center and Level 3 Neonatal Intensive Care Unit. Conemaugh Health System is also home to the Conemaugh School of Nursing and Allied Health, as well as Graduate Medical Education for residents in Emergency Medicine, Family Medicine, Internal Medicine, Surgery, Pharmacy, and Health Psychology. Conemaugh Health System was created in the wake of the Johnstown Flood of 1889 which gained national attention and caused the outpouring resource to help the local community. Among those who originally established the hospital system was Clara Barton, the founder of the American Red Cross.

Conemaugh serves as the largest medical provider for Cambria County, Somerset County, Blair County, Huntingdon County, Westmoreland County. Fulton, County, Indiana County, Clearfield County, Jefferson County, and Bedford County.

== History ==
The first hospital in the health system, Conemaugh Valley Memorial Hospital, opened its doors December 2, 1889 six months following the catastrophe of the Great Johnstown Flood of 1889. 2,209 people were killed in the flood, and much of the town's infrastructure was demolished or unusable for months following the disaster. Temporary medical quarters were established at St. Mark's Episcopal church while more permanent accommodations for the survivors could be created. The American Red Cross responded a few days after the flood by establishing a temporary hospital in the city's 8th ward in a wooden farmhouse in the midst of a local orchard. In 1892, a permanent stone structure was completed for the new hospital, and the Red Cross withdrew its field hospital from the region.

In 1896 a training school for nurses was opened at the hospital, assisting with the medical and surgical care that was being offered at the hospital proper. It remains in operation as the Conemaugh School of Nursing. The physical facility of Conemaugh hospital continued to expand in the coming years with the construction of its modern facility on Franklin Street in 1923.

In more recent years the hospital has noted that it is shifting away from inpatient care to smaller regional outpatient facilities in the region.

== Subsidiaries and facilities ==
Conemaugh Health System (CHS) is the parent corporation for the following healthcare entities:

- Conemaugh Memorial Medical Center – located in Johnstown, Pennsylvania this campus services as the primary medical campus of the health system. It consists of two inpatient medical centers that were merged in 1997: Good Samaritan Medical Center (previously known as Mercy Hospital), a Catholic hospital, founded in 1910, and Conemaugh Valley Medical Center founded in 1889 following the disaster of the Johnstown Flood. It currently sustains 537 inpatient beds.
- Conemaugh Meyersdale Medical Center – located in Meyersdale, Pennsylvania it was founded in 1952 to attend to the rural medical needs of Somerset County.
- Conemaugh Miners Medical Center – located in Hastings, Pennsylvania, it was originally designed to serve the local coal mining community. True to its original purpose, the hospital itself still offers Black Lung screenings.
- Conemaugh Nason Medical Center– located in Roaring Spring, Pennsylvania, previously known as 'Nason Hospital' until its acquisition in 2017. It is an inpatient 45-bed facility that primarily serves rural regions of southern Blair County and northern Bedford County, as well as the Broad Top region of Huntingdon County.
- Conemaugh Physician Group (CPG) – is a multi-specialty, integrated group practice that represents the physicians of Conemaugh Health System
- Conemaugh School of Nursing – located adjacent to Conemaugh Memorial Medical Center, it has been graduating nurses since opening in 1892, and offers a large educational selection of other medical disciplines. It has been fully accredited since 1918. The school of nursing also partners with various Pennsylvania universities for the transferring of academic credits. These include: Drexel University, Carlow University, Mount Aloysius College, and Chamberlain University. The school offers other Allied Health programs as well, such as the program for Surgical Technology, which it offers in conjunction with the University of Pittsburgh at Johnstown.
- Conemaugh East Hills – located in Richland, Pennsylvania, this facility opened in 2020 and is largely an outpatient medical facility. It includes diagnostic imaging, cardiac/pulmonary rehab services, pulmonary function testing, outpatient surgery, pain/neuroscience clinic, and an orthopedic practice.

In 2005, Conemaugh Health System also acquired Lee Hospital (previously Johnstown City Hospital) from the University of Pittsburgh Medical Center in downtown Johnstown, incorporating it into their inpatient clinical network. Founded in 1916 it currently holds the name Conemaugh Memorial Medical Center – Lee Campus and serves as a Select Specialty Hospital. It is located two miles from Conemaugh's main campus. As of 2018, Duke Lifepoint Healthcare announced they have no plans to abandon the former inpatient hospital, instead converting it for non-clinical purposes

In 2007, Windber Medical Center formally left Conemaugh Health System amid administrative issues. It had been a subsidiary since 1970.

=== The 1889 Foundation ===
The 1889 Foundation is a non-profit that provides medical and philanthropic aid to residents of Cambria County and Somerset County. Originally founded in 1993 as the 'Conemaugh Health Foundation', it remained a department within Conemaugh Health System until 2014. At that time the hospital was purchased by Duke Lifepoint Healthcare, and became a for-profit hospital, after which the 1889 Foundation was formed as a separate 501(c)3 non-profit organization.

== Graduate medical education ==
Conemaugh is a Teaching hospital and has a large number of students and 84 residents on its clinical staff. Graduate medical education (GME) was introduced at Conemaugh Valley Hospital in 1915 for three original residents. The original generalist program was shut down in 1975 and replaced with a modern medical graduate education program. This program has expanded over the years to include: General Surgery (1961), Family Medicine (1971), Internal Medicine (1972), Pharmacy (2002), Emergency Medicine (2008), and Health Psychology (2012). Conemaugh also attracts regular medical student rotations from Lake Erie College of Osteopathic Medicine, Drexel University College of Medicine, Temple University School of Medicine and Philadelphia College of Osteopathic Medicine. Conemaugh also maintains a residency program for the American Osteopathic Association, as well as a sports medicine fellowship.

== Acquisition by Duke LifePoint Healthcare ==
In 2013 it was formally announced the Conemaugh was seeking affiliation with other medical systems in the region because of financial constraint. On September 3, 2014, Conemaugh Health System was acquired for $500 million by Duke LifePoint Healthcare, a joint venture between Duke University Health System and LifePoint Hospitals. Since its corporate acquisition the hospital continues to expand its pool of physicians and specialists, as well as expand its primary medical campus in Johnstown, Pennsylvania. In 2021, the main campus was expanded to make way for additional inpatient/outpatient cardiovascular services as well as specialized imaging services.
