= Brooks Park =

Softball field in Pennsylvania

- Interactive map of Brooks Park
- Location: Washington, Pennsylvania
- Coordinates: 40°10′30.9″N 80°14′24″W
- Owner: Washington & Jefferson College
- Operator: Washington & Jefferson College
- Surface: grass

Construction
- Renovated: 2004

Tenant
- Washington & Jefferson College Presidents

Brooks Park is a softball field in Washington, Pennsylvania, United States, used by the Washington & Jefferson Presidents softball team. The field dimensions are 200 feet (61 m) down the lines and 205 feet (62 m) to center field. It also has home and away dugouts and separate bullpens.

In 2004, the field was renovated with funding provided by the Robert and Susan Brooks and the Brooks Foundation. The entire field was re-sodded and an outfield wall was added. Off the field, a new scoreboard was installed and a public address system and press box were added.
