= Ross Memorial Park and Alexandre Stadium =

Athletic facility in North Franklin Township, Pennsylvania

- Interactive map of Ross Memorial Park and Alexandre Stadium
- Location: 2 Washington Federal Way, Washington, PA
- Coordinates: 40.154622°N 80.281198°W
- Owner: Washington & Jefferson College
- Operator: Washington & Jefferson College
- Surface: FieldTurf
- Field size: 233,000 ft.^{2}

Construction
- Opened: 2004

Tenants
- Washington & Jefferson Presidents (NCAA DIII) (2004–present); Washington BlueSox (2006–2008)

Ross Memorial Park and Alexandre Stadium is a combined multi-purpose outdoor athletic facility in North Franklin Township, Pennsylvania owned by Washington & Jefferson College. The playing surface is made of FieldTurf, like the college's football stadium, Cameron Stadium. At 233,000-square-foot (21,600 m^{2}), the facility was the home of the largest continuous artificial playing surface in the world at its completion in 2004.

Located adjacent to Wild Things Park, the facility accommodates two full soccer and lacrosse fields. In the fall, Alexandre Stadium is home to the college's men's and women's soccer teams; in the spring, the men's lacrosse team.

Ross Memorial Park is the home field for the W&J baseball team. RMP hosted the 2015, 2016 and 2017 NCAA Division III Mideast Regional Championships. One of the two soccer fields overlaps the outfield of Ross Memorial Park, and the facility is adapted to baseball use by altering the fence and revealing the base areas. The stadium contains four hundred chairback seats in addition to a press box and a state-of-the-art scoreboard.

The facility also is home to the Ross Locker Room facility, providing an official home for baseball, men's and women's soccer, and men's and women's lacrosse. The facility, adjacent to the fields, houses three full-sized locker rooms, an athletic training room, an officials' locker room, and an equipment and laundry room. The locker room facility was dedicated on April 19, 2008, in honor of James David Ross, thanks to a private donation from the Ross family. Ross was a manager of the Lower Burrell American Legion baseball team for 22 years, amassing over 600 wins leading the program to 17 league championships and eight Westmoreland County titles.
