= Cameron Stadium =

Football stadium in Washington, Pennsylvania, US

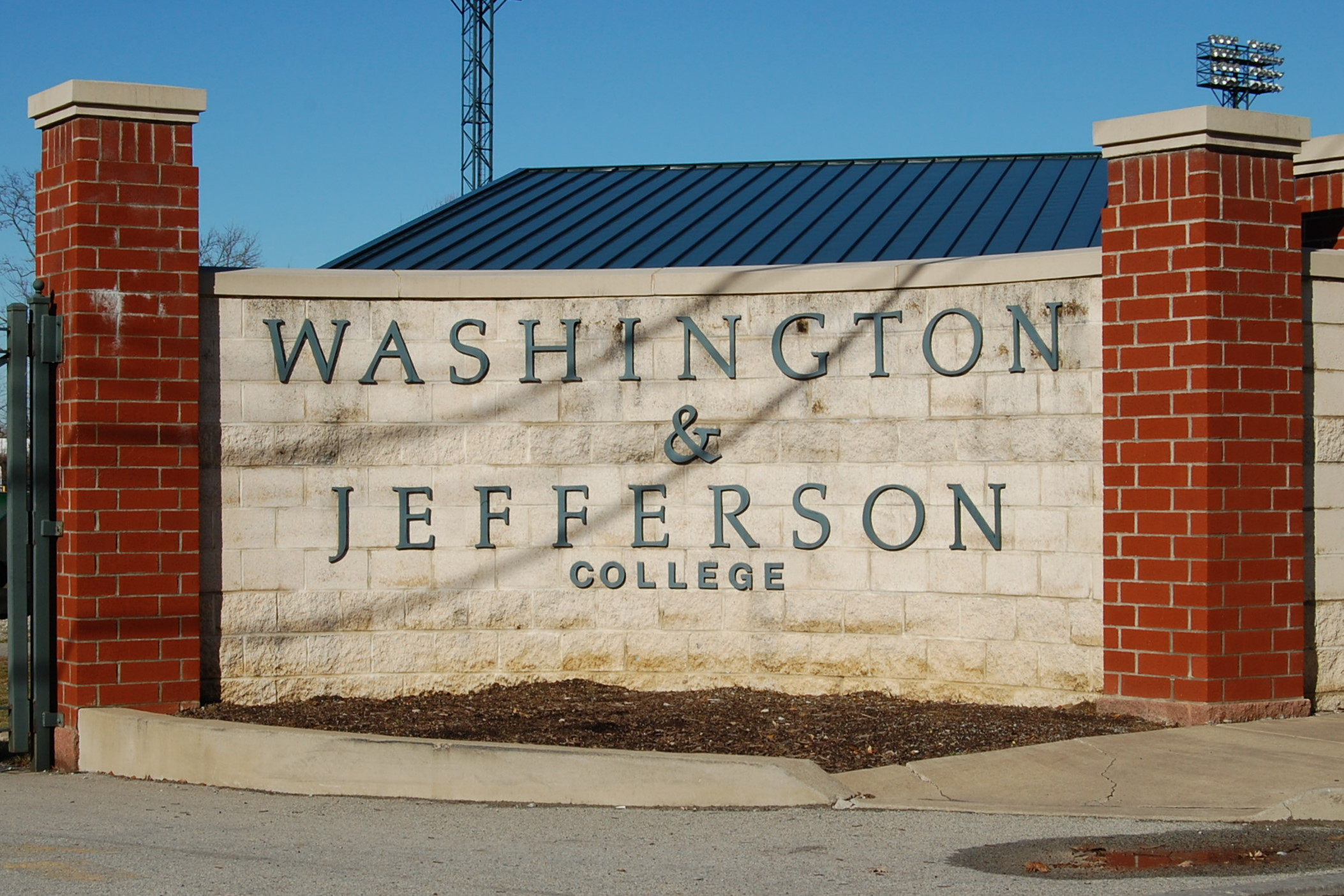
- Entrance to Cameron Stadium
- Interactive map of Cameron Stadium
- Former names: College Park (1885–1920); College Field (1920–2001); Cameron Stadium (2001–present)
- Location: 60 Park Avenue; Washington, Pennsylvania
- Coordinates: 40.1645°N 80.2457°W
- Owner: Washington & Jefferson College
- Capacity: 5,000
- Surface: Grass (pre-1999); FieldTurf (installed in 1999)

Construction
- Opened: 1885
- Renovated: 2001
- Architect: Kimball Design-Build Group(2001 renovations)
- General contractor: Landau Building Company(2001 renovations)

Cameron Stadium is an outdoor football stadium adjacent to the campus of Washington & Jefferson College in Washington, Pennsylvania.

== Facilities and amenities ==
Located one mile from campus. It is the host of W&J's home football games, men's and women's soccer, lacrosse, and field hockey, and intramural activities.

The main playing surface is Matrix turf, installed by Hellas Construction in 2009. The eight-lane, all-weather track was resurfaced in 2003.

The stadium is home to the Towler Hall, located next to the field house, which is the home to the W&J Athletic Hall of Fame. Plaques featuring the names of each individual that has been inducted into the Hall of Fame hang on the wall. Towler Hall also has a large banquet room with capacity for 135–150 people. The adjacent Eaton/Gentile Room contains athletic memorability from the college's past.

Athletic training rooms are located under the home bleachers. The training rooms are equipped with electric stimulation machines, ultrasound unit, a paraffin wax machine, and a large whirlpool.

== History ==
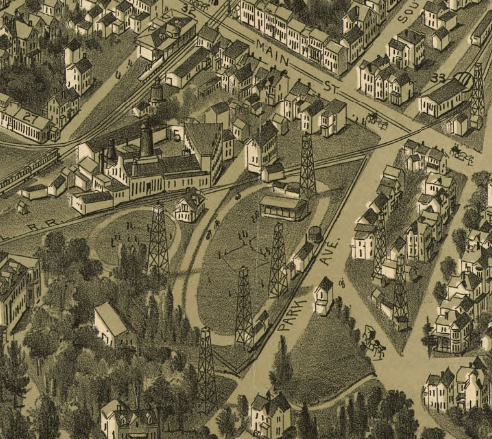
Map of Washington, showing the Old Fairgrounds in 1897. Note the oil wells.

In 1885, the college purchased the old Washington Fairgrounds, an 8-acre field in the south side of town, for athletic purposes. In order to finance the purchase of the property the college erected an oil well on the grounds. Students exercised in a makeshift facility under the grandstand in the years before the Old Gym was constructed in 1893. The field was known as College Park until being renamed College Field in 1920.

The college's 1968 campus master plan called for the construction of a new football stadium on Wade Avenue, which would have been within the East Washington Historic District.

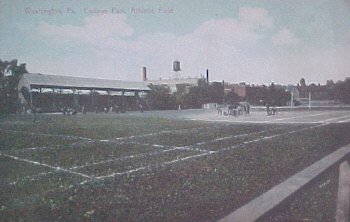
An early view of College Park

In 1990, the locker facilities received $500,000 worth of renovations and improvements.

In 1999, the stadium was renovated and expanded through a $2.5 million donation from the Cameron family, best known as the owners of Cameron Coca-Cola. The renovations included the installation of a new FieldTurf playing surface, the construction of an eight-lane outdoor track, the construction of improved visitor bleachers, and the installation of a new scoreboard. The next year, the college completed phase two of the renovation in 2000 saw the construction of expanded locker rooms, a new women's locker room, luxury suites, two new concession stands, three new ticket booths, and additional seating for 1,000 spectators. A state-of-the-art press box was constructed, along with hardware necessary for television and radio broadcasts. That same year, the college completed the Washington & Jefferson Athletic Hall of Fame, contained in the Eaton/Gentile Hall of Fame Room at Towler Hall. In 2001, the stadium was renamed Cameron Stadium.

Three years later, the locker room and training facilities located under the bleachers were renovated and the track was resurfaced and repainted. In 2008, the playing surface was replaced with RealGrass artificial turf, including multi-colored end zones and a new W&J College logo at the 50-yard line.
