= Red & Black (Washington & Jefferson College) =

Student newspaper in Pennsylvania, US

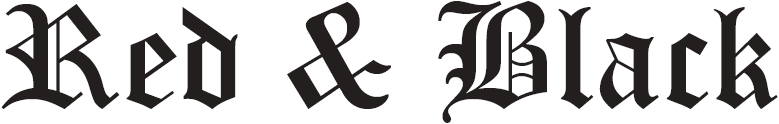

- Type: Student newspaper
- Owner: Washington & Jefferson College
- Founded: 1909
- Headquarters: Washington, Pennsylvania
- Price: Free
- Website: Red & Black

The Red & Black is the student newspaper for Washington & Jefferson College. The student staff handles all aspects of the production, including writing, editing, graphic design, layout, and advertising sales. The Red & Black features campus events and happenings, student and faculty art, student opinion, college athletic coverage, and local and world news. Founded in 1909, the paper goes to press every Thursday with a weekly circulation of 1,250 copies.

The Red & Black has been a member of the Society of Collegiate Journalists since 1924.

== Awards ==
In 2004, the Society of Professional Journalists (SPJ) named the Red & Black one of "Best All-Around Non-Daily newspapers" in the Northeast. In 2006, the Red & Black editorial staff was recognized by the SPJ for its editorial writing.

== Notable alumni ==
- Alberto Vilar, former billionaire
