= Henry Memorial Center =

Sports complex in Washington, Pennsylvania

Salvitti Family Gymnasium (Henry Memorial Center)
- Interactive map of Salvitti Family Gymnasium (Henry Memorial Center)
- Location: Washington, Pennsylvania
- Coordinates: 40.1725°N 80.2423°W
- Owner: Washington & Jefferson College
- Capacity: 1,500 (gymnasium); 300 (natatorium)

Construction
- Built: 1970 (Renovated Summer 2019)

Tenant
- Washington & Jefferson Presidents

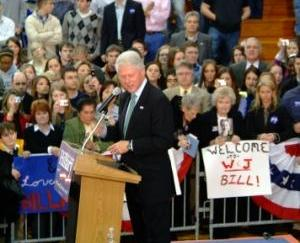
Bill Clinton speaking at the Henry Memorial Center during the 2008 Presidential primary election.

The Salvitti Family Gymnasium previously known as the Henry Memorial Center is a multi-purpose collegiate sports complex on the campus of Washington & Jefferson College. It houses two main athletic facilities, a gymnasium and a natatorium.

== History and architectural features ==
The Henry Memorial Center is adjacent to the Ross Recreation Center, a wrestling practice room, and Eaton Fitness Center. The new side of the building houses coaches’ and administrative offices. The bottom floor houses the locker room facilities and an athletic training room. The building was built in 1970 and renovated in the summer of 2019.

The main gymnasium serves as the home site for W&J's wrestling, volleyball, and men's basketball team and the women's basketball teams. Its renovated bleachers can hold 1,500 spectators.

The natatorium serves as the event center for the men's and women's swimming and diving teams as well as the men's and women's water polo squads. The facility has a six-lane, 25-yard pool, with depths ranging four to seven feet deep. The pool has a separate diving well and diving boards of one and three meter heights. A balcony overlooking the pool can house approximately 300 spectators.

The natatorium was the site of the 1976 and 1980 NCAA Division III Men's Swimming and Diving Championships.
