= Traditions of Washington & Jefferson College =

The traditions of Washington & Jefferson College are a key aspect of the culture of Washington & Jefferson College. One of the oldest traditions at Washington & Jefferson College were the "Freshman Rules", a system of rules and restrictions on freshmen. Failure by freshmen to follow these rules would subject them to beatings by upperclassmen or other punishments doled out by the "Freshman Court". During the 1870s and 1880s, the students engaged in organized athletic competitions, pitting the freshman versus sophomore classes in the "Olympic Games" that involved elaborate opening ceremonies and the smoking of a Pipe of Peace." Another form of physical contest between the freshman and sophomore classes were the annual "color rush," where the teams fought over control over strips of fabric, the "pole rush," where the teams battled to raise a flag up a flagpole, and the "cane rush" where the teams fought over control over a ceremonial cane. These contests generally devolved into outright gang violence.

The college cheer, "Whichi Coax", is so pervasive in college history and culture that in addition to being shouted during academic ceremonies and football games, it is also used as a salutation in correspondence between alumni. The college's fight song, "Good Ole W&J", is sung to the tune of "99 Bottles of Beer" and makes fun of a number of rival colleges, including the University of Pittsburgh and the Washington Female Seminary. For a large portion of the college's history, there was no official alma mater, but there were a number of other tradition hymns and songs.

== Songs and chants ==
=== Whichi Coax ===
Whichi Coax

Whichi coax, coax, coax
Whichi coax, coax, coax
Jay
Say, say, say, Jay
Say, say, say, Jay, Jay, JAY

The traditional college cheer, Whichi Coax, is based on the sound that frogs make in Aristophanes' Ancient Greek comedy, The Frogs. While the date of its origins are unknown, the cheer first appears in the 1892 yearbook. The cheer is similar to Yale University's college cheer, "Brick-ke-kex Coax", which is also based on The Frogs and appeared around the same time. Because of its tradition and connection to the college's history, President Tori Haring-Smith called it a "secret handshake among friends." The college yell is used during Honors Convocation ceremonies, Matriculation ceremonies, beginning-of-the-year Convocation ceremonies, campus re-dedications, and as closing salutations in letters among alumni. It also is to be yelled after the singing of the Alma Mater.

=== "Alma Mater of Washington & Jefferson College" and other songs ===
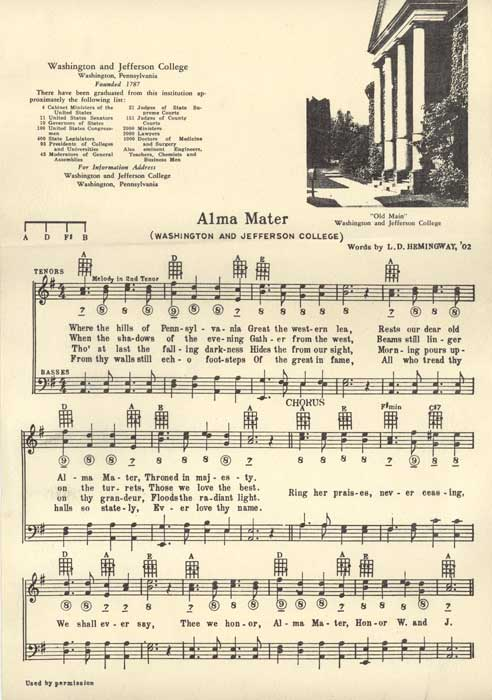
Sheet music for the "Alma Mater of Washington & Jefferson College"

The "Alma Mater of Washington & Jefferson College", lyrics by L. D. Hemingway, class of 1902, and set to an 1857 tune ("Annie Lisle") used by many colleges, was first printed in the 1902 book Songs of Washington & Jefferson College. However, the song was not listed in any commencement program until 1908. However, the exact date of its adoption as the official alma mater is not clear: the July 1908 edition of College Bulletin, an alumni publication, stated that the college had no recognized Alma Mater song, but expressed hope that this "defect would be remedied." Oddly, 1908 was also the first year that the song appeared in any Commencement ceremony. The alma mater is to be followed by a round of "Whichi Coax". The "Washington & Jefferson College Hymn", a different song from the alma mater, was composed by Julian G. Hearne, class of 1926. In 2006, the W&J Magazine reported on the existence of several other lost songs, including "My Term Report", "The Red and The Black", "M’Millan’s March", "Alumni Song", "The College Anthem", and "Red and Black."

=== "Good Ole W&J" ===
The college's fight song, "Good Ole W&J", was first sung in the 1920s. The song is to the tune of "99 Bottles of Beer." The lyrics of "And the Sem will surely fail" is a reference to the neighboring Washington Female Seminary, which ceased operations in 1948. After a peak in popularity during the 1940s, the tradition was lost during the 1960s. The song was re-introduced to the student body during a matriculation ceremony in August 2005, after newly installed president Tori Haring-Smith was sung the song over the phone by an alumnus from the 1940s. The rebirth of the song did come with one change: the addition of "and daughters" to the line "Wash-Jeff's been run by loyal sons/For generations back," in recognition of the fact that the college has been co-educational for 35 years.

"When I mentioned the song to an alum from that era, he remembered it and could sing with me over the phone. Imagine me in the middle of Harvard Square this summer on a scorching hot day, singing this tune into my cell phone."

— Tori Haring-Smith, describing the first time she heard "Good Ole' W&J"

== Olympic Games and Field Days ==
The classes of 1877 and 1876 began the tradition of holding annual "Olympic Games," where the freshman and sophomore classes would compete in various athletic events at the Old Fairgrounds. The opening ceremonies included partisan bands and the smoking of a "Pipe of Peace." During the 1881 Olympic Games, the competitions included the rope pull, the 100 yard dash, hop skip and jump, potato sack races, throwing of a base ball, 220 yard race, high jump, hurdle race, long jump, Indian wrestling, three legged race, 2 mile race, "scratch", and football. Traditionally, the competitors employed "ruses" to influence the officiating. These games eventually fell out of favor, as only 15 students from each class would participate. Instead, the student body preferred the "Field Days" tradition, a campus-wide student athletic campus-wide athletic festival run entirely by students, where all could participate.

== Color rush, pole rush, cane rush, and pushball ==
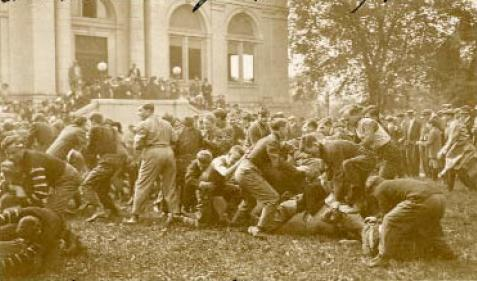
The 1911 color rush contest

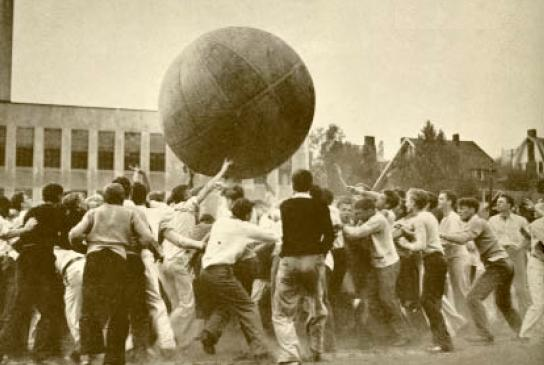
A game of pushball

During the late 19th and early 20th century, several forms of annual physical contests developed that pitted the freshmen classes against the sophomore class. In the 1890s and 1900s, the freshmen class and the sophomore class engaged in an annual "color rush" battle, where members of the freshmen class had strips of fabric sewn into their jackets after Monday chapel service and were led into the lawn between Old Main and Thompson Library. Members of the sophomore class would attack, attempting to take as many of the fabric strips as possible. These battles often left bruised bodies and hard feelings, as combatants often lost whole articles of clothing amid the "scrap". A similar event, the "pole rush," was founded in 1894 by the Class of 1897. In the pole rush, the freshman class raise their flag on a flagpole on campus and the sophomores would attempt to bring it down. Traditionally, the combatants would resort to dirty tricks to win, including dousing the opposing team with a "shower of ancient eggs and flour." By 1908, the rules were changed to prevent injuries, which had become commonplace. During the 1880s, the "cane rush" was traditionally a physically violent contest, where a member of the freshman class would taunt a sophomore with a cane, daring him to take it away from him. Next, 10 freshmen would place their hands on the cane, with a number of their classmates surrounding them, while the sophomores would run at the group, seeking to take the cane. After 12 minutes of bloody fighting, whichever class had the most hands on the cane would be the winner. The cane rush was seen as a rite of passage for freshmen. The rules of play changed over time; at times the cane was hidden on campus, with the object of the game to find the cane before the other class. The rushes, which had devolved from an annual rite of passage into serious physical violence, were banned by the faculty in 1913.

The campus' focus then turned to the game of pushball, which was founded in 1910. In this contest, two teams of 5 or 6 freshmen and sophomores battled each other over control of a 6-foot rubber ball. The objective of the game was to push the ball past the opposing team into a goal area, resulting in 2 points. To break a tie, 1 point was awarded for the team that had the ball in the opposition's goal area at the end of regulation. The popularity of this game waned and grew several times through the 1940s and 1950s.

== Freshman traditions ==
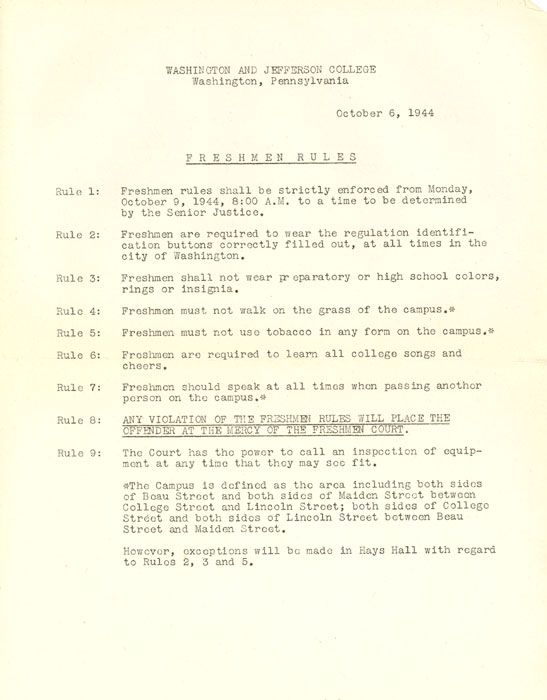
The Freshman Rules from 1944

One of the oldest traditions at Washington & Jefferson College were the "Freshman Rules," a system of rules and restrictions on freshmen. By tradition, the rules were to "make the frosh feel at home." Of all the rules, the sock inspection inspired the most fear, as upperclassmen were able to inspect the color and type of socks worn by any freshman at any time. Punishments for failing to wear Freshman Rules-compliant socks ranged from paddling to being drenched in the gym showers. The sock inspections often turned into a gang fight, with freshman defending their compatriot against upperclassmen.

In 1922, upperclassmen founded the "Freshman Court" was to enforce these rules. The court grew into a powerful campus organization, sponsoring contests and events for freshmen, in addition to dispensing punishment for violating the Freshman Rules. The rules changed frequently from year to year, but they generally required all freshmen to wear "dinks" and ties while on campus, as well as prescribed sock styles. Other rules included "Freshmen must not walk on the grass of the campus", "Freshmen are required to learn all College songs and cheers", "Freshmen shall not wear preparatory or high school colors, rings, or insignia", and "Freshmen should speak at all times when passing another person on campus". Most minor infractions resulted in a paddling or having their mouths washed out with soap; other punishments were ironic: freshmen found smoking on campus were punished by having to wear a Chesterfield sign, freshmen who missed a football game were forced to wear a large football schedule around their neck, and freshmen who forgot their handbook during chapel service were sentenced to wear a toilet seat around their neck. Records show that one freshman, whose offense was not recorded, was forced to wear toast over his ears and carry a sign reading "I am a ham sandwich."

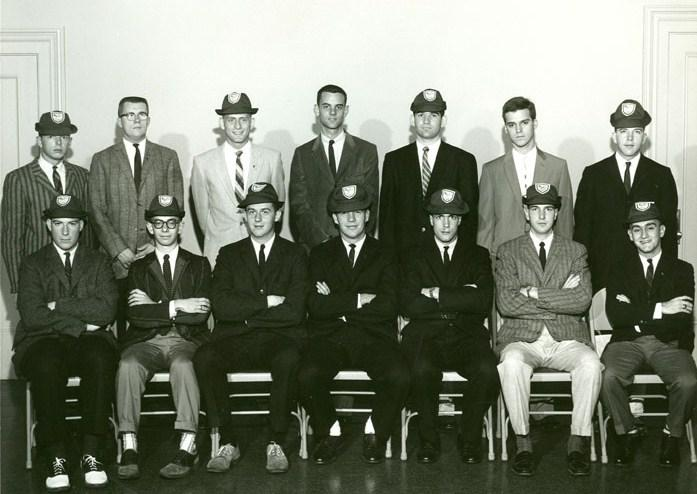
Members of Lex Ultimo at the beginning of the 1959 acadmemic year

By the 1930s, the year's freshman rules began to be lifted by the beginning of Christmas break. The "Vigilante Committee" was founded in 1941, serving as a grand jury for the Freshman Court. During the 1940s, the Freshman Rules fell out of favor as returning World War II veterans refused to participate. The rules were reinstated in the 1950s, once those students had graduated. In 1956, the Student Council created "Lex Ultimo," a new organization to write and enforce the Freshman rules alongside the Freshman Court. The 28 members of Lex Ultimo included 14 members of the Student Council and the 14 Freshman Court Judges, all of whom wore a uniform of red hats with a white shield and a gavel and paddle. Lex Ultimo drafted the year's rules at the first meeting of the year, known as the "blood meeting." The organization was also responsible for freshman of freshman orientation, pep rallies, freshman cheering sections, and the annual pushball contests.

The popularity of the freshman rules waned in the late 1950s and early 1960s, as the Freshman Court met only once per year and punished only the most egregious offenders. The Freshman Court ceased to function altogether in 1959. In 1960, the Student Council passed a resolution to end the tradition, but they continued. In 1962 the Student Council held hearings on ways to reform the rules, limiting their scope to requiring name badges and dinks, while adding summer reading lists and a campus-wide "big brother-little brother" mentorship system.

== Academic ceremonies ==
The college holds several formal academic ceremonies each year. One of the oldest is the baccalaureate ceremony, which is held in conjunction with the graduation exercises. The first baccalaureate ceremonies were held in 1859 by Washington College and 1865 by Jefferson College. Early graduation ceremonies were week-long affairs, with large meals, college dances, and debates held by the literary societies. The tradition of recognizing 50-year graduates as members of the "Old Guard" began in 1930, and became organized as an official alumni group in the 1950s. The procession of seniors to the graduation site is led by the longest-tenured faculty member, who carries a ceremonial mace cared from the original wooden column of McMillan Hall. The tradition of the "Spoon of Knowledge", a large wooden spoon passed each year by the graduating senior class to the junior class to symbolize the "spooning" of knowledge to the younger class, dates to 1865. The spoon is covered with silver disks bearing the name of the each graduating class. The tradition was placed on hiatus in 1968 and revived in 1993 with the carving of a new spoon.

Founder's Day, first held in 1903, was an event for freshmen commemorating college founders John McMillan, Thaddeus Dod, Joseph Smith. The tradition went on hiatus during the 1970s and was finally retired in 2005. As a replacement ceremony, Convocation, held at the beginning of the school year, is open to all members of the college community. To commemorate the first Convocation in 2005, the bell in Old Main was refurbished and rang for the first time in decades. At Matriculation, freshmen are officially welcomed to the college community in a ceremony where they sign the college's mission statement, receive their official college pin, and learn the college songs and yells.
