= Boyd Crumrine Patterson =

American mathematician

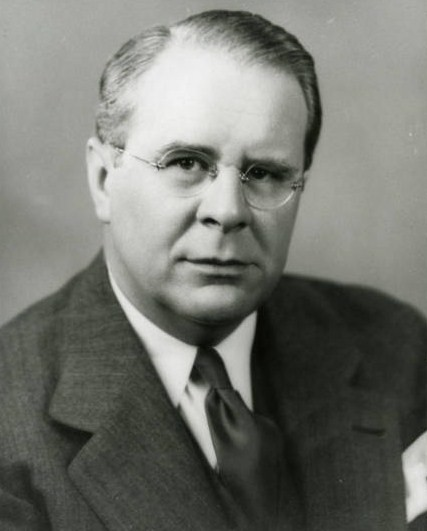

9th President of Washington & Jefferson College
- In office March 24, 1950 – June 30, 1970
- Preceded by: James Herbert Case, Jr.
- Succeeded by: Howard J. Burnett

Personal details
- Born: April 23, 1902 McKeesport, Pennsylvania
- Died: July 12, 1988 (aged 86) Clinton, New York
- Spouse: Mary Eleanor Dennison
- Education: Washington & Jefferson College
- Profession: Professor

Boyd Crumrine Patterson was an American mathematician and the ninth president of Washington & Jefferson College.

== Life and career ==
Patterson was born in McKeesport, Pennsylvania, on April 23, 1902, and graduated from Washington and Jefferson College in 1923, completing his studies in three years. He was a member of the well-known Crumrine family of Washington County and a third-generation W&J graduate. His father, John P. Patterson, was a member of W&J's class of 1885; his grandfather, Boyd Crumrine, a noted local historian, was in Jefferson College's class of 1860. He was also a member of the Phi Kappa Psi fraternity.

For graduate study, Boyd went to Johns Hopkins University where he studied inversive geometry with Frank Morley. In 1926, he wrote a dissertation "Differential Invariants of Inversive Geometry" for his doctoral degree.

Patterson returned to Washington & Jefferson College as a member of the faculty from 1926 to 1927 before taking a mathematics professorship at Hamilton College. Continuing to collaborate with Morley, they co-wrote a paper on algebraic inversive invariants in 1930. In 1943, Patterson became the chair of the mathematics department at Hamilton.

In 1950, he returned to W&J to assume its presidency. In that position, he oversaw curriculum revisions, updated admissions standards, and generally enhanced Washington and Jefferson's reputation. All told, 17 buildings were constructed during Patterson's tenure, including the Phi Gamma Delta fraternity House, the Wilbur F. Henry Memorial Physical Education Center, ten Greek housing units in the center of campus, the U. Grant Miller Library, the Student Center, the Commons, and two new dormitories. The athletic fields also were improved. In 1952, the college's two war surplus barracks, Washington Hall and Jefferson Hall, were dismantled. During his presidency, the college's endowment expanded from $2.3 million to nearly $11 million.

On December 12, 1969, the Board of Trustees authorized the admission of women as undergraduate students, to be effective in September 1970. Dr. Patterson retired on June 30, 1970. He died of a stroke on July 12, 1988, in his home in Clinton, New York.

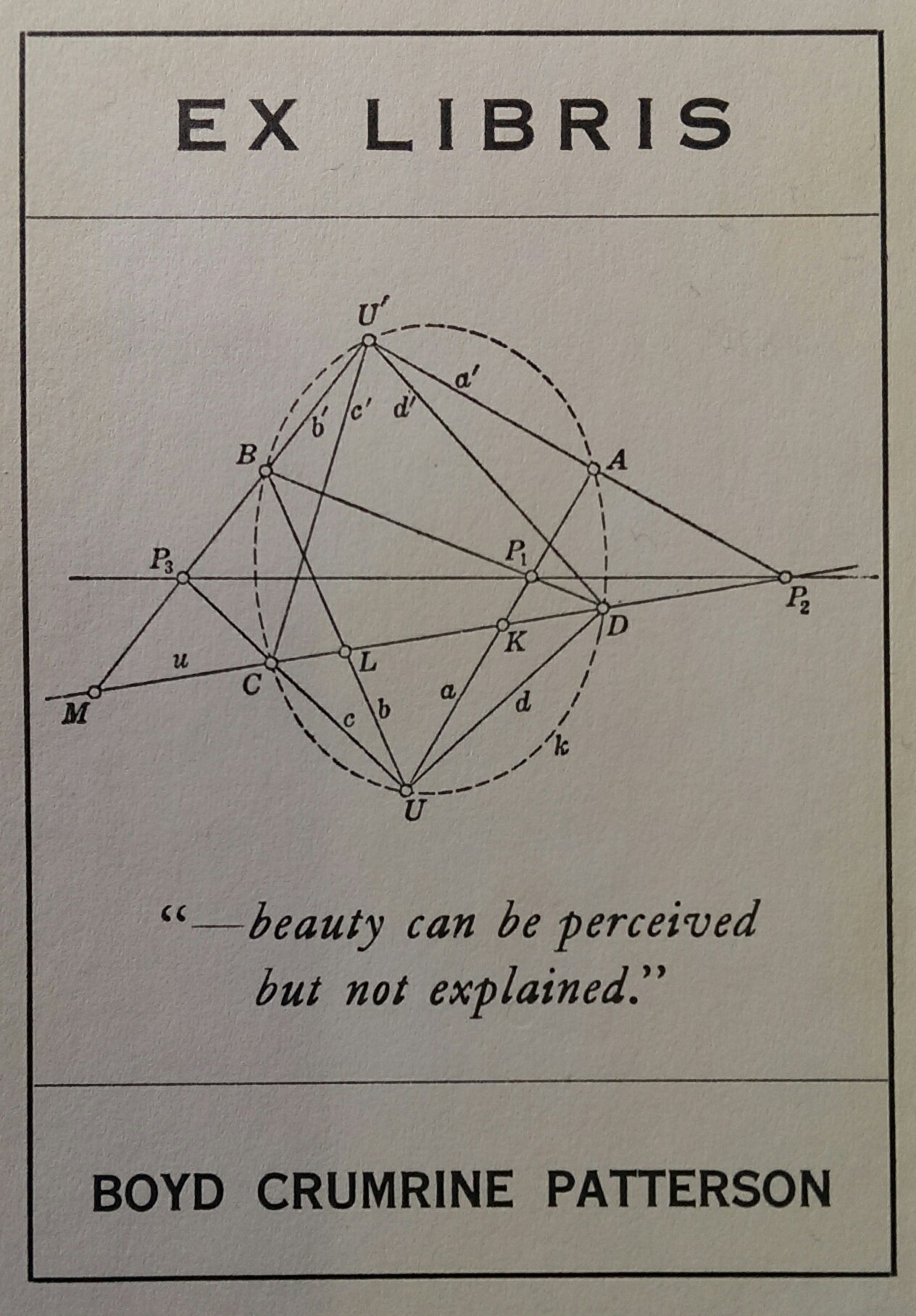
Ex Libris of Boyd Crumrine Patterson

== Works ==
- 1929: "On complex values of a real parameter", American Mathematical Monthly 36(7):376–9.
- 1930; "On algebraic inversive invariants", American Journal of Mathematics 52(2):413–24 (with Frank Morley)
- 1933: "The origins of the geometric principle of inversion", Isis 19(1):154–80.
- 1935: "The components of velocity and acceleration", American Mathematical Monthly 42(9): 554–7.
- 1937: Projective Geometry, John Wiley & Sons. Reviews:
- 1939: "The artificial arithmetik in decimals of Robert Jager 1651", Isis 31(1):25–31.
- 1941: "The Inversive Plane", American Mathematical Monthly 48: 589–99, doi:10.2307/2303867 MR 0006034

Academic offices
Preceded by James Herbert Case, Jr.	President of Washington and Jefferson College; 1950–1970	Succeeded by Howard J. Burnett
