= John Walker (industrialist) =

American industrialist (1843–1932)

- Born: November 23, 1843
- Died: June 23, 1932 (aged 88)
- Known for: Industrialist
- Spouse(s): Amelia Phipps (d. 1887); Susan Cooper Walker

John Walker (1843–1932) was a prominent iron and steel industrialist in Pittsburgh, Pennsylvania during the early 20th century. He was born in Allegheny, Pennsylvania, now known as Pittsburgh's North Side. His father was a Scottish immigrant. He was a boyhood friend of Andrew Carnegie and Henry Clay Frick; all three of them grew up to be steel industrialists.

Walker founded Wilson, Walker & Co. in 1872, a company producing bar iron, railroad car forgings, and rail plates. In 1886, the company was bought by Carnegie, Phipps & Company and Walker became chairman of the board. As a director of Frick Coke Co., he sided with Frick over Carnegie in their clash to control American steel production. Carnegie offered Walker a $3,000,000 share of Carnegie Steel to change sides; Walker refused to double-cross his friend Frick. Walker retired in 1888.

Walker lived in a mansion on Western Avenue in Pittsburgh's North Side neighborhood.

At Walker's death in 1932, he was one of the last surviving steel masters in Pittsburgh. When Walker died, his family donated his private library to Washington & Jefferson College in Washington, Pennsylvania. The entire library was installed in the Thompson Library exactly as it had been—including an extensive collection of books, bookcases, pictures, furniture, chandeliers, and stained-glass lamps. When the U. Grant Miller Library replaced Thompson Library as the college library in 1965, the room was moved to the new facility, again exactly as it had been during Walker's life. The room is generally used for study and reading.
