= East Washington Historic District =

Historic district in Pennsylvania, United States

- U.S. National Register of Historic Places
- U.S. Historic district
- Washington County History & Landmarks Foundation Landmark
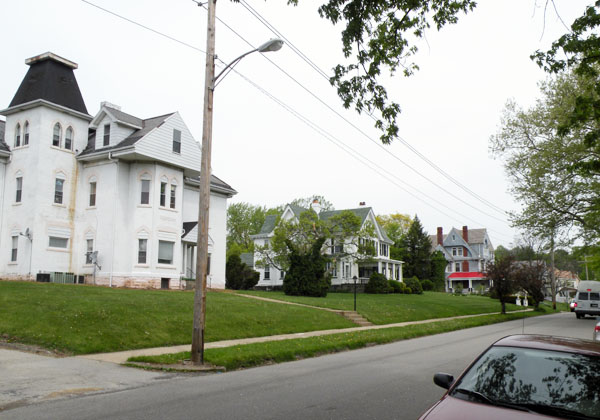
- Looking down South Wade Avenue

- Location within Pennsylvania Location within the United States
- Location: Roughly North, East, and Wade Aves., Wheeling, Beau, and Chestnut Sts., East Washington, Pennsylvania
- Coordinates: 40°10′18″N 80°14′4″W
- Area: 36.5 acres (14.8 ha)
- Built: 1875
- Architectural style: Colonial Revival, Queen Anne, Shingle Style
- NRHP reference No.: 84000547
- Added to NRHP: November 15, 1984

The East Washington Historic District is a historic district in East Washington, Pennsylvania that is listed on the National Register of Historic Places. It is designated as a historic district by the Washington County History & Landmarks Foundation.

In 1984, the Washington County History and Landmarks Foundation succeeded in having a section of East Washington consisting of 120 Victorian houses added to the National Register of Historic Places. Washington & Jefferson College was opposed to the designation, but filed an objection too late in the proceedings. College President Howard J. Burnett said that the district "was structured to prevent expansion of the college." At issue was the college's plan to expand eastward towards the Wade Avenue area, a plan that was developed in the 1968 "Master Plan." Since then, the college has had a policy of purchasing homes in that area when they become available. The college has purchased and demolished a number of buildings listed in the historic district, including 308, 314 and 322 E. Wheeling Street, which made way for the Burnett Center. A 140-year-old farm house at 137 South Wade Street was acquired by the college in 1977 after being vacant for several years and moved to a new location. As of 1995, the college owned about 30 properties listed in the historic district.
