= The Burnett Center =

Academic building at Washington & Jefferson College

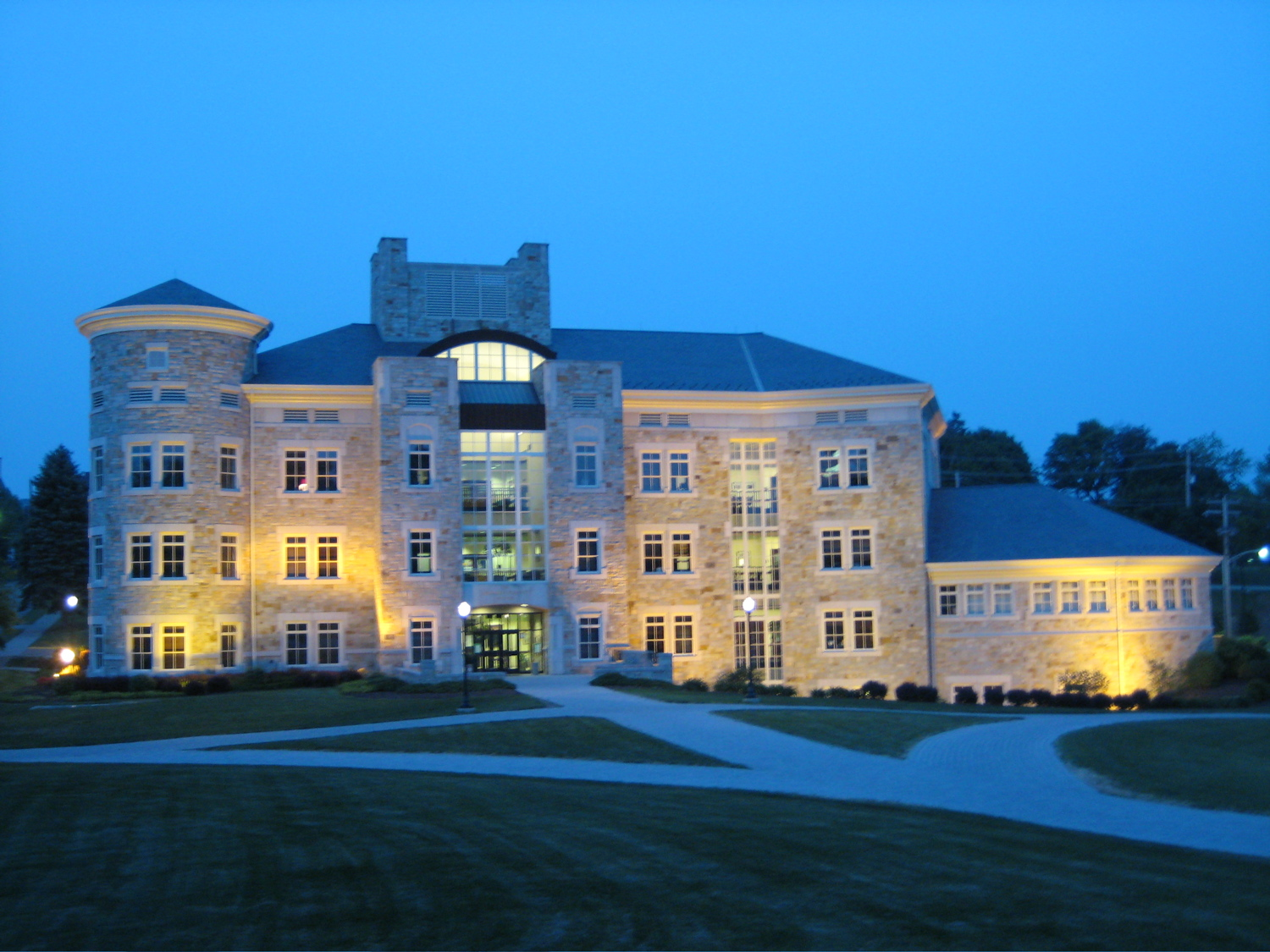
- The Burnett Center at night
- Interactive map of the The Burnett Center area

General information
- Type: Academic
- Location: Washington, Pennsylvania
- Coordinates: 40°10′11.7″N 80°14′17.7″W
- Construction started: December 1999
- Completed: June 2001
- Inaugurated: October 2001
- Cost: 12.8 million

Technical details
- Floor count: 3 floors
- Floor area: 57,000 sq ft (5,300 m^{2})

Design and construction
- Architects: MacLachlan, Cornelius & Filoni
- Main contractor: Landau Building Company

The Howard J. Burnett Center, also known as The Burnett Center, is an academic building on the campus of Washington & Jefferson College. This building, named after former President Howard J. Burnett, was completed in 2001 at a cost of $12.8 million. It houses the Departments of Economics and Business, Modern Languages, and Education.

It features 12 classrooms, several circular seminar rooms, computer labs, and the Yost Auditorium. Situated on the northeast border of campus, The Burnett Center is a cornerstone building. The exterior is constructed of granite and limestone, and a grassy plaza and fountain decorate the grounds outside. The interior features a large atrium, large vertical ribbon window assemblies, and cast iron fleur-de-lis balusters from a former residence hall. The architecture and masonry work won several national awards.

== Facilities ==
The Burnett Center houses the Departments of Economics and Business, Modern Languages, and Education. The twelve multimedia classrooms come in sizes and styles, allowing for a flexible teaching space, moveable seating, and outlets for laptop computers. At various times, it has also housed the entrepreneurial studies program, a small business institute, and an office of lifelong learning. The Yost Auditorium is an 84-seat lecture hall. The seminar rooms, located in the tower structure of the left side of the building, feature 16-seat octagonal tables. The first floor has computer labs near the main entrance. The Burnett Center also has faculty and student lounges, a faculty kitchenette, and a curriculum library.

The building stands three stories tall and has 57,000 square feet (5,300 m^{2}) of floorspace. It is constructed of granite, limestone, slate, and copper, which is intended to match the older buildings on campus. The tower element on the left side of the building is intended to match the most prominent building on campus, Old Main. The 30-degree bend at one end created a "cornerstone" effect on the campus' northeast property line. A false chimney houses mechanical equipment. The entrance plaza includes a fountain and a grassed bowl area in the lower plaza. The interior of the Burnett Center consists of cherry wood trim and doors, veneer plaster, wool carpet, and cove lighting. The railings include cast iron fleur-de-lis balusters from Hays Hall, the first dormitory on campus that was demolished in 1994. The first floor has atrium spaces and a main staircase. The large vertical ribbon window assemblies provide a view of the rest of campus.

== Construction and design ==
To prepare the site for construction, the college acquired a number of demolition permits from the zoning board, including permits allowing for the demolition of several houses, including 314, 322 and 330 East Wheeling Street, which were part of the East Washington Historic District. The permits also authorized the demolition of houses at 288, 290, 300, and 308 East Wheeling Street, as well as 218, 218 1/2, 220, 290, and 300 Grant Street. At the end of July, the zoning board issued a stay on those permits after hearing objections from the Washington County History and Landmarks Foundation. By 1995, the permits were restored and the construction was able to proceed.

Plans and fundraising for the building were performed by President Brian C. Mitchell, who served as president of the college from 1998 to 2004. The building is named after Mitchell's predecessor, Howard J. Burnett, who served as President from 1970 to 1998. Construction of the building, which cost $12.8 million, ran from December 1999 to June 2001. It was dedicated in October 2001. General contracting services were performed by The Landau Building Company. The building was designed by MacLachlan, Cornelius & Filoni, Inc. That firm was awarded the Louis I. Kahn Citation from the American School & University 2002 Design Competition, calling for Burnett "a striking edifice for the pursuit of academic excellence. The construction materials—granite, limestone, slate, and copper—create substantial quality.” The masonry sub-contractor Harris Masonry won the Excellence in Craftmanship Award from the Master Builders’ Association, saying that “The Weymouth Granite Ashlar veneer greatly enhances the traditional campus architecture of Washington & Jefferson College. The art of stone cutting and trimming rises to the highest level of beauty and reflects truly superb craftsmanship,” The masonry work also won the 2001 IMI Golden Trowel Award for "Excellence in Masonry Design and Construction." Griffin Interior created custom furniture for the building, including custom-built radiused desks for the computer rooms
