= Hays Hall =

Coordinates: 40.171479°N 80.242810°W

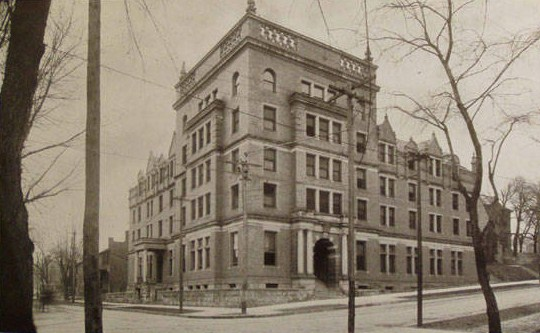
- Hays Hall, circa 1913
- Interactive map of the Hays Hall area

General information
- Construction started: February 28, 1901
- Completed: June 23, 1903
- Demolished: 1994
- Cost: $95,977.59

Technical details
- Floor count: 5 floors

Design and construction
- Architect: Frederick J. Osterling

Hays Hall was a residence hall at Washington & Jefferson College. The architectural work was performed by Frederick J. Osterling and it was named after President George P. Hays. Construction was completed in 1903 and the new "fireproof" building was opened to Washington & Jefferson Academy students. Rooms were arranged in a suite style, with communal bathrooms on each floor, and shower baths on the 5th floor. In 1912, the Academy closed and Hays Hall was used by Washington & Jefferson College students. At various times, Hays Hall housed the bookstore and a dining hall. By 1968, Hays Hall had deteriorated to the point where it no longer able to house students, but the bookstore remained. In 1982, the building was declared a fire hazard and closed for all uses. While various efforts sought to renovate or restore Hays Hall, including a push to have it named a historical landmark, Hays Hall was demolished in 1994.

== History ==
=== Construction ===
On February 28, 1901, the Trustees of Washington & Jefferson College purchased a plot of land on the corner of Beau and College Streets from James H. Hopkins for the construction of a new dormitory to house students for the Washington & Jefferson Academy. The new "fire-proof" building, named Hays Hall after President George P. Hays, contained three floors of dormitories. It was designed by famed Pittsburgh architect Frederick J. Osterling. It opened for use on January 8, 1902 and was completed on June 23, 1903, with a total construction cost of $95,977.59. All told, Hays Hall could house 60 students, plus 6 faculty members and the Academy Principal's family. The first floor contained a large stairway, reception hall, a dining hall and kitchen facility capable of feeding 150, and an office area. The amenities included steam heat and electric lighting. The floors were arranged in a 2-room suite style, with each student having his own room plus a communal study area. Each floor had two communal bathrooms, with three shower baths on the 5th floor.

=== Use by the College ===
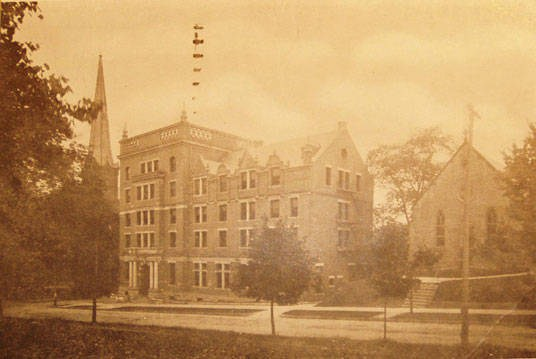
Hayes Hall in 1912.

When the Academy was closed in 1912, Hays Hall was used as College's first dormitory, housing 80 college students. President James D. Moffat planned to use Hays Hall as the beginning of a school-wide dormitory system, as this was becoming standard in colleges at the time. Upperclassmen were given the first opportunity to acquire rooms. Room and board was "furnished to students as near to cost as possible," which amounted to $5 to $8 a month in 1912. "Table board" cost $4 a week. The affairs of the dormitory were regulated by an elected student "senate." The rooms were furnished and linens were supplied by the college for free. Miss Sadie Hewitt was employed as the "House Mother" and took care of the students. In 1915, residence in Hays Hall was restricted to freshmen and the faculty compelled out-of-town students to take rooms there, a college first. Renovations were made in the 1924, including a redecoration of the rooms with new carpets and furniture. The Beau Street wing on the first floor contained a soda fountain.

In 1925, the dorm lobby piano was removed by the Christian Life Service League, who had wanted to use it for their services. Hays Hall residents erupted in protest, arguing that the League had no need for the piano, since there was one in the Old Main Chapel. Even Miss Hewitt weighed in on the controversy, saying that the "lack of a piano encourages gambling and other violations of the rules since the piano is, especially to non frat men, frequently an only source of pleasure." In 1926, the League voted to return the piano back to Hays.

During the increased enrollment following World War II, the dining room was moved to Old Main and the college bookstore moved to that space from the Administration Building. In 1948, tile floors were installed in showers and the interior was repainted. The exterior woodwork was also painted. Following the enrollment spike, the dining hall returned to Hays Hall and the bookstore moved back to the Administration Building.

=== Partial closing and demolition ===
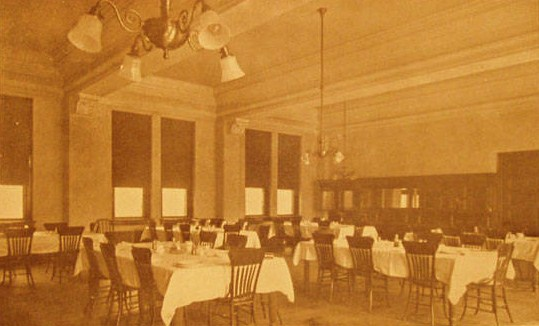
The Hays Hall dining room

By 1968, Hays Hall had deteriorated to the point where it no longer able to house students. The plaster walls had become difficult to maintain and the plumbing and heating units had fallen into disrepair. The 4th and 5th floor had fallen the furthest into disrepair. On February 1, 1968, the living quarters of the building were closed. Student opinion was mixed on the decision. Some students has been unhappy with the inconvenient shower facilities and the echo-filled hallways, while other students expressed fondness for the building. To replace the lost living space, the college entered into an agreement with the nearby George Washington Hotel, whereby the college rented the entire 5th and 6th floors as a dormitory for three years. The Hays Hall furniture moved there as well. These floors contained 25 rooms each, which was enough for the 86 former residents of Hays Hall, the House Mother, and four floor proctors. The dining hall moved to newly completed The Commons in March 1968. The infirmary remained, with the old dining hall converted into the Bookstore. During its time as a dormitory, it was home to 4,000 freshmen.

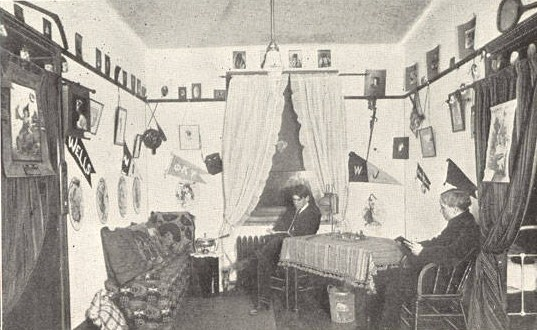
A suite of rooms in Hays Hall

At the time, the possibility of renovating the Hays Hall remained open. Some plans called for the opening of the first three floors at a later date, converting the building to house office space, or expanding the Bookstore to encompass more of the first floor. Another campus modification plan called for the closing of Lincoln Street and widening College Street, which would require the full demolition of Hays Hall. In 1982, after years of neglect by the college and modernization of the fire code, the building was considered to be a fire hazard. The central staircase was deemed especially hazardous, as it would operate as a flue in the event of a fire, which would quickly turn the building into a "furnace." It was closed in 1982, with amorphous plans to refurbish it at a later date.

During the 1980s and early 1990s, plans to renovate the building periodically resurfaced. Other discussions considered having the building designated as a historic landmark. These plans never materialized due to the costs involved. Hays Hall was demolished in the summer and fall of 1994. The orate ironwork in the lobby was preserved and later used in The Burnett Center. Following demolition, the plot remained a green space for several years.
