= Howard J. Burnett =

American academic administrator (1929–2019)

Howard Burnett
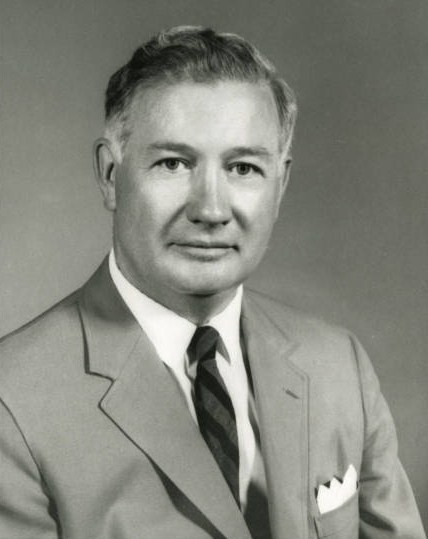

10th President of Washington & Jefferson College
- In office July 1, 1970 – June 30, 1998
- Preceded by: Boyd Crumrine Patterson
- Succeeded by: Brian C. Mitchell

Personal details
- Born: Howard Jerome Burnett; October 14, 1929 Holyoke, Massachusetts, U.S.
- Died: June 16, 2019 (aged 89) Mt. Lebanon, Pennsylvania, U.S.
- Education: Amherst College (BA); Queen's College, Oxford (MA); New York University (PhD)

Howard Jerome Burnett (October 14, 1929 – June 16, 2019) was a president of Washington & Jefferson College.

== Life and career ==
Burnett, a native of Holyoke, Massachusetts, earned a B.A. degree in political science from Amherst College in 1952; he earned magna cum laude honors and was a member of Phi Beta Kappa. As a Rhodes Scholar, he studied at Oxford University, earning B.A. and M.A. degrees in philosophy, politics, and economics. Burnett earned his Ph.D. in government and international relations from New York University in 1965.

Prior to entering academia, Burnett gained experience in business and served in the military. Burnett was an assistant professor of government and assistant to the president at Corning Community College from 1962 through 1964. He served as president of the College Center of the Finger Lakes from 1964 through 1970. He was awarded an honorary degree of Doctor of Laws by Ithaca College 1965.

Burnett took office as president of Washington & Jefferson College on July 1, 1970; he was officially inaugurated on April 3, 1971. During that year, W&J admitted its first female students, hired its first female faculty members, and hired a woman to be Associate Dean of Student Personnel. The school also adopted a new academic calendar to include intersession.

To celebrate the bicentennial of W&J's founding, Burnett spearheaded the "Bicentennial Development Program," which resulted in the construction of three new buildings on campus: the Dieter-Porter Life Science Building, the Olin Fine Arts Center, and the Rossin Campus Center. During Burnett's tenure, the college acquired and renovated the W&J Alumni House, restored and renovated Thompson Memorial and McMillan Halls, added several residence facilities, and opened the Student Resource Center. The college expanded its academic programs to include the Entrepreneurial Studies Program, the Freshman Forum, and cooperative international education programs with institutions in England, Colombia and Russia, and student enrollment grew from 830 in 1970 to 1,100 in 1998. Burnett retired as president on June 30, 1998.

== Personal life ==
He was first married to Barbara Ransohoff, sister of producer Martin Ransohoff. They had two daughters, Lee Berman and Sue Petito and one son, Mark. His second marriage was to Maryann dePalma in 1994, who survived him. The Howard J. Burnett Center at Washington & Jefferson is named after him.

Academic offices
Preceded by Boyd Crumrine Patterson	President of Washington and Jefferson College; 1970–1998	Succeeded by Brian C. Mitchell
