= William Mather Lewis =

American teacher, university president, politician and government official

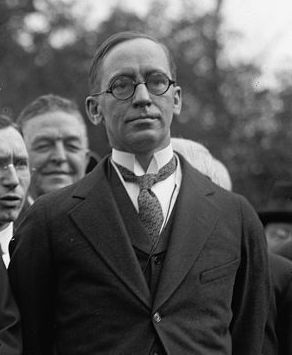
- Lewis, 1923

Mayor of Lake Forest, Illinois
- In office 1915–1917

President of George Washington University
- In office 1923–1927
- Preceded by: William Miller Collier
- Succeeded by: Cloyd H. Marvin

President of Lafayette College
- In office 1927–1945
- Preceded by: Donald B. Prentice (acting)
- Succeeded by: Ralph Cooper Hutchison

Personal details
- Born: March 24, 1878 Howell, Michigan, U.S.
- Died: November 11, 1945 (aged 67) Colebrook, Connecticut, U.S.
- Spouse: Ruth Durand (m. 1906)
- Children: 1
- Education: Lake Forest College (AB); Illinois College (AM); University of Berlin (Ph.D.)

William Mather Lewis (March 24, 1878 – November 11, 1945) was an American teacher, university president, local politician, and a state and national government official. He was mayor of Lake Forest, Illinois from 1915 to 1917, President of George Washington University from 1923 to 1927 and the President of Lafayette College from 1927 to 1945.

== Early life ==
Lewis was born in Howell, Michigan on March 24, 1878. His father was Rev. James Lewis, minister of the Howell church from 1875 to 1882, and his mother was Mary Farrand.

== Education ==
Lewis attended Knox College. Lewis received an A.B. from Lake Forest College in 1900, and an A.M. from Illinois College in 1902. Later, he would receive his Ph.D. from the University of Berlin. He was a member of Phi Delta Theta.

== Career ==
=== Lake Forest ===
Lewis was briefly principal of Whipple Academy, Jacksonville (a preparatory school of Illinois College), before returning to Lake Forest to be head of the department of oratory and debate at Lake Forest Academy for three years. In 1905 he became headmaster at the academy, resigning in 1913 to travel and study in Europe. He was mayor of Lake Forest, Illinois from 1915 to 1917.

=== State and national roles ===
Lewis was field secretary of the Navy League of the United States in the Midwest in 1915.

During World War I, he was executive secretary of the National Committee of Patriotic Societies. Lewis was director of the savings division of the United States Treasury Department and chief of educational service for the U.S. Chamber of Commerce from 1921 to 1923.

Because of his earlier work during World War I, Lewis was appointed by Governor Arthur James as the director of the Pennsylvania Selective Service System (organising "the draft"), which he did without pay from September 1940 until he stepped down in November 1941 since it detracted from his duties as president of Lafayette College.

=== University career ===
Lewis was President of George Washington University from June 1923 to 1927, and President of Lafayette College from March 1927 until retiring in July 1945, shortly before his death. He was succeeded by Ralph Cooper Hutchison. During his tenure at Lafayette College, he invited fifty-two people from the United States and France to establish the American Friends of Lafayette.

=== Other ===
Lewis was a contributor to the Encyclopædia Britannica. He was awarded a patent for a milk bottle holder in 1918.

== Personal life ==
He married Ruth Durand in Lake Forest on December 20, 1906 and they had a daughter, Sarah Durand Lewis Betts Hale (1907–2006). They had a summer home in Colebrook, Connecticut, where they later lived.

They spent more than a year travelling and studying in Europe, including England and Berlin, from June 1913 to October 1914. This enabled Lewis to obtain a Ph.D. from the University of Berlin.

== Death ==
Lewis died from a heart attack while driving near his home on November 11, 1945. His widow Ruth died in 1953.

== Books ==
- Lewis, William Mather. Selected Readings from the Most Popular Novels. Hinds and Noble, 1903.
- Lewis, William Mather. The Voices of Our Leaders. Hinds, Hayden & Elderedge, Inc., 1917
- Lewis, William Mather. From a College Platform: Addresses. Dial Press, Inc., 1932.

Academic offices
Preceded by Cloyd H. Marvin	President of George Washington University; 1923-1927	Succeeded by William Miller Collier
Preceded by John Henry MacCracken	President of Lafayette College; 1927–1945	Succeeded by Ralph Cooper Hutchison
