= William E. Slemmons =

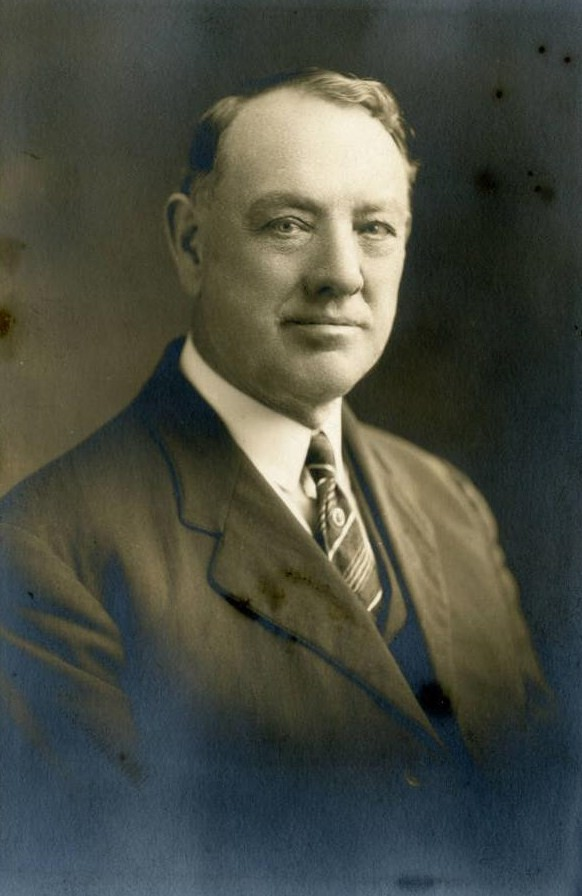
- Born: December 1, 1855; Cadiz, Ohio
- Died: September 4, 1939 (aged 83); Washington, Pennsylvania
- Education: Princeton University; Western Theological Seminary

Ecclesiastical career
- Church: Presbyterian
- Congregations: Mercer Second Presbyterian Church (Mercer County, Pennsylvania)
- Offices held: President pro temp. of Washington & Jefferson College

William E. Slemmons was a prominent 19th century clergyman and academic in Western Pennsylvania.

Slemmons was born in Cadiz, Ohio, on December 1, 1855. He graduated from Princeton University in 1877 and from the Western Theological Seminary (now Pittsburgh Theological Seminary) in 1887. He earned a Doctor of Divinity from Grove City College in 1900 and W&J awarded him an honorary Doctor of Laws degree in 1936.

He gave the Master's Oration at the Princeton commencement in 1880, a speech entitled "Literary and Academic Exclusiveness." The New York Times called it an "extremely practical view of the caste feeling existing between high institutions of learning and the common every-day world."

In 1894, while serving as a pastor in Mercer Second Presbyterian Church, Slemmons was a delegate for the Pennsylvania Synod to the 106th General Assembly of the Presbyterian Church in the United States. He served on the Church Erection Committee and was involved in a protest against a declaration against a resolution from the "Committee on Temperance" declaring "no political party has the right to expect the support of Christian men so long as the party...refuses to put itself on record against the saloon."

He served as President Pro Tem. of Washington & Jefferson College from May 1918 to June 1919. He served as a trustee of the board of trustees for 38 years and on W&J's faculty as adjunct professor of Biblical Literature from 1919 to 1935. He retired from full-time teaching in 1935, but he continued teaching two philosophy courses until his death on September 4, 1939, at the age of 83.

Academic offices
Preceded by Frederick W. Hinitt	Interim President of Washington and Jefferson College; 1918–1919	Succeeded by Samuel Charles Black
