= East Washington, Pennsylvania =

Borough in Pennsylvania, US

East Washington
- Borough
- The Borough of East Washington
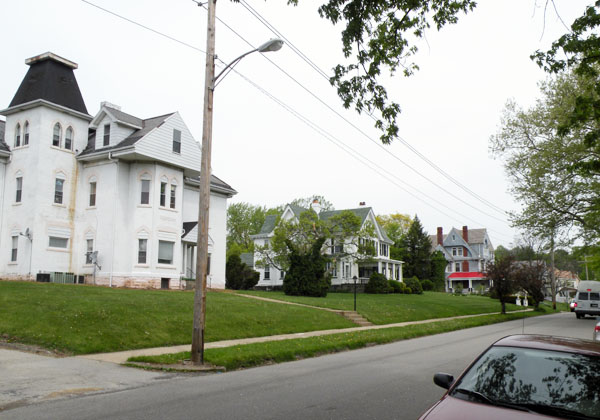
- Historic homes on South Wade Avenue

- Location of East Washington in Washington County, Pennsylvania.

- Location of East Washington in Pennsylvania
- Coordinates: 40°10′26″N 80°14′2″W
- Country: United States
- State: Pennsylvania
- County: Washington
- Established: 1892

Government
  - Mayor: Demond Nixon (R)

Area
  - Total: 0.45 sq mi (1.16 km^{2})
  - Land: 0.45 sq mi (1.16 km^{2})
  - Water: 0 sq mi (0.00 km^{2})

Population (2020)
  - Total: 1,853
  - Density: 4,128/sq mi (1,593.9/km^{2})
- Time zone: UTC-4 (EST)
  - Summer (DST): UTC-5 (EDT)
- ZIP code: 15301
- Area code: 724
- FIPS code: 42-22016
- Website: www.eastwash.com

East Washington is a borough of Washington County, Pennsylvania, United States. The population was 1,858 at the time of the 2020 census.

== History ==
The East Washington Historic District was listed on the National Register of Historic Places in 1984.

== Geography ==
East Washington is located at 40°10′26″N 80°14′2″W (40.173799, -80.233945).

According to the United States Census Bureau, the borough has a total area of 0.5 square miles (1.3 km^{2}), all land.

== Demographics ==
Historical population
Census	Pop.	Note	%±
1900	1,051		—
1910	1,300		23.7%
1920	1,561		20.1%
1930	1,859		19.1%
1940	2,106		13.3%
1950	2,304		9.4%
1960	2,483		7.8%
1970	2,198		−11.5%
1980	2,241		2.0%
1990	2,126		−5.1%
2000	1,930		−9.2%
2010	2,234		15.8%
2020	1,853		−17.1%
2025 (est.)	1,814	▼	−2.1%

At the time of the 2000 census there were 1,930 people, 903 households, and 492 families living in the borough.

The population density was 4,225.3 people per square mile (1,631.4 people/km^{2}). There were 983 housing units at an average density of 2,152.1 per square mile (830.9/km^{2}).

The racial makeup of the borough was 94.04% White, 4.25% African American, 0.21% Native American, 0.36% Asian, 0.10% Pacific Islander, 0.05% from other races, and 0.98% from two or more races. Hispanic or Latino of any race were 0.21%.

There were 903 households, 23.4% had children under the age of eighteen living with them; 42.9% were married couples living together, 9.1% had a female householder with no husband present, and 45.5% were non-family households. 38.2% of the households documented were one-person households and 12.2% were one-person households with residents who were aged sixty-five or older.

The average household size was 2.14 and the average family size was 2.82.

The age distribution was 20.3% of residents who were under the age of eighteen, 10.1% who were aged eighteen to twenty-four, 28.9% who were aged twenty-five to forty-four, 25.7% who were aged forty-five to sixty-four, and 15.0% who were aged sixty-five or older. The median age was forty years.

For every one hundred females, there were 90.7 males. For every one hundred females who were aged eighteen or older, there were 84.4 males.

The median household income was $41,319 and the median family income was $65,625. Males had a median income of $47,266 compared with that of $27,414 for females.

The per capita income for the borough was $32,852.

Approximately 5.4% of families and 9.8% of the population were living below the poverty line, including 8.4% of those who were under the age of eighteen; however, no residents over the age of sixty-five were living in poverty.

== Education ==
The school district is the Washington School District.

Portions of the campus of Washington & Jefferson College are in East Washington.
