= Samuel Charles Black =

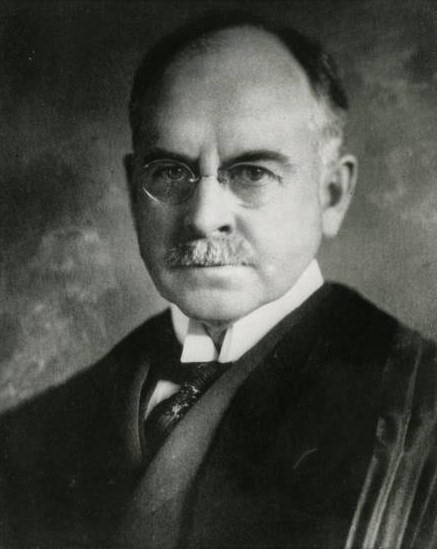

5th President of Washington & Jefferson College
- In office April 18, 1919 – July 25, 1921
- Preceded by: William E. Slemmons (acting); Frederick W. Hinitt
- Succeeded by: Simon Strousse Baker

Personal details
- Born: September 6, 1869 Monticello, Iowa
- Died: July 25, 1921 (aged 51) Denver, Colorado
- Resting place: Clarinda, Iowa
- Education: Parsons College
- Profession: Academic administrator

Samuel Charles Black was the fifth president of Washington & Jefferson College.

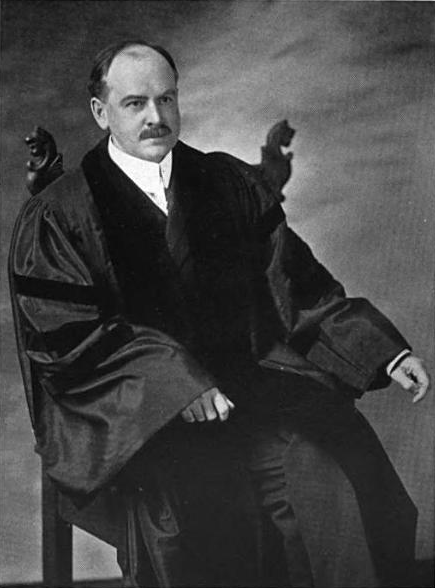
Photo of President Black published in his book Plain Answers to Religious Questions Modern Men Are Asking.

Black was born on September 6, 1869, at Monticello, Iowa and graduated from Parsons College. He was elected as the fifth President of Washington & Jefferson College on April 18, 1919, and was inaugurated October 22, 1919. By the spring of 1920, the college had the largest enrollment in any one year during its history, increasing from the low point during the World War I years to 368 men freshmen. Black took leave of the college for summer of 1921 to marry. While on a honeymoon tour of national parks in Colorado, he became sick and died in Denver, Colorado on July 25, 1921. He was buried in Clarinda, Iowa, the home of his parents.

== Bibliography ==
- Black, Samuel Charles (1910). Plain Answers to Religious Questions Modern Men Are Asking. Philadelphia: The Westminster Press. p. 203.

== See also ==
- Washington & Jefferson College
- President of Washington & Jefferson College

Academic offices
Preceded by William E. Slemmons (Interim)	President of Washington and Jefferson College; 1919–1921	Succeeded by Simon Strousse Baker
