= James Herbert Case Jr. =

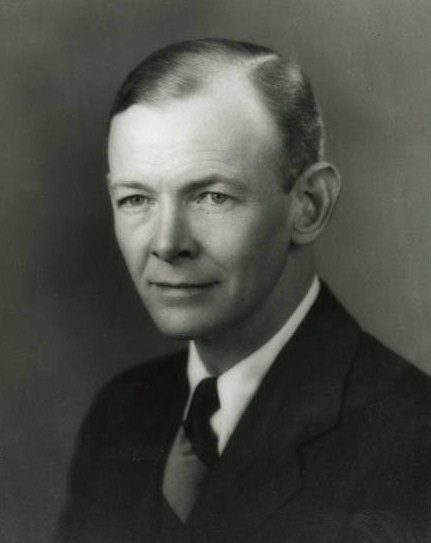

12th President of Bard College
- In office March 25, 1950 – 1960
- Preceded by: Edward C. Fuller
- Succeeded by: Reamer Kline

8th President of Washington & Jefferson College
- In office May 4, 1946 – March 25, 1950
- Preceded by: Ralph Cooper Hutchinson
- Succeeded by: Boyd Crumrine Patterson

Personal details
- Born: October 26, 1906 Plainfield, New Jersey, U.S.
- Died: July 11, 1965 (aged 58) New York, New York, U.S.
- Education: Princeton University

James Herbert Case Jr. (1906–1965) was the 8th president of Washington & Jefferson College and the 12th President of Bard College.

== Life and career ==
Case was born on October 26, 1906, in Plainfield, New Jersey He graduated from Princeton University in 1929 and served with the United States Navy Later, he served as secretary of Brown University.

He was elected president of Washington & Jefferson College on May 4, 1946, and inaugurated October 25, 1946. Fall 1946 saw the largest student body on record, 1047, with 75% of the students veterans of World War II The college added a Division of Engineering in the former Catholic Church on the corner of Wheeling and South Lincoln Streets. On October 29, 1949, the college dedicated Mellon and Upperclass Dormitories. In June 1949, the Board of Trustees granted Case a one-year leave of absence to study the problems of small, independent, liberal arts colleges. On March 25, 1950, before the end of his leave, he resigned to take the presidency of Bard College.

He died in New York Hospital on July 11, 1965, after a long illness.

== See also ==
- Washington & Jefferson College
- President of Washington & Jefferson College

Academic offices
| Preceded by Ralph Cooper Hutchinson | President of Washington and Jefferson College; 1946–1949 | Succeeded by Boyd Crumrine Patterson |
