= Simon Strousse Baker =

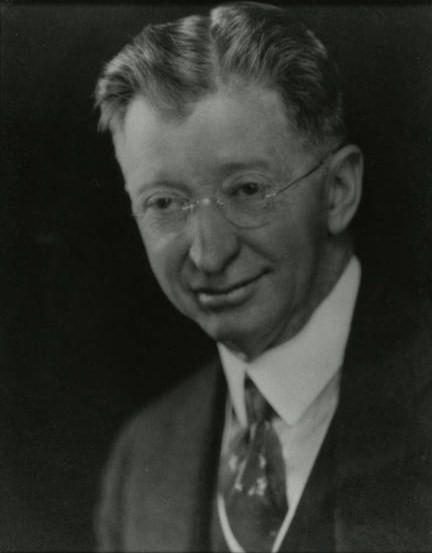

6th President of Washington & Jefferson College
- In office January 26, 1922 – May 13, 1931; Acting: July 15, 1921 – January 26, 1922
- Preceded by: Samuel Charles Black
- Succeeded by: Ralph Cooper Hutchinson

Personal details
- Born: July 11, 1866 Amwell Township, Pennsylvania
- Died: October 10, 1932 (aged 66) Washington, Pennsylvania
- Education: Washington & Jefferson College; University of Pittsburgh
- Profession: Professor

Simon Strousse Baker (July 11, 1866 – October 10, 1932) was the 6th president of Washington & Jefferson College.

Baker, the great-great-grandson of Dr. Thaddeus Dod, the founder of Washington Academy, was born in Amwell Township, Pennsylvania on July 11, 1866. In 1892, he graduated from Washington & Jefferson College, where he played football and was a member of Phi Delta Theta. He earned a master's degree from W&J in 1912 and a Doctor of Laws degree from University of Pittsburgh in 1922. He enjoyed playing golf, taking long walks, and reading Greek, Roman and Early American history. He frequented "many a smart Pittsburgh club" and often took his wife to opera or theatre shows in Pittsburgh.

He worked for 25 years as an associate superintendent of Pittsburgh's schools. Baker served as acting president of Washington & Jefferson following the death of Dr. Black, and he was elected president in his own right on January 26, 1922. He was inaugurated on March 29, 1922. During his tenure, the college physical plant of the college underwent extensive renovation and modernization. Modern business methods were adopted and the endowment grew considerably. Also, the college experienced advances in academics.

He was sympathetic and well liked by the college's trustees and by "many a townsman." However, the student body felt that Baker was "autocratic" and held an "unfriendly attitude toward the student body as individuals." Specifically, students objected to his policies regarding campus garb and athletics. Baker defended himself, saying that the perceived ill-will towards students was unintentional and a misunderstanding. Nonetheless, the student body held a strike and general walkout on March 18, 1931.

Baker had hoped to complete his plans to build a Moffat Memorial building, a chemistry building, and a stadium before retiring. But, in light of the strike, he resigned on April 23, 1931, for health reasons and for "the good of the College." Baker had been in ill health since undergoing a serious operation in 1930. His health and temperament never recovered from the death of his only son, Lieut. Edward David Baker, an aviator who was shot down in France in 1918. The trustees accepted his resignation on May 13, 1931.

He committed suicide on October 10, 1932.

Academic offices
Preceded by Samuel Charles Black	President of Washington and Jefferson College; 1922–1931	Succeeded by Ralph Cooper Hutchinson
