= Ralph Cooper Hutchison =

American educator and missionary (1898–1966)

Ralph Cooper Hutchison Ph.D, D.D.
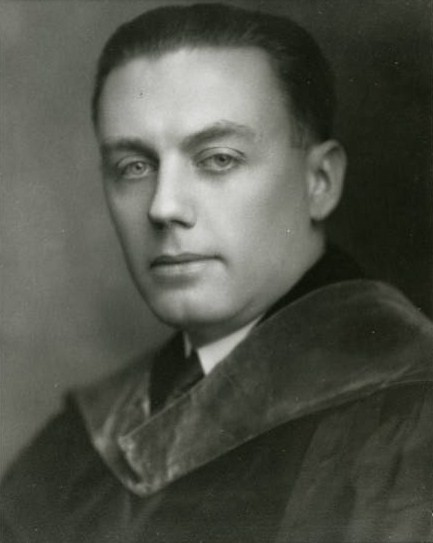

12th President of Lafayette College
- In office July 1945 – 1957
- Preceded by: William Mather Lewis
- Succeeded by: Guy Everett Snavely (acting); K. Roald Bergethon

7th President of Washington & Jefferson College
- In office November 13, 1931 – May 7, 1945
- Preceded by: Simon Strousse Baker
- Succeeded by: James Herbert Case Jr.

Personal details
- Born: February 27, 1898 Colorado
- Died: March 15, 1966 (aged 68) Bryn Mawr Hospital; Bryn Mawr, Pennsylvania
- Education: Lafayette College; Harvard University; University of Pennsylvania; Princeton Theological Seminary

Ralph Cooper Hutchison (February 27, 1898 – March 15, 1966) was president of Washington & Jefferson College and Lafayette College.

== Personal ==
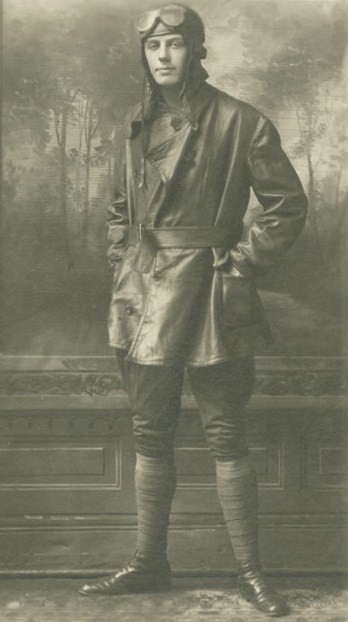
Hutchison was a naval air cadet in WWI.

Hutchison was born in Colorado on February 27, 1898. He attended Lafayette College, graduating in 1918. He served in the United States Naval Aviation Corps from May to November 1918. In 1919, following his service, Hutchison earned a master's degree from Harvard University. He attended Princeton Theological Seminary and was ordained as a preacher in the Presbyterian Church on April 21, 1922. He earned a PhD degree from the University of Pennsylvania in 1925. In 1930, Lafayette College conferred the Doctor of Divinity degree on Dr. Hutchison. He also worked for the Presbyterian Board of Christian Education and was a missionary in Persia. He served as Dean of the American University at Teheran, Iran, which he grew from a small high school to an institution of over 800. He returned to the United States when his wife contracted an "Asiatic malady."

== Presidency of Washington & Jefferson ==
Following the resignation of President Baker, Hutchison was unanimously elected the seventh president of Washington & Jefferson College on November 13, 1931; he was inaugurated on April 2, 1932, making him at 34 years old one of the youngest college presidents in the county. Following the contentious tenure of President Baker, Time Magazine noted that Hutchison "pleased nearly everyone." Hutchison, in his inaugural address, spoke out against the "false, materialistic doctrine" of going to college "because it pays." Instead, he encouraged students to appreciate the oldtime college education, which was "inviting only to those who did not set profit or wealth as their main objectives in life."

In an effort to strengthen the college's science department, Hutchison extended and expanded the southern portion of the campus, between East Wheeling and East Maiden Street. This included the construction of the Jesse W. Lazear Chemistry Building and the final absorption of The Seminary. The main seminary building was purchased, renovated, and re-dedicated as McIlvaine Hall. The John L. Stewart Memorial bell tower was added to McIlvaine Hall. The Reed residence on Maiden Street was purchased for use as a dormitory. The old Seminary dormitory facing East Maiden Street was razed to make more open space. Finally, the campus was re-oriented so the main entrance faced East Maiden Street, to allow tourists on U.S. Route 40 to see the college. The expanded campus was dedicated on October 26, 1940. In 1943, Hutchison was appointed Director of Civilian Defense for the Commonwealth of Pennsylvania, a cabinet-level position, by Governor Edward Martin for the duration of the war. He also served as director of the Pennsylvania United War Fund Program. President Hutchison resigned May 7, 1945.

== Presidency of Lafayette College ==
Hutchison served as president of Lafayette College, his alma mater, from 1945 to 1957.

President of Lafayette College since 1945, Hutchison had conferred an honorary degree on Eisenhower after World War II and maintained a friendship with the General (Galambos, Chief of Staff, nos. 722, 1179). In 1949 Eisenhower had recommended him as a civilian member of the U.S. Air Force Academy planning board (Galambos, Columbia University, no. 322). He had visited Eisenhower the morning of February 26.

== Death ==
At the time of his death on March 15, 1966, he was president and executive director of Studies in Higher Education, a Philadelphia-based colleges and universities research firm.

== See also ==
- List of Lafayette College people

Academic offices
Preceded by Simon Strousse Baker	President of Washington and Jefferson College; 1931-1945	Succeeded by James Herbert Case, Jr.
Preceded by William Mather Lewis	President of Lafayette College; 1945–1957	Succeeded by Guy Everett Snavely (interim)
