= Clark Family Library =

Academic library in Washington, Pennsylvania, U.S.

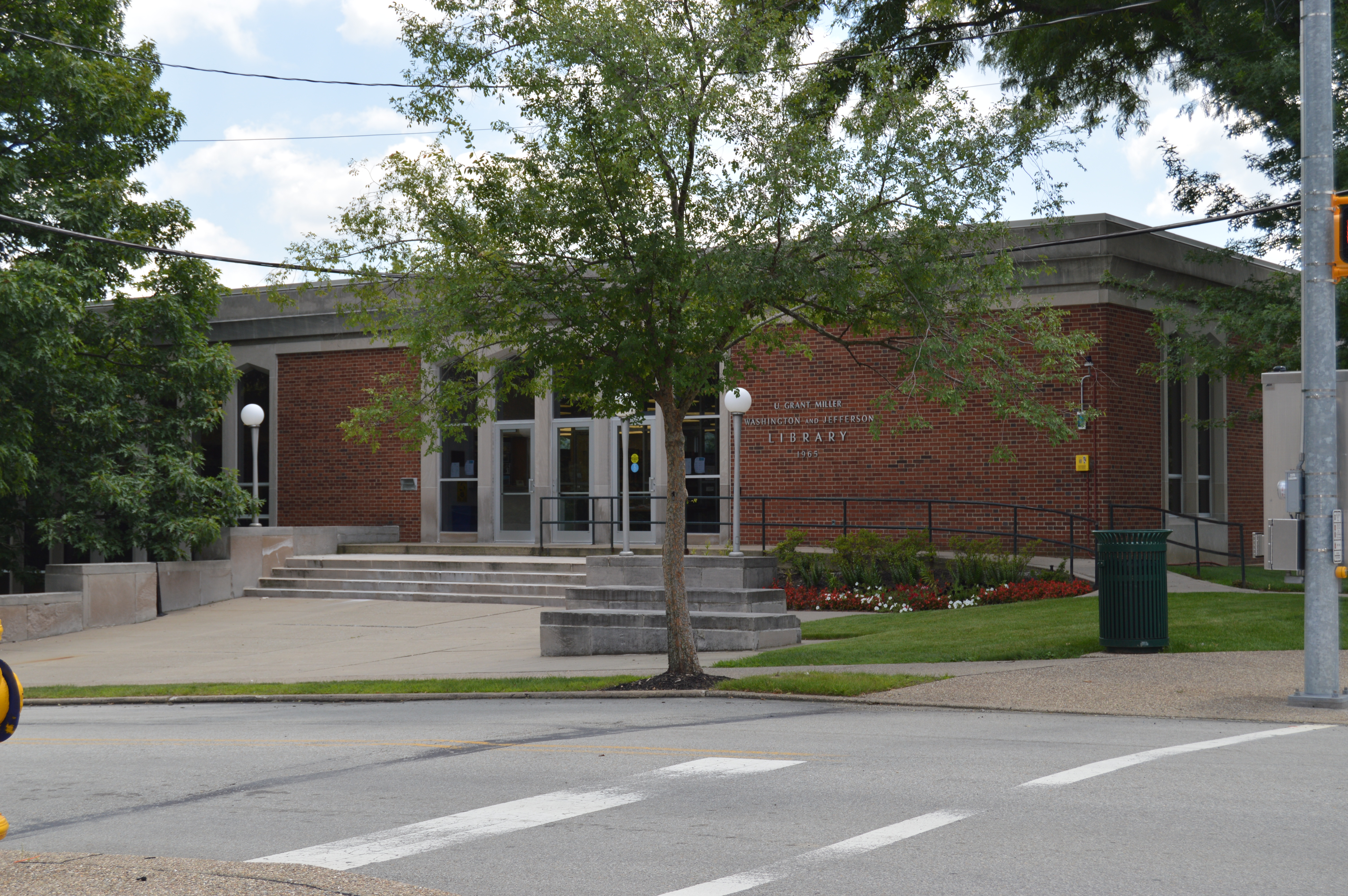
- 40°10′11″N 80°14′25″W
- Location: Washington, Pennsylvania
- Type: Academic library

Collection
- Items collected: print, digital, video, and microform
- Size: 210,000

Access and use
- Population served: Washington & Jefferson College

Other information
- Website: http://libguides.washjeff.edu/home

The Clark Family Library, formerly U. Grant Miller Library is the academic library for Washington & Jefferson College, located in Washington, Pennsylvania. The library traces its origins back to a donation from Benjamin Franklin in 1789. The Archives and Special Collections contain significant holdings of historical papers dating to the college's founding. The Walker Room contains the personal library of prominent industrialist John Walker, complete with all of his library's fixtures and furniture, installed exactly how it had been during Walker's life.

== History ==
In 1789, a £50 gift from Benjamin Franklin formed the nucleus of the library at Washington College. The library has identified five books in the collection from this original purchase. After the unification of Washington College and Jefferson College, the first unified library was the college's Carnegie Library, located in what is now called Thompson Hall. The library moved to its current building in 1965 and was called U. Grant Miller Library. The library was later renamed for Richard T. Clark, former chair of the Washington & Jefferson College board of trustees, and retired chairman and CEO of Merck & Co., and his wife, Angela, who provided the lead gift for a substantial renovation to the original 1965 structure. In the summer of 2018, the library underwent a major renovation converting the upper floor to facilitate collaborative study space, increasing the footprint of the archives and special collections, and updating the building to be more accessible for all patrons. Renovations were completed in spring 2019.

The Clark Family Library maintains a robust collection of print and electronic resources that are constantly evolving to meet the needs of the college curriculum.

In the mid-1850s, the Washington College YMCA branch held 300 volumes in its library collection.

== Archives and special collections ==
When Pittsburgh iron and steel industrialist John Walker died in 1932, the Walker family donated his private library to the college. The Walker Room on the lower level of the library is a recreation of John Walker's private library as it existed in his Western Avenue mansion in Pittsburgh. The Walker Room contains a rich collection of books, bookcases, pictures, furniture, chandeliers, and exquisite stained-glass lamps. It had been originally installed in the Thompson Library, but moved to the U. Grant Miller Library when the building opened in 1965.

The Patterson Collection includes a broad array of approximately 500 old and rare books dating from the mid-19th century to the early 20th century. This circulating collection was donated in 1929 by the estate of Thomas Hamilton Hoge Patterson of Philadelphia, a real estate developer during the early 20th century and the son of Joseph Patterson, founder of the Western Theological Seminary.

The Archives & Special Collections Library houses items related to the college and its history as well as a large collection of manuscripts and other material related to 18th and 19th century history of the United States, with an emphasis on Southwestern Pennsylvania. The Learned T. Bulman '48 Historic Archives & Museum holds rare books, manuscripts, and archival materials relating to the college's history. It was named for a W&J alum in honor of a $1 million gift. With the CONTENTdm data management interface, many of these materials are available through the U. Grant Miller Library Digital Archives, a multimedia collection of historical material from college's history, spanning the history of the log colleges, Washington College, Jefferson College, and Washington & Jefferson College.
