= Intersession =

Short break or mini-term between the traditional, standard academic terms

Intersession is a short break or mini-term between the traditional, standard academic terms. An intersession may be a period of a few weeks between semesters or quarters during which students can take short, accelerated classes or complete other academic work.

== Examples ==
At Johns Hopkins University, intersession is a "period of about three weeks in January set aside for voluntary activity on the part of both faculty and students." Most of the courses are unique to Intersession, not offered during the fall, spring, or summer semesters. Students have many options to pursue during intersession. Many courses are traditional classroom courses that fall under the category of "Academic Exploration". Other courses fulfill different purposes and fall under other categories; these include "Leading Social Change", "Career Development", and "Personal Enrichment". During this time, students can also choose to study abroad or elsewhere in the United States. Freshmen students at Johns Hopkins are also eligible for the B'More program, where participants select a course whose content relates to the Baltimore's history, culture, politics or health issues.

At Princeton University, the intersession is the week-long break for students following their first semester exams. Because exams are conducted after the holiday break in the month of January, Intersession provides a respite before beginning the second semester's studies.

At Washington & Jefferson College, Intersession is a three-week term in January. During the Intersession term, students have the choice of studying abroad, completing an external internship, or taking a specially designed Intersession course. These Intersession courses are more focused than regular courses and provide professors with an opportunity to teach non-traditional subjects. Past Intersession courses have included "Emerging Diseases: Global and Local" in the biology department, "Corporate Failures, Frauds, and Scandals" in the business department, and "Vampires and Other Bloodsuckers" in the English department, "Holocaust Survivor Narratives" in the German department, and "Alternative Radio" in the communications department.

== See also ==
- 'Intelligent Design' class at Frazier Mountain High School
