= Old Main (Washington & Jefferson College) =

Academic building built in 1834 in French Second Empire architectural style

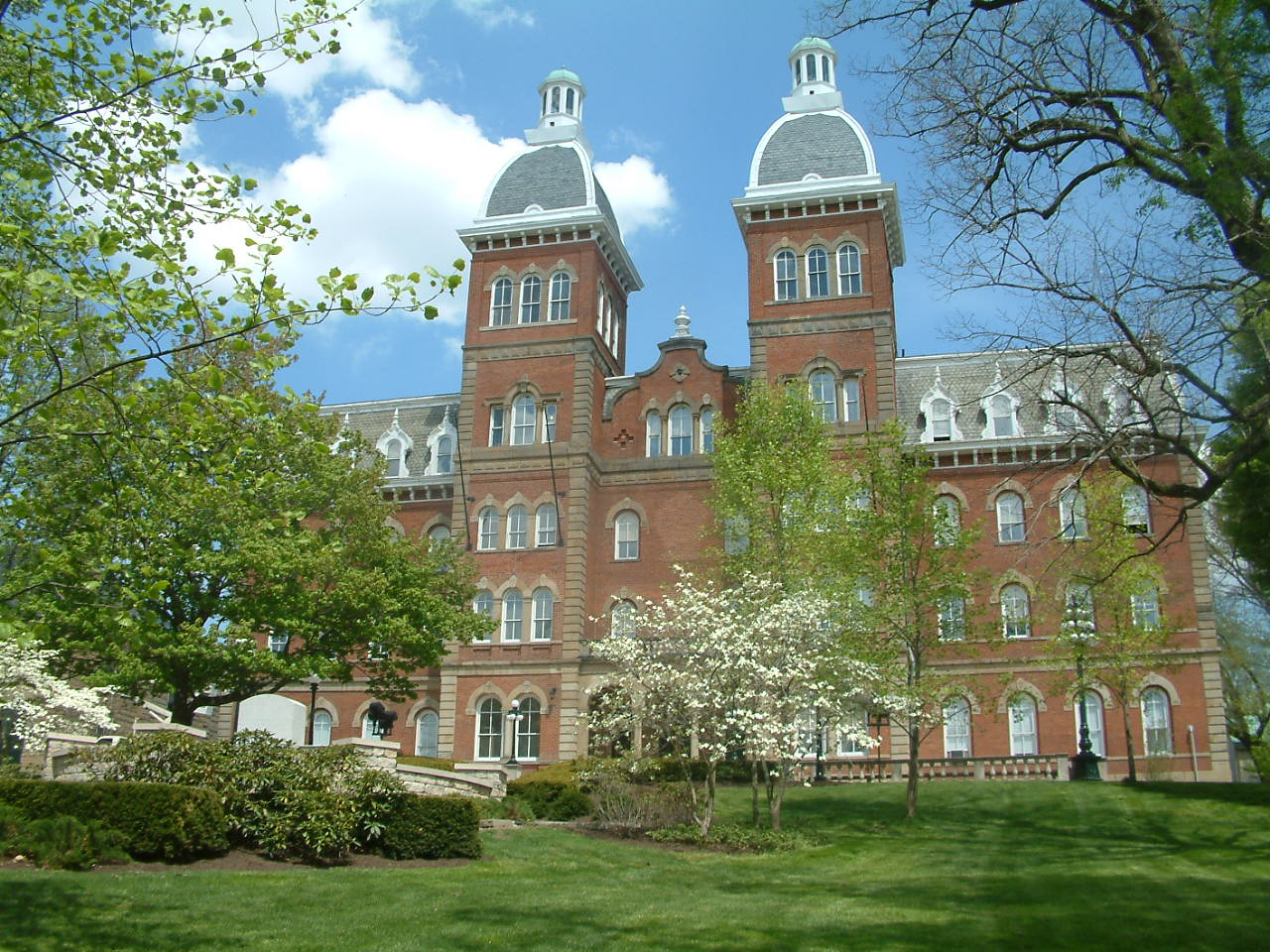
- Old Main in its current configuration
- Interactive map of the Old Main area
- Former names: "New College" "Main Hall" "College Hall"

General information
- Architectural style: Romanesque Revival, Victorian
- Coordinates: 40°10′14.7″N 80°14′29.5″W
- Construction started: 1834
- Completed: ca. 1836

Old Main is the main academic building at Washington & Jefferson College. It is the predominant building on campus and has served virtually every student since its construction. Its two identical towers, added in 1875, symbolize the union of Washington College and Jefferson College to form Washington & Jefferson College. The towers appear on the college seal, in a stylized version. The college fundraising operation founded "The Old Main Society" in 1996 to recognize individuals who utilize planned giving.

The building currently houses the academic departments of mathematics, history, religious studies, and political science. The office of the College Chaplain, called the "Pastor's Study," is on the ground floor and was used as a main setting for the 1993 George A. Romero film, The Dark Half. Room E contains one of the college's computer labs. The campus' Office of Campus and Public Safety are headquartered in Old Main.

The trustees of Washington College approved the initial construction of the "New College" in 1834, with the plan calling for a three-story academic building. From 1847 to 1850, an additional phase of construction added a dome, two new wings, and a new facade. In 1865, Washington College merged with Jefferson College in nearby Canonsburg, with the unified college being situated in Washington. To commemorate the union of these two formerly competing colleges, a new front building, a fourth floor, and two towers were added to the building in 1875. During the 20th century, various construction projects refurbished the building or re-purposed older rooms for new purposes.

== History ==
=== Initial construction ===
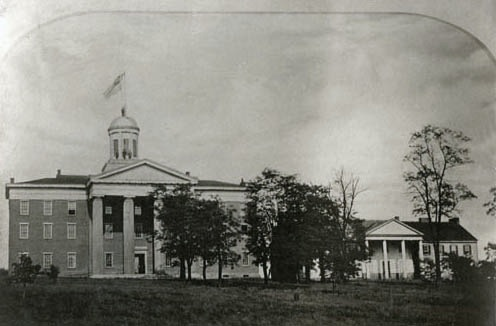
The "New College" around 1850. McMillan Hall is visible on the right.

Plans for the construction of Old Main began on March 13, 1834, when the Board of Trustees of Washington College approved a motion to build a building, with a maximum budget of $6,500. Since only $5,000 of the construction cost was to come from general College funds, a fundraising committee was appointed on March 26, 1835, to solicit donations. The specific dates of groundbreaking and completion are unknown, but it was used for commencement ceremonies in 1836. Upon its completion, the building stood three stories high and had facilities for large gatherings on the first floor and classrooms on the second and third. This initial phase of construction survives in the original building as the center-rear portion. The new building was called "the New College," to distinguish it from the college's original building, McMillan Hall. A second early phase of construction took place between 1847 and 1850, when the building received two additional wings, a dome, and a colonial facade to match that of McMillan Hall.

=== Expansion and remodeling ===
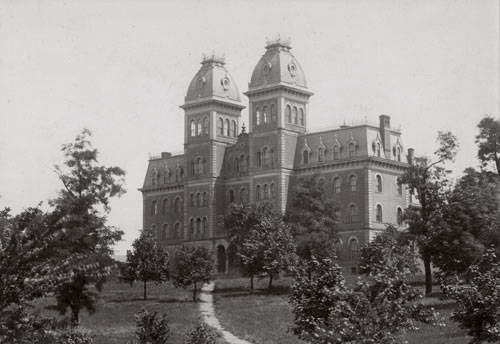
Post-expansion "Main Hall," featuring the two towers of the unified college

The building was expanded in 1875, with the addition of a new 4 story front building, two towers, and a 4th floor above the original structure. Totaling $80,000, this remodeling added a steam heating system, a music room, a museum, 12 additional classrooms, 7 laboratories, and offices for professors. The addition of the towers was to symbolize the union of Washington College with Jefferson College, which had been completed in 1865. A bell was also added the south tower of Old Main at a cost of $833.52 By the 1920s, it had fallen into disrepair and fell silent. In 1909, the chapel benches, dating to the 1875 renovation, were replaced with "fine new opera chairs" that would accommodate 374 students. The chairs had cast iron sides with a "W & J" design. A memorial to the founding of Phi Kappa Psi at Jefferson College was installed in 1909 in front of the north wing.

By 1926, a major renovation was necessary, as the wall plaster had begun to crack, the wooden floors were splintering, and the support beams created. External improvements to the building that year included sandblasting and re-mortaring the exterior, the addition of French windows, the construction of the front pillars, and a new entrance lobby with bronze doors and a large terrace. The bell tower chime received new chimes and the towers were lighted. The bell's chime signaled the beginning and end of classes. Internal improvements included new heating, new storage lockers, new clocks in each classroom connected to the bell tower, the replacement of the oak staircase with a masonry one, and a new entrance hall with bronze tablets, flags, and marble seats. The chapel received new chandeliers, portrait lighting, and a new platform for the pulpit and grand piano. The college pastor's office and the professors' gown room were furnished with new bookcases, newly upholstered chairs, new rugs, and tapestries, the most impressive of which was the one depicting college life in the College Pastor's office. Professors and students especially cheered the new plumbing and the addition of a lavatory on each floor, to replace the single lavatory in the basement. Portraits of beloved professors were placed in their former offices and a pictorial history of the history of the college adorned the halls. The Board of Trustees decreed that any vandalism of the building would result in expulsion.

Minor alternations included the removal of central windows on the second and third floor to allow for additional office space and the installation of the Phi Kappa Psi memorial fountain in the front terrace. In 1943, a new campus walkway was installed, connecting Old Main to College Street, taking passersby past the fountain.

=== 20th century modifications ===
Following World War II, a large number of veterans matriculated under the G.I. Bill, leading the largest student body in history. This influx of students necessitated some re-purposing of Old Main's facilities, including the chapel which was converted to a dining room. The faculty gown room and addition to the northeast corning of the building, served as a kitchen. By the 1950s, the student population had returned to around 550 students, allowing the chapel and gown rooms to be returned to their original purpose, with the installation of walnut railings and an organ that had been in the North Lincoln Street chapel. Hayes Hall once again housed the dining room and the kitchen addition was used for storage and would later house the Security Department. The exterior of the building was sandblasted again in 1970 and the maintenance department, which had been housed in the basement for some time, was forced to move to the Old Gym, because of fire code and insurance purposes. By the 1960s, the bell fell into disrepair and stopped ringing. In 1971, the basement was converted into a Student Government-run coffee house, called "The Pipe Room." It operated once a week and often featured live music.

In 1976, exterior lighting was added to illuminate the facade at night. In 1977, minor work was undertaken to improve the roof, woodwork, downspouts, windows, and skylights. The slate in the mansard roof was replaced in 1998. In the early 2000s, the walkway in front of Old Main was replaced with stone pavers. In celebration of the 150th anniversary of the founding of Phi Kappa Psi in 2002, the fraternity paid to return the fountain to working order. As part of a 2004 restoration grant from the Department of Housing and Urban Development, portions of Old Main were painted and weatherized, and a study was undertaken to examine further avenues for historical preservation. In 2005, the bell was renovated and rang for the first time since the 1960s.
