= Washington & Jefferson College =

Private college in Washington, Pennsylvania, US

- Former names: Jefferson College (1802–1865); Washington College (1806–1865)
- Motto: Juncta Juvant
- Motto in English: "Together We Thrive"
- Type: Private liberal arts college
- Established: 1781; 245 years ago
- Academic affiliations: Annapolis Group; PCLA; Middle States Commission on Higher Education
- Endowment: $122.9 million (2020)
- President: Elizabeth MacLeod Walls
- Undergraduates: 1,655
- Location: Washington, Pennsylvania, U.S. 40.1714°N 80.2393°W
- Campus: Small town 60 acres (0.2 km^{2})
- Cheer: Whichi Coax
- Colors: Red and black
- Nickname: Presidents
- Sporting affiliations: NCAA Division III – PAC; CWPA
- Mascot: DubJay
- Website: www.washjeff.edu

Washington & Jefferson College is a private liberal arts college in Washington, Pennsylvania, United States. It traces its origin to three Presbyterian missionaries of the 1780s, John McMillan, Thaddeus Dod, and Joseph Smith, whose early schools evolved into two rival institutions: Washington College in Washington, and Jefferson College in Canonsburg, Pennsylvania. The two colleges merged in 1865 to form Washington & Jefferson College.

The 65-acre (26 ha) Washington & Jefferson College campus has more than 40 buildings, with the oldest dating to 1793. The college enrolled over 1,500 students as of fall 2026. It has a longstanding tradition of literary societies, dating back before the union of the two colleges. Nearly all of the college's students live on campus, and roughly one-third are members of fraternities or sororities. The W&J athletic program competes in NCAA Division III.

== History ==
=== Early history and the academies ===
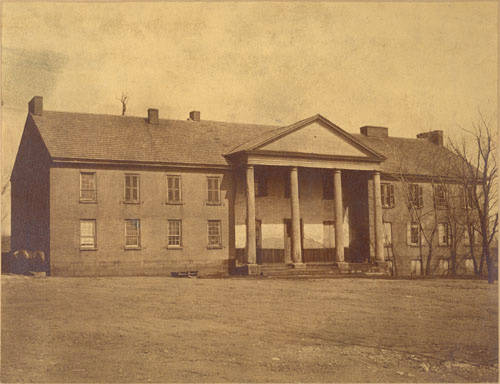
Washington Academy's sole building (now called McMillan Hall), showing the original central portion and the two wings added in 1818.

Washington & Jefferson College traces its origin to three log cabin colleges established by three frontier clergymen in the 1780s: John McMillan, Thaddeus Dod, and Joseph Smith. The three men, all graduates from the College of New Jersey (now Princeton University), came to present-day Washington County to found churches and spread Presbyterianism to what was then the American frontier beyond the Appalachian Mountains. John McMillan, the most prominent of the three founders because of his strong personality and longevity, came to the area in 1775 and built his log cabin college in 1780 near his church in Chartiers. Thaddeus Dod, known as a keen scholar, built his log cabin college in Lower Ten Mile in 1781. Joseph Smith taught classical studies in his college, called "The Study," at Buffalo.

Washington Academy was chartered by the Pennsylvania General Assembly on September 24, 1787. The first members of the board of trustees included Reverends Dod and Smith. After a difficult search for a headmaster, in which the trustees consulted Benjamin Franklin, the trustees unanimously selected Thaddeus Dod, considered to be the best scholar in western Pennsylvania. Amid financial difficulties and unrest from the Whiskey Rebellion, the academy held no classes from 1791 to 1796. In 1792, the academy secured four lots at Wheeling and Lincoln street from William Hoge and began construction on the stone Academy Building.

At a subsequent unknown date, McMillan transferred his students from the log cabin to Canonsburg Academy. Canonsburg Academy was chartered by the General Assembly on March 11, 1794, thus placing it firmly ahead of its sister school, Washington Academy, which was without a faculty, students, or facilities. On January 15, 1802, with McMillan as president of the board, the General Assembly finally granted a charter for "a college at Canonsburg."

=== Jefferson College and Washington College ===
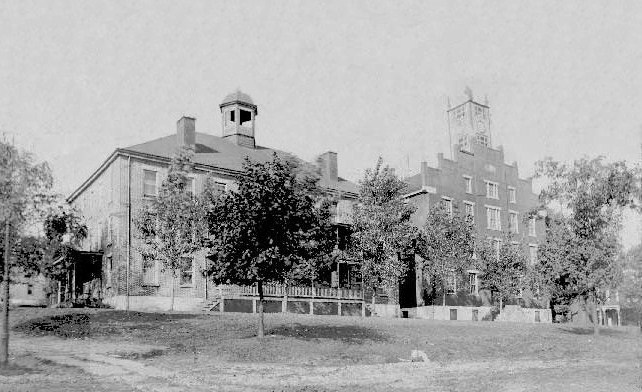
Jefferson College campus in 1900, with West College on the left and Providence Hall on the right.

In 1802, Canonsburg Academy was reconstituted as Jefferson College, with John McMillan serving as the first President of the board of trustees. In 1806, Matthew Brown petitioned the Pennsylvania General Assembly to grant Washington Academy a charter, allowing it to be re-christened as Washington College. At various times over the next 60 years, the various parties within the two colleges pursued unification with each other, but the question of where the unified college would be located thwarted those efforts. In 1817, a disagreement over a perceived agreement for unification erupted into "The College War" and threatened the existence of both colleges. In the ensuing years, both colleges began to undertake risky financial moves, especially over-selling scholarships. Thanks to the leadership of Matthew Brown, Jefferson College was in a stronger position to weather the financial storm for a longer period. Desperate for funds, Washington College accepted an offer from the Synod of Wheeling to take control of the college, a move that was supposed to stabilize the finances for a period of time. However, Washington College then undertook another series of risky financial moves that crippled its finances.

=== Unification of the colleges ===
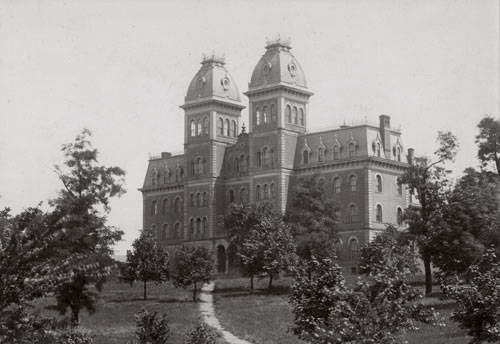
The two identical towers on Old Main symbolize the 1865 union of Jefferson College and Washington College.

Following the Civil War, both colleges were short on students and on funds, causing them to join as Washington & Jefferson College in 1865. The charter provided for the college to operate at both Canonsburg and Washington, a position that caused significant difficulty for the administration trying to rescue the college amid ill feelings over the unification. Jonathan Edwards, a pastor from Baltimore who had been president of Hanover College, was elected the first president of the unified Washington & Jefferson College on April 4, 1866. Edwards immediately encountered significant challenges, including the difficulties of administering a college across two campuses, as well as old prejudices and hard feelings among those still loyal to either Jefferson College or Washington College. Edwards resigned in 1869, as the two-campus arrangement was declared a failure and all operations were consolidated in Washington. Before the merger could be completed, Canonsburg residents and Jefferson College partisans filed a lawsuit, known as the Pennsylvania College Cases, sought to overturn the consolidation plan. Leadership of the college during this time fell to Samuel J. Wilson, a local pastor, and James I. Brownson, who had earlier been interim president of Washington College. By 1871, the United States Supreme Court upheld the consolidation, allowing the newly configured college to proceed.

=== History since unification ===
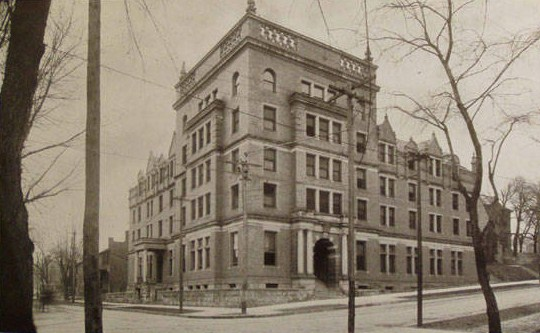
Hays Hall, named after George P. Hays, was built in 1903 and demolished in 1994.

George P. Hays, who had assumed the presidency amid the court battle and the unification controversy, led the newly unified college until 1881. His successor, James D. Moffat, led the college through a period of growth where the college constructed the Old Gym, Hays Hall, Thompson Memorial Library, and Thistle Physics Building, as well as purchasing the land known as the "old fair ground," now used for Cameron Stadium. Towards the end of his term, Moffat personally paid for the 1912 renovations of McMillan Hall. In 1914, Frederick W. Hinitt was elected president. His tenure was dominated by the United States' entry into World War I, with an enrollment drop of 50%.

William E. Slemmons, a college trustee and adjunct professor, succeeded Hinitt and served as interim president from May 1918 to June 1919. After the war ended in 1919, Samuel Charles Black took over and helped to stabilize the enrollment. While on a honeymoon tour of national parks, Black became ill and died. His successor, Simon Strousse Baker, was well liked by the college's trustees and by "many a townsman", but the student body felt that Baker was "autocratic" and held an "unfriendly attitude toward the student body as individuals." Baker defended himself, saying that the perceived ill-will towards students was unintentional and a misunderstanding. Nonetheless, the student body held a strike and general walkout in 1931, prompting Baker to resign.

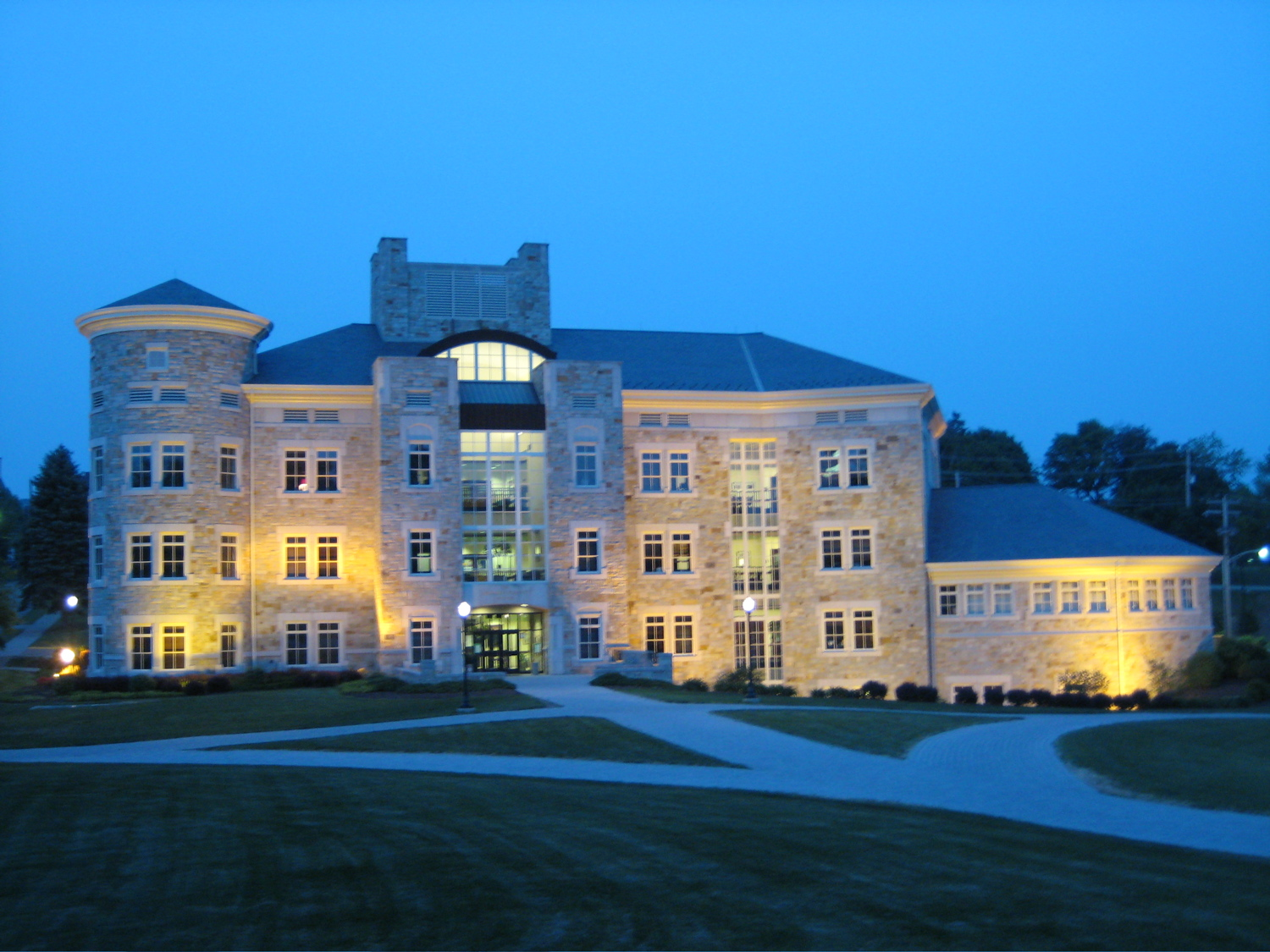
Named after Howard J. Burnett, the Burnett Center was constructed in 1998.

Baker's successor, Ralph Cooper Hutchison, was much more popular with the student body. In an effort to strengthen the college's science department, Hutchison extended and expanded the southern portion of the campus, adding the Lazear Chemistry Hall and purchasing McIlvane Hall. When World War II broke out, the campus was opened to the Army Administration School, where hundreds of soldiers received their "training in classifications." Hutchison resigned in 1945 to take the presidency of his alma mater, Lafayette College. James Herbert Case, Jr., who was president from 1946 to 1950, constructed several new dormitories to handle the influx of veterans under the G.I. Bill. In 1950, Boyd Crumrine Patterson assumed the presidency and oversaw curriculum revisions and the construction of a number of buildings, including the Henry Memorial Center, 10 Greek housing units in the center of campus, the U. Grant Miller Library, the Student Center, the Commons, and two new dormitories. His fundraising abilities grew the college's endowment expanded from $2.3 million to nearly $11 million. Patterson retired in 1970, the same year that the trustees authorized the admission of women as undergraduate students. Howard J. Burnett took office as president that year and hired the college's first female faculty members and the first female dean. The college also adopted a new academic calendar to include intersession and expanded its academic programs to include the Entrepreneurial Studies Program, the Freshman Forum, and several cooperative international education programs. Student enrollment grew from 830 in 1970 to 1,100 in 1998. Burnett retired as president in 1998.

Under Burnett's successor, Brian C. Mitchell, who served as president from 1998 to 2004, the college experienced a growth in construction and an effort to improve relations with the neighboring communities. In 2004, Tori Haring-Smith became the first woman to serve as president of Washington & Jefferson, undertaking an effort to improve the science curriculum and to construct the Swanson Science Center. After 13 years of service, Haring-Smith retired from her position on June 30, 2017. John C. Knapp was named Haring-Smith's successor on April 21, 2017, and became the college's 13th president on August 1, 2017. On February 27, 2024, the college announced the selection of Elizabeth MacLeod Walls as the 14th president. MacLeod Walls and began her tenure on June 30, 2024.

== Campus ==
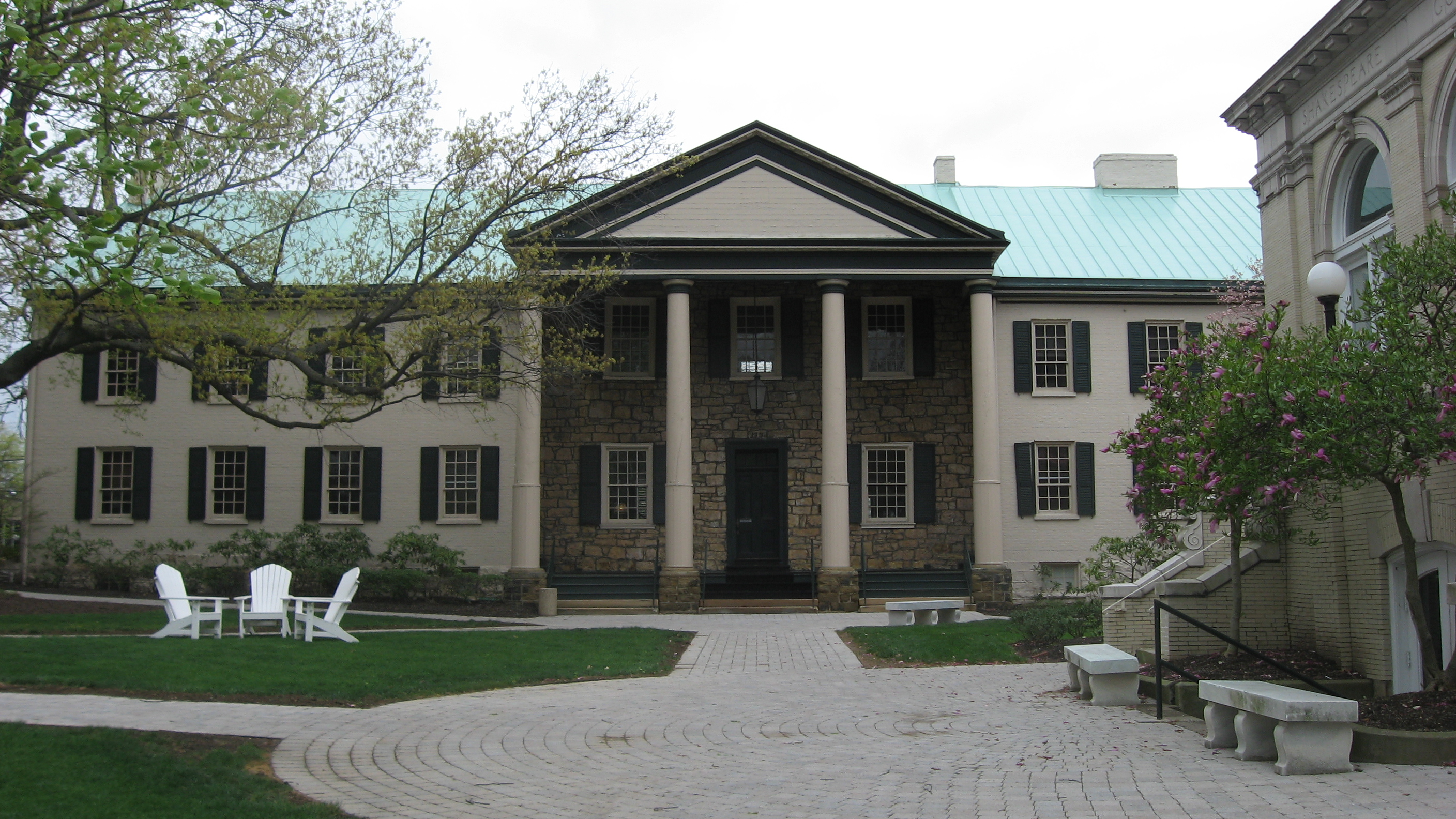
McMillan Hall, built in 1793, is listed on the National Register of Historic Places.

The campus of Washington & Jefferson College is located in the city of Washington and the East Washington Borough, small-town communities about 30 miles (48 km) south of Pittsburgh. The 65-acre (26 ha) campus is home to more than 40 academic, administrative, recreational, and residential buildings. The northern edge of campus is bound by East Walnut Street, the western edge by South College Street, the southern edge by East Maiden Street, and the eastern edge by South Wade. Portions of the campus extend into the East Washington Historic District. Four historic gates mark four traditional entrances to campus at East Maiden Street, Wheeling Street, South College Street, and Beau Street. In 1947, the Pennsylvania Historical and Museum Commission installed a historical marker noting the historic importance of the college.

The oldest surviving building is McMillan Hall, which dates to 1793 and is the oldest college building west of the Allegheny Mountains. The main academic building is Old Main, which is topped with two prominent towers. The Old Gym houses a modern exercise facility. McIlvaine Hall, which was originally home to a female seminary, was demolished in 2008 and replaced by the Swanson Science Center. Davis Memorial Hall was once a dormitory and private house. The Swanson Science Center and the Dieter-Porter Life Sciences Building all cater to the scientific curriculum. The Burnett Center and its sister building, the Technology Center, were built in the late 1990s and early 2000s.

The first dormitory on campus was Hays Hall. Wade House, Carriage House, and Whitworth House are Victorian homes housing older students. The recently constructed Chestnut Street Housing complex provides housing for the college's Greek organizations. The Presidents' Row is a cluster of ten buildings in the center of campus, several of which are dedicated to theme housing. Two sister dormitories, New Residence Hall and Bica-Ross Hall, feature suite-style living arrangements. Mellon Hall houses female freshman, and Upperclass Hall houses male freshmen. Other dormitories include Alexander Hall, Cooper Hall (formerly Beau Hall), Marshall Hall, Penn House, and the currently unused North Hall. The college administration utilizes several buildings, including the Admissions House, the Alumni House, and the President's House, which are all modified Victorian homes. The Clark Family Library, formerly known as the U. Grant Miller Library, is the modern library; its predecessor, Thompson Hall, is now used for administrative purposes. The Hub, the Commons, and the Rossin Campus Center provide recreational and dining facilities for students. The athletic and intramural teams utilize Cameron Stadium for football and track. The Henry Memorial Center is used for basketball, wrestling, swimming, and volleyball. Other athletic facilities include Brooks Park, Ross Memorial Park and Alexandre Stadium, and the Janet L. Swanson Tennis Courts.

Washington & Jefferson is the setting for the Netflix programs The Chair and Mindhunter.

== Academics ==
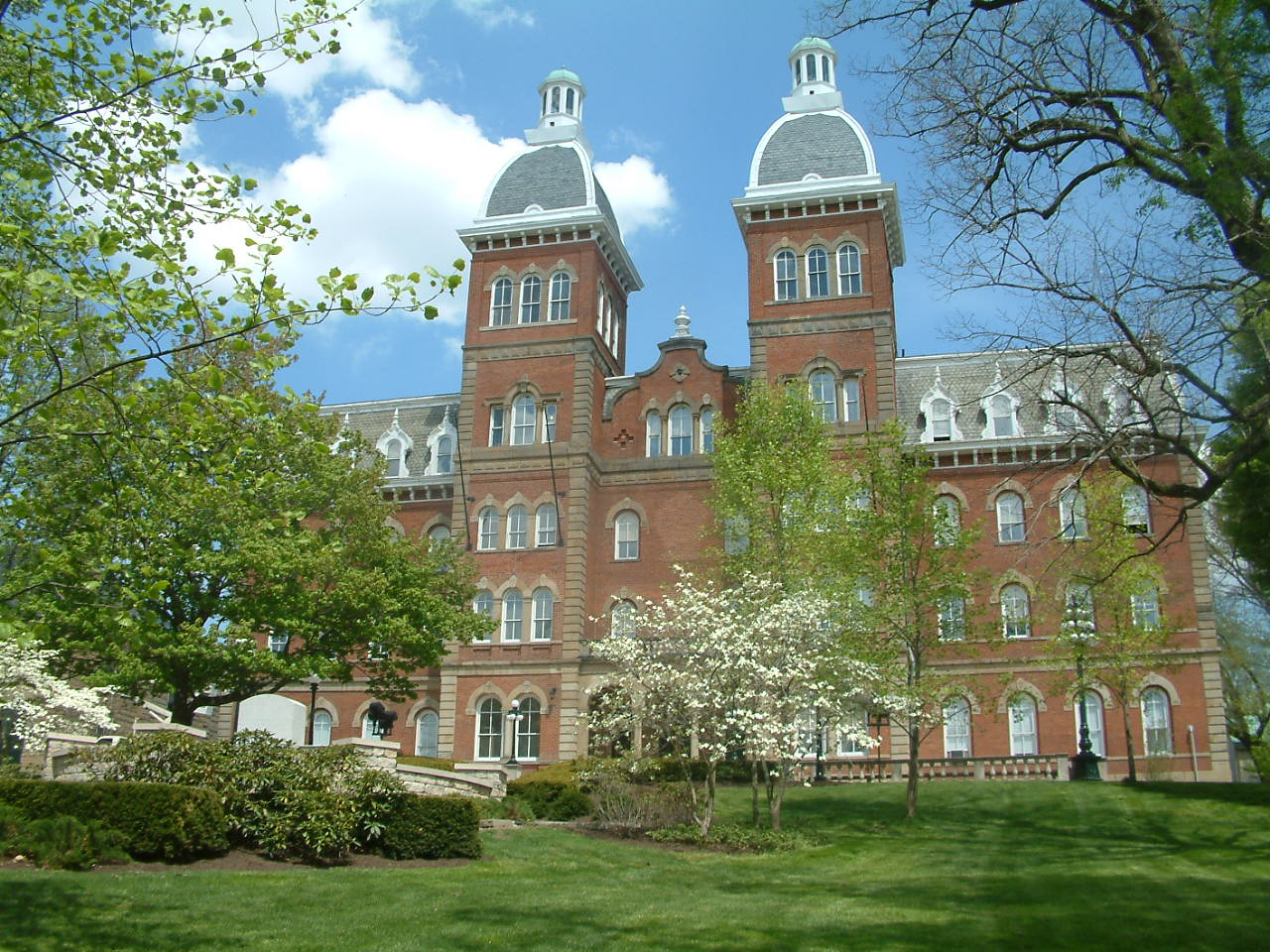
Old Main

As a liberal arts college, Washington & Jefferson College focuses exclusively on undergraduate education. It is accredited by the Middle States Association of Colleges and Schools. The college's teaching environment reflects the liberal arts tradition of small group instruction by maintaining an average class size of 17 and a student/faculty ratio of 12:1. 85% of faculty have terminal degrees and no classes are taught by teaching assistants. The college has a strong science program, with 35% of students majoring in one of the scientific departments. Within those areas, all 32 professors hold terminal degrees. The most frequent class size is between 10 and 19 students.

The college has a focus on preparing students for graduate school and professional programs. Across all disciplines, 85% to 90% of students who apply to such programs receive offers of admission. Among students who apply to medical school or related health graduate programs, 90% of students gain admission. Approximately 11% of all current W&J alumni are physicians and engineers, making the college third in the nation per capita for producing doctors and scientific researchers. Among students who apply to law school, approximately 90% of students gain admission.

The college recently added The English Language Institute which is a pre-academic program designed to equip multi-lingual learners with the English and academic skills to be prepared for undergraduate study.

=== Admission and rankings ===
Admissions statistics
- 2023 entering class
- Admit rate: 81.54%
- Yield rate: 11.97%

Test scores middle 50%^{[i]}
- SAT Total: 1030–1250 (among 40% of FTFs)
- ACT Composite: 26 (among 10% of FTFs)

High school GPA
- Average: 3.5

Admission to Washington & Jefferson College is classified as "inclusive" by the Carnegie Classification of Institutions of Higher Education. The Princeton Review gave Washington & Jefferson an "Admissions Selectivity Rating" of 85 out of 99.

In 2023, the college received 3,218 applications. It extended offers of admission to 2,624 applicants, or 82%. 314 accepted students chose to enroll, a yield rate of 12%. Of the 40% of incoming students in 2023 who submitted SAT scores, the interquartile range was 1030–1250; of the 10% of incoming students in 2023 who submitted ACT scores, the average composite score was 26. Of all matriculating students, the average high school GPA was 3.5. In 2009, the college developed an SAT-optional admissions program.

Academic rankings

Liberal arts
- U.S. News & World Report: 90
- Washington Monthly: 108

National
- Forbes: 430
- WSJ/College Pulse: 208

In the 2025 U.S. News & World Report college rankings, Washington & Jefferson is ranked 90th (tied) of 211 liberal arts colleges nationwide. In Forbes' List of America's Best Colleges for 2010, the college was ranked #100 out of the nation's institutions of higher education. The Washington Monthly ranked the college #132 among all American liberal arts colleges in terms of social mobility, research, and community service. The rankings listed the college as #30 in the nation in terms of Federal Work-Study Program money spent of community service.

=== Curriculum ===
The curriculum is centered on the traditional liberal arts education and pre-professional classes. All first-semester freshmen must complete a "First Year Seminar" class, which introduces new students to a variety of lectures, concerts, plays, and trips to museums or galleries based on a different course theme selected each year. In addition to completing an academic major, students must satisfy the college-wide general education requirements, which include classes in the arts, humanities, natural sciences and mathematics, foreign languages, cultural diversity, and academic skills classes including writing, oral communication, quantitative reasoning. Students may choose to complete an academic minor, participate in interdepartmental concentrations, or to focus on an intra-departmental emphasis. Additionally, all students must complete a physical education requirement, amounting to one full semester class, making W&J one of the few liberal arts colleges without a physical education major to have such a requirement. The college maintains a number of combined degree programs, allowing students to attend graduate or professional school in lieu of senior year.

The College follows a standard academic calendar with the option to partake in summer classes or May Term. During the Intersession term, students have the choice of studying abroad, completing an external internship, or taking a specially designed Intersession course. These Intersession courses are more focused than regular courses and provide professors with an opportunity to teach non-traditional subjects. Past Intersession courses have included "Emerging Diseases: Global and Local" in the biology department, "Corporate Failures, Frauds, and Scandals" in the business department, and "Vampires and Other Bloodsuckers" in the English department, "Holocaust Survivor Narratives" in the German department, and "Alternative Radio" in the communications department. At various times, the faculty organizes an "Integrated Semester," where professors organize regular departmental courses, specialized projects, and public events dealing with a common interdisciplinary theme. While W&J has not had a Reserve Officers' Training Corps (ROTC) program since 1991, the college has a relationship with the University of Pittsburgh's Army and Air Force ROTC programs, allowing W&J students to prepare for an active or reserve commission following graduation.

== Student body ==
Demographics of student body
	Undergraduate	Pennsylvania	U.S. Census
African American	2.84%	11.20%	12.1%
Asian American	1.19%	2.46%	4.3%
White American	81.97%	86.83%	65.8%
Hispanic American	1.32%	4.19%	14.5%
Native American	0.46%	0.54%	0.9%
International student	2.05%	N/A	N/A
Unknown/unspecified	10.17%	N/A	N/A

As of fall 2026, the student body totaled 1,655 undergraduate students. The student body is highly residential, with 98% of students residing in campus housing. Washington & Jefferson College was named to the Phi Theta Kappa Transfer Honor Roll in 2025 and 2026, a recognition for four-year institutions that support community college transfer students.

The male to female ratio was 54% to 46% in 2009. Like the population of Pennsylvania and the United States as a whole, the largest ethnic group at the college was White American, making up about 82% of the student population. Roughly 10% of the student population does not specify their ethnicity. Other ethnicities, including African American, Asian American, Native American, and Hispanic Americans collectively comprise about 6% of the student body. International students make up 2.05% of the student body.

The college has joined the YES Prep School IMPACT Partnership Program to provide support to low-income students from the YES Prep Public Schools.

== Student life ==
=== Student housing ===
The college offers "Theme Community Living," where students with common interests live in a single living unit. Past themes have included the "Intensive Study," the "Service Leadership Community," the "International House," "Music House," the "WashPA Radio Theme Community" for students who participate in the WNJR college radio station, and the "Pet House". Students proposing a theme community must develop an educational plan centered on the theme. The college does not typically allow students to live in off-campus housing.

=== Clubs ===
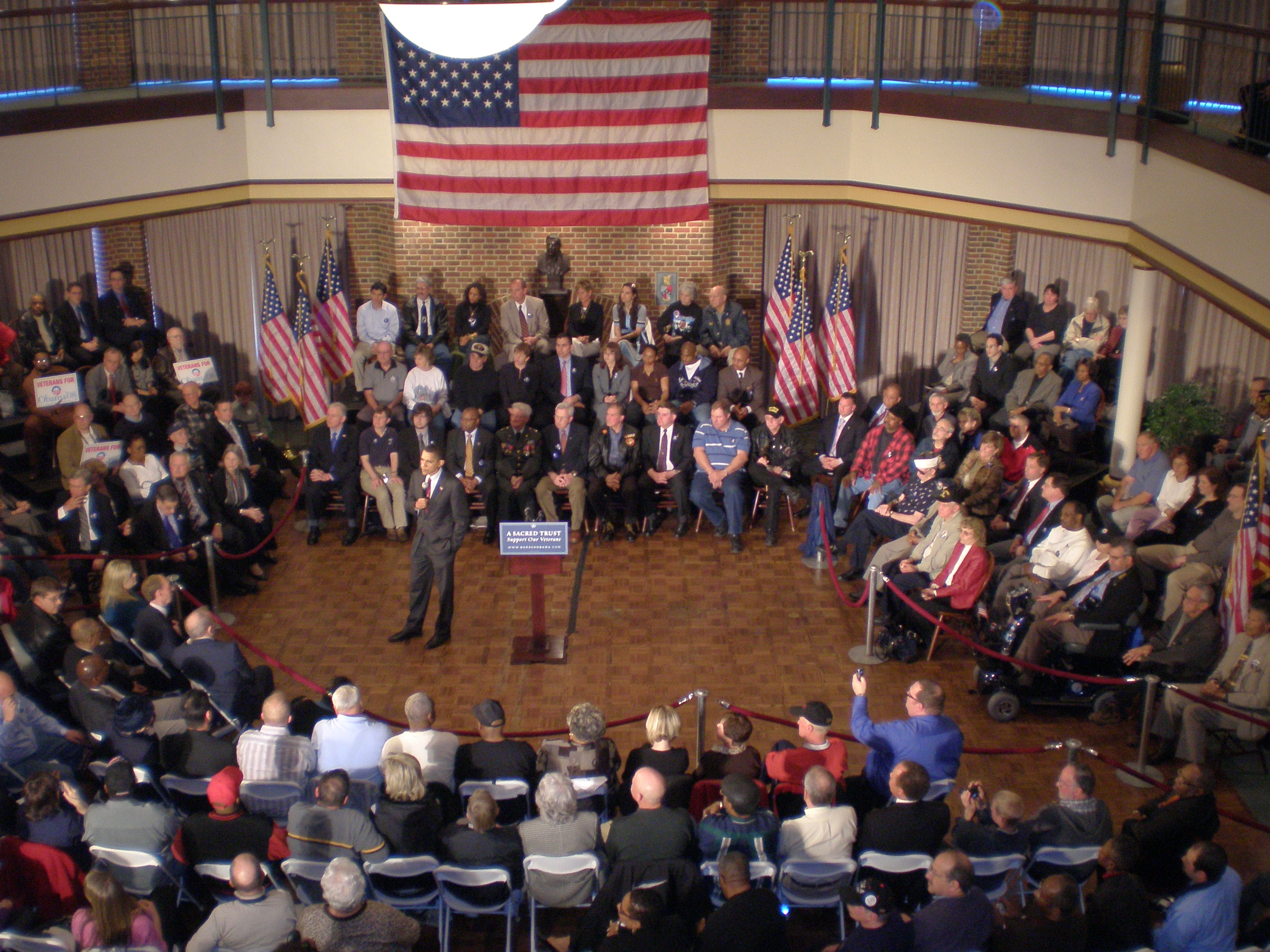
Barack Obama campaigning at W&J in 2008

Students may organize new clubs by presenting a constitution and a list of members to the college administration and the student government for approval.

In 2010, the college recognized over 70 student clubs on campus. A number of student clubs are dedicated to encouraging interest in a specific academic discipline, including the "W&J Denominators" mathematics club, the Society of Physics Students, and the Pre-Health Professions Society. Others are organized along ethnic and cultural lines, including the Black Student Union and the Asian Culture Association. Both major American political parties have chapters at the college, in the form of the "W&J College Democrats" and the Young Republicans. Some clubs take the form of non-varsity athletic teams, including the Men's Rugby Club, the Women's Rugby Club, the Equestrian Club, Men's Volleyball Club and the Ultimate Frisbee Club. Several clubs create volunteer opportunities though Big Brothers/Big Sisters and the United Way. Many religious faiths are represented, including the Hillel Society, Newman Club, and the Student Christian Association, as well as an Interfaith Leadership Club which organizes interfaith events. Many other clubs encourage interests in various academic and non-academic activities, including the Green Club (the college's environmental club), the Outdoors Club, and others which are mainly inactive like the Bottega Art Club, the Franklin Literary Society, and the Chess Club.

=== Student media ===
Student media offerings at Washington & Jefferson College include a college newspaper, a college radio station, a yearbook, and a student-edited literary journal. All students, regardless of academic major, are eligible to contribute to these media organizations.

Founded in 1909, the Red & Black student newspaper has a weekly circulation of 1,250 copies. The student staff handles all aspects of the production, including writing, editing, graphic design, layout, and advertising sales. The Red & Black features local and national news, student opinion, and college athletics coverage. During the 1860s, students published a satirical newspaper called The Bogus Tract.

The college radio station, WNJR broadcasts on the FM broadcast band. Assisted by a faculty advisor from the Department of Theater and Communication, the student-run studio broadcasts in a freeform format with both nationally syndicated programs and Pittsburgh-based independent programs. Student on-air personalities produce radio programs including music, news, talk, and sports. It serves the Pittsburgh Designated Market Area, reaching north to the northern Pittsburgh suburbs, east to Monessen, south to Waynesburg and west to the West Virginia Panhandle.

The Wooden Tooth Review is a student-edited literary journal, featuring short fiction and poetry submitted by members of the student body. The editorial board is organized as a recognized student club, with a faculty advisor. The journal was founded in 1999, with V. Penelope Pelizzon, Coordinator of Creative Writing, serving as the first faculty advisor. The college's yearbook, Pandora, is produced annually by a student staff.

=== Literary societies ===
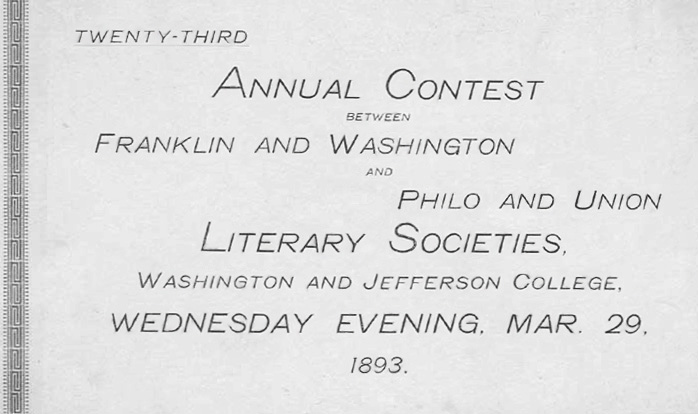
Cover of the playbill for the 1893 Contest

The history of literary societies at Washington & Jefferson College dates back to the 1797, when the Franklin Literary Society and the Philo Literary Society were founded at Canonsburg Academy. Two other literary societies were founded at Washington College, the Union Literary Society in 1809 and the Washington Literary Society in 1814. Typical early activities include the presentation of dialogues, translations of passages from Greek or Latin classics, and extemporaneous speaking. Later, the literary societies began to present declamations. Each society maintained independent libraries for the use of their members, each of which rivaled the holdings of their respective colleges. These four college literary societies had intense rivalries with each other, competing in "contests", which pitted select society members against another in "compositions, speaking select orations and debating", with the trustees selecting the victor. Because the two colleges never met each other in athletic contests, these literary competitions were the main outlet for their rivalry. In the years after the union of the two colleges, these four literary societies merged with the Franklin Literary Society, which survives today.

=== Art scene ===
Washington & Jefferson College is home to a vibrant student art and musical scene. The artistic center of campus is the Olin Fine Arts Center, with an art gallery and a 486-seat auditorium. On the academic side, the Department of Art offers majors in studio art and art education, as well as a concentration in graphic design. The Department of Music offers majors and minors in music. The Department of Theatre and Communications offers a major and minor in theatre. Current musical organizations include the W&J Wind Ensemble, the W&J Jazz Ensemble, the W&J Choir and the Camerata Singers. Former musical organizations include the Banjo, Mandolin & Guitar Club and the College Band. Every year since 2003, the Theatre and Communication Department has produced the Winter Tales series, an annual production of one-act plays written by members of the W&J community, students, alumni, faculty, administration, and staff, and produced by the W&J Student Theater Company.

In addition to student-produced art and music, the college provides a number of opportunities to view art and music from the larger art community. The college holds a collection of paintings by distinguished regional artist Malcolm Parcell, which are displayed in several locations on campus. The most prominent location is the Malcolm Parcell Room in The Commons, which is part of the student dining area. The W&J Arts Series is an annual collection of musicians, singers, and other artistic performers appearing at the Olin Fine Arts Center. Past shows have included Di Wu, Habib Koité, Chris Potter, The Aquila Theatre Company presenting The Invisible Man, Eroica Trio, Oni Buchanan, Tommy Sands, Cavani String Quartet, Sergio and Odar Assad, and Sandip Burman. In 1999, billionaire W&J alum and well-known opera philanthropist Alberto Vilar sponsored the Vilar Distinguished Artist Series. During its run, the series hosted, among others, Lorin Maazel conducting the Bavarian Radio Symphony Orchestra, Valery Gergiev conducting the Kirov Orchestra, Camerata Salzburg with Murray Periaha, St. Petersburg Classic Ballet, Vienna State Opera Ballet, Susan Graham, Jennifer Larmore, Samuel Ramey, Barbara Bonney, Katia and Marielle Labèque, Angelika Kirchschlager, Simon Keenlyside, Gil Shaham, and Jessye Norman. In 2003, amid Vilar's falling fortunes, the series went on a hiatus, and Vilar's 2005 indictment for financial fraud ended the series. In Fall 2003, the W&J Arts Series, the college's other art series, was expanded to partially compensate.

=== Greek life ===
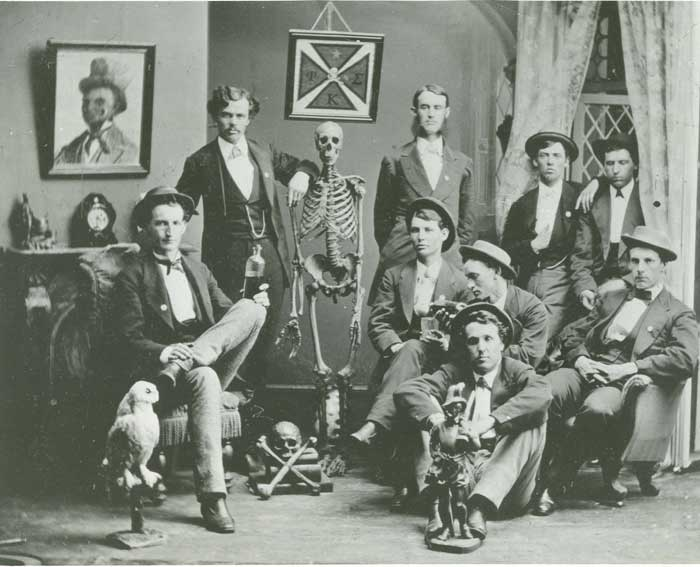
Members of Phi Kappa Sigma pose for a chapter photo in the early 1870s.

43% of women and 40% of men of the student body participate in Greek life. The Princeton Review named Washington & Jefferson College 12th on their 2010 list of "Major Frat and Sorority Scene" in the United States. As of 2022, there were four fraternities and four sororities. All Greek organizations occupy college-owned houses on Chestnut Street.

Two national fraternities were founded at Jefferson College, Phi Gamma Delta in 1848 and Phi Kappa Psi in 1852. A third fraternity was founded at Jefferson College, Kappa Phi Lambda, but it dissolved after a decade of existence amid a dispute between chapters. In 1874, a fourth fraternity was founded at W&J, the short-lived Phi Delta Kappa. The new fraternity grew to several chapters before falling apart in 1880.

== Athletics ==
=== Intercollegiate ===
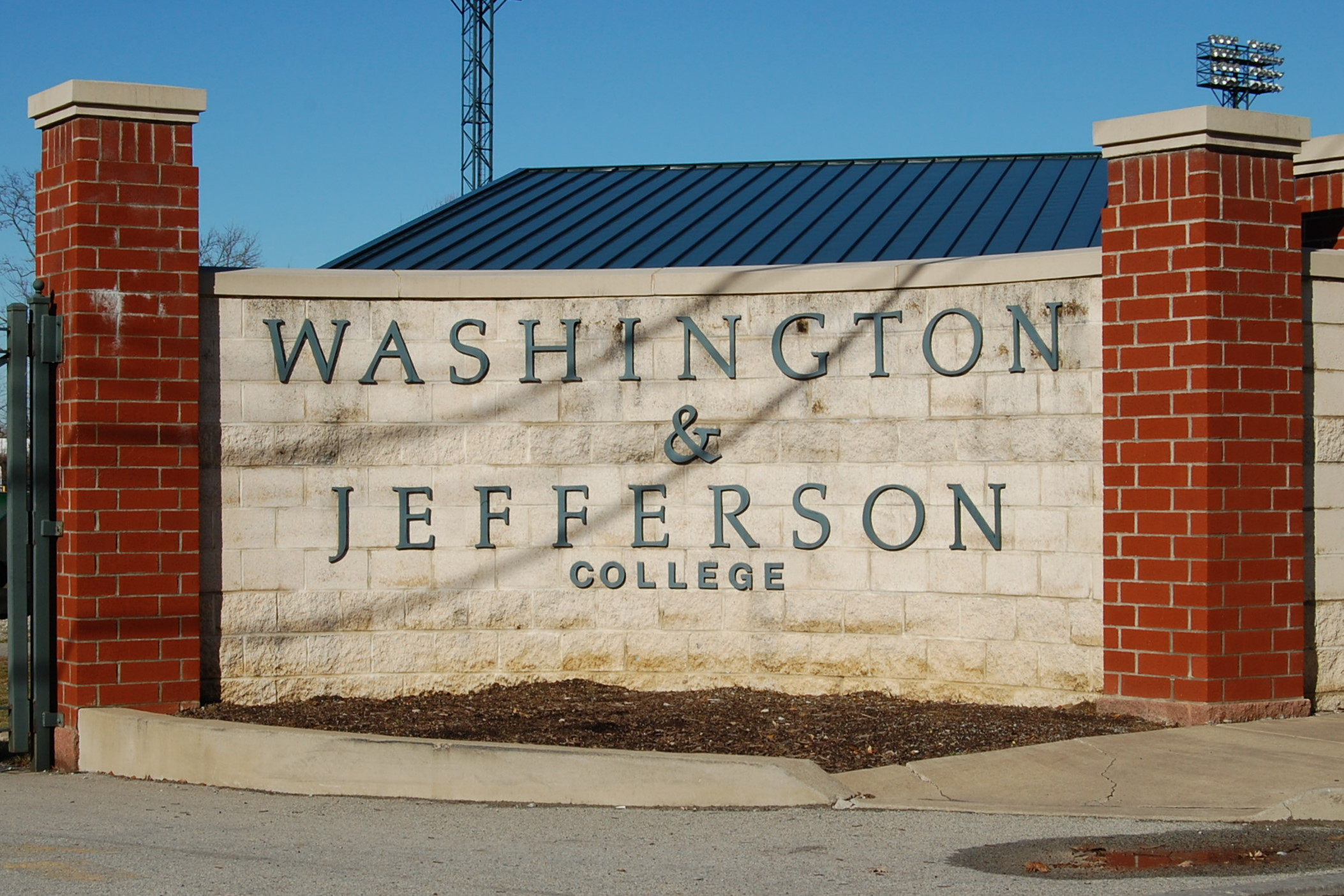
Cameron Stadium, home of Washington & Jefferson Presidents football since 1890.

Washington & Jefferson College competes in 28 varsity sports at the National Collegiate Athletic Association (NCAA) Division III level. As of the 2025-26 academic year, the Presidents have won more than 158 Presidents' Athletic Conference (PAC) championships, 40 students were selected as conference Most Valuable Player, more than 300 athletes were awarded First Team All-Conference recognition, 75 received All-American honors, and 25 achieved Academic All-American status. During the 2005–2006 season, 34 percent of the student body played varsity-level athletics.

The football team has been very successful, winning 18 out of the last 21 PAC Championships and advancing to the NCAA Division III playoffs 17 times. W&J played to a 0–0 tie in the 1922 Rose Bowl against the California Golden Bears and were named to a share of the national championship by the Boand System. In 1923, John Heisman coached the W&J football team. The men's ice hockey team won the 2008 College Hockey Mid America Conference championship, a Division I regional league of the American Collegiate Hockey Association. W&J also fields teams in field hockey, men's wrestling, baseball, softball, and women's volleyball, as well as men's and women's cross country running, soccer, tennis, water polo, basketball, swimming and diving, golf, lacrosse, and track & field. Men's volleyball and women's wrestling will be added in the 2026–27 school year.

=== Intramural ===
The intramural sports program is one of the most consistently popular activities at Washington & Jefferson College, providing non-varsity and recreational athletic activities for all students, faculty, and staff of the college. Vicki Staton, a former varsity women's basketball and volleyball coach, manages the intramural program. In 2002, 60% of students participated in intramural sports. In 2006, more than 40% of the student body participated in intramural athletics. In 2007, the intramural activities included 3-on-3 basketball, billiards, bowling, flag football, kickball, tennis, ultimate frisbee, volleyball, wallyball, ping pong, and Texas hold 'em. Intramural champions win a T-shirt celebrating their victory.

While the varsity athletics program was struggling during the 1930s, intramural participation topped 84% of the student population. During that time, the management of intramural activities was transferred to the athletic department, allowing the intramural program to use the college's varsity facilities. In the 1930s and 1940s, groups of students competed for the "Big Cup," a trophy given to the most outstanding team, as judged by a cross-sport point system.

== Traditions ==
=== Symbols of the college ===
The coat of arms of Washington & Jefferson.

The college's coat of arms features a two-part shield based on the coats of arms of the Jefferson and Washington families. The top portion, showing two towers, representing Washington College and Jefferson College, and three stars, representing the McMillan, Dod, and Smith log cabins. The lower portion, showing an interlocked design that in heraldry is called a fret, is adapted from Jefferson's coat of arms and the colors, red and black, is taken from the Washington coat of arms. The coat of arms may appear with a banner underneath showing the college motto. The design was adopted in 1902 in celebration of Jefferson College's centennial. It was designed by Rev. Harry B. King, class of 1891. Upon its adoption, it was described as "a happy combination, and makes a very neat appearance when worn as a pin or button."

The college seal displays two brick towers, with one labeled "1802," representing Jefferson College, and the other labeled "1806," representing Washington College. The union of the two colleges is represented by a bridge between the two towers, with Roman numerals reading 1865, the year of union. Banners hanging from the towers show the college motto of "Juncta Juvant." The creation of the seal is unknown, with the first known use occurring during the 1902 centennial celebration of Jefferson College's founding. The seal is used in official documents, including diplomas and certificates.

The college's current logo features a stylized version of the two towers of Old Main, symbolizing the 1865 unification of Washington College and Jefferson College. The logo may be displayed in several versions: with the entire name of the college, the shortened form of "W&J", or without any text. Prior to the adoption of this logo, the college's graphic identity consisted of a variety of conflicting logos and type styles.

== Relations with the city of Washington ==
Relations between the city of Washington, Pennsylvania and Washington & Jefferson College span over two centuries, dating to the founding of both the city and the college in the 1780s. The relationship between the town and college was strong enough that the citizens of Washington offered a $50,000 donation in 1869 to the college in a successful attempt to lure the trustees to select Washington over nearby Canonsburg as the consolidated location of the college. The relationship encountered challenges the 20th century, with disagreements arising between the college and residential neighborhoods as the college pursued an expansion plan. Preservationists unsuccessfully attempted to pass laws prohibiting the college from demolishing certain buildings that were listed on the East Washington Historic District. Local preservationists also unsuccessfully tried to block the demolition of Hays Hall, which had been condemned. In the 1990s, the city of Washington made several unsuccessful attempts to challenge the college's tax-exempt status. In 1993, Washington appealed the Washington County Board of Assessment's determination that the college was exempt from the city's property tax. That case went to the Pennsylvania Supreme Court, which ruled in favor of the college. In response, the Pennsylvania General Assembly passed a new law clarifying that colleges were exempt from taxation, including from local property taxes. Separately, the city of Washington passed an ordinance that levied a municipal "service fee" against the college students, which was ruled to be illegal and was struck down. In the late 1990s, the college and town created the Blueprint for Collaboration, a plan with detailed goals and benchmarks for the future to help the college and the city work together on economic development, environmental protection, and historic preservation.

== Notable alumni ==
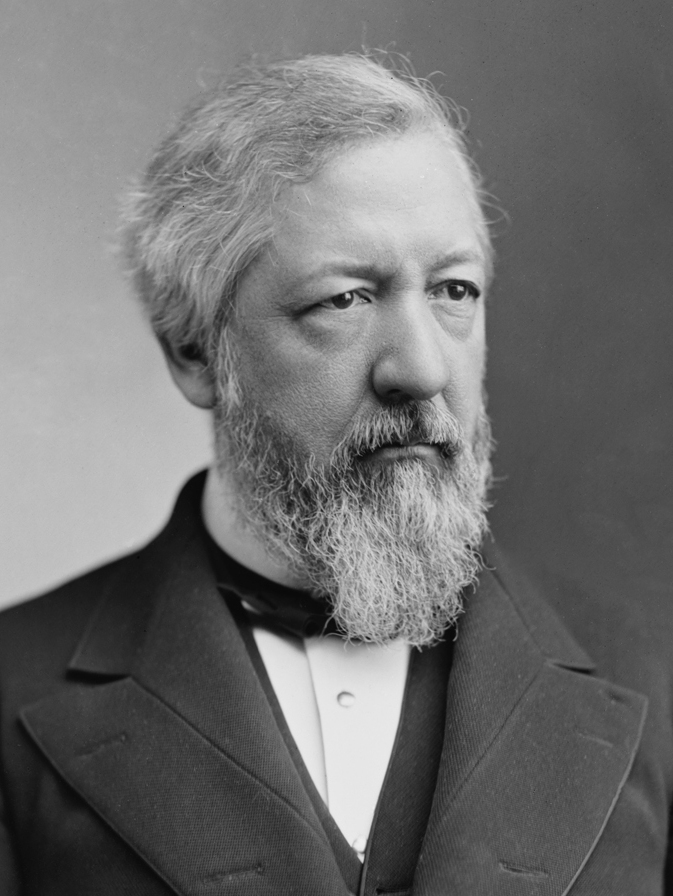
James G. Blaine served as U.S. Congressman, Speaker of the House, U.S. Senator, Secretary of State, and almost won the 1884 presidential election.

As of 2026, Washington & Jefferson College had about 12,000 living alumni. Before the union of the two colleges, Washington College graduated 872 men and Jefferson College graduated 1,936 men. These alumni include Henry A. Wise, Governor of Virginia, and James G. Blaine, who served in Congress as Speaker of the House, U.S. Senator from Maine, two-time United States Secretary of State and the Republican nominee for the 1884 presidential election. Other graduates have held high federal positions, including United States Secretary of the Treasury Benjamin Bristow and United States Attorney General Henry Stanbery, who successfully defended Andrew Johnson during his impeachment trial. As a U.S. Congressman, Clarence Long was a key figure in directing funds to Operation Cyclone, the CIA's effort to arm the mujahideen in the Soviet–Afghan War. James A. Beaver served as Governor of Pennsylvania and as acting president of the Pennsylvania State University; he is the namesake of Beaver Stadium. Blake Ragsdale Van Leer, was the fifth president of Georgia Tech and first president to allow women to enroll there. He also had a prominent military career. William Holmes McGuffey authored the McGuffey Readers, which are among the most popular and influential books in history. Thaddeus Dod's student, Jacob Lindley, was the first president of Ohio University. Astronaut and test pilot Joseph A. Walker became the first person to enter space twice. Other graduates have gone on to success in professional athletics, including Buddy Jeannette, a member of the Basketball Hall of Fame, and Pete Henry, a member of both the College and Pro Football Hall of Fame. Roger Goodell has served as the Commissioner of the NFL since 2006.

Among graduates who entered the medical field, Jonathan Letterman is recognized as the "Father of Battlefield Medicine." William Passavant is recognized as a saint within the Lutheran Church. James McGready, who studied with Joseph Smith and John McMillan was a leading revivalist in the Second Great Awakening. Successful graduates in the business realm include Richard Clark, President and CEO of Merck, John S. Reed, the former chairman of Citigroup and the New York Stock Exchange.
