= List of Presbyterian churches in Pennsylvania =

This is a list of notable Presbyterian churches in Pennsylvania, where a church is notable either as a congregation or as a building. In Pennsylvania, numerous churches are listed on the National Register of Historic Places or are noted on state or local historic registers. This list also includes sites listed by the Presbyterian Historical Society as part of their American Presbyterian/Reformed Historical Sites Registry (APRHS), which also includes sites from related Reformed churches and congregations.

This article also includes related other items, such as various former Presbyterian meetinghouse sites, or cemeteries or parsonages that are NRHP-listed where the corresponding church building is more modern and not NRHP-listed.

Building	Image	Built	Reference	Location	City State	Description
Abington Presbyterian Church		1896	APRHS 179	1082 Old York Rd; 40.1141°N 75.1229°W	Abington	Founded 1714, first church built 1719
Alexander Dobbin House		1776	APRHS 226	89 Steinwehr Avenue; 39.8222°N 77.2331°W	Gettysburg	
Amity Presbyterian Church			APRHS 414	4625 Scrubgrass Road; 41.2357°N 79.9838°W	Grove City	
Arch Street Presbyterian Church		1855	1971 NRHP-listed	1726–1732 Arch Street; 39°57′16″N 75°10′11″W	Philadelphia	Founded 1813 as the Fifth Presbyterian Church. Reorganized 1850. Neoclassical design by Hoxie & Button
Bensalem Presbyterian Church		1710 c.	APRHS 75	2826 Bristol Road; 40.1330°N 74.9327°W	Bensalem	Founded 1705 as Dutch Reformed, 1730 Presbyterian. William Tennent founded the Log College while minister
Bethel Presbyterian Church		1910	APRHS 58	2977 Bethel Church Road; 40.3361°N 80.0480°W	Bethel Park	Founded by John McMillan in 1776. Incorporated 1907.
Bethel Presbyterian Church			APRHS 352	1470 Bethel Church Road; 40.5530°N 79.2416°W	Indiana	Organized 1788
Beulah Presbyterian Church		built 1837; NRHP-listed 1975	APRHS 59	40.4469°N 79.8486°W	Churchill	
Big Spring Presbyterian Church		1790	APRHS 197	Big Spring Ave. 40.1733°N 77.3966°W	Newville	Organized 1738
Blacks Graveyard			APRHS 334	Belmont Road; 39.8622°N 77.2722°W	Gettysburg	Site of 1st Presbyterian church in the area
Brookville Presbyterian Church and Manse		1905	NRHP-listed 1982	41.1611°N 79.0833°W	Brookville	
Buffalo Presbyterian Church		1846	APRHS 271; NRHP-listed 1976	40.9631°N 76.9678°W	Lewisburg	
Calvin Presbyterian Church, Zelienople		1901	APRHS 67	40°47′52″N 80°7′53″W	Zelienople	Congregation founded 1845, near Harmony, Pennsylvania
Chestnut Level Presbyterian Church		1785 circa	APRHS 71	Chestnut Level Rd. at River Rd.39.8232°N 76.2152°W	near Quarryville	Founded c. 1734. Photo shows church house
Darlington Reformed Presbyterian Church		1804	APRHS 57	40°48′31″N 80°25′14″W	Darlington	
Deep Run Presbyterian Church		1841 rebuilt	APRHS 39	16 Irish Meeting House Road40.3967°N 75.2059°W	Perkasie	Founded 1732 as “Mr. Tennent's Upper Congregation.”
Derry Presbyterian Church			APRHS 417		Hershey	
Doe Run Presbyterian Church and Cemetery			APRHS 212	3104 Doe Run Church Road39.9490°N 75.7923°W	East Fallowfield Township near Coatesville	
Donegal Presbyterian Church Complex		built 1732; NRHP-listed 1985	APRHS 199	40.1011°N 76.5667°W	East Donegal Township	
East Liberty Presbyterian Church		1818 founded 1932–35 built	APRSR 363	Penn and Highland avenues 40°27′39.7″N 79°55′32.2″W	Pittsburgh	Gothic Revival
East Vincent United Church of Christ		1817	APRHS 60	282 Church Hill Rd. 40.1562°N 75.5678°W	Spring City	Records date to 1733, 1st church 1758
Ebenezer Presbyterian Church			APRHS 330		Lewisville	
Falkner Swamp Reformed Church			APRHS 55		New Hanover	
Fern Cliffe house at Geneva College			APRHS 299	40.7738°N 80.3217°W	Beaver Falls	
First Presbyterian Church, Athens		1881	APRHS 124	622 S Main St. 41.9543°N 76.5178°W	Athens	Organized 1812 as a Congregational church, 1823 Presbyterian, 1827 1st building
First Presbyterian Church, Carlisle		1760	APRHS 54	2A N. Hanover Street; 40.2022°N 77.1893°W	Carlisle	In Carlisle Historic District
First Presbyterian Church, Lancaster		1851	APRHS 37	140 East Orange St.40.0397°N 76.3027°W	Lancaster	1st church on site 1770
First Presbyterian Church, Milford		founded built		300 Broad St. 41.3233°N 74.8026°W	Milford	1st services in 1825
First Presbyterian Church, New Castle		1896	APRHS 105	US 224. 41.0022°N 80.3475°W	New Castle	Organized 1801, 1st church 1804. Zachary Taylor visited in 1849
First Presbyterian Church, Philadelphia					Philadelphia	Building pictured used until the 1920s
First Presbyterian Church, Washington		1793 founded		40.1697°N 80.2420°W	Washington	
First Presbyterian Church, West Chester		1832	NRHP-listed 1972		West Chester	Designed by Thomas U. Walter
First Presbyterian Church, Wilkes-Barre		1887		97 S Franklin St. 41.2455°N 75.8858°W	Wilkes-Barre	In River Street Historic District
First Presbyterian Church, York		1861	founded before 1759	225 East Market Street	York	In York Historic District
Forks of the Brandywine Presbyterian Church		1875	APRHS 76	1648 Horseshoe Pike 40.0605°N 75.8095°W	Glenmoore	1st church 1734
Frankfort Presbyterian Church		1876	APRHS 81	40°29′5″N 80°26′27″W	Hookstown	Congregation founded 1790
Gettysburg Presbyterian Church		founded built	APRHS 94		Gettysburg	
Gilgal Presbyterian Church			APRHS 85		Marion Center	
Great Conewago Presbyterian Church		built 1787; NRHP-listed 1974		39.8875°N 77.1627°W	Hunterstown	
Greersburg Academy		1804	APRHS 47; NRHP #75001616	40°48′36″N 80°25′25″W	Darlington	First academy west of Pittsburgh, founded by the Presbyterian Church
Guinston United Presbyterian Church		built 1773; NRHP-listed 1976	APRHS 35		Laurel, Pennsylvania	
Irvine United Presbyterian Church		built NRHP-listed			Brokenstraw Township	
Kylertown Presbyterian Church		1854	APRHS 186	PA 1011 (South of Main St.)40.9919°N 78.1670°W	Kylertown	
Leiper Presbyterian Church			APRHS 229	900 Fairview Road39.8871°N 75.3467°W	Swarthmore	Closed 2012, now a Ukrainian Catholic Church
Lower Marsh Creek Presbyterian Church		1790	APRHS 166	1865 Knoxlyn Road; 39.8119°N 77.3219°W	Orrtanna	
Middle Octorara Presbyterian Church		1754	APRHS 122		Quarryville	
Middle Spring Presbyterian Church, Shippensburg, PA			APRHS 104	SR 4001, 2.6 miles N of Shippensburg; 40.0816°N 77.5411°W	Shippensburg	
Mill Creek Presbyterian Church Cemetery			APRHS 14	40°34′20″N 80°28′48″W	Hookstown	Founded in 1784
Mingo Creek Presbyterian Church and Churchyard		1831	NRHP-listed 1992	40.2289°N 79.9972°W	Courtney	
Monaghan Presbyterian Church		1847	APRHS 155	1185 Gettysburg Pike	Dillsburg	organized 1760, cemetery 1782, address is for new church built 2003
Mt. Pleasant Presbyterian Church			APRSR #68	40°48′43″N 80°25′25″W	Darlington	
New Berlin Presbyterian Church			NRHP-listed 1973		New Berlin	
Neshaminy-Warwick Presbyterian Church			APRHS 87		Hartsville	founded by William Tennent
Numine Presbyterian Church			APRHS 333		Nu Mine	
Newtown Presbyterian Church		built NRHP-listed			Newtown	
North & Southampton Reformed Church			APRHS 28		Churchville	
Old First Reformed Church			APRHS 45		Philadelphia	
Old Hanover Presbyterian Churchyard		founded 1736, last church torn down 1875	APRHS 121		Grantville	Walled graveyard, possible site of 1774 Hanover Resolves
Oxford Presbyterian Church		1866	APRHS 72		Oxford	Organized 1754
Old Norriton Presbyterian Church		built 1698; NRHP-listed 1979	APRHS 32	U.S. Route 422; 40.1583°N 75.3736°W	Norristown	
Overbrook Presbyterian Church			APRHS 325		Philadelphia	
Paxtang Presbyterian Church			APRHS 24		Paxtang	
Paxton Presbyterian Church			APRHS 46		Harrisburg	
Pigeon Creek Presbyterian Church			APRHS 6		Eighty-Four	
Robert Kennedy Memorial Presbyterian Church		built 1871; NRHP-listed 2009	11799 Mercersburg Rd.	39.7642°N 77.8524°W	Montgomery Township, Franklin County	Cemetery 1774, named for 1802-1843 pastor
Rocky Spring Presbyterian Church		built 1794; NRHP-listed 1994		39.9886°N 77.6764°W	Franklin County	
Saltsburg Presbyterian Church			APRHS 213		Saltsburg	
Service United Presbyterian Church			APRHS 49	40°34′45″N 80°22′12″W	Aliquippa	Founded by John Anderson
Shadyside Presbyterian Church		1889 built 1975 NRHP-listed	APRHS 30	Amberson Avenue and Westminster Place; 40°26′57″N 79°56′21″W	Pittsburgh	Richardsonian Romanesque
Slate Lick United Presbyterian Church Cemetery			APRHS 421		South Buffalo	
Tenth Presbyterian Church		1829 founded 1856 completed		17th & Spruce Streets; 39°56′49.19″N 75°10′11.52″W	Philadelphia	
Third, Scots & Mariners Presbyterian Church			APRHS 27		Philadelphia	
Third Presbyterian Church		1872		Ninth and Potter Street	Chester, Pennsylvania	Gothic Revival architecture, designed by Isaac Pursell
Trinity Presbyterian Church		1892	APRHS 340	640 Berwyn Avenue	Berwyn	1st church built 1862
Tyrone Presbyterian Church		1871		402 Jimtown Road	Dawson	Founded 1774, Four Churches have been built on the site of the present-day Building.
Union Presbyterian Church & Cemetery			APRHS 376		Cowansville	
Upper Octorara Presbyterian Church		1840	APRHS 31	1120 Octorara Trail39.9736°N 75.9215°W	Parkesburg	Organized 1720
Upper Tuscarora Presbyterian Church & Cemetery			APRHS 356		Waterloo	
Warrior Run Presbyterian Church		built NRHP-listed	APRHS 249		McEwensville	State Historical Marker
