= Isaac Cline (unionist) =

Isaac Cline (January 12, 1835 – 1906) was an American labor unionist.

Born in Winslow Township, New Jersey, Cline worked in a window glass factory, later working in Ohio and Pennsylvania. In the 1850s, he joined the new Window Glass Blowers' Union. During the United States Civil War, he raised a company of volunteers, and served in the 100th Pennsylvania Infantry Regiment.

After the war, Cline returned to window glass blowing, and in 1866, he represented his union at the National Labor Union convention. He later joined the Knights of Labor, and was president of a local of window glass workers. He and Andrew Burtt traveled to Europe in 1884, to organize window glass workers there, particularly in Belgium. He founded the Universal Federation of Window Glass Workers, and was elected as the first president.
