= Cowansville (disambiguation) =

Cowansville may refer to:

- Cowansville, a city in Quebec, Canada
- Cowansville, Pennsylvania, Unincorporated community in Pennsylvania, US
