= Mary Boyd =

Mary Boyd may refer to:

- Mary D. R. Boyd (1809–1899), American author of children's books
- Mary Syme Boyd (1910–1997), Scottish artist and sculptor
- Mary Boyd (mistress), 15th-century mistress of King James IV of Scotland
- Mary Nolan (artist) (née Boyd; 1926–2016), Australian ceramicist, painter and photographer
