= Brokenstraw =

Brokenstraw may refer to:

- Brokenstraw Creek, a tributary of the Allegheny River
- Brokenstraw Township, Warren County, Pennsylvania
