= Joseph Chambers =

Joseph Chambers may refer to:

- Joseph Chambers (politician) (1815–1884), Australian politician
- Joseph B. Chambers (1833–1909), American soldier and Medal of Honor recipient
- Joseph Bernard Chambers (1859–1931), New Zealand sheepfarmer, viticulturist and wine-maker
- Joseph N. Chambers, American politician and army officer
- Joe Chambers (born 1942), American jazz drummer
- Joe Chambers (musician) (1954–2022), American musician, songwriter, record producer
- Joe Chambers (singer), member of The Chambers Brothers
- Joe Chambers (basketball) (born 1982), American wheelchair basketball player
