= Church of the Covenant (Pennsylvania) =

Presbyterian Church in Pennsylvania, US

Coordinates: 40.17220°N 80.23942°W

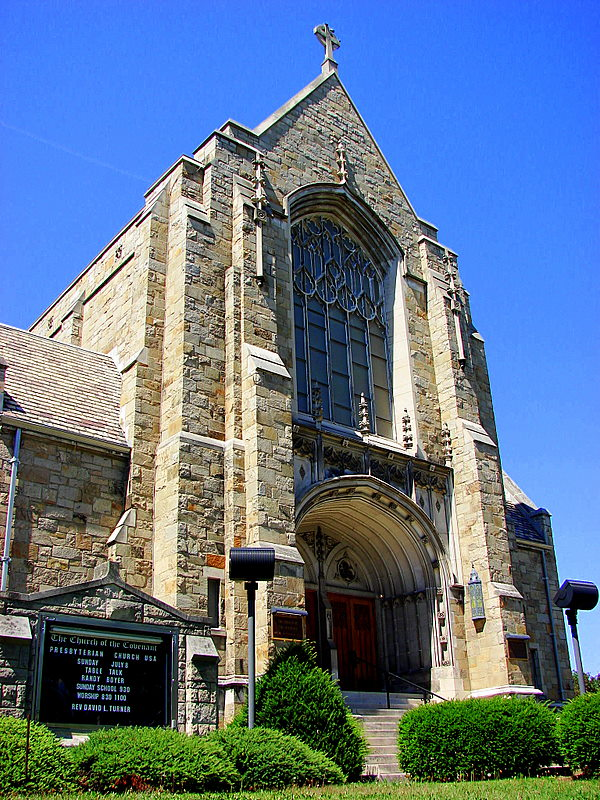

Religion
- Affiliation: Presbyterian
- Year consecrated: circa 1929
- Status: active

Location
- Location: Washington, Pennsylvania, U.S.A.

Architecture
- Style: Gothic Revival architecture
- Materials: stone

Website
- Official website

Church of the Covenant is a Presbyterian Church located in Washington, Pennsylvania. It operates under the Presbyterian Church U.S.A. denomination under the Synod of the Trinity and the Presbytery of Washington. The church has historically maintained a strong relationship with the neighboring Washington & Jefferson College. The church was founded through the 1960 merger of the Second Presbyterian Church, which was itself a daughter work of the First Presbyterian Church 1793, and the Third Presbyterian Church.

== Congregational history ==
=== Second Presbyterian Church ===
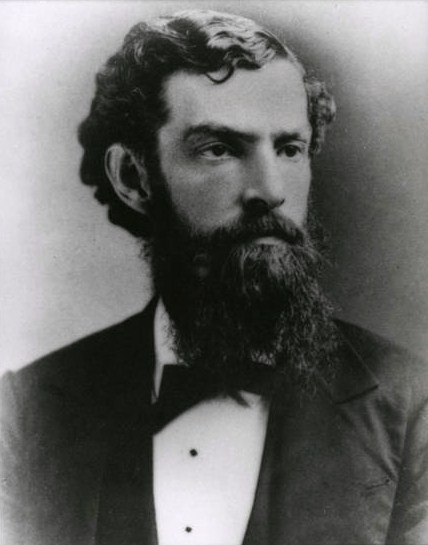
George P. Hays was an early and influential minister.

On March 12, 1861, the Presbytery of Washington organized the Second Presbyterian Church because the First Presbyterian Church of Washington had outgrown its facilities. The split, which saw 36 members leave the First Presbyterian Church to join the Second, was reportedly "attended with expressions of the best Christian feeling" between the congregations. Because of the American Civil War, the two congregations continued to worship together until 1864. The Second Presbyterian Church leased a church building from a Methodist Protestant building on Beau Street. In 1870, George P. Hays became "stated supply", while also serving as President of the neighboring Washington & Jefferson College. He focused on preaching and left the administration of the church in the capable hands of the members. Hays served until 1881, when he moved to take a pastorate in Colorado.

The congregation stayed in that building for 14 years before beginning a construction project in 1884, with a fund of $25,000. The new building at 65 East Beau Street was dedicated on March 6, 1887, with Hays returning to give the sermon. The building featured a Johnson Pipe Organ and a 450-seat auditorium with a groined ceiling and bowled floor and an adjacent lecture room.

The church outgrew that building by 1929 and constructed a new Gothic Revival style building on East Beau Street, the building that now houses the Church of the Covenant.

Judge John Addison McIvaine was a prominent church member. The church was home to three important revivals in its history.

The church had a historically strong tie with the college, as a number of its men attended Wednesday evening prayer meetings and 75 to 100 attending Sunday service. Many of these students eventually joined the ministry or became missionaries.

=== Third Presbyterian Church and merger ===
On March 24, 1891, the Presbytery of Washington organized the Third Presbyterian Church, composed of members of the First and Second Presbyterian Church. The new church constructed a facility on Jefferson Avenue. In 1959, the Third Presbyterian Church's efforts to construct a new building were frustrated, which necessitated its merger with the Second Presbyterian Church. A merger of the two church was agreed to by both congregations and the Church of the Covenant was formally established on September 11, 1960.

Graphical timeline showing the development of Presbyterian Churches in Washington, Pennsylvania.

== See also ==
- First Presbyterian Church 1793
- Washington Presbytery

== Bibliography ==
- The Church of the Covenant, 1960: The Second Presbyterian Church, 1861-1961; The Third Presbyterian Church,1891-1961. The Church of the Covenant. 1961.
- Hays, George Price (1876). History of the Second Presbyterian Church, Washington, Penn'a. Swan & Ecker. p. 22.
