= Mary D. R. Boyd =

American children's author

- Born: Mary Deborah Rebecca McCorkle; September 26, 1809; Philadelphia, Pennsylvania, U.S.
- Died: March 16, 1899 (aged 89); Parkesburg, Pennsylvania, U.S.
- Resting place: Upper Octorara Presbyterian Church Cemetery, Sadsbury Township, Chester County, Pennsylvania
- Occupation: Author
- Spouse: Joseph Cowan Boyd (m. 1835; died 1878)
- Writing career
- Language: English
- Genre: children's literature

Mary D. R. Boyd (née, McCorkle; September 26, 1809 – March 16, 1899) was an American author of children's literature from Pennsylvania. The daughter of a newspaper editor, she was educated in Philadelphia and developed a love of literature early on. Boyd began writing poetry by the age of 12 and later became a teacher. She was a prolific contributor to periodicals and authored a large number of books for youthful readers, at least 32 or which were for use in Sunday schools.

== Early life and education ==
Mary Deborah Rebecca McCorkle was born in Philadelphia in 1809. She is the daughter of William McCorkle, for many years editor of the Freeman's Journal of Philadelphia, who was born in Wilmington, Delaware, on the July 4, 1776, and whose ancestors belonged to the clan of the MacTorqhuil Dhu, in the Scottish Highlands. Her mother was Catherine (Snowden) McCorkle.

Boyd was fond of books from her earliest recollection, and in childhood became acquainted with the classic authors in her father's library; and thus laid the foundation upon which her successful literary career was established. For awhile she attended the best schools in Wilmington, but the death of her father and the removal of the family to Philadelphia deprived her of this advantage, and she was obliged to continue her studies without the aid of a teacher, which she did so successfully that she acquired a knowledge of polite literature and several ancient and modern languages. She began to write poetry at a very early age, and some of her poems were published when she was only twelve years old.

== Career ==
In 1832, she engaged in teaching in the Mantua Female Academy, Chester County, Pennsylvania under the direction of the Rev. James Latta, pastor of Upper Octorara Presbyterian Church, and remained there three years. In 1835, she married Joseph Cowan Boyd (1799-1878), a great-grandson of Rev. Adam Boyd, the first pastor of Upper Octoraro Church. He inherited some of the old Penn patent land, and he was a successful farmer. He was also active in educational matters, filling the office of school director. The couple had five children: Catherine S., William Wallace, Mariana; Joseph C., and James S.

Since 1870, Boyd contributed much to Arthur's Lady's Home Magazine, the juvenile papers of the American Sunday-School Union, and those of the Presbyterian Board of Publication, besides writing a large number of books for youthful readers. She published at least 32 books designed for the use of Sunday schools.

By 1893, Boyd was residing in Sadsbury Township, Chester County, Pennsylvania.

Mary Boyd died in Parkesburg, Pennsylvania, March 16, 1899.

== Publications ==
- Annie Lee, 1827
- Blind Ruth, 1857
- Hazleglen, 1857
- Christmas Eve, 1857
- Seventy Times Seven, 1857
- Charlie, 1857
- Little Bob True, 1858
- Kind Words, 1859
- Who is My Neighbor?, 1859
- Words of Wisdom, 1860
- Jonny Wright, the Boy Who Did Right, 1861
- Homes of the West, 1864
- The Five Gifts and Harry's Honest Penvies, 1864
- Country Sights and Sounds for Little Eyes and Ears, 1864
- Autumn Days, a Sequel to Country Sights and Sounds, 1864
- Bertie and His Best Things, 1865
- A series entitled Grand-mamma's Pockets, seven in number, the initial letter of each title forming the word pockets, viz: Persevering Dick, Our Little Fruit Gatherers, Caring for God's Sparrows, Kitty's Knitting Needles, Every Little Helps, The Will and the Way and Seaside Rambles, 1866
- Tim, the Collier Boy, 1869
- I Have and O Had I,1869
- Sweet Herbs, 1869
- Stepping Stories Over the Brook, 1869
- Barby's Shuttle and What It Wrought, 1869
- The Three Rules: The Iron Rule, The Ride of Self and The Golden Rule, 1870
- Nat Adams or The Young Machinist and His Old Proverbs, 1876
- Grace Ashleigh's Life Work, 1877
- A Good Name A Gooilly Heritage, 1879
