= William Swan Plumer =

American clergyman, theologian and author

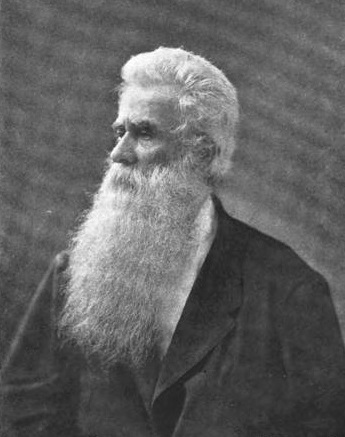
William Swan Plumer, American clergyman, author and religious educator.

William Swan Plumer (July 26, 1802 – October 22, 1880) was an American clergyman, theologian and author who was recognized as an intellectual leader of the Presbyterian Church in the 1800s.

== Early life ==
William S. Plumer was born to William and Catharine Plumer (née McAlester) in Greersburg, present day Darlington, Pennsylvania, on July 26, 1802. He graduated from Washington College (now Washington and Lee University in Virginia) in 1825, received his religious education at Princeton Theological Seminary in New Jersey, and was ordained in the Presbyterian Church. He was licensed in the Presbytery of New Brunswick, a Presbytery in New Jersey, as a clergyman in 1826, and the state's Orange Presbytery ordained him as an evangelist in 1827.

== Career as clergyman ==
Plumer was the minister of several churches during his career, most notably: First Presbyterian Church, Richmond, Virginia (1834–1846); Franklin Street Presbyterian Church, Baltimore, Maryland (1847–1854); Central Presbyterian Church, Allegheny, Pennsylvania (1854–1862); Arch Street Presbyterian Church, Philadelphia, Pennsylvania (1862–1865); and Second Presbyterian Church, Pottsville, Pennsylvania (1865–1867).

From 1837 to 1845 Plumer was the editor of The Watchman of the South, a weekly Presbyterian newspaper which he had founded while serving as pastor in Richmond. He was also a founder of Staunton's Institution for the Blind, Deaf, & Dumb.

Plumer moderated the General Assemblies of two different sects of American Presbyterianism, one in the Presbyterian Church of the United States of America in 1838 and in the Presbyterian Church in the United States in 1871. In both institutions he was a staunch supporter of Old School Presbyterianism.

== Career as educator ==
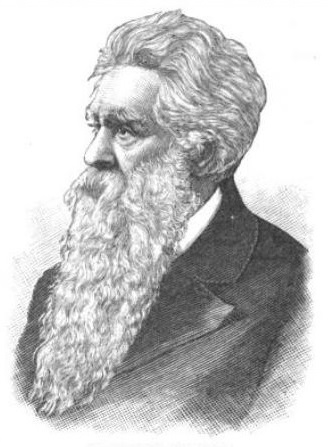
Plumer as depicted in 1884's Encyclopedia of the Presbyterian Church.

In addition to his career in the pulpit, Plumer was a highly regarded religious instructor, and his teaching positions included: Professor at Pittsburgh Theological Seminary in Pennsylvania (1854–1862); Professor of Didactic and Polemic Theology (1867–1875) at Columbia Theological Seminary in South Carolina; and Professor of Pastoral, Casuistic, and Historical Theology (1875–1880) at Columbia.

== Career as author ==
Plumer authored at least 25 books, including commentaries on Romans, Hebrews, and Psalms, as well as numerous tracts and pamphlets, and magazine and newspaper articles. Many of his articles were published anonymously, so the number of writings he produced cannot be calculated with accuracy.

== Death and burial ==
Plumer died in Baltimore on October 22, 1880, due to complications which arose after having surgery to remove kidney stones. He was buried at Hollywood Cemetery in Richmond.

== Family ==
In 1829 Plumer married a widow, Eliza Garden Hassell, in Hillsboro, North Carolina. She died in 1878 and is also buried at Hollywood Cemetery.

== Honors ==
Plumer was the recipient of several honorary degrees, including: three Doctors of Divinity (D.D.) (Washington & Lee, Lafayette College, and Washington & Jefferson College); and one LL.D. (University of Mississippi).

== Written works ==
(Partial list of works known to be, or presumed to be, authored by William Swan Plumer)

- How to Bring Up Children, 1822
- Scripture Doctrine of a Call to the Work of the Gospel Ministry, 1832
- Am I Self-Deceived?, 1840
- The Bible True, and Infidelity Wicked, 1840
- The Substance of an Argument Against the Indiscriminate Incorporation of Churches and Religious Societies, 1847
- Thoughts on the Religious Instruction of the Negroes of This Country, 3 editions - first published in 1848
- Young Children May Be Truly Pious, 1850
- The Grace of Christ, 3 editions - first published in 1853
- Rome Against the Bible, 1854
- The Law of God, 1864
- Vital Godliness, 5 editions - first published in 1864
- Psalms, 1867
- Studies in the Book of Psalms, 3 editions - first published in 1867
- The Rock of Our Salvation, 3 editions - first published in 1867
- Words of Truth and Love, 1867
- Jehovah-Jireh, 2 editions - first published in 1867
- Earnest Hours, 1869
- Commentary on Paul's Epistle to the Romans, 4 editions - first published in 1870
- The Promises of God, 1872
- Commentary on the Epistle of Paul, the Apostle, to the Hebrews, 2 editions - first published in 1872
- Hints and Helps in Pastoral Theology, 3 editions - first published in 1874
- Truths for the People, 1875
