= Union Township, Washington County, Pennsylvania =

Township in Pennsylvania, US

Union Township
- Township
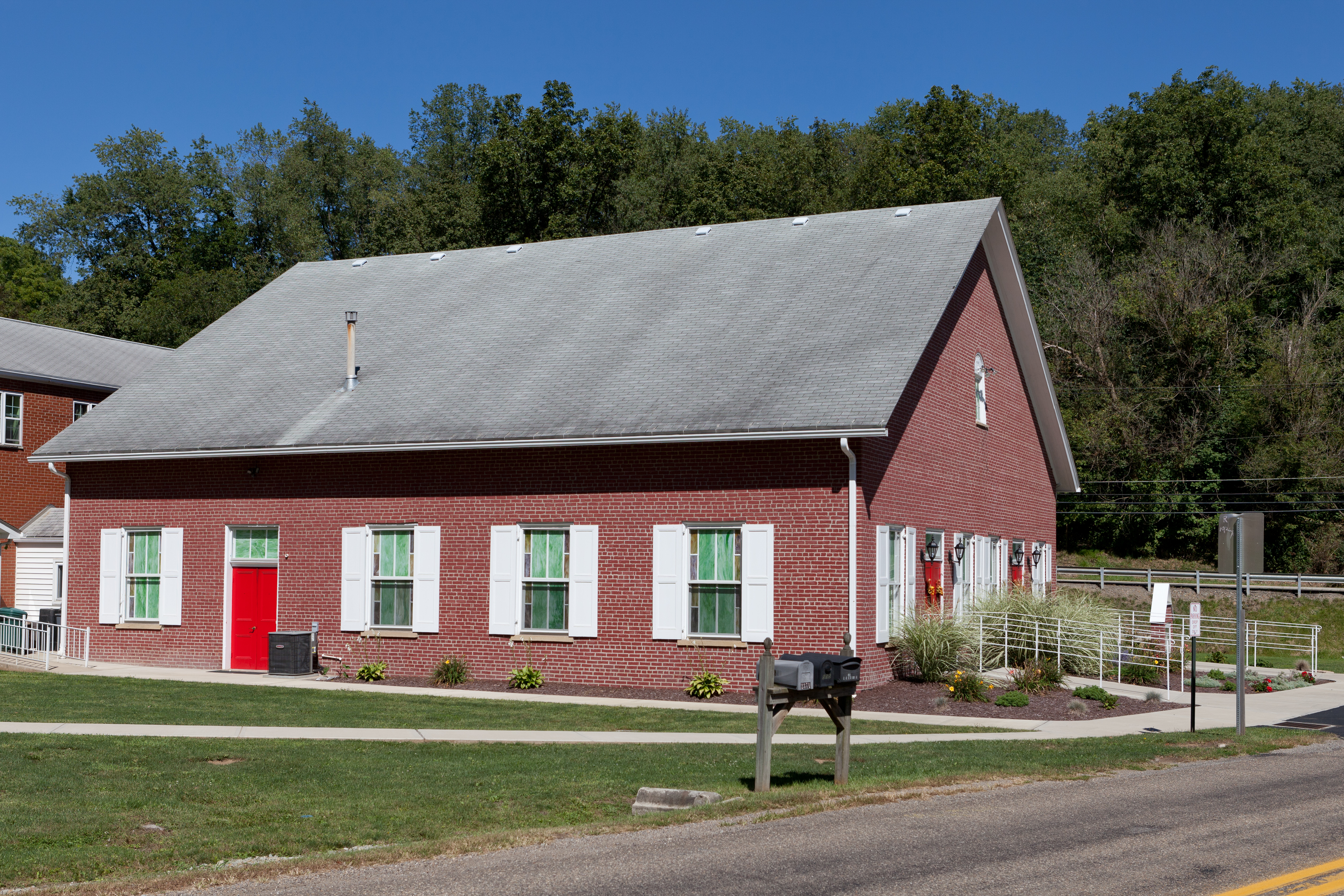
- The historic Mingo Creek Presbyterian Church and Churchyard

- Flag Seal

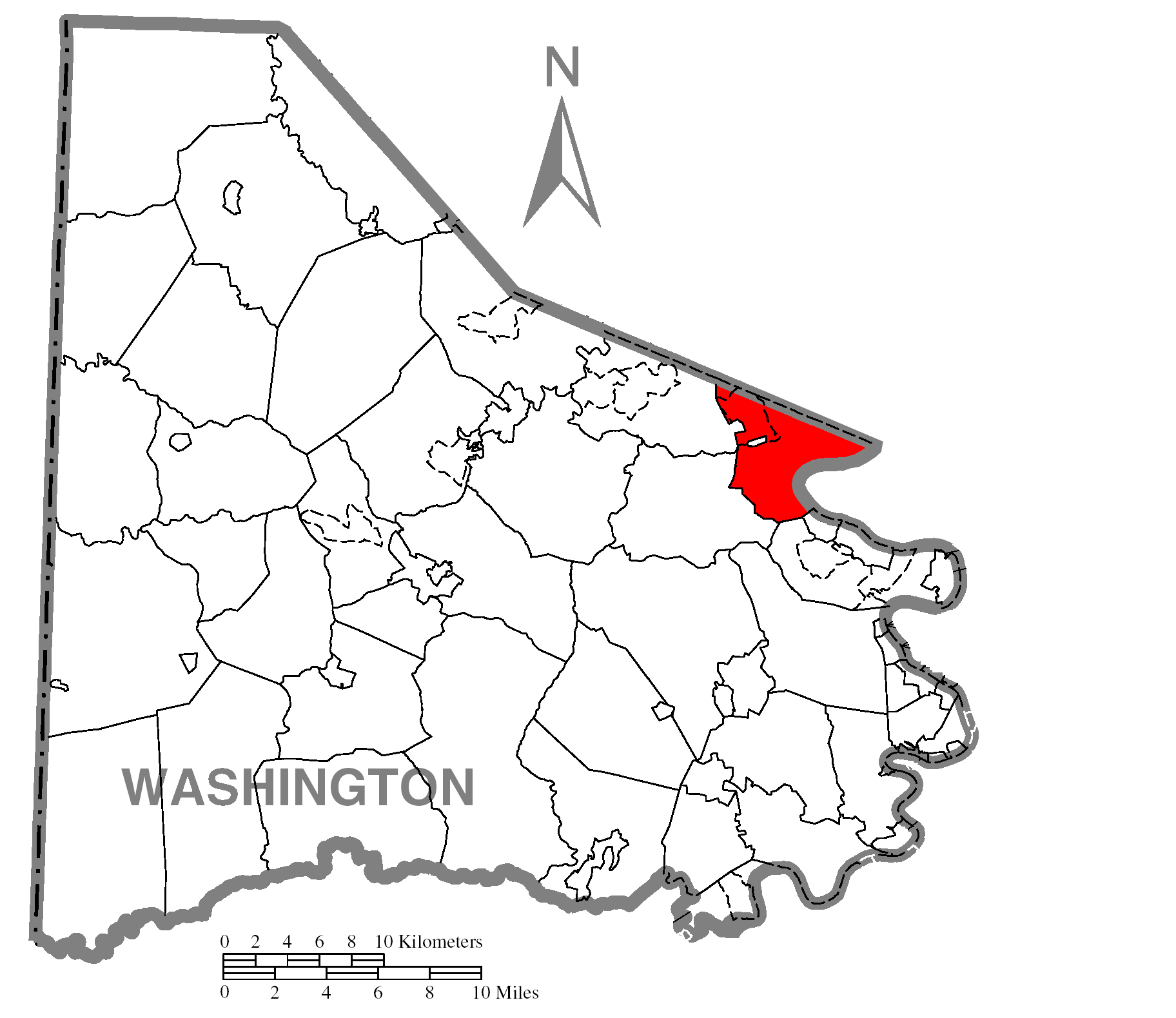
- Location of Union Township in Washington County

- Location of Washington County in Pennsylvania
- Country: United States
- State: Pennsylvania
- County: Washington County
- Established: March 31, 1836

Area
  - Total: 15.75 sq mi (40.79 km^{2})
  - Land: 15.38 sq mi (39.83 km^{2})
  - Water: 0.37 sq mi (0.96 km^{2})

Population (2020)
  - Total: 5,367 ▼
  - Estimate (2021): 5,349
  - Density: 372.2/sq mi (143.72/km^{2})
- Time zone: UTC-4 (EST)
  - Summer (DST): UTC-5 (EDT)
- Area code: 724
- FIPS code: 42-125-78432
- Website: https://uniontwp.com/

Union Township is a township in Washington County, Pennsylvania, United States. The population was 5,367 at the 2020 census.

== History ==
The Dusmal House and Mingo Creek Presbyterian Church and Churchyard are listed on the National Register of Historic Places.

== Geography ==
According to the United States Census Bureau, the township has a total area of 15.7 square miles (40.8 km^{2}), of which, 15.4 square miles (39.8 km^{2}) of it is land and 0.4 square miles (1.0 km^{2}) of it (2.41%) is water.

== Surrounding, adjacent and inner neighborhoods ==
Union Township has five land borders, including South Park Township and Jefferson Hills (both in Allegheny County) to the north, Carroll Township to the south, and Nottingham and Peters Townships to the west. Across the Monongahela River in Allegheny County, Union Township runs adjacent with Forward Township in Allegheny County. The separate borough of Finleyville is located entirely within the west-northwest section of the township. The census-designated place of Elrama is located in the eastern tip of the township, while Gastonville is located long the borer with Peters Township.

== Demographics ==
Historical population
Census	Pop.	Note	%±
2000	5,599		—
2010	5,700		1.8%
2020	5,367		−5.8%
2025 (est.)	5,518		2.8%
U.S. Decennial Census

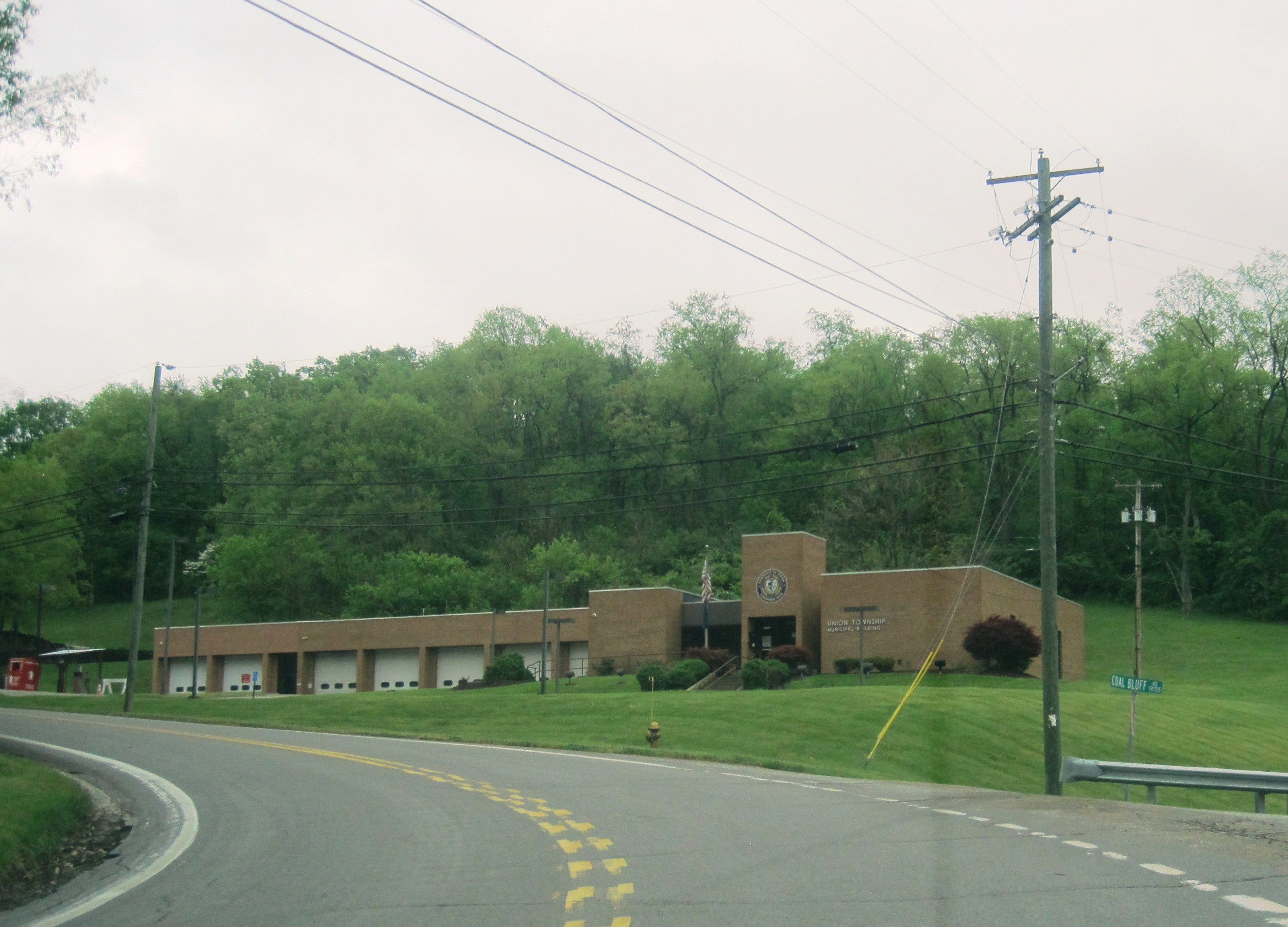
Union Town Hall

At the 2000 census there were 5,599 people, 2,300 households, and 1,674 families living in the township. The population density was 364.3 inhabitants per square mile (140.7/km^{2}). There were 2,376 housing units at an average density of 154.6 per square mile (59.7/km^{2}). The racial makeup of the township was 98.25% White, 0.68% African American, 0.04% Native American, 0.16% Asian, 0.23% from other races, and 0.64% from two or more races. Hispanic or Latino of any race were 0.54%.

Of the 2,300 households 27.5% had children under the age of 18 living with them, 59.0% were married couples living together, 10.7% had a female householder with no husband present, and 27.2% were non-families. 24.0% of households were one person and 12.0% were one person aged 65 or older. The average household size was 2.43 and the average family size was 2.88.

The age distribution was 21.0% under the age of 18, 5.7% from 18 to 24, 28.6% from 25 to 44, 26.9% from 45 to 64, and 17.8% 65 or older. The median age was 42 years. For every 100 females, there were 95.4 males. For every 100 females age 18 and over, there were 91.9 males.

The median household income was $41,962 and the median family income was $50,858. Males had a median income of $40,583 versus $21,882 for females. The per capita income for the township was $19,560. About 3.2% of families and 4.9% of the population were below the poverty line, including 7.3% of those under age 18 and 6.1% of those age 65 or over.

== Notable people ==
- Al Helfer, radio sportscaster.
