= Washington Presbytery =

- Classification: Presbyterian Church (U.S.A.)
- Region: Washington and Greene Counties
- Official website: http://www.washpres.org/

Washington Presbytery, of the Presbyterian Church (USA) is the association of PCUSA churches in Washington and Greene counties in Pennsylvania.

It contains 44 churches and 4,485 members (2022).

== History ==
It was formed from portions of the Presbytery of Ohio by the Synod of Pittsburgh on October 19, 1819, at a meeting at Three Ridges (later West Alexander). During that meeting, participants determined that the college at Washington would be assigned to the new Presbytery while the borough and congregation of Washington would remain within the Presbytery of Ohio. Representing a territory of more than six thousand square miles, the new Presbytery was composed of nineteen congregations: Cross Creek, Mill Creek, Flats, Cross Roads, Three Springs, Upper Buffalo, Lower Buffalo, Upper Ten Mile, Lower Ten Mile, Three Ridges, Short Creek, Forks of Wheeling, Wheeling, East Buffalo, Wolf Run, Unity, Wellsburgh, Waynesburgh, and Crab Apple. Services were already regularly being held at churches in Claysville, Waynesburgh, Wellsburgh, and Wheeling.

By April 1821, communicants in the new Presbytery numbered 1,659, and the amount donated for missionary support was $560.83.

In 1824, the church at Washington, which was overseen by the Rev. Obadiah Jennings, was transferred to the new Presbytery, as were the churches at Mt. Nebo and Pigeon Creek on December 20, 1831.

In 1863, the General Assembly revised the new Presbytery's southern boundary to align it with Pennsylvania's southern border and with the Ohio River. As part of this change, the churches of Bethel, Hughes River, Pennsboro, and Sistersville were transferred to the West Virginia Presbytery.

It is currently part of the Synod of the Trinity.

Counties in the Washington, shown in blue. Counties in the Synod of the Trinity shown in red.

== See also ==
- Church of the Covenant (Pennsylvania)
- First Presbyterian Church 1793
- Mingo Creek Presbyterian Church and Churchyard
