= Daniel Leasure =

- Born: March 18, 1819; Westmoreland County, Pennsylvania
- Died: October 10, 1886 (aged 67); St. Paul, Minnesota
- Burial place: New Castle, Pennsylvania
- Military career
- Allegiance: United States of America; Union
- Branch: United States Army; Union Army
- Service years: 1861–64
- Rank: Colonel; Brevet Brigadier General
- Commands: 100th Pennsylvania Infantry Regiment; 3rd Brigade, 1st Division, IX Corps; 2nd Brigade, 1st Division, IX Corps
- Conflicts: American Civil War: Battle of Secessionville; Second Battle of Bull Run; Battle of Chantilly; Battle of Fredericksburg; Siege of Vicksburg; Battle of the Wilderness; Battle of Spotsylvania Court House
- Other work: Physician, politician, trustee of Greersburg Academy

Daniel Leasure (March 18, 1819 – October 10, 1886) was an American soldier and medical doctor who served as a colonel and brigade commander in the Union Army during the American Civil War.

== Early life ==
Leasure was born in 1819 near Pittsburgh in Westmoreland County, Pennsylvania. He attended Greersburg Academy in nearby Darlington in Beaver County from 1838 to 1840. Afterwards, he spent time in medical school in Pittsburgh.

== Civil War ==
Leasure held the rank of colonel in the IX Corps through most of the war. His regiment, the 100th Pennsylvania Infantry, was known as the "Roundheads" because it was recruited from descendants of the followers of Oliver Cromwell. The regiment first saw action in the command of Brig. Gen. Isaac I. Stevens at the Battle of Secessionville in South Carolina on June 16, 1862.

Transferred to the Virginia theater of the war, Leasure participated in the Second Battle of Bull Run and the Battle of Chantilly. Wounded at Second Bull Run, he subsequently missed the Maryland Campaign. Leasure returned for the Battle of Fredericksburg where he took command of the 3rd Brigade, 1st Division in the IX Corps.

Moving to the Western Theater with the IX Corps, Leasure continued in brigade command under Maj. Gen. John Parke during the Siege of Vicksburg and Blue Springs. Returning to command of the 100th Pennsylvania, he took part in the Siege of Knoxville. Returning to Virginia, Leasure now commanded the 2nd Brigade, 1st Division in the IX Corps at the Battle of the Wilderness and the Battle of Spotsylvania. When division commander Brig. Gen. Thomas G. Stevenson was killed during the fighting at Spotsylvania, Leasure was the ranking subordinate and took command of the division for 3 days until relieved of this capacity by Maj. Gen. Thomas L. Crittenden. Returning to command the 2nd Brigade, Leasure was wounded a few days later and never returned to field command.

He was mustered out of the service on August 30, 1864. He received the brevet rank of brigadier general in 1865.

== Post-war career ==
When the war ended, Leasure returned to Pennsylvania, where he practiced medicine in the borough of Darlington. While in Darlington, Leasure became a trustee of Greersburg Academy where he was educated nearly thirty years before. He later served in the Pennsylvania state legislature, and afterwards, moved to New Castle, Pennsylvania.

Leasure then moved to the city of St. Paul, Minnesota in 1878, where he died eight years later on October 10, 1886. His body was returned to Pennsylvania and was buried in New Castle.

== Monument ==
The borough of Darlington erected a monument the year following Leasure's death. The monument was placed across from the Greersburg Academy school building, where Leasure spent a considerable amount of time in his life. (Other notable Civil War alumni to go through the academy were the abolitionist John Brown and John W. Geary.)
