= Mingo Creek Presbyterian Church and Churchyard =

Historic church in Pennsylvania, United States

- U.S. National Register of Historic Places
- Pennsylvania state historical marker
- Washington County History & Landmarks Foundation Landmark
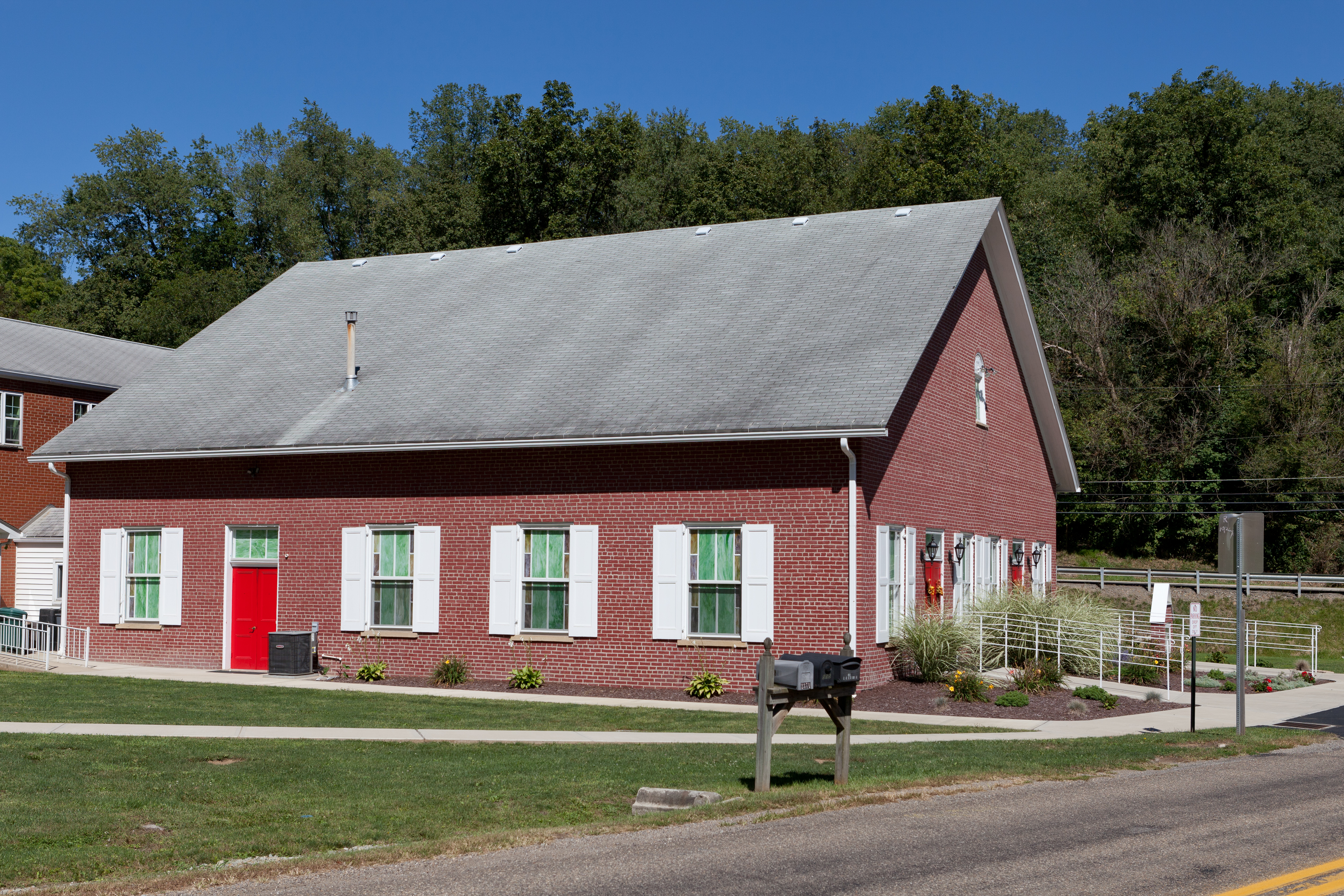

- Location within Pennsylvania Location within the United States
- Nearest city: Courtney, Pennsylvania
- Coordinates: 40°13′44″N 79°59′50″W
- Area: 3 acres (1.2 ha)
- Built: 1793
- MPS: Whiskey Rebellion Resources in Southwestern Pennsylvania MPS
- NRHP reference No.: 92001500

Significant dates
- Added to NRHP: November 12, 1992
- Designated PHMC: March 04, 1994

Mingo Creek Presbyterian Church and Churchyard is a church and historic location in Washington County, Pennsylvania. It is located at the junction of Pennsylvania Route 88 and Mingo Church Road in Union Township, Washington County, Pennsylvania, near Courtney, Pennsylvania. It is a member of the Washington Presbytery.

The original log Presbyterian meetinghouse was built in 1793. The Mingo Creek Society, a group of dissidents founded in February 1794 that became involved in protest against the federal whiskey excise tax, met there. It would serve as a focal point in the development of the Whiskey Rebellion, even becoming the site of militia musters in the fight against federal forces. Some militia members are buried on the grounds, including Major James McFarlane, revolutionary war veteran, mortally wounded at the July 1794 battle of Bower Hill during the climax of the resistance of the Whiskey Rebellion at the residence of John Neville .

In the early years, the church was served by circuit-riding preachers who ministered to the early settlers of the era. Many of the service were held underneath a young oak tree. In 1990, that tree had grown large, but had become infested by ants. In response, the church members removed most of the tree, but left the base of the trunk, which they then carved into a statue of a circuit-riding preacher. "Reverend Stump," as it was called. The stump still stands, but is still plagued by carpenter ants.

In 1994, the Pennsylvania Historical and Museum Commission installed a historical marker noting the historic importance of the location. It was added to the National Register of Historic Places in 1992. It is designated as a historic public landmark by the Washington County History & Landmarks Foundation.

The current church, built in 1831, is a one and a half-story brick building, largely unadorned. It was renovated in 1904, with multi-paned stained glass replacing older windows in 1936. A manse (1924) and a two-story education building (1958) are also on the site but are not part of the national register boundary. The church yard/cemetery, on a high hill to the southwest of the church, contains dated tombstones from 1790.
