= Elrama, Pennsylvania =

Unincorporated community in Pennsylvania, US

Coordinates: 40°15′07″N 79°55′29″W

- census-designated place
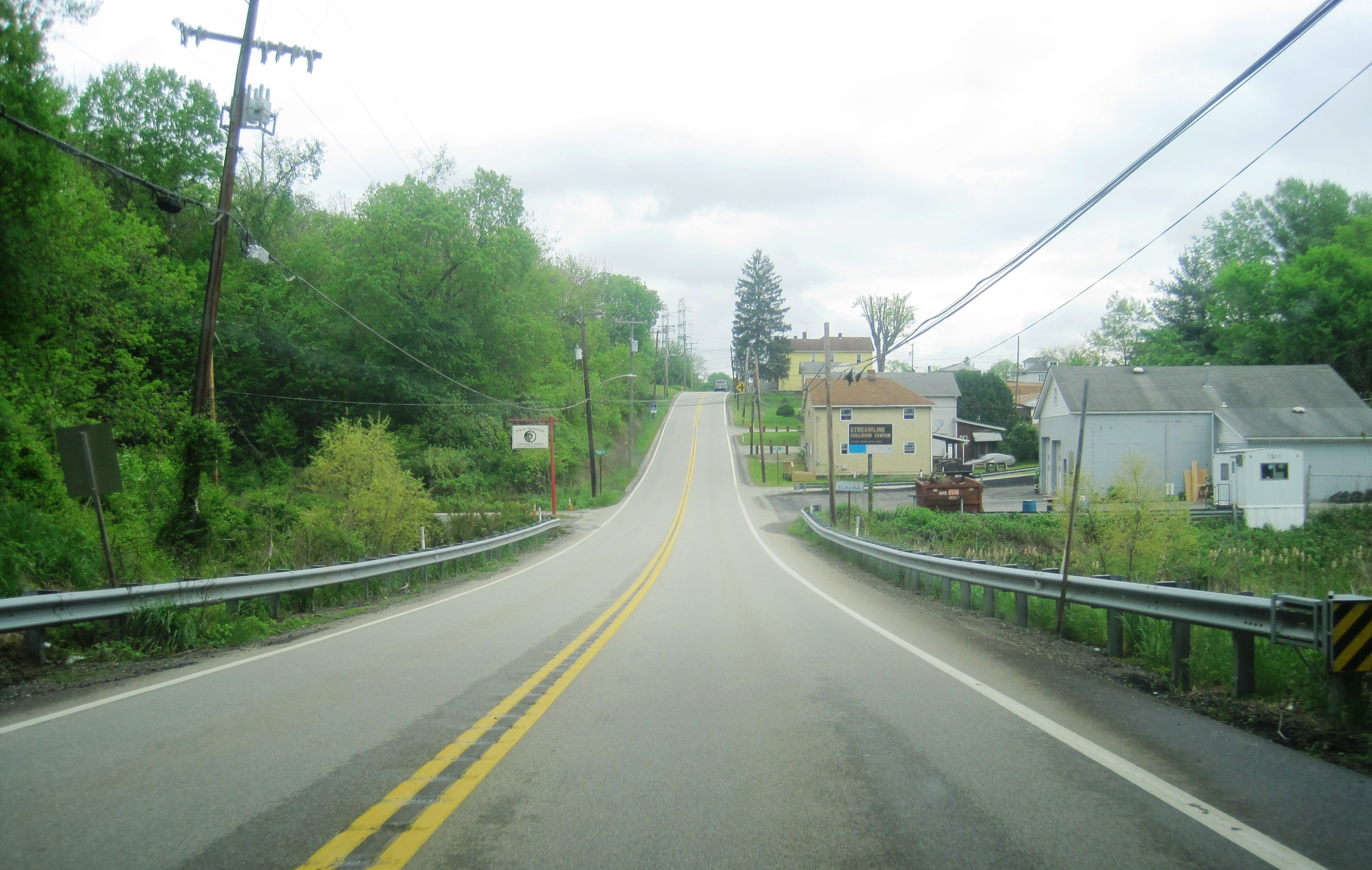
- Elrama along northbound PA 837
- Interactive map of Elrama, Pennsylvania
- Country: United States
- State: Pennsylvania
- County: Washington

Area
  - Total: 0.15 sq mi (0.38 km^{2})
  - Land: 0.15 sq mi (0.38 km^{2})
  - Water: 0 sq mi (0.00 km^{2})

Population (2020)
  - Total: 285
  - Density: 1,947.3/sq mi (751.86/km^{2})
- Time zone: UTC-5 (Eastern (EST))
  - Summer (DST): UTC-4 (EDT)
- FIPS code: 42-23392

Elrama is a census-designated place located in Union Township, Washington County in the state of Pennsylvania. The community is located in the eastern tip of Union Township in Washington County, near the Monongahela River, along Pennsylvania Route 837. As of the 2020 census, the population was 285 residents.

In 2012, the Elrama coal-fired power plant built in the 1950s by Duquesne Light was decommissioned. In 2023, the final steps of demolition were completed.

== Demographics ==
Historical population
Census	Pop.	Note	%±
2010	307		—
2020	285		−7.2%
U.S. Decennial Census

== Notable people ==
- Al Helfer (1911–1975), radio sportscaster
