= Irvine United Presbyterian Church =

Historic church in Pennsylvania, United States

- U.S. National Register of Historic Places
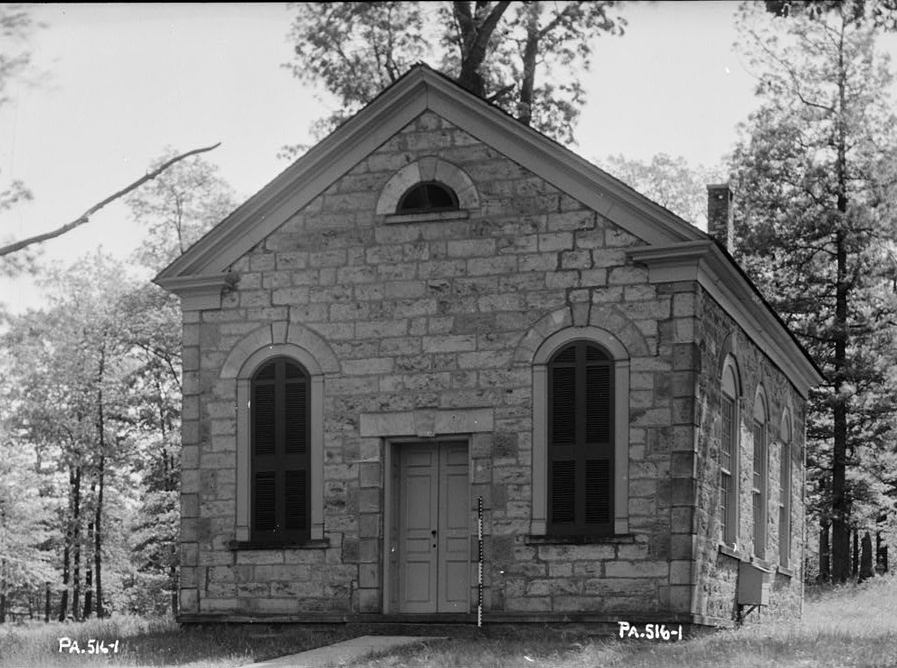
- Irvine United Presbyterian Church, HABS Photo, 1937

- Location within Pennsylvania Location within the United States
- Location: Off U.S. 6, Brokenstraw Township, Pennsylvania
- Coordinates: 41°50′17″N 79°16′16″W
- Area: 2 acres (0.81 ha)
- Built: 1837
- Architect: Shortt, Robert
- Architectural style: Greek Revival
- NRHP reference No.: 76001676
- Added to NRHP: August 27, 1976

The Irvine United Presbyterian Church is an historic Presbyterian church which is located in Brokenstraw Township, Warren County, Pennsylvania.

It was added to the National Register of Historic Places in 1976.

== History and architectural features ==
Built in 1837, this historic structure is a one-story, fieldstone building with a gable roof which was designed in the Greek Revival style. It is three bays wide and three bays deep, measuring twenty-two feet by thirty-two feet.

== Gallery ==
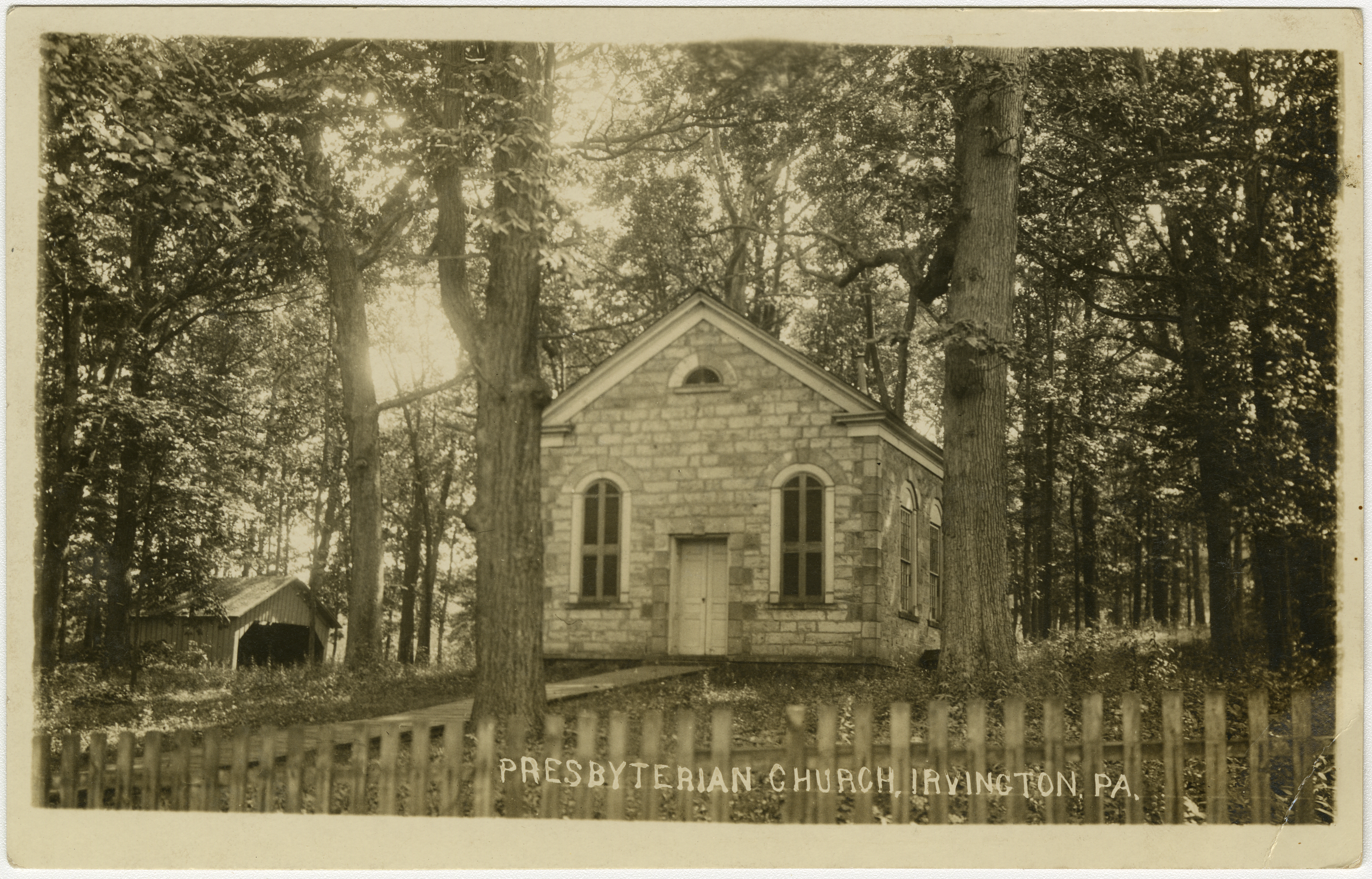
On a pre-1923 postcard

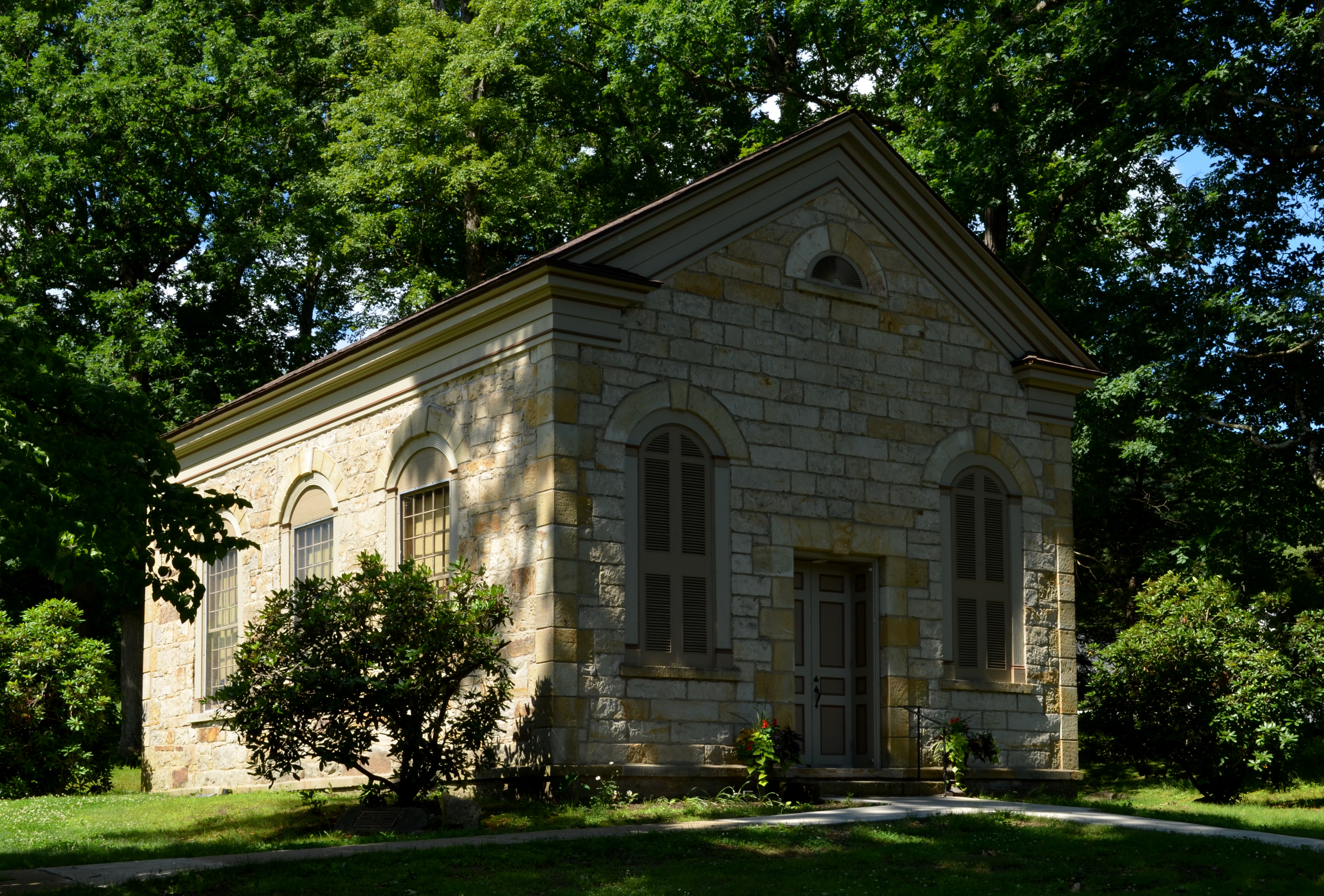
In 2014
