= Greersburg Academy =

- U.S. National Register of Historic Places
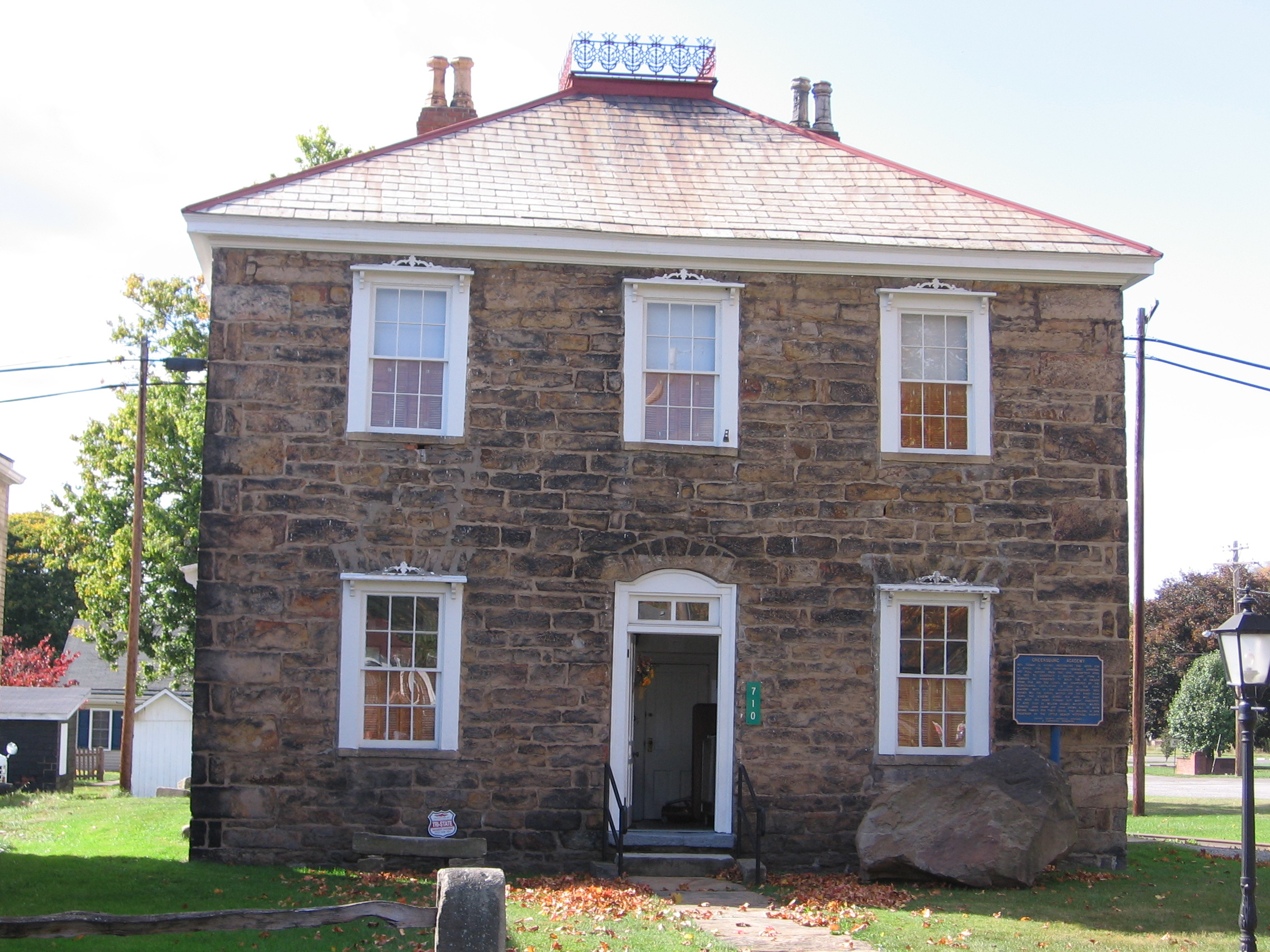
- Greersburg Academy

- Location within Pennsylvania Location within the United States
- Location: Junction of 3rd and Market Sts., Darlington, Pennsylvania, United States
- Coordinates: 40°48′36″N 80°25′25″W
- Area: 0.1 acres (0.040 ha)
- Built: 1806
- Architectural style: Georgian
- NRHP reference No.: 75001616
- Added to NRHP: February 24, 1975

The Greersburg Academy was an educational institution that was established in 1802 in Darlington, Pennsylvania, United States by the Reverend Thomas Hughes.

== History and architectural features ==
The academy was created as a "prep" school for college. Classes included languages, philosophy, and astronomy. Notable alumni of the school included abolitionist John Brown, Walter Forward, John White Geary, Daniel Leasure, William Holmes McGuffey.

The stone structure was built sometime around 1806, making it one of the oldest buildings still standing in Beaver County.

Though it was originally built as a school, the structure functioned as a railway station for a time, serving several railroads between 1883 and 1972.

The structure is one of the oldest structures to have ever been used as a station.

The Little Beaver Historical Society currently maintains the structure.
