= Darlington, Pennsylvania =

Borough in Pennsylvania, US

- Borough
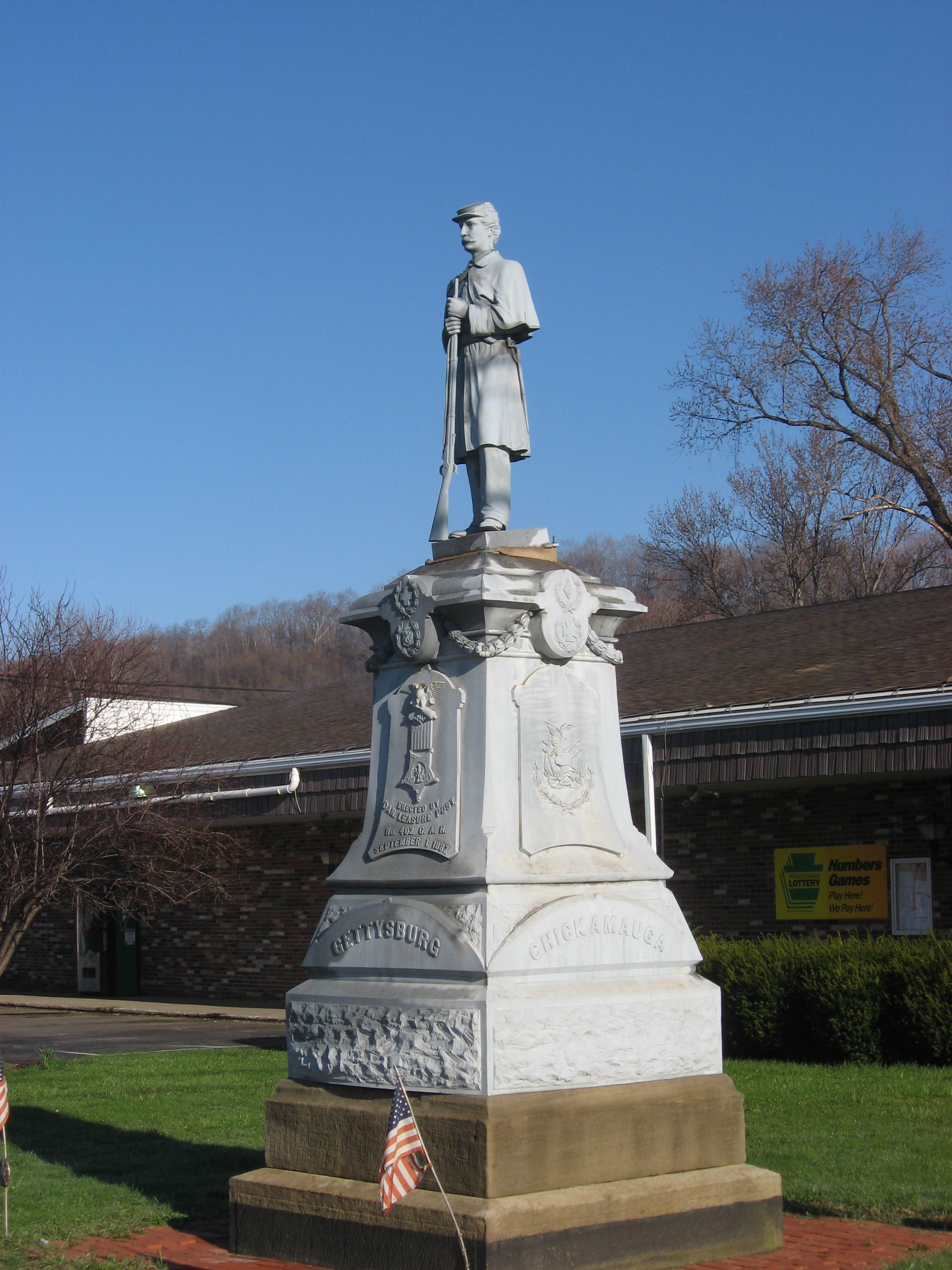
- Veterans Memorial in central Darlington
- Interactive map of Darlington, Pennsylvania
- Location within Pennsylvania Location within the United States
- Coordinates: 40°48′36″N 80°25′24″W
- Country: United States
- State: Pennsylvania
- County: Beaver
- Settled: 1804
- Incorporated: 1820

Government
  - Type: Borough Council

Area
  - Total: 0.081 sq mi (0.21 km^{2})
  - Land: 0.081 sq mi (0.21 km^{2})
  - Water: 0 sq mi (0.00 km^{2})

Population (2020)
  - Total: 249
  - Density: 3,040.2/sq mi (1,173.83/km^{2})
- Time zone: UTC-5 (Eastern (EST))
  - Summer (DST): UTC-4 (EDT)
- Zip code: 16115
- Area code: 724
- FIPS code: 42-18192
- Website: http://darlingtonborough.com/

Darlington is a borough in northwestern Beaver County, Pennsylvania, United States. The population was 249 at the 2020 census. It is a part of the Pittsburgh metropolitan area.

== History ==
Darlington was settled in 1804 and incorporated on March 28, 1820, as Greersburg. The town would subsequently change its name to Darlington on April 6, 1830, due to often being confused by locals with Greensburg, in Westmoreland County. Darlington is named for S. P. Darlington, a merchant from Pittsburgh.

== Geography ==
Darlington is located at 40°48′36″N 80°25′24″W (40.809917, −80.423381). It is completely surrounded by Darlington Township.

According to the United States Census Bureau, the borough has a total area of 0.1 square miles (0.26 km^{2}), all land.

== Demographics ==
Historical population
Census	Pop.	Note	%±
1860	301		—
1870	280		−7.0%
1880	247		−11.8%
1890	254		2.8%
1900	270		6.3%
1910	311		15.2%
1920	347		11.6%
1930	465		34.0%
1940	444		−4.5%
1950	354		−20.3%
1960	306		−13.6%
1970	344		12.4%
1980	377		9.6%
1990	311		−17.5%
2000	299		−3.9%
2010	254		−15.1%
2020	249		−2.0%
2021 (est.)	244	▼	−2.0%

As of the 2000 census, there were 299 people, 122 households, and 79 families residing in the borough. The population density was 3,217.7 inhabitants per square mile (1,242.4/km^{2}). There were 130 housing units at an average density of 1,399.0 per square mile (540.2/km^{2}). The racial makeup of the borough was 97.99% White, 0.67% Asian, 0.67% from other races, and 0.67% from two or more races. Hispanic or Latino of any race were 0.67% of the population.

There were 122 households, out of which 28.7% had children under the age of 18 living with them, 51.6% were married couples living together, 11.5% had a female householder with no husband present, and 35.2% were non-families. 32.0% of all households were made up of individuals, and 16.4% had someone living alone who was 65 years of age or older. The average household size was 2.45 and the average family size was 3.14.

In the borough the population was spread out, with 23.4% under the age of 18, 11.0% from 18 to 24, 26.4% from 25 to 44, 21.1% from 45 to 64, and 18.1% who were 65 years of age or older. The median age was 38 years. For every 100 females, there were 83.4 males. For every 100 females age 18 and over, there were 73.5 males.

The median income for a household in the borough was $30,125, and the median income for a family was $38,750. Males had a median income of $25,625 versus $22,000 for females. The per capita income for the borough was $15,938. About 3.9% of families and 9.2% of the population were below the poverty line, including 10.9% of those under the age of eighteen and 9.7% of those sixty five or over.

== Education ==
Children in Darlington are served by the Blackhawk School District. The current schools serving Darlington are:

- Patterson Primary School – grades K–2
- Blackhawk Intermediate School – grades 3–5
- Highland Middle School – grades 6–8
- Blackhawk High School – grades 9–12

== See also ==
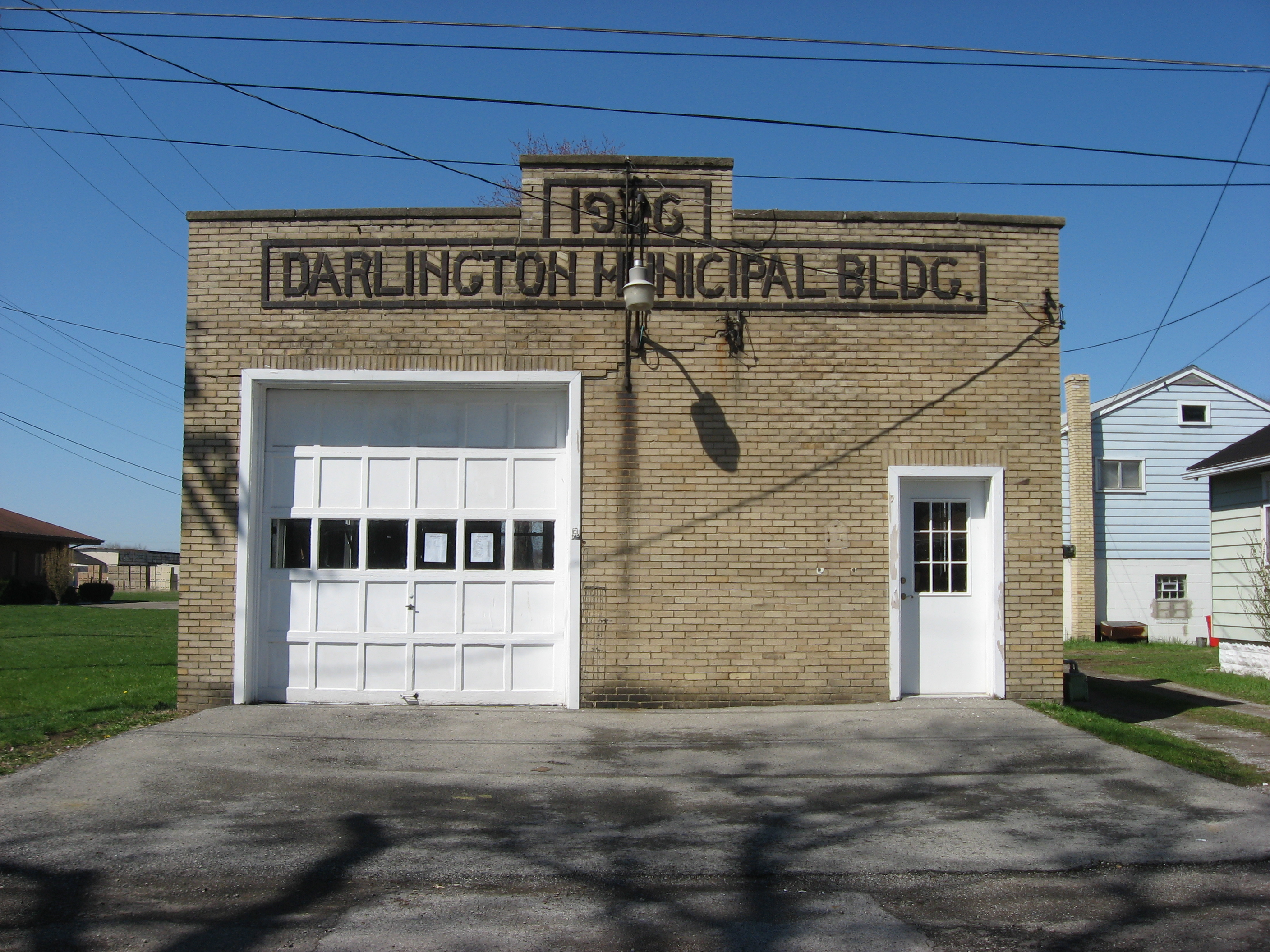
Darlington municipal building

- Greersburg Academy
- Daniel Leasure
- William Swan Plumer
