= Courtney, Pennsylvania =

Village in Pennsylvania, US

Coordinates: 40°13′07″N 79°58′07″W

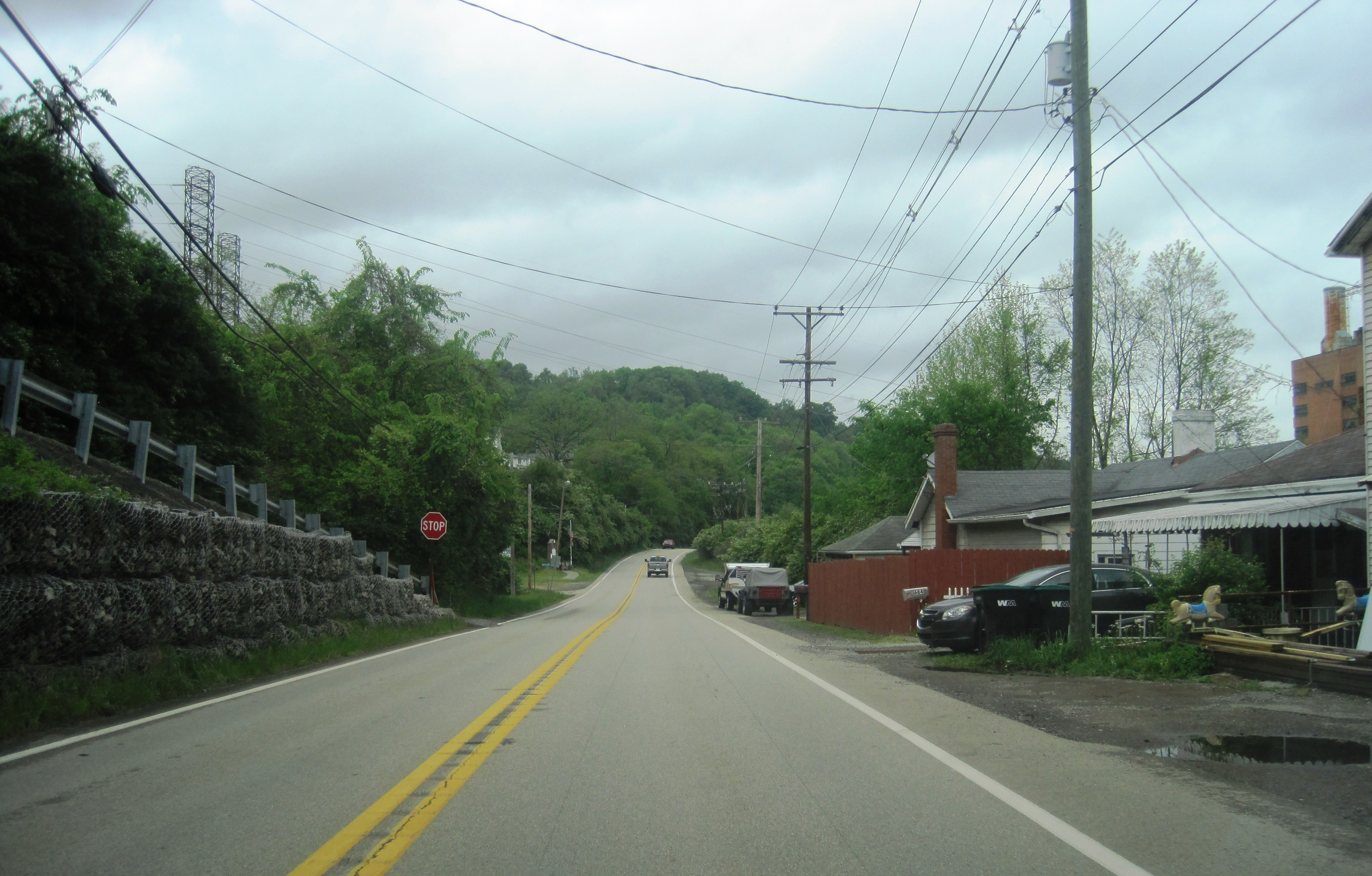
Courtney along northbound PA 837

Courtney is a village of the township of Union in Washington County, Pennsylvania, United States.

== 1913 mine explosion ==
On April 23, 1913, a mine owned by the Monongahela River Coal company experienced an explosion, trapping 250 workers inside. Anywhere from 90 to 125 were reported to have died in the accident.

== Notable natives ==
- Bob Coulson, baseball player
