= First Presbyterian Church (Washington, Pennsylvania) =

Coordinates: 40.16970°N 80.24204°W

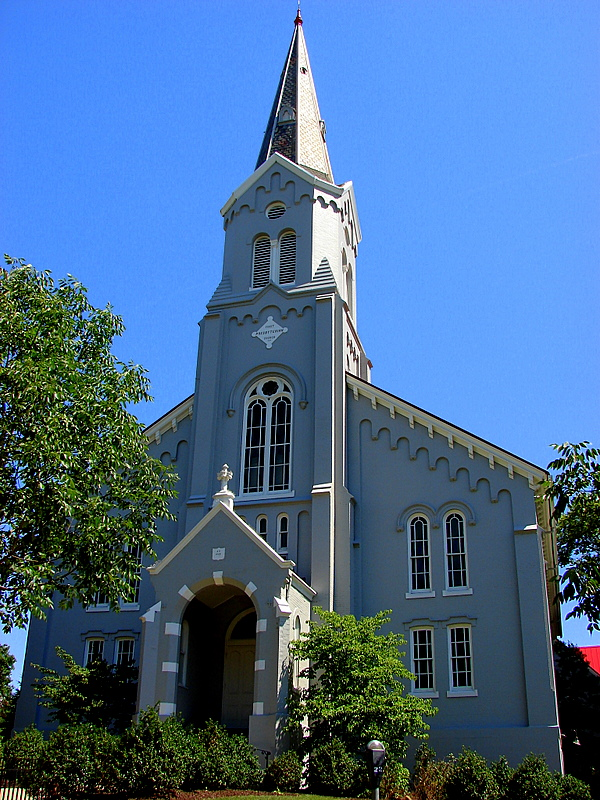

Religion
- Affiliation: Presbyterian
- Status: active

Location
- Location: Washington, Pennsylvania, U.S.A.
- Materials: stone

The First Presbyterian Church 1793, alternatively known as the First Presbyterian Church, is a Presbyterian church in Washington, Pennsylvania. It has been the de facto college church for Washington & Jefferson College since the early 19th century. It is under the Washington Presbytery.

== History ==
It was founded in 1793 under the auspices of the Presbytery of Redstone. Matthew Brown, who was President of Washington Academy at the time, was the first pastor. The congregation first met in the stone academy building of the Washington Academy.

Then, the congregation worshipped at the second courthouse, where the pastor would stand in the judge's bench and preach to the congregation. The congregation acquired its first building in 1806. As Washington progressed beyond the pioneer stage, the townsfolk began to partake in more leisurely activities, including the playing of cards and attending dances. Reverend Matthew Brown gave a rebuke to this immorality in a famous sermon known as the Serpent Sermon.

A second building, in the Greek Revival Architecture style, was built in 1851. It had severe structural flaws and was demolished in 1868.

James I. Brownson, who also served as President Pro Tempore of Washington & Jefferson College, was pastor for over 50 years.

== Ministry ==
The church operates the Matthew Brown Fellowship, a faith-based program that selects several Washington & Jefferson College students with local charitable organizations. In addition to the charity work, Matthew Brown Fellows attend monthly study groups with other Fellows. The program encompasses the Matthew Brown Music Scholars program, which selects two student-musicians to practice and perform with the First Presbyterian Church's choir.

Graphical timeline showing the development of Presbyterian Churches in Washington, Pennsylvania.

== See also ==
- Church of the Covenant (Pennsylvania)

== Bibliography ==
- Brownson, James (1889). "Washington, First". History of the Presbytery of Washington. Philadelphia: Jas. B. Rodgers Printing Co. pp. 306–313.
- Presbyterianism in Washington, Penn'a: the proceedings at the centennial celebration of the organization of the First Presbyterian Church of Washington. Washington, Pennsylvania: Observer Book and Job Rooms. 1993.
- Years of our Lord 1893-1993, First Presbyterian Church, Washington, Pennsylvania: bicentennial history, the second hundred years. 1893.
