= Al Helfer =

American radio sportscaster (1911–1975)

- Helfer broadcasting the Mutual "Game of the Day" in the 1950s
- Born: George Alvin Helfer; September 26, 1911; Elrama, Pennsylvania, U.S.
- Died: May 16, 1975 (aged 63); Sacramento, California, U.S.
- Known for: Sports broadcaster

George Alvin "Al" Helfer (September 26, 1911 – May 16, 1975) was an American radio sportscaster.

Nicknamed "Mr. Radio Baseball", Helfer called the play-by-play of seven World Series, ten All-Star Games, and regular season broadcasts for several teams (among them the New York Yankees, Brooklyn Dodgers and Oakland Athletics) and the Mutual and NBC networks. He also broadcast the Army–Navy Game during the 1940s and '50s and several Rose Bowl games for NBC Radio in the 1950s.

== Early life and career ==
Helfer was born in Elrama, Pennsylvania. He played football and basketball at Washington & Jefferson College, and took his first job as a sports reporter for the Pittsburgh Post-Gazette after graduation, also calling the football games of the Pittsburgh Pirates (as they were then called) and Pittsburgh Panthers for radio station WWSW. He started broadcasting recreations of Pittsburgh Pirates baseball games in 1933.

He joined Red Barber as the regular broadcast team of the Cincinnati Reds in 1935. He left Cincinnati to join CBS in 1937, working a few baseball games and a lot of football games. Helfer was reunited with Barber (who often addressed him on-air as "Brother Al") on the Brooklyn Dodgers broadcasts in 1939. They worked together until 1941, when Helfer joined the U.S. Navy during World War II.

When he returned the Dodgers job was no longer available, so Helfer started doing "Game of the Day" broadcasts for Mutual. He was paired with Dizzy Dean on the network's broadcasts in the early 1950s, though the two men often argued and never got along. He did eventually rejoin the Dodgers for their last years in Brooklyn, calling their final home game and introducing the players to the crowd for the final time. In 1958 Helfer called Philadelphia Phillies games which were broadcast to the New York market by WOR-TV, helping to fill the void of National League baseball left in the city by the departure of the Dodgers and Giants.

He worked a number of teams after that, including the Houston Colt .45s (1962), Denver Broncos (1962–63), and Oakland Athletics (1968–69).

== Awards and honors ==
On December 12, 2018 it was announced Helfer had been awarded the Ford C. Frick Award for Excellence in Baseball Broadcasting from the Baseball Hall of Fame.

== Personal life ==
His second wife was vaudeville performer Ramona; they married on 14 June 1944, and stayed together until her death in December 1972. The following June, he married Sacramento resident Margaret Grabbe, to whom he remained married until his death. He died, aged 63, in Sacramento, California.

== Notable broadcasts ==
- Major League Baseball All-Star Game (1939, 1950–1958)
- World Series (1945, 1951–1955, 1957)
- Rose Bowl Game (1952–1958)
- 1962 National League tie-breaker series
- Catfish Hunter's 1968 perfect game
