= 100th Pennsylvania Infantry Regiment =

Union Army volunteer infantry regiment

100th Regiment Pennsylvania Volunteer Infantry
- Active: August 31, 1861 to July 24, 1865
- Country: United States
- Allegiance: Union
- Branch: Infantry
- Size: 2,014
- Nickname: "Round Head Regiment"
- Engagements: Battle of Secessionville; Second Battle of Bull Run; Battle of Chantilly; Battle of South Mountain; Battle of Antietam; Battle of Fredericksburg; Siege of Vicksburg; Siege of Jackson; Knoxville Campaign; Rapidan Campaign; Battle of the Wilderness; Battle of Spotsylvania Court House; Battle of North Anna; Battle of Totopotomoy Creek; Battle of Cold Harbor; Siege of Petersburg; Battle of the Crater; Battle of Globe Tavern; Battle of Boydton Plank Road; Battle of Fort Stedman; Appomattox Campaign; Third Battle of Petersburg

The 100th Regiment Pennsylvania Volunteer Infantry ("The Roundheads" and "The Round Head Regiment") was an infantry regiment that served in the Union Army during the American Civil War.

== Service ==
The 100th Pennsylvania Infantry was organized at Pittsburgh, Pennsylvania and mustered in on August 31, 1861, for a three-year enlistment under the command of Colonel Daniel Leasure.

The regiment's companies were enlisted largely from the following counties: Washington, Butler, Beaver, Westmoreland with the majority of the men coming from Lawrence. The unit got its nickname, the Round Head Regiment, because its men were primarily from the south-western region of Pennsylvania, which had been colonized by Roundheads around the time of the English Civil War.

The regiment was attached to Stevens' 2nd Brigade, Sherman's South Carolina Expedition, to April 1862. 2nd Brigade, 2nd Division, Department of the South, to July 1862. 2nd Brigade, 1st Division, IX Corps, Army of the Potomac, to September 1863. 3rd Brigade, 1st Division, IX Corps, to April 1863. 3rd Brigade, 1st Division, IX Corps, Department of the Ohio, to June 1863. Army of the Tennessee, to August 1863, and Army of the Ohio, to March 1864. 2nd Brigade, 1st Division, IX Corps, Army of the Potomac, to June 1864. 1st Brigade, 1st Division, IX Corps, to September 1864. 3rd Brigade, 1st Division, IX Corps, to July 1865.

The 100th Pennsylvania Infantry mustered out July 24, 1865.

== Detailed service ==
The 100th, known as the Round Head Regiment, was recruited in the southwestern part of the state in August 1861, and ordered to Washington on September 2, where its organization was completed and it was mustered into the U. S. service for a three-year term. Twelve companies were recruited but one was transferred to the 105th Infantry. It was next ordered to Fortress Monroe, where it embarked on board the Ocean Queen on an expedition to Port Royal.

After arriving on November 7, the unit captured Forts Walker and Fort Beauregard. Beaufort was next occupied and the regiment remained in this vicinity for several months, the men suffering very much from sickness. The 100th, participated in the operations against Charleston in June 1862, and suffered many casualties in the engagement of June 16, near Secessionville. Returning to Hilton Head and Beaufort in July, it was ordered to Virginia, later being sent to Fredericksburg and attached to the 9th Corps of the Army of Virginia. After various marches during the month of August, the regiment met the enemy on the Bull Run battlefield, where it saw hard service. After engaging all day and losing heavily, a final charge was ordered, from which only 198 out of 450 returned unhurt.

It was active at Chantilly and South Mountain, but was held in reserve at Antietam, owing to its crippled condition. It was engaged at Fredericksburg and after the battle performed important duty in covering the withdrawal of the troops, being selected as "The most reliable skirmish regiment in the brigade." In March 1863, it was transferred to the Department of the Ohio and sent to Lexington, Ky., from which place it was ordered in June to the support of Gen. Grant at Vicksburg.

It participated in the fighting at Jackson, Miss., after the fall of Vicksburg, and lost many men from sickness as well as from the enemy's fire. On its return north it was ordered to East Tennessee though many of the men were not fit for active service. It participated in an engagement at Blue Springs and in the hardships of the Siege of Knoxville, in spite of which almost the entire regiment reenlisted on January 1, 1864. At Annapolis, the rendezvous of the 9th Corps, the 100th reported in March and became a part of the 2nd Brigade, 1st Division, attached to the Army of the Potomac. The 9th Corps was closely engaged at the Wilderness, Spotsylvania, the North Anna River and Cold Harbor.

Moving to Petersburg, the 100th, was repeatedly in action, notably at the explosion of the mine, the raid on the Weldon Railroad, Poplar Spring Church the Hatcher's run movements, and in the final assault on Petersburg, April 2, 1865. The regiment was mustered out at Washington on July 24, 1865.

== Casualties ==
The regiment lost a total of 409 men during service. Sixteen officers and 208 enlisted men were killed or mortally wounded in combat. Two officers and 183 enlisted men died from disease-related causes.

== Commanders ==
- Colonel Daniel Leasure
- Colonel Norman J. Maxwell
- Lieutenant Colonel David A. Leckey - commanded at the Battle of Antietam
- Lieutenant Colonel Joseph E. Pentecost - commanded at the Battle of the Crater (while still at the rank of captain) after Cpt. Oliver was killed in action; mortally wounded in action at the Battle of Fort Stedman
- Major Thomas J. Hamilton - commanded at the Battle of the Crater where he was mortally wounded in action
- Major Norman J. Maxwell - commanded at the Battle of Fort Stedman after Ltc. Pentecost was mortally wounded in action
- Captain James E. Cornelius - commanded at the Second Battle of Bull Run after Col. Leasure was wounded in action
- Captain Walter Oliver - commanded at the Battle of the Crater after Maj. Hamilton was mortally wounded in action; killed in action there

== Notable members ==
- Private Joseph B. Chambers, Company F - Medal of Honor recipient for action at the Battle of Fort Stedman.

== See also ==
- List of Pennsylvania Civil War Units
- Pennsylvania in the Civil War
