= Joseph B. Chambers =

American Medal of Honor recipient (1833–1909)

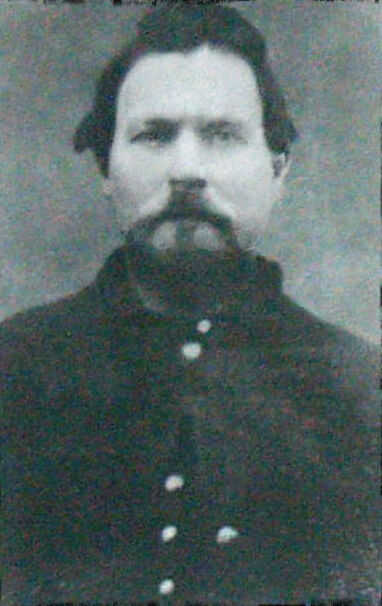
- Born: May 4, 1833; Beaver County, Pennsylvania
- Died: October 8, 1909 (aged 76)
- Burial place: Oak Park Cemetery, New Castle, Pennsylvania
- Military career
- Allegiance: United States of America
- Branch: United States Army; Union Army
- Rank: Private
- Unit: 100th Regiment Pennsylvania Volunteer Infantry - Company F
- Awards: Medal of Honor

Private Joseph B. Chambers (May 4, 1833 – October 8, 1909) was an American soldier who fought in the American Civil War. Chambers received the country's highest award for bravery during combat, the Medal of Honor, for his action at the Battle of Fort Stedman on 25 March 1865. He was honored with the award on 27 July 1871.

== Biography ==
Chambers was born in Beaver County, Pennsylvania on 4 May 1833. He enlisted in the 100th Pennsylvania Volunteer Infantry. Chambers died on 8 October 1909, and his remains are interred at the Oak Park Cemetery in Pennsylvania.

== Medal of Honor citation ==
Capture of colors of 1st Virginia Infantry (Confederate States of America).

== See also ==
- List of American Civil War Medal of Honor recipients: A–F
