= Cowansville, Pennsylvania =

Unincorporated community in Pennsylvania, US

- Unincorporated community
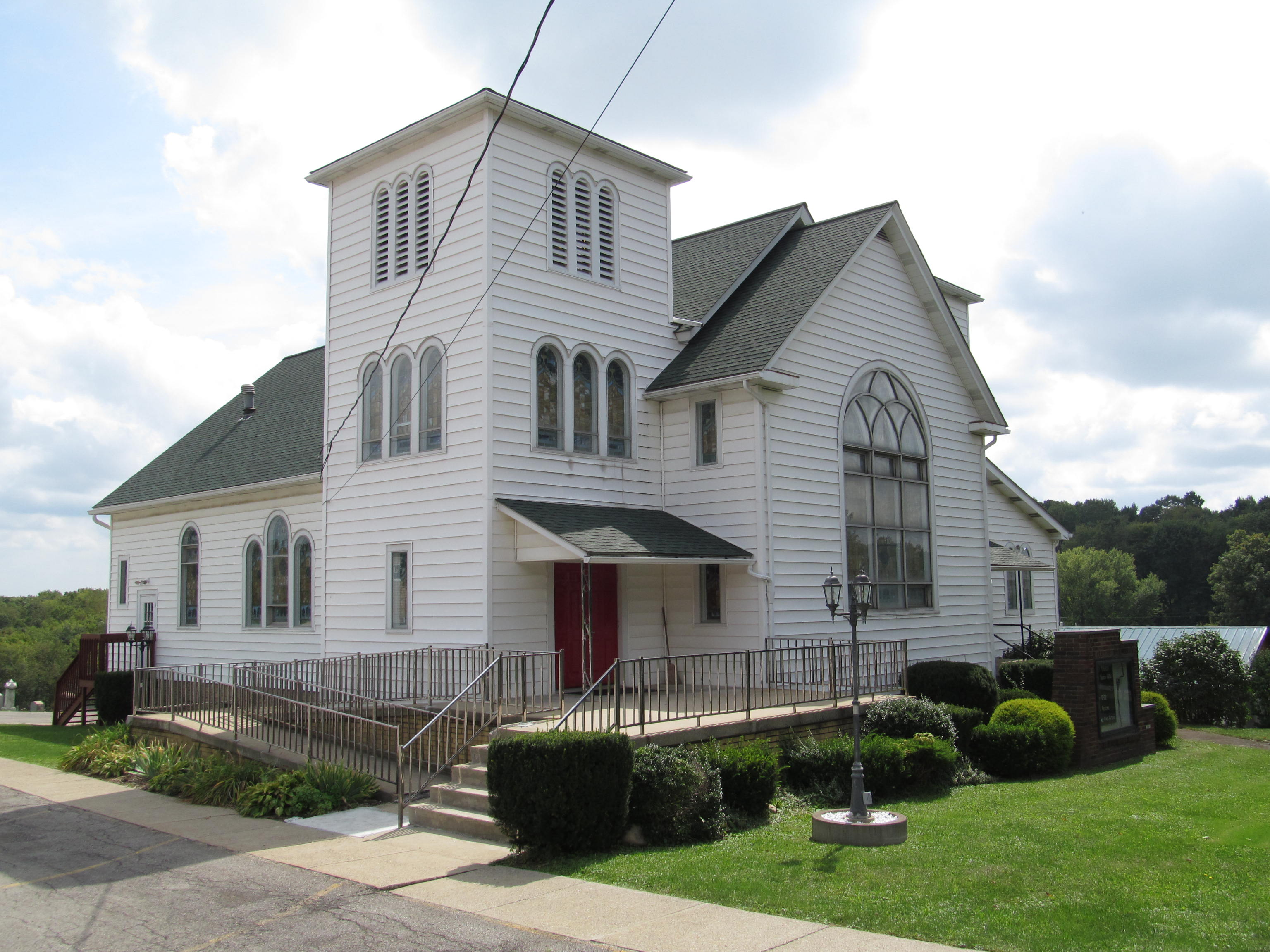
- Union First Presbyterian Church

- Location within Pennsylvania
- Coordinates: 40°53′16″N 79°35′18″W
- Country: United States
- State: Pennsylvania
- County: Armstrong
- Township: East Franklin
- Elevation: 1,362 ft (415 m)
- Time zone: UTC-5 (Eastern (EST))
  - Summer (DST): UTC-4 (EDT)
- ZIP code: 16218
- Area code: 724
- GNIS feature ID: 1213572

Cowansville is an unincorporated community in Armstrong County, Pennsylvania, United States. The community is located on Pennsylvania Route 268, at 6 miles (9.7 km) northwest of Kittanning. Cowansville has a post office, with ZIP code 16218, which opened on August 8, 1849.

== History ==
Middlesex, Cowansville P.O., appears in the 1876 Atlas of Armstrong County, Pennsylvania.
