= List of Washington & Jefferson College alumni =

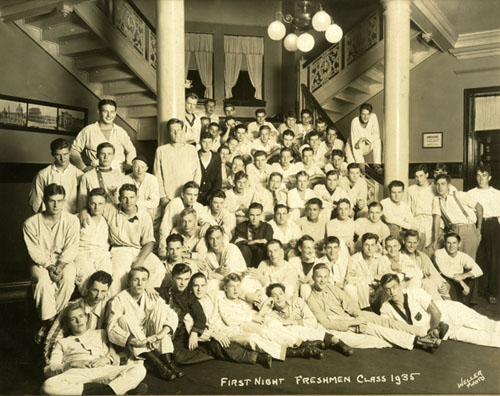
The 1935 freshmen class gathers on the first floor of Hays Hall, the freshman dormitory, to celebrate their first night at college.

Washington & Jefferson College is a private liberal arts college in Washington, Pennsylvania, which is located in the Pittsburgh metropolitan area. The college traces its origin to three log cabin colleges in Washington County, Pennsylvania established by three frontier clergymen in the 1780s: John McMillan, Thaddeus Dod, and Joseph Smith. These early schools eventually grew into two competing colleges, with Jefferson College in Canonsburg, Pennsylvania being chartered in 1802 and Washington College being chartered in 1806. These two schools merged in 1865 to form Washington & Jefferson College.

As of 2009, Washington & Jefferson College had about 12,000 living alumni. Before the union of the two colleges, Washington College graduated 872 men and Jefferson College graduated 1,936 men.

The alumni association recognizes as alumni all students "who have completed at least one college year as full-time students". These alumni include James G. Blaine, who served in Congress as speaker of the House, U.S. senator from Maine, two-time U.S. secretary of state and the Republican nominee for the 1884 presidential election. Other graduates have held high federal positions, including United States Secretary of the Treasury Benjamin Bristow and United States Attorney General Henry Stanbery, who successfully defended Andrew Johnson during his impeachment trial. As a U.S. congressman, Clarence Long was a key figure in directing funds to Operation Cyclone, the CIA's effort to arm the mujahideen in the Soviet–Afghan War. James A. Beaver served as governor of Pennsylvania and as acting president of the Pennsylvania State University; he is the namesake of Beaver Stadium, the largest sports stadium in the world. William Holmes McGuffey authored the McGuffey Readers, which are among the most popular and influential books in history. Thaddeus Dod's student, Jacob Lindley, was the first president of Ohio University. Astronaut and test pilot Joseph A. Walker became the first person to enter space twice. Other graduates have gone on to success in professional athletics, including Buddy Jeannette, a member of the Basketball Hall of Fame, and Pete Henry, a member of both the College and Pro Football Hall of Fame. Roger Goodell has served as the commissioner of the NFL since 2006. Baseball broadcaster Al Helfer was the radio voice of six World Series. Among graduates who entered the medical field, Jonathan Letterman is recognized as the "father of battlefield medicine." William Passavant is recognized as a saint within the Lutheran Church. James McGready, who studied with Joseph Smith and John McMillan, was a leading revivalist in the Second Great Awakening. Successful graduates in the business realm include Richard Clark, president and CEO of Merck, and John S. Reed, the former chairman of Citigroup and the New York Stock Exchange.

- A "?" indicates that the year of graduation is unknown.
- A "†" indicates final year attended.
- "Jefferson" indicates attendance at Jefferson College.
- "Washington" indicates attendance at Washington College.
- "Canonsburg" indicates attendance at Canonsburg Academy.
- "McMillan" indicates attendance at John McMillan's log college.
- "Dod" indicates attendance at Thaddeus Dod's log college.
- "Smith" indicates attendance at Joseph Smith's log college.

== Academia ==
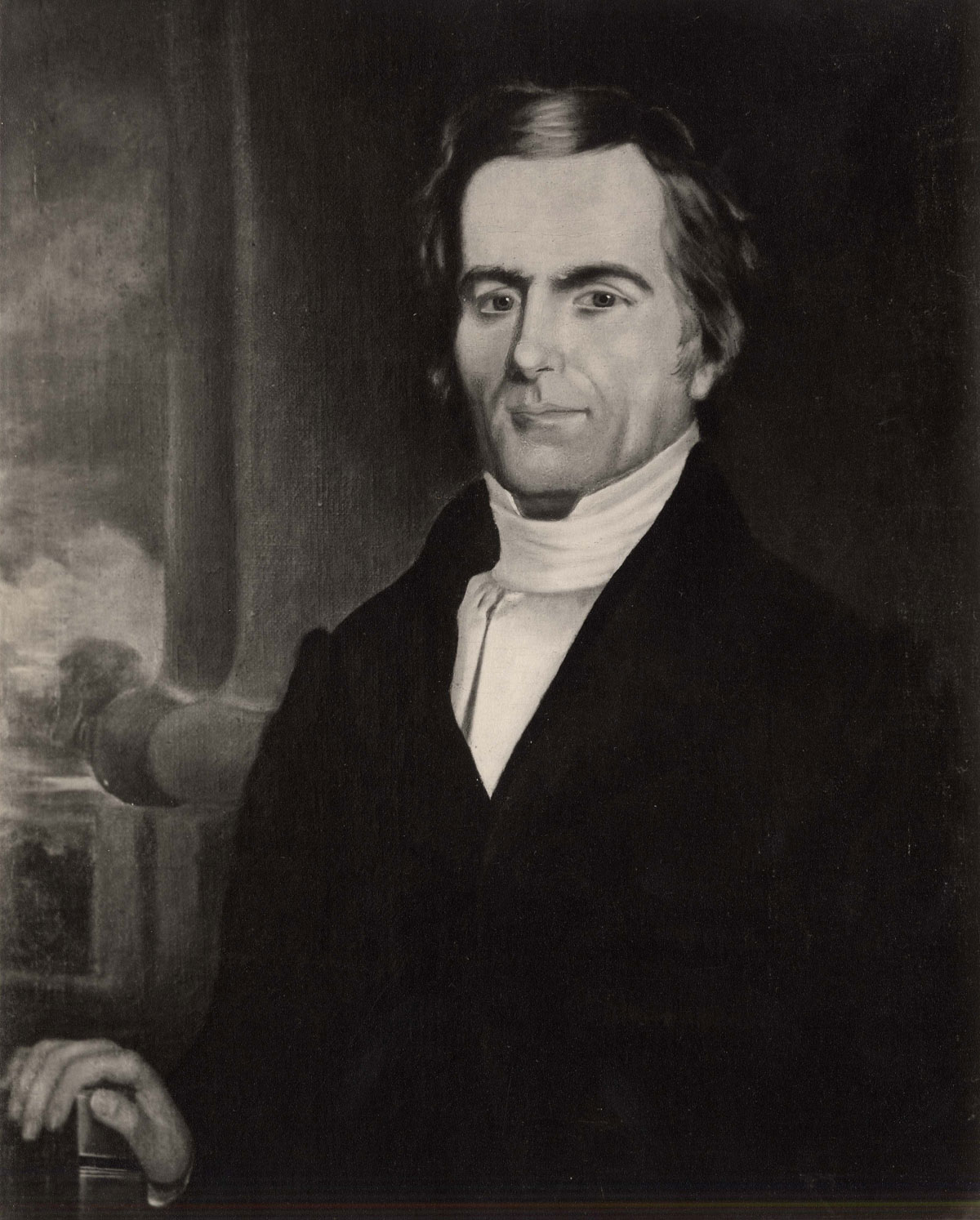
Andrew Wylie

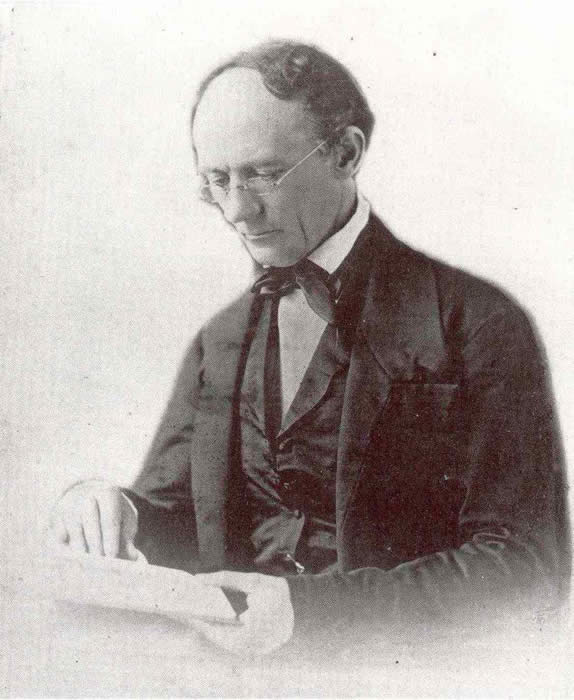
William Holmes McGuffey

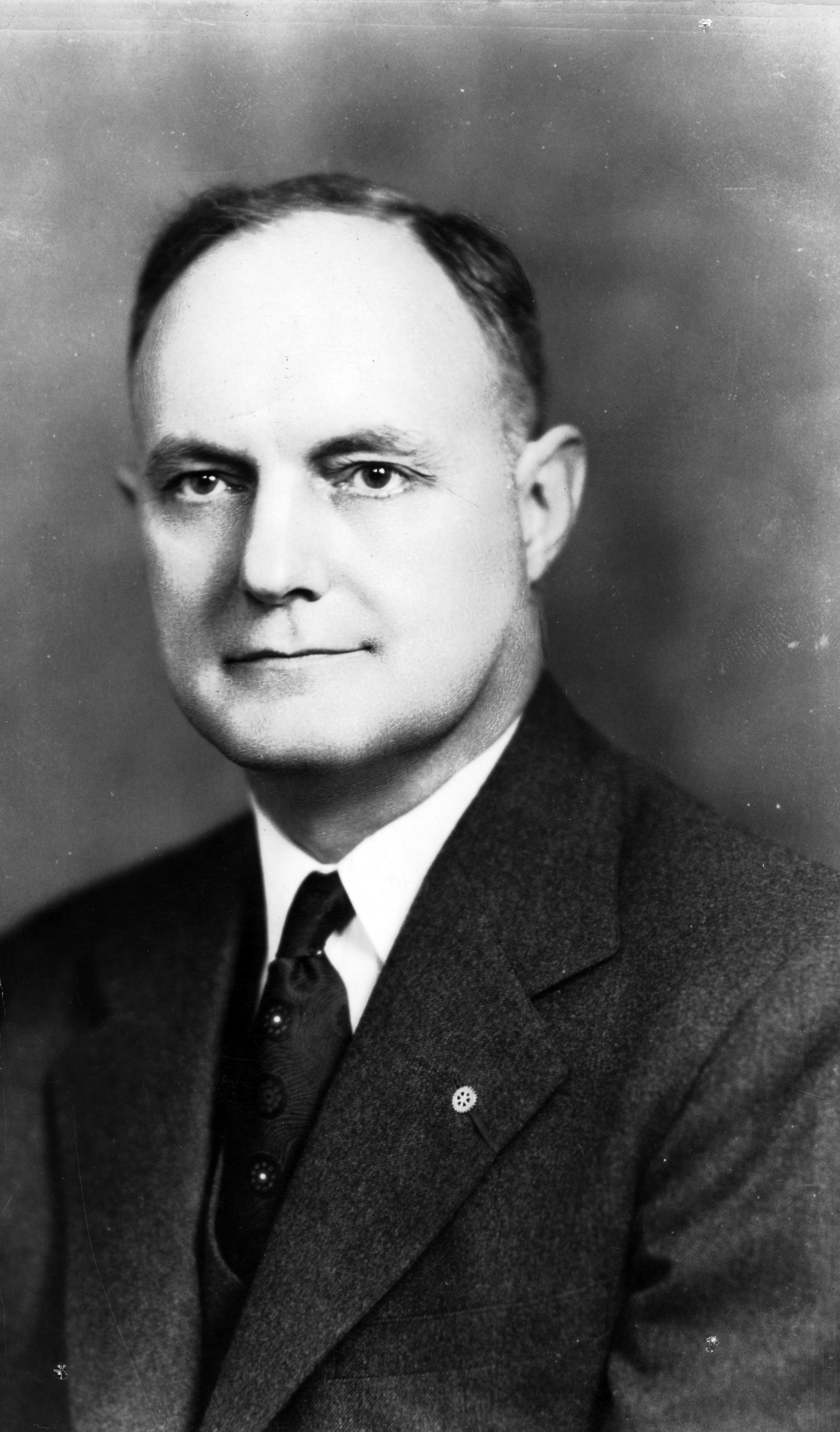
Dr. Blake Van Leer

| Alumni | Class year | Notability | References |
|---|---|---|---|
| William Caldwell Anderson | Jefferson 1824 | President of Miami University (1849–1854) | |
| George D. Archibald | Jefferson 1847 | President of Hanover College (1868–1870); president of Wilson Female Seminary (1873–1874) | |
| Thomas D. Baird | Jefferson 1842 | Principal of Baltimore City College (1857–1873); first professor of Mathematics at Westminster College, Missouri | |
| Simon Strousse Baker | 1892 | President of Washington & Jefferson College (1922–1931) | |
| James I. Brownson | Washington 1836 | Longtime trustee of Washington College and interim president (1852–1853); chair of the board of trustees at Washington & Jefferson College (1870); Presbyterian minister at First Presbyterian Church in Washington, Pennsylvania for over 50 years | |
| William Burnett | Jefferson 1832 | President of Franklin College in New Athens, Ohio (1839–1840); associate reformed minister; gave up ministry to head West | |
| Frederick E. Grine | 1974 | Professor of Paleoanthropology at Stony Brook University; expert in hominid taxonomy from the Pliocene era; led the research team that dated the Hofmeyr Skull | |
| George P. Hays | Jefferson 1857 | President of Washington & Jefferson College (1870–1881); Presbyterian minister | |
| Andrew Dousa Hepburn | Jefferson 1851 | President of Ohio University (1871–1873); president of Davidson College (1877–1885); professor of Metaphysics, Logic, and Rhetoric; Presbyterian minister | |
| Frederick A. Hetzel | 1952 | Editor of University of Pittsburgh Press (1963–1994); founded Drue Heinz Literature Prize and Pitt Poetry Series | |
| George Junkin | Jefferson 1813 | President of Lafayette College (1832–1841); president of Miami University (1841–1844); president Washington College, Virginia (1848–1861); author of many theological books; Presbyterian minister | |
| John McDowell Leavitt | Jefferson 1841 | President of Lehigh University (1875–1880) and St. John's College in Annapolis, Maryland (1880–1889); founder and editor of International Review; lawyer, poet, author, and Protestant Episcopal minister | |
| Francis Julius LeMoyne | Washington 1815 | Nationally known abolitionist, philanthropist, founder of Washington Female Seminary, and benefactor of LeMoyne–Owen College, a historically Black college in Memphis, Tennessee | |
| Jacob Lindley | Dod 1794 | First president of Ohio University (1809–1822) | |
| John Livingston Lowes | 1888 | Scholar of English literature; wrote The Road to Xanadu: A Study in the Ways of the Imagination, in 1927, the definitive study of Samuel Taylor Coleridge; dean and professor at Washington University in St. Louis (1909–1918) and Harvard University (1918–1939) | |
| Samuel McCormick | 1880 | Chancellor of University of Pittsburgh (1904–1921); moved the university to its current location in Oakland and fortified its tradition of teacher liberal arts | |
| William Holmes McGuffey | Washington 1826 | Author of McGuffey Readers; president of Cincinnati College (1836–1839); president of Ohio University (1839–1843); professor of Languages and Philosophy | |
| William McMillan | Jefferson 1802 | President of Jefferson College (1817–1822); first president of Franklin College in New Athens, Ohio (1823–1832) | |
| James D. Moffat | 1869 | President of Washington & Jefferson College (1881–1915) | |
| John Monteith | Jefferson 1813 | President of University of Michigan (1817–1821) | |
| Frederick Augustus Muhlenberg | Jefferson 1836 | First president of Muhlenberg College (1867–1877); president of Thiel College (1891–1901) | |
| Robert Munce | 1918 | President of Suffolk University (1954–1960) | |
| Edwin Henry Nevin | Jefferson 1833 | President of Franklin College in New Athens, Ohio (1840–1845); Presbyterian minister; published several theological books | |
| Boyd Crumrine Patterson | 1923 | President of Washington & Jefferson College (1950–1970); professor of Mathematics at Hamilton College and Washington & Jefferson College | |
| David Hunter Riddle | Jefferson 1823 | President of Jefferson College (1862–1866); professor of Greek; Presbyterian minister | |
| Alfred Ryors | Jefferson 1835 | President of Ohio University (1848–1852); president of Indiana University (1852–1853); professor of Mathematics at Indiana University, Ohio University, and Centre College | |
| John Work Scott | Jefferson 1827 | President of Washington College (1853–1865), retired to facilitate union with Jefferson College; vice president and professor of West Virginia University (1867–1877); Presbyterian minister | |
| William Edward Sell | 1945 | Legal academic and professor; dean of University of Pittsburgh School of Law (1966–1977); considered the "father" of Pennsylvania business corporation law; taught at University of Pittsburgh School of Law for over 50 years | |
| Joseph Smith | Jefferson 1815 | President of Franklin College in New Athens, Ohio (1837–1838); Presbyterian minister; wrote two early histories of the Presbytery of Redstone and Jefferson College; grandson of college founder Joseph Smith | |
| Joseph Stockton | Canonsburg 1798 | Principal of Pittsburgh Academy (1810–1819); founder of Meadville Academy | |
| Blake R. Van Leer | Jefferson 1922 | President of Georgia Tech (1944); former dean at University of Florida and North Carolina State University | |
| John Watson | Canonsburg ? | President of Jefferson College (1802); studied under college founder John McMillan; professor of Moral Philosophy | |
| Andrew Wylie | Jefferson 1810 | President of Jefferson College (1812–1816); president of Washington College (1817–1829); first president of Indiana University (1829–1851); Protestant Episcopal minister | |

== Military and aerospace ==
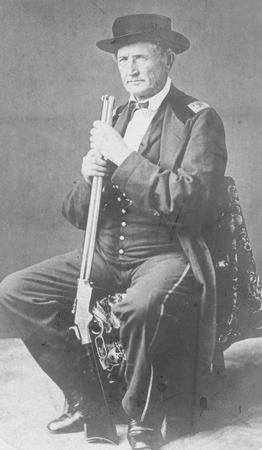
Daniel McCook

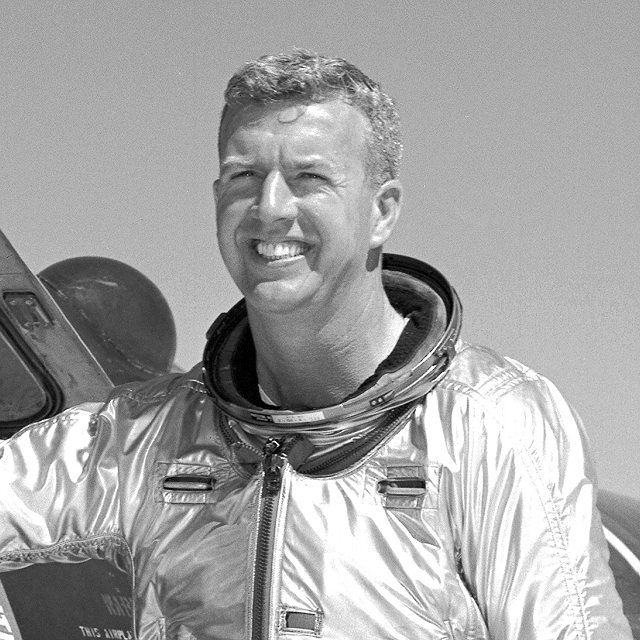
Joseph A. Walker

| Alumni | Class year | Notability | References |
|---|---|---|---|
| James Patton Anderson | Jefferson 1842† | Confederate brigadier general during the American Civil War, commanding the Army of Tennessee; delegate to the Provisional Confederate Congress from Florida; U.S. congressman from Washington Territory (1855–1857) | |
| John Byers Anderson | Washington 1836 | Union Army officer during the American Civil War, serving as military supervisor of railroads in the Department of the Ohio, Department of the Cumberland, and Department of the Tennessee during the American Civil War | |
| Absalom Baird | Washington 1841 | Medal of Honor recipient; inspector general of the U.S. Army (1885–1888); Union brevet major general during the American Civil War | |
| Henry H. Bingham | Jefferson 1862 | Medal of Honor recipient; Union brigadier general during the American Civil War; U.S. congressman from Pennsylvania (1879–1912) | |
| Richard Coulter | Jefferson 1845 | Brevet major general in the Union Army during the American Civil War | |
| Richard C. Drum | Jefferson 1845† | Adjutant general of the U.S. Army (1880–1889) | |
| Maxwell Hunter | 1942 | Rocket engineer and proponent of single-stage rocket ships and laser battle stations in space; worked at Lockheed Missiles and Space Company; chief engineer of space systems at Douglas Aircraft Company; developed expendable fuel tanks for space shuttle and early stages of the Hubble Space Telescope; worked on the staff of National Aeronautics and Space Council; wrote textbook Thrust Into Space | |
| James S. Jackson | Jefferson 1844 | U.S. congressman from Kentucky (1861), resigned to enter the Union Army during the American Civil War, rising to become brigadier general; killed during Battle of Perryville | |
| Albert G. Jenkins | Jefferson 1848 | Confederate brigadier general during the American Civil War; U.S. congressman from Virginia (1857–1861); member of the First Confederate Congress (1861–1862) | |
| E. Henry Knoche | 1978 | Deputy director of Central Intelligence and acting director of Central Intelligence (1976) | |
| John S. Mason | Washington ? | Brigadier general in the Union Army during the American Civil War | |
| Walter B. Massenberg | 1970 | Vice admiral in the United States Navy and director of the Naval Air Systems Command; majored in physics and worked as equipment manager for the Washington & Jefferson basketball team | |
| David McConaughy | Washington 1840 | Led the effort to create a national cemetery at the site of the Battle of Gettysburg; founded Evergreen Cemetery (Gettysburg, Pennsylvania); attorney | |
| Daniel McCook | Jefferson ? | Patriarch of the "Tribe of Dan" of the Fighting McCooks; officer in the Union Army during the American Civil War; his home, the Daniel McCook House, is on the National Register of Historic Places | |
| Henry Christopher McCook | Jefferson 1859 | Presbyterian minister, active in developing Sunday Schools; Union chaplain during the American Civil War and member of the celebrated Fighting McCooks; entomologist, publishing articles on ants and spiders; author of fiction, including The Latimers, as well as several religious discourses and hymns; designed the Flag of Philadelphia | |
| John James McCook | Jefferson 1826† | Patriarch of the "Tribe of John" of the Fighting McCooks; surgeon in the Union Army during the American Civil War | |
| Latimer A. McCook | Jefferson ? | Major in the 31st Illinois Volunteer Infantry Regiment during the American Civil War; member of the Fighting McCooks | |
| Philo McGiffen | 1875† | American naval officer who went to China and served in the Imperial Chinese Navy; he commanded ships during the First Sino-Japanese War and Sino-French War; best known for his heroism during the Battle of the Yalu River | |
| Harry E. Miller Jr. | 1980 | Major general who commanded the 42nd Infantry Division | |
| George W. Morgan | Washington 1836† | Fought in the Texian Army during the Texas Revolution; brevet brigadier general during the American Civil War; served as consul to Marseille and U.S. ambassador to Portugal; U.S. congressman from Ohio (1867–1868, 1869–1873) | |
| Joshua T. Owen | Jefferson 1845 | Brigadier general during the American Civil War | |
| Alfred L. Pearson | Jefferson ? | Union brevet major general during the American Civil War; received the Medal of Honor for his actions during the Battle of Lewis's Farm | |
| Dale Stoffel | 1984 | Naval intelligence officer and businessman; worked as an arms dealer on behalf of United States Department of Defense following the Cold War and during the Iraq War; majored in mathematics and physics | |
| Jacob B. Sweitzer | Jefferson 1843 | Brevet brigadier general during the American Civil War; lawyer and United States Attorney (1849–1869) | |
| Daniel Van Voorhis | 1901† | United States Army lieutenant general; Commander of the Caribbean Defense Command and V Corps; left Washington & Jefferson College to enlist in the Spanish–American War | |
| Joseph A. Walker | 1942 | Astronaut and test pilot; piloted the X-15 Spaceplane during Flight 90 and Flight 91 beyond 100 kilometers, making him the first person to enter space twice; first to pilot Lunar Landing Research Vehicle for the Apollo program | |
| Samuel Baldwin Marks Young | Jefferson ? | First chief of staff of the United States Army (1903–1904); left Jefferson College to work on the Pennsylvania Railroad; superintendent of Yellowstone National Park (1907–1908) | |

== Law and government ==
=== Federal executives ===
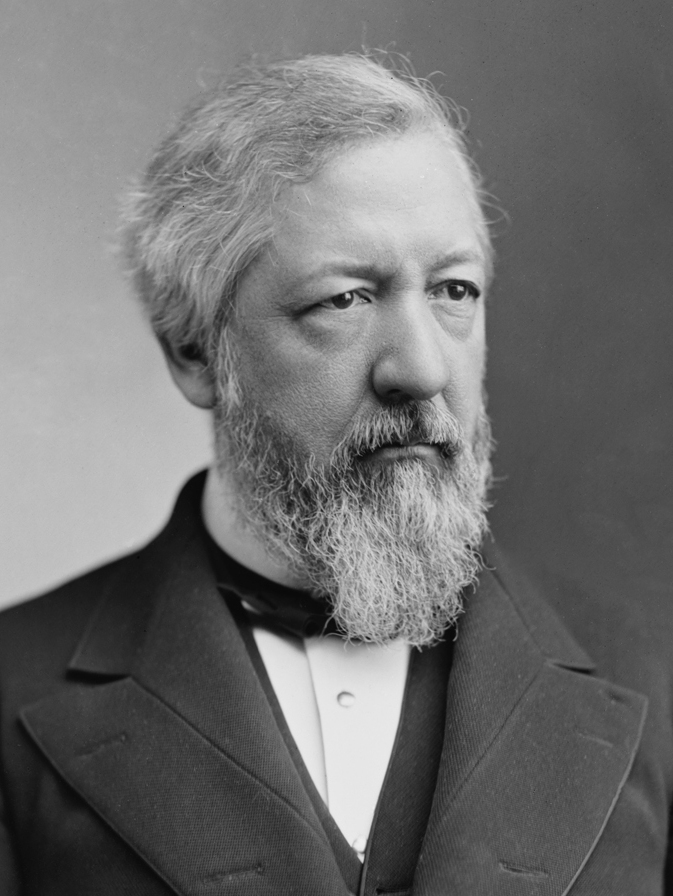
James Blaine

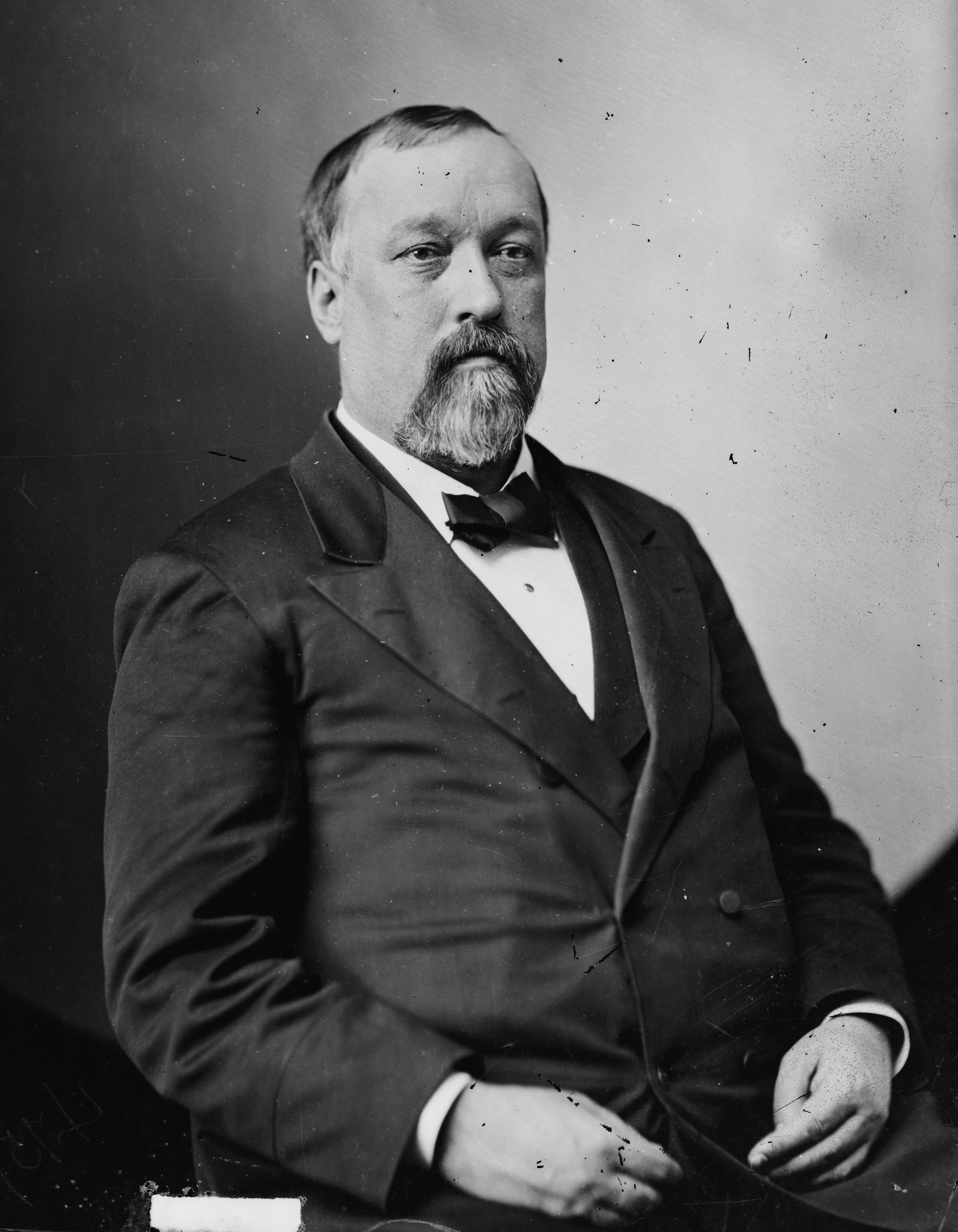
Benjamin Helm Bristow

| Alumni | Class year | Notability | References |
|---|---|---|---|
| William Livingston Alden | Jefferson 1858 | United States general consul to Rome (1885–1907); author and editor of The New York Times; credited with bringing the sport of canoeing to the United States; son of Joseph Alden, president of Jefferson College | |
| James G. Blaine | Washington 1847 | Republican nominee for president of the U.S. in 1884, losing to Grover Cleveland by 1,047 votes; leader of the Half-Breed faction of the postbellum Republican party; U.S. secretary of state (1881, 1889–1892); U.S. senator from Maine (1876–1881); speaker of the United States House of Representatives (1869–1873, 1873–1875); U.S. congressman from Maine (1863–1876) | |
| Benjamin Bristow | Jefferson 1851 | Solicitor general of the United States (1870–1872); U.S. secretary of the treasury (1874–1876) | |
| Maxwell M. Hamilton | 1918 | U.S. ambassador to Finland (1945–1947); diplomatic representative to Finland during 1944 amid World War II and the Continuation War | |
| George A. Jenks | Jefferson 1858 | United States solicitor general (1886–1889); U.S. congressman from Pennsylvania (1875–1877), where he was a house manager for the impeachment proceedings of United States Secretary of War William Belknap | |
| Noah C. McFarland | Washington 1844† | Commissioner of the United States General Land Office (1881–1885); Ohio state senator (1866–1867); Kansas state senator | |
| Thomas M. T. McKennan | Washington 1810 | U.S. secretary of the interior (1850); U.S. congressman from Pennsylvania (1831–1839, 1842–1843) | |
| A. Loudon Snowden | Jefferson 1856 | United States minister to Greece, Romania and Serbia (1889-1892); Spain (1892-1893) | |
| Henry Stanbery | Washington 1819 | United States attorney general (1866–1868), resigning to defend Andrew Johnson during his impeachment; attorney general of Ohio (1846–1851) | |

=== U.S. senators ===
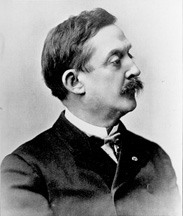
Matthew Quay

| Alumni | Class year | Notability | References |
|---|---|---|---|
| James Cooper | Washington 1832 | U.S. senator from Pennsylvania (1849–1855); U.S. congressman from Pennsylvania (1839–1843); Pennsylvania state representative (1843–1844, 1846, 1848), serving as speaker of the House; Pennsylvania attorney general (1848); brigadier general during the American Civil War | |
| John J. Patterson | Jefferson 1848 | U.S. senator from South Carolina (1873–1879) | |
| Matthew Quay | Jefferson 1850 | U.S. senator from Pennsylvania (1887–1899, 1901–1904); Pennsylvanian political boss; chairman of the Republican National Committee; campaign manager for Benjamin Harrison during the 1888 presidential election; soldier during the American Civil War, awarded the Medal of Honor for his actions during the Battle of Fredericksburg | |
| Ephraim King Wilson II | Jefferson 1840 | U.S. senator from Maryland (1885–1891); U.S. congressman from Maryland (1873–1875) | |

=== Members of Congress ===
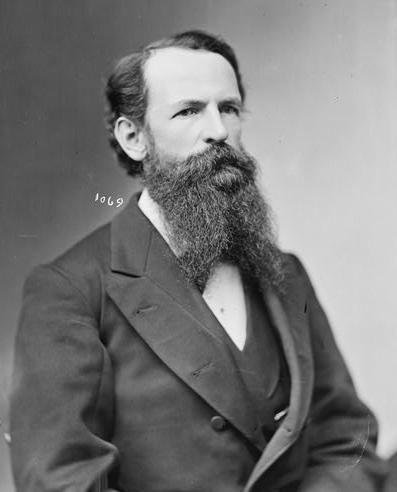
Rush Clark

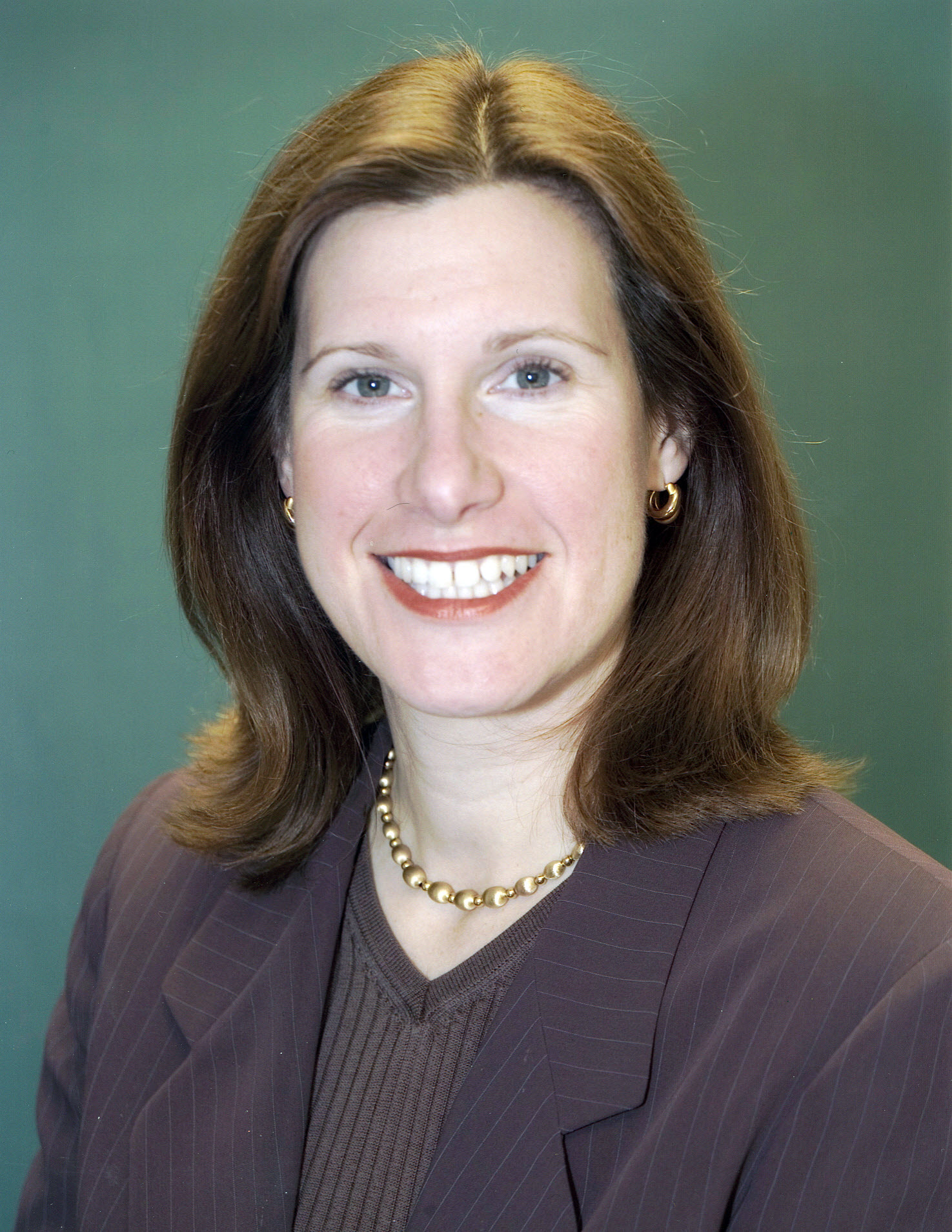
Melissa Hart

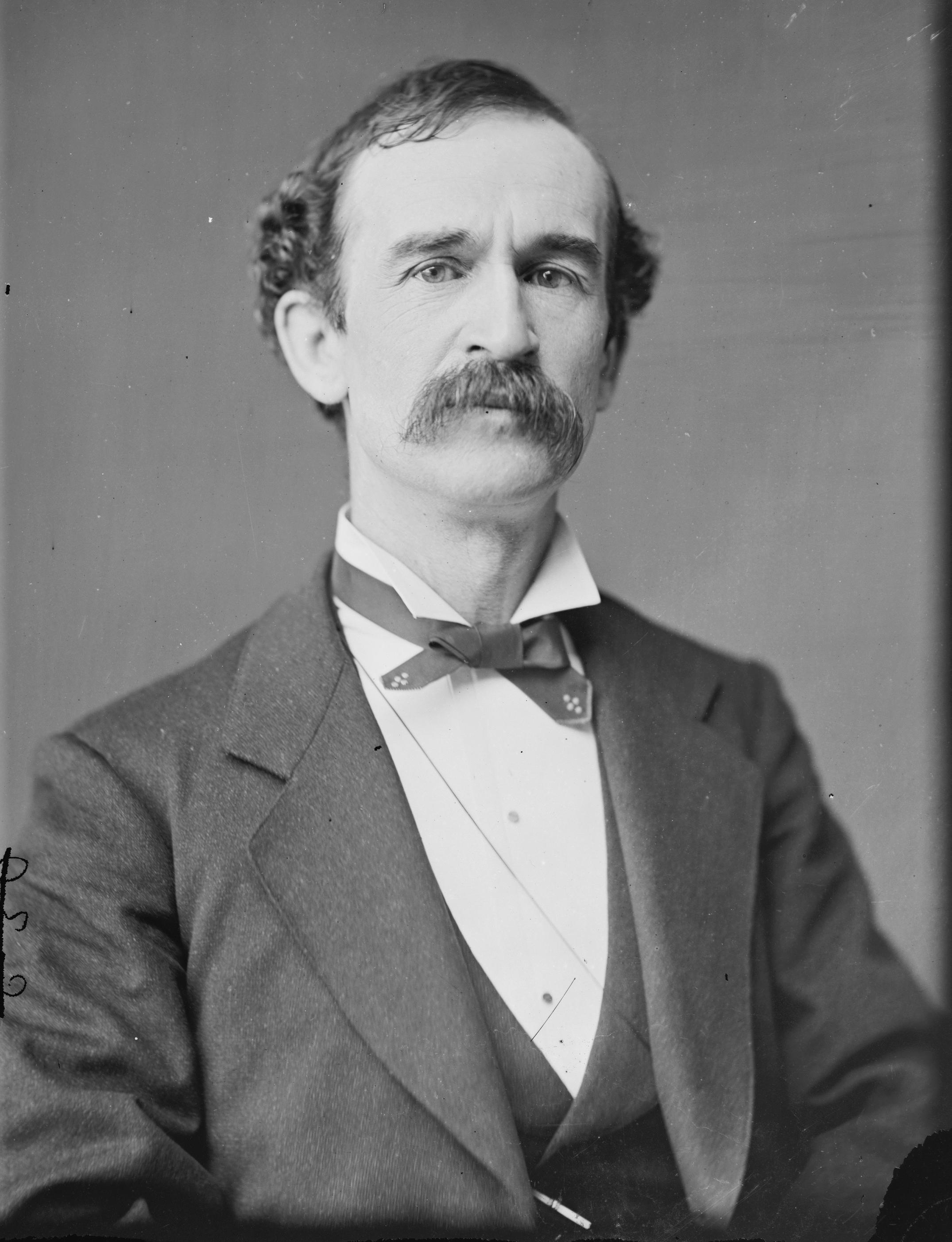
John Herron Hopkins

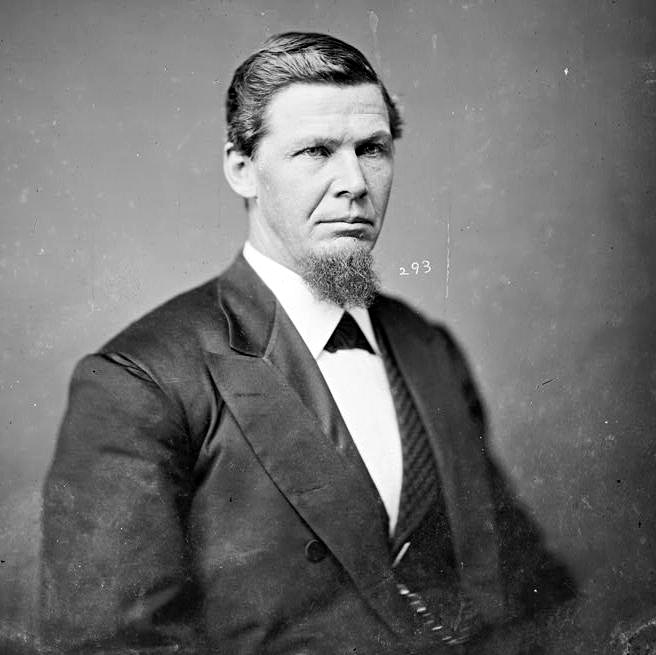
S. Addison Oliver

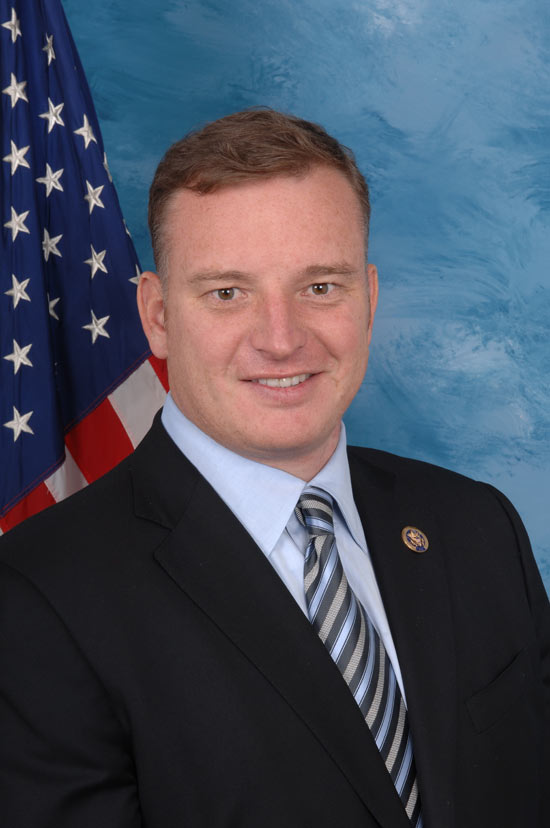
Tom Rooney

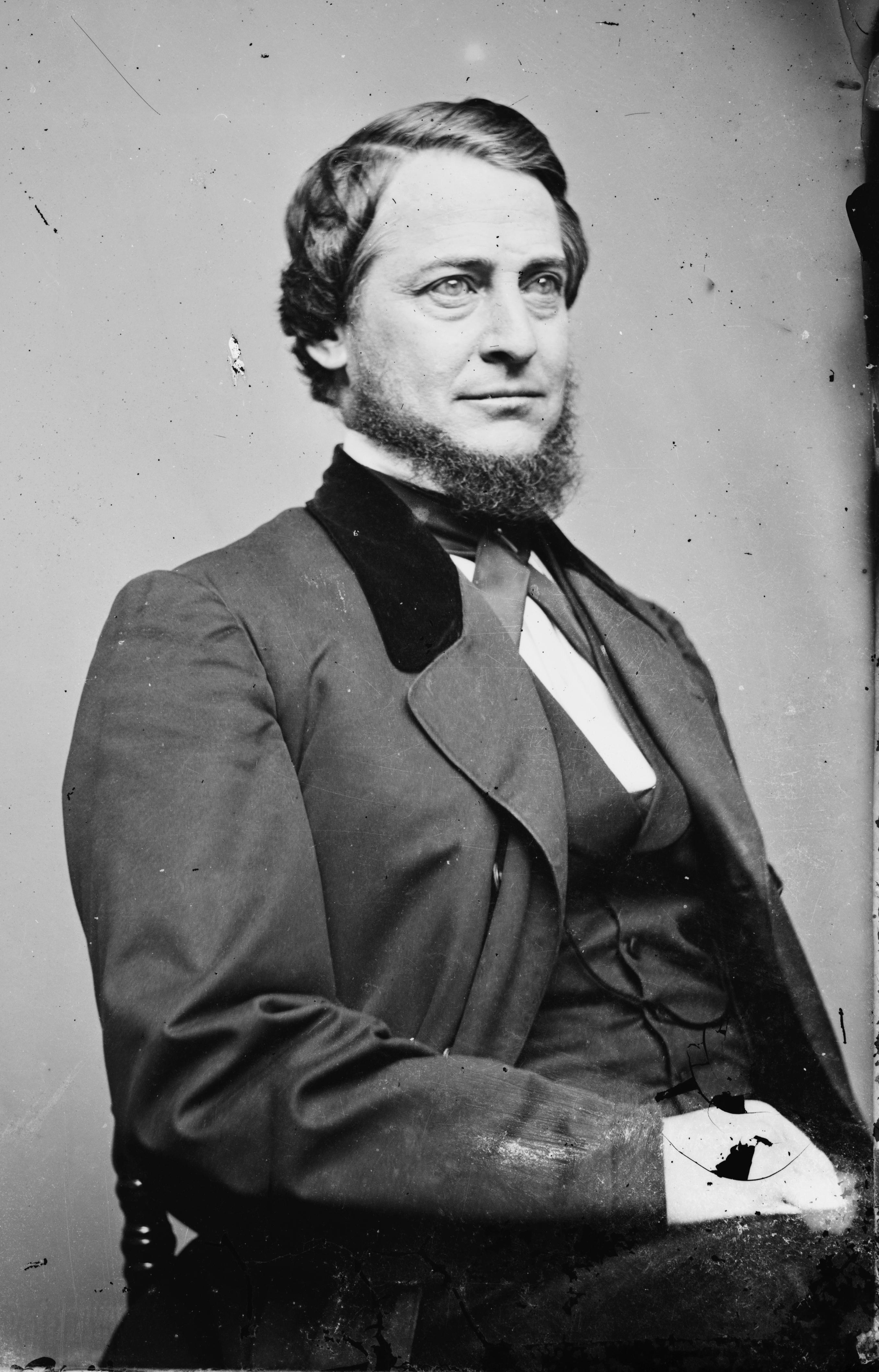
Clement Vallandigham

| Alumni | Class year | Notability | References |
|---|---|---|---|
| Ernest F. Acheson | 1875 | U.S. congressman from Pennsylvania (1895–1909); owner/editor of the Washington Weekly Observer | |
| Carl G. Bachmann | 1911† | U.S. congressman from West Virginia (1925–1933), serving as minority whip (1931–1933) | |
| David Barclay | Washington 1843† | U.S. congressman from Pennsylvania (1855–1857) | |
| Samuel Steel Blair | Jefferson 1838 | U.S. congressman from Pennsylvania (1859–1863) | |
| Rush Clark | Jefferson 1853 | U.S. congressman from Iowa (1877–1879); member of the Iowa House of Representatives, serving as speaker of the House 1863–1864 | |
| Sherrard Clemens | Washington 1841 | U.S. congressman from Virginia (1852–1853, 1857–1861) | |
| Samuel Alfred Craig | Jefferson 1862† | U.S. congressman from Pennsylvania (1889–1891) | |
| John D. Cummins | Jefferson 1834 | U.S. congressman from Ohio (1845–1849) | |
| John Littleton Dawson | Washington 1833 | U.S. congressman from Pennsylvania (1851–1855, 1863–1867) | |
| Philip Doddridge | Canonsburg | U.S. congressman from Virginia (now West Virginia) | |
| Augustus Drum | Jefferson 1832† | U.S. congressman Pennsylvania (1853–1855) | |
| Daniel Duncan | Jefferson 1825† | U.S. congressman from Ohio (1847–1849) | |
| John Hoge Ewing | Washington 1814 | U.S. congressman from Pennsylvania (1845–1847) | |
| John Rankin Franklin | Jefferson 1836 | U.S. congressman from Maryland (1853–1855); member of Maryland House of Delegates (1840–1843), serving as speaker of the House for the 1849 session | |
| Alfred Gilmore | Washington 1833 | U.S. congressman from Pennsylvania (1849–1853) | |
| Louis E. Graham | 1901 | U.S. congressman from Pennsylvania (1939–1955) | |
| Moses Hampton | Washington 1827 | U.S. congressman from Pennsylvania (1847–1851); founded Buchanan, Ingersoll & Rooney law firm | |
| Stephen Ross Harris | Washington 1842† | U.S. congressman from Ohio (1895–1897) | |
| Melissa Hart | 1984 | U.S. congresswoman from Pennsylvania (2001–2007); Pennsylvania state senator (1991–2001) | |
| Henry William Hoffman | Jefferson 1846 | U.S. congressman from Maryland (1855–1857); sergeant at arms of the United States House of Representatives (1860–1861) | |
| Joseph P. Hoge | Jefferson 1829 | U.S. congressman from Illinois (1843–1847) | |
| James Herron Hopkins | Washington 1850 | U.S. congressman from Pennsylvania (1875–1877, 1883–1885) | |
| Joseph Henry Kuhns | Washington 1830 | U.S. congressman from Pennsylvania (1851–1853) | |
| John Christian Kunkel | Jefferson 1839 | U.S. congressman from Pennsylvania (1855–1859) | |
| Samuel Lahm | Washington ? | U.S. congressman from Ohio (1847–1849) | |
| George Van Eman Lawrence | Washington 1838 | U.S. congressman from Pennsylvania (1865–1869, 1883–1885) | |
| William Lawrence | Jefferson 1835 | U.S. congressman from Ohio (1857–1859) | |
| John V. Le Moyne | Washington 1847 | U.S. congressman from Pennsylvania (1876–1877) | |
| James Russell Leech | 1911 | U.S. congressman from Pennsylvania (1927–1932) | |
| Isaac Leet | Washington 1822 | U.S. congressman from Pennsylvania (1839–1841) | |
| Isaac Leffler | Jefferson ? | U.S. congressman from Virginia (1827–1829) | |
| Shepherd Leffler | Jefferson 1833 | U.S. congressman from Iowa (1846–1851) | |
| Clarence Long | 1932 | U.S. congressman from Maryland (1963–1985) | |
| James Thompson Maffett | Jefferson 1859 | U.S. congressman from Pennsylvania (1887–1889) | |
| Addison S. McClure | Jefferson 1861 | U.S. congressman from Ohio (1881–1883, 1895–1897) | |
| Moses A. McCoid | Washington ? | U.S. congressman from Iowa (1879–1885) | |
| John McCulloch | Jefferson 1825 | U.S. congressman from Pennsylvania (1853–1855) | |
| Welty McCullogh | 1870 | U.S. congressman from Pennsylvania (1887–1889) | |
| Ebenezer McJunkin | Jefferson 1841 | U.S. congressman from Pennsylvania (1871–1875) | |
| Benjamin Franklin Meyers | Jefferson 1854 | U.S. congressman from Pennsylvania (1871–1873); postmaster of Harrisburg, Pennsylvania; newspaper publisher of the Harrisburg Daily Patriot, the Bedford Gazette, and the Daily Star Independent | |
| John K. Miller | Jefferson 1838 | U.S. congressman from Ohio (1847–1851) | |
| John Gallagher Montgomery | Washington 1824 | U.S. congressman from Pennsylvania (1857) | |
| William Montgomery | Washington 1839 | U.S. congressman from Pennsylvania (1857–1861) | |
| Robert Moore | Washington ? | U.S. congressman from Pennsylvania (1817–1821) | |
| William Sutton Moore | Washington 1847 | U.S. congressman from Pennsylvania (1873–1875) | |
| John Murtha | 1952† | U.S. congressman from Pennsylvania (1974–2010), chair of Appropriations Subcommittee on Defense; first Vietnam veteran elected to Congress | |
| Andrew Jackson Ogle | Jefferson 1840 | U.S. congressman from Pennsylvania (1849–1851) | |
| Charles Ogle | Washington 1817 | U.S. congressman from Pennsylvania (1837–1841) | |
| S. Addison Oliver | Washington 1851 | U.S. congressman from Iowa (1875–1879) | |
| William Henry Mills Pusey | Washington 1847 | U.S. congressman from Iowa (1883–1885) | |
| Christopher Rankin | Jefferson 1809 | U.S. congressman from Mississippi (1819–1826) | |
| Charles Manning Reed | Washington 1818 | U.S. congressman from Pennsylvania (1843–1845); brigadier general in state militia | |
| Robert Rentoul Reed | Washington 1824 | U.S. congressman from Pennsylvania (1849–1851) | |
| David Ritchie | Jefferson 1829 | U.S. congressman from Pennsylvania (1853–1859) | |
| Edward Everett Robbins | 1881 | U.S. congressman from Pennsylvania (1897–1899, 1917–1919) | |
| James Wallace Robinson | Jefferson 1848 | U.S. congressman from Ohio (1873–1875) | |
| James S. Rollins | Jefferson 1829† | U.S. congressman from Missouri (1861–1863, 1863–1865), where he helped pass the Thirteenth Amendment to the United States Constitution; considered the "father" of the University of Missouri | |
| Tom Rooney | 1993 | U.S. congressman from Florida (2009–present) | |
| John Marshall Rose | 1880 | U.S. congressman from Pennsylvania (1917–1923) | |
| Samuel Lyon Russell | Washington 1834 | U.S. congressman from Pennsylvania (1853–1855) | |
| Charles Reginald Schirm | 1890† | U.S. congressman from Maryland (1901–1903) | |
| James S. Smart | Jefferson 1863 | U.S. congressman from New York (1873–1875) | |
| Peter Moore Speer | 1887 | U.S. congressman from Pennsylvania (1911–1913); general counsel of Standard Oil | |
| Andrew Stewart | Washington ? | U.S. congressman from Pennsylvania (1821–1829, 1831–1835, 1843–1849); U.S. attorney for the Western District of Pennsylvania (1818–1820); runner-up for vice presidential nomination at 1848 Whig National Convention | |
| William Stewart | Jefferson ? | U.S. congressman from Pennsylvania (1857–1861) | |
| T. R. Stockdale | Jefferson 1856 | U.S. congressman from Mississippi (1887–1895) | |
| Samuel Stokely | Washington 1813 | U.S. congressman from Ohio (1841–1843) | |
| Alexander Wilson Taylor | Jefferson 1844 | U.S. congressman from Pennsylvania (1873–1875) | |
| George W. Thompson | Jefferson 1824 | U.S. congressman from Virginia (1851–1852) | |
| Clement Vallandigham | Jefferson 1840† | U.S. congressman from Ohio (1858–1863) | |
| Jonathan H. Wallace | Washington 1844 | U.S. congressman from Ohio (1884–1885) | |
| Eugene McLanahan Wilson | Jefferson 1852 | U.S. congressman from Minnesota (1869–1871) | |

=== Federal judges ===
| Alumni | Class year | Notability | References |
|---|---|---|---|
| Marcus W. Acheson | Washington 1845 | Judge of the United States Court of Appeals for the Third Circuit (1891–1906); judge of the United States District Court for the Western District of Pennsylvania (1880–1891) | |
| Robert Murray Gibson | 1889 | Judge of the United States District Court for the Western District of Pennsylvania (1922–1949), serving as chief judge 1948–1949 | |
| Samuel Dexter Lecompte | Jefferson 1834 | Chief justice of the Supreme Court of the Kansas Territory (1854–1859) | |
| Barron Patterson McCune | 1935 | Judge of the United States District Court for the Western District of Pennsylvania (1970–2008) | |
| John Wilson McIlvaine | 1928 | Judge of the United States District Court for the Western District of Pennsylvania (1955–1963) | |
| William McKennan | Washington 1833 | Judge of the U. S. Circuit Court for the Third Circuit (1869–1891) | |
| Andrew G. Miller | Washington 1819 | Justice of the Wisconsin Territory Supreme Court (1838–1848); judge of the United States District Court for the District of Wisconsin and Eastern District of Wisconsin (1848–1873); Pennsylvania attorney general | |
| Kevin A. Ohlson | 1982 | Chief judge of the United States Court of Appeals for the Armed Forces (2013–present) | |
| Ethelbert Patterson Oliphant | Jefferson 1825 | Judge of the Supreme Court of Washington Territory (1861–1865) | |
| Albert C. Thompson | Jefferson 1854† | Judge of the United States District Court for the Southern District of Ohio (1898–1910); U.S. congressman from Ohio (1885–1891) | |
| W. H. Seward Thomson | 1878 | Judge of the United States District Court for the Western District of Pennsylvania (1914–1932) | |
| John Titus | Washington ? | Chief justice of Arizona Territorial Supreme Court (1870–1874); chief justice of Utah Territorial Supreme Court (1863–1868); associate justice of the Arizona Territorial Supreme Court (1869–1870) | |
| James Scott Young | 1869 | Judge of the United States District Court for the Western District of Pennsylvania (1908–1914); U.S. attorney for the Western District of Pennsylvania (1902–1905) | |

=== State judges ===
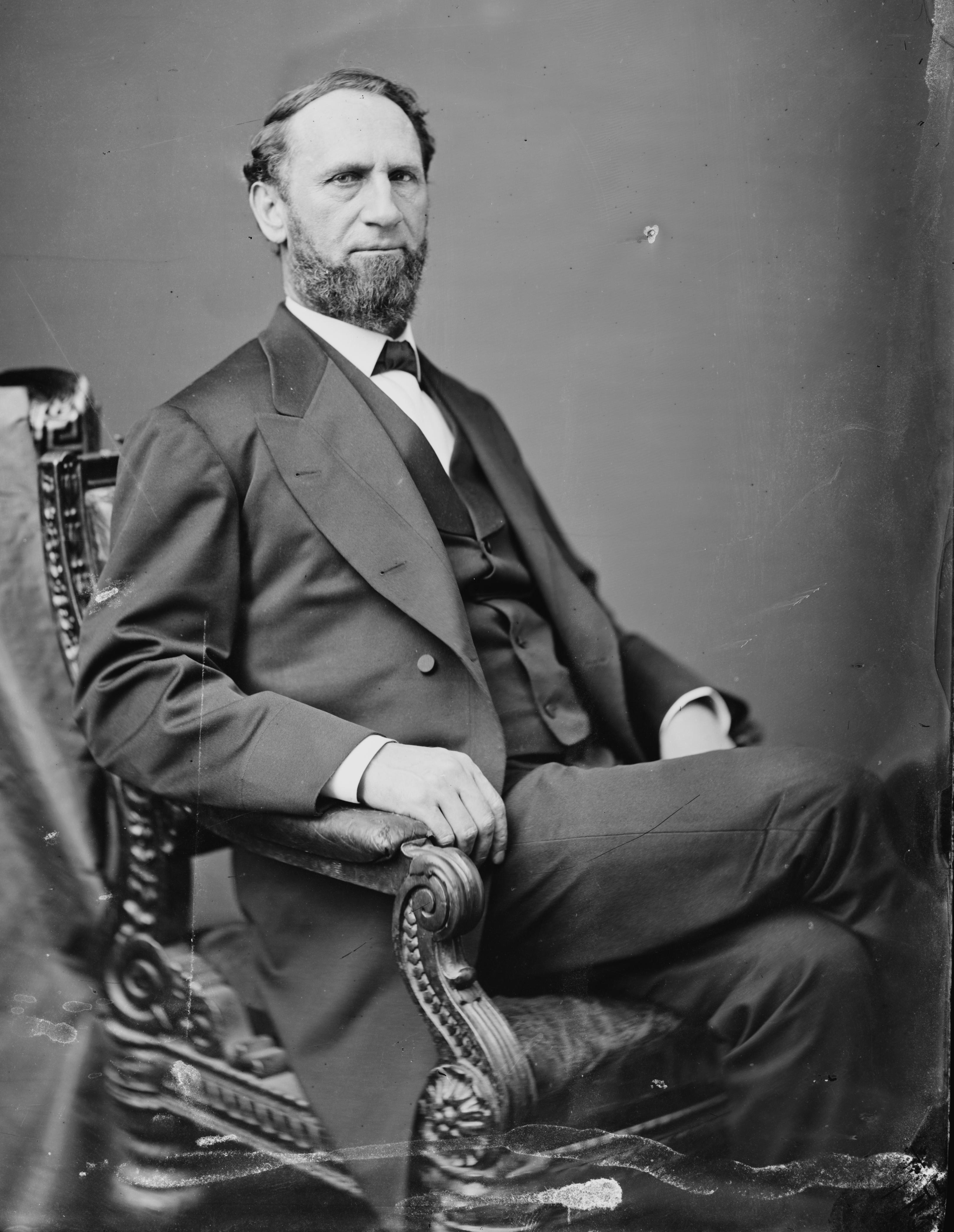
Ulysses Mercur

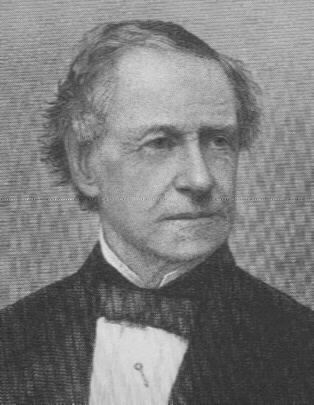
James Lawrence Bartol

| Alumni | Class year | Notability | References |
|---|---|---|---|
| James Lawrence Bartol | Jefferson 1832 | Judge of the Maryland Court of Appeals (1855–1883), serving as chief judge 1867–1883 | |
| Richard Coulter | Jefferson ? | Justice of the Supreme Court of Pennsylvania (1846–1852); U.S. congressman from Pennsylvania (1827–1835) | |
| John Hemphill | Jefferson 1825 | Chief justice of the Texas Supreme Court (1846–1858); U.S. senator from Texas (1859–1861), expelled after Texas' secession; delegate to the Provisional Confederate Congress | |
| Ulysses Mercur | Jefferson 1842 | Justice of the Supreme Court of Pennsylvania (1872–1887), serving as chief justice 1883–1887; U.S. congressman from Pennsylvania (1865–1872) | |
| Charles Page Thomas Moore | Jefferson 1852† | Justice of Supreme Court of Appeals of West Virginia; co-founder of Phi Kappa Psi fraternity at Jefferson College | |
| Josiah Scott | Jefferson 1823 | Justice of the Supreme Court of Ohio (1857–1872); chief justice during 1861, 1866, and 1871 terms | |
| D. Lindley Sloan | 1892 | Judge of the Maryland Court of Appeals (1926–1944), serving as chief judge 1943–1944 | |
| James Sterrett | Jefferson 1845 | Justice of the Supreme Court of Pennsylvania (1877–1900), serving as chief justice 1893–1900 | |
| Charles M. Thomson | 1899 | Judge of the Illinois Appellate Court (1917–1927); U.S. congressman from Illinois (1913–1915) | |
| Charles S. West | Jefferson 1845† | Justice of the Texas Supreme Court (1882–1885) | |
| William H. West | Jefferson 1846 | Judge of the Supreme Court of Ohio (1872–1873); Ohio attorney general (1866–1870) | |
| J. Foster Wilkin | ? | Justice of the Supreme Court of Ohio (1912–1914) | |
| Thomas Stokeley Wilson | Jefferson 1833 | Judge of the Supreme Court of Iowa Territory (1838–1839); judge of the Iowa Supreme Court (1849–1850) | |

=== State governors ===
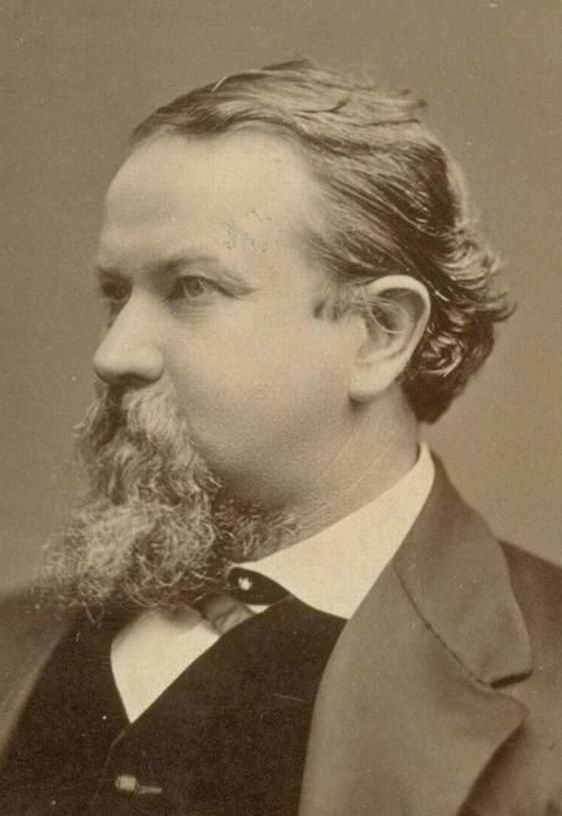
Milton Latham

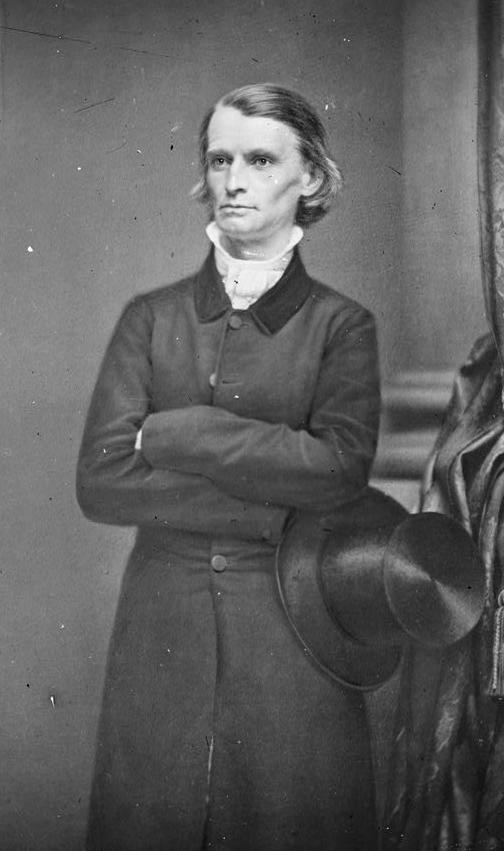
Henry A. Wise

| Alumni | Class year | Notability | References |
|---|---|---|---|
| Thomas W. Bartley | Jefferson 1829 | Governor of Ohio (1844); Ohio state senator (1841–1845), serving as speaker of the Senate in 1843 | |
| James Addams Beaver | Jefferson 1856 | Governor of Pennsylvania (1887–1891); acting president of Penn State University (1906–1908), where he is the namesake of Beaver Stadium; judge of the Pennsylvania Superior Court | |
| George Addison Crawford | Jefferson 1847 | Elected governor of Kansas in 1861, but the Kansas Supreme Court overturned the results | |
| John W. Geary | Jefferson 1839 | Governor of Pennsylvania (1867–1873); territorial governor of Kansas (1856–1857); first mayor of San Francisco (1850–1851); Union major general during the American Civil War | |
| William Thomas Hamilton | Jefferson 1840 | Governor of Maryland (1880–1884); U.S. senator from Maryland (1869–1875); U.S. congressman from Maryland (1849–1855) | |
| William Hendricks | Jefferson 1810 | Governor of Indiana (1822–1825); U.S. senator from Indiana (1825–1837); Indiana Territorial Legislature (1813–1814), serving as speaker in 1814; secretary of the first Indiana Constitutional Convention in 1816; U.S. congressman from Indiana (1816–1822) | |
| John S. Horner | Washington 1819 | Governor of Michigan Territory (1835–1836); secretary of Wisconsin Territory (1836–1837) | |
| Milton Latham | Jefferson 1845 | Governor of California (1859–1860); U.S. senator from California (1860–1863) | |
| Isaac Murphy | Washington ? | Reconstruction-era governor of Arkansas (1864–1868); served in the Arkansas House of Representatives, the Arkansas Senate, and the 1861 Arkansas State Convention, where he cast the lone vote against secession | |
| Israel Pickens | Jefferson 1802 | Governor of Alabama (1821–1825); U.S. senator from Alabama (1826); U.S. congressman from North Carolina (1811–1817) | |
| Leonidas Sexton | Jefferson 1847 | Lieutenant governor of Indiana (1873–1877); U.S. congressman from Indiana (1877–1879) | |
| Meldrim Thomson, Jr. | ? | Governor of New Hampshire (1973–1979) | |
| Henry A. Wise | Washington 1825 | Governor of Virginia (1856–1860); U.S. congressman from Virginia (1833–1844); U.S. ambassador to Brazil (1844–1847); Confederate brigadier general during the American Civil War | |

=== State and local ===
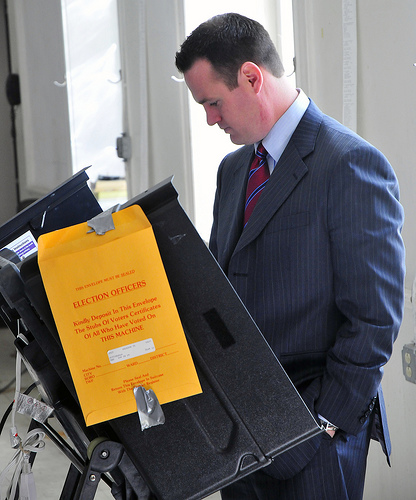
Luke Ravenstahl

| Alumni | Class year | Notability | References |
|---|---|---|---|
| Aquilla B. Caldwell | Jefferson 1833 | Attorney general of West Virginia (1863–1864, 1869–1870) | |
| Jim Christiana | 2006 | Pennsylvania state representative (2009–present) | |
| Thomas B. Hayward | | Member of the Maryland House of Delegates | |
| Jonathan Kearsley | Washington 1811 | Mayor of Detroit, Michigan (1826, 1829) | |
| William Caldwell Anderson Lawrence | Washington 1852 | Pennsylvania state representative (1857–1860), serving as speaker of the Pennsylvania House of Representatives 1859–1860 | |
| Victor Lescovitz | 1975 | Pennsylvania state representative (1980–2006) | |
| Charles Lucas | Jefferson 1810 | Missouri territorial legislator; killed in duel with U.S. Senator Thomas Hart Benton | |
| John M. Millikin | Washington 1824† | Ohio state treasurer (1876–1878) | |
| John B. Penington | Jefferson 1848 | Attorney general of Delaware (1874–1879); U.S. congressman from Delaware (1887–1891) | |
| Scott Petri | 1982 | Pennsylvania state representative (2003–present) | |
| Luke Ravenstahl | 2003 | Mayor of Pittsburgh (2006–2014) | |
| William P. Richardson | Washington 1844 | Ohio attorney general (1865); served in Union Army during American Civil War, losing use of right arm at Battle of Chancellorsville and achieving rank of brevet brigadier general | |
| James Smith | Jefferson 1857 | Secretary of state of Kansas (1878–1884) | |
| James Ross Snowden | Jefferson 1845 | Pennsylvania House of Representatives, Venango and Clarion counties (1838–1844), speaker (1842-1844) | |
| Barry Stout | 1964 | Pennsylvania state senator (1977–present); Pennsylvania state representative (1971–1976) | |
| John B. Trevor | Jefferson 1805 | Pennsylvania treasurer (1820–1821) | |
| Leo Trich | ? | Pennsylvania state representative (1989–2002); developer instrumental in building CONSOL Energy Park | |
| Jesse White | 2000 | Pennsylvania state representative (2007–present) | |
| Christopher Wolcott | Washington 1840 | Ohio attorney general (1856–1860); U.S. assistant secretary of war (1862–1863); Ohio delegate to Peace Conference of 1861 | |

== Business ==
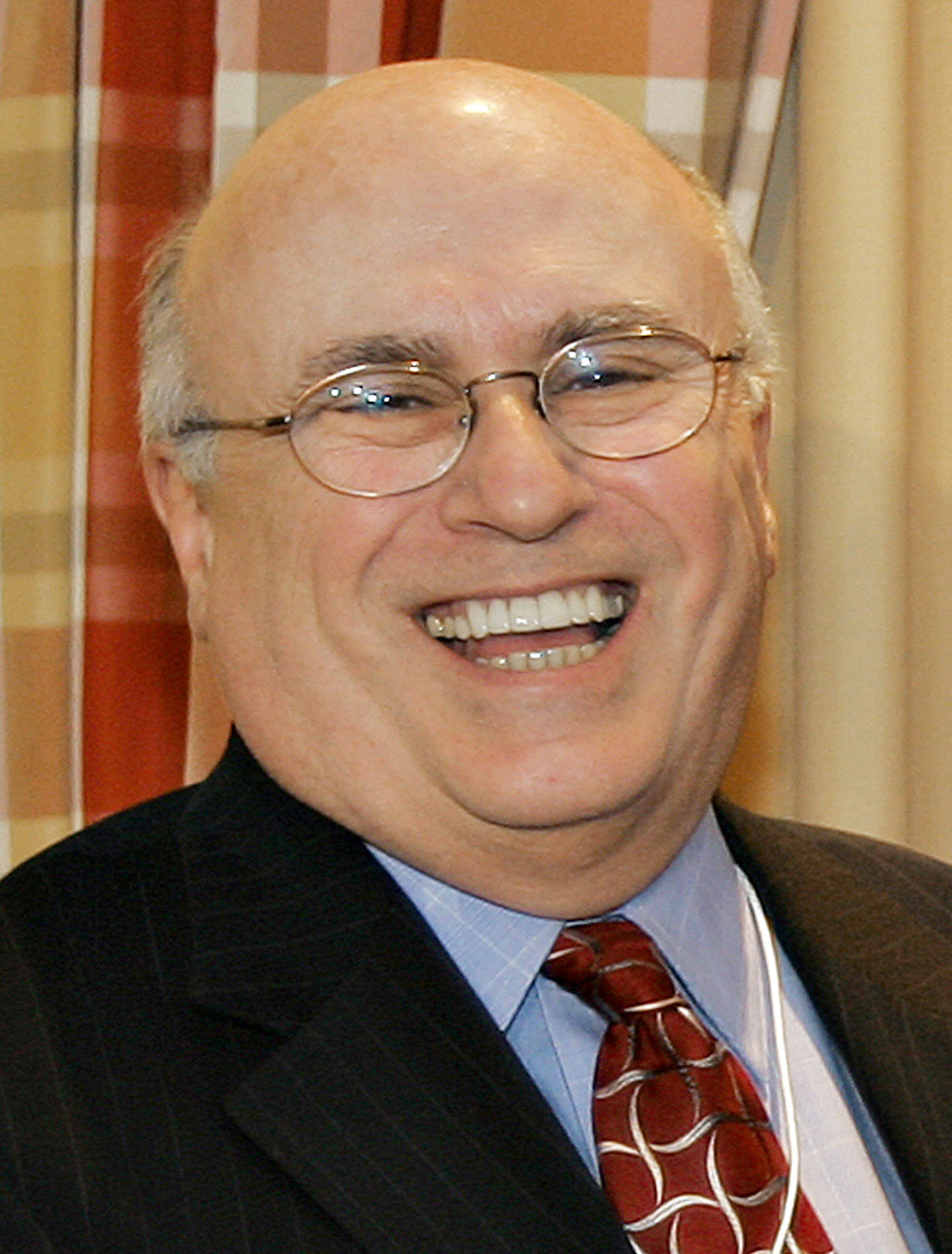
Richard Clark

| Alumni | Class year | Notability | References |
|---|---|---|---|
| Richard Clark | 1968 | President and CEO of Merck & Co. (2006–present) | |
| Kenneth R. Melani | 1975 | President and CEO of Highmark | |
| John S. Reed | 1962 | Chairman of the New York Stock Exchange (2003–2005); chairman of Citigroup (1984–2000) | |
| Johnson C. Smith | ? | Co-founder of the McKeesport Tin Plate Company and director of the People's Bank in McKeesport; Johnson C. Smith University, a historically Black college in Charlotte, North Carolina, is named after him | |
| Alberto Vilar | 1962 | Former billionaire; founder of Amerindo Investment Advisors, convicted of 12 counts of securities fraud and money laundering and sentenced to nine years in prison; his multi-million pledges to the college never materialized | |

== Arts ==
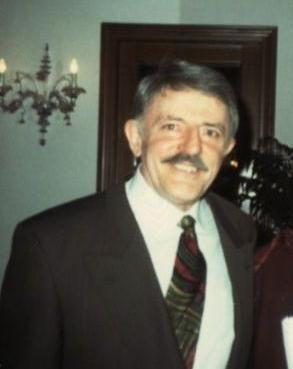
John Astin

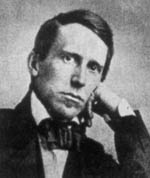
Stephen Foster

| Alumni | Class year | Notability | References |
|---|---|---|---|
| John Astin | 1952† | Actor of The Addams Family and Batman fame | |
| Francis Chapin | 1921 | Artist known for his work in oil and watercolor; called "dean of Chicago painters" | |
| Lindsey Coffey | 2014 | Miss Earth 2020; first American to win | |
| Frank Cowan | Jefferson 1865† | Author, physician, newspaper publisher, and personal secretary to President Andrew Johnson; best known for constructing a hoax, claiming the discovery of the remains of an Icelandic Christian woman near the Potomac River, proving that America had been "discovered" five centuries before Christopher Columbus | |
| Nicholas P. Dallis | 1933 | Creator of the newspaper comic strip Rex Morgan, M.D.; won the 1933 Eastern Intercollegiate Boxing Championship in the 165-pound weight class | |
| Stephen Foster | Jefferson 1841† | 19th-century songwriter of American folk classics "Oh! Susanna", "Camptown Races", "My Old Kentucky Home", "Old Black Joe", "Beautiful Dreamer" and "Old Folks at Home", among others; attended Washington & Jefferson but never finished; sources conflict on whether he was expelled or left voluntarily | |
| Charles M. Kurtz | 1876 | Art director of the St. Louis Exposition of 1904 | |
| Samuel Mosheim Schmucker | Washington 1840 | American historian and author | |

== Athletics ==
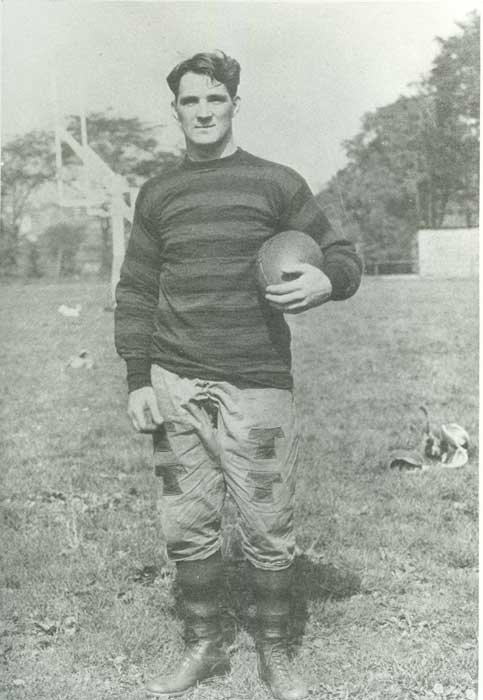
Bill Amos

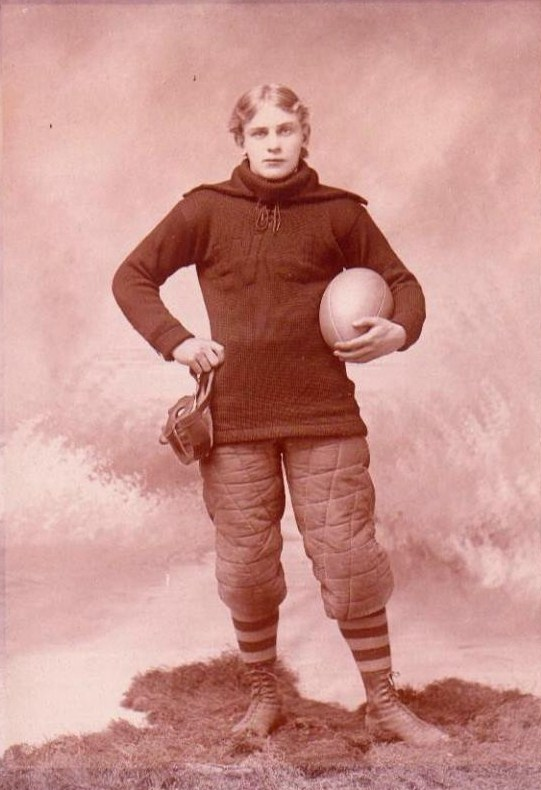
John Brallier

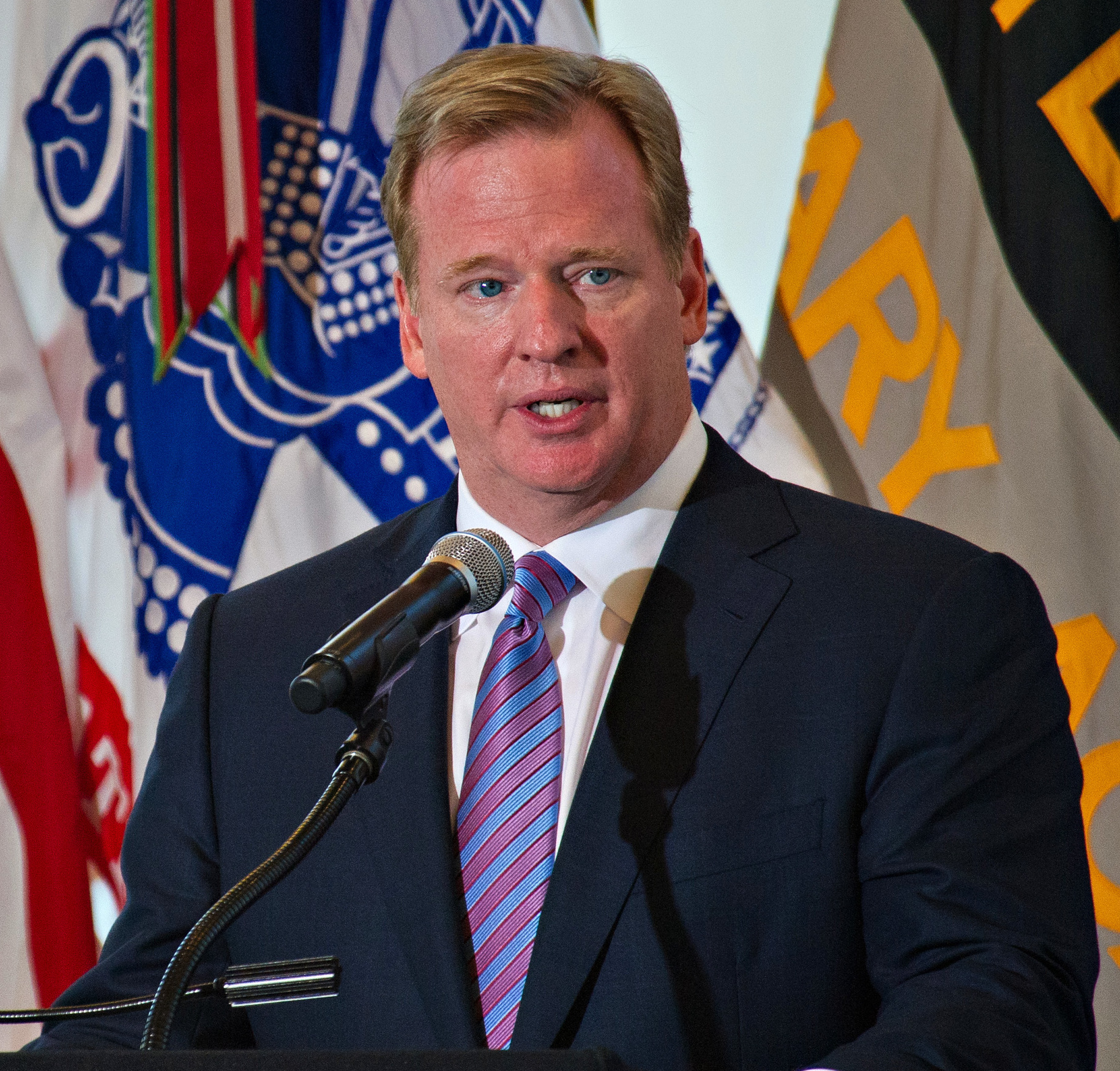
Roger Goodell

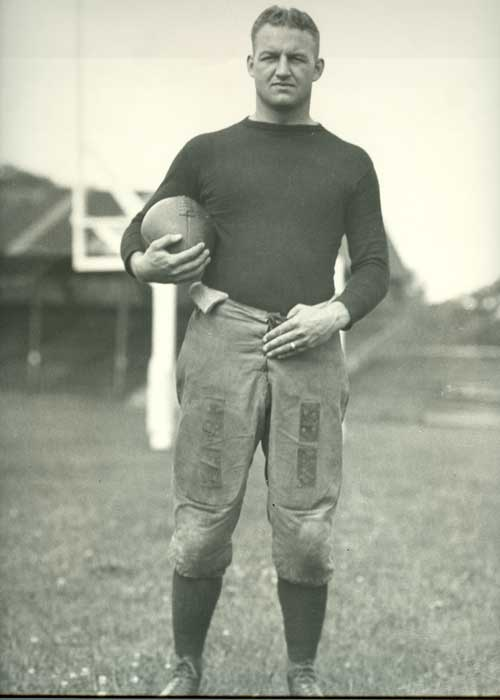
Russ Stein

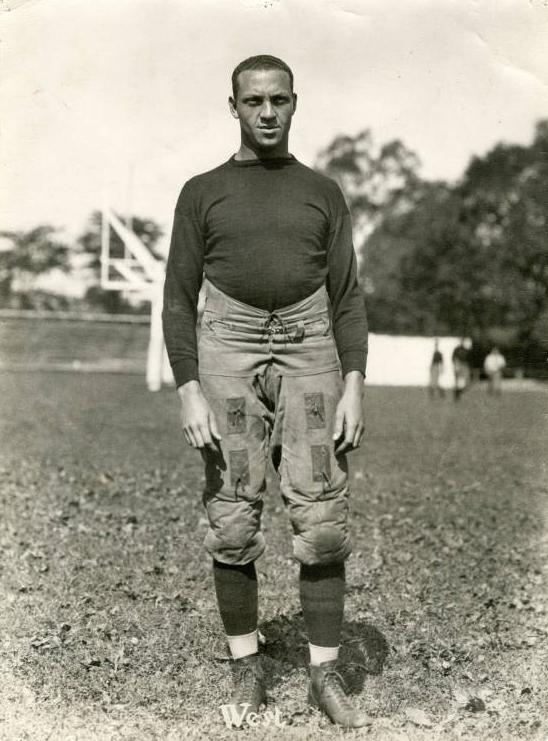
Charles Pruner West

| Alumni | Class year | Notability | References |
|---|---|---|---|
| Ody Abbott | ? | MLB outfielder for the St. Louis Cardinals (1910–1911) | |
| Bill Amos | ? | Head coach of Washington & Jefferson Presidents football team (1929–1931) | |
| John Brallier | 1895† | First openly paid professional football player | |
| Wayne Brenkert | ? | Professional football player for the Akron Pros, where he also served as head coach | |
| Bird Carroll | ? | Professional football player with the Canton Bulldogs (1921–1925), winning the NFL Championship in 1922 and 1923 | |
| Forrest Douds | 1930 | Professional football player for the Portsmouth Spartans, Providence Steam Roller, Chicago Cardinals, and the Pittsburgh Pirates; member of the 1930 NFL All-Pro Team; first head coach of the Pittsburgh Steelers in 1933 | |
| Hal Erickson | ? | Professional football player 1923–1930, winning the 1925 NFL Championship with the Chicago Cardinals; head coach for the Milwaukee Badgers (1924) | |
| Edgar Garbisch | 1920† | Member of the College Football Hall of Fame | |
| Doc Gessler | 1901† | Major League Baseball right fielder and physician, playing for five teams during his 8-year career; played in the 1906 World Series for the Chicago Cubs; team captain of the Boston Red Sox in 1909; manager of the Pittsburgh Rebels of the Federal League in 1914 | |
| Roger Goodell | 1981 | Commissioner of the National Football League (2006–present) | |
| Howard Groskloss | | MLB second baseman for the Pittsburgh Pirates (1930–1932), attended W & J in his freshman year (1926–1927), then transferred to Amherst | |
| Charlie Guy | ? | Professional football player for the Detroit Heralds, Detroit Tigers, Buffalo All-Americans, Cleveland Indians, and the Dayton Triangles; was named to the 1923 NFL All-Pro team | |
| Chuck Heberling | 1949 | National Football League official, where he was referee for The Drive and was on the officiating crew for three Super Bowls; executive director of Western Pennsylvania Interscholastic Athletic League (1972–1998) | |
| Pete Henry | 1919 | Professional football player and coach; member of the College Football Hall of Fame and Pro Football Hall of Fame | |
| Paul T. Hogan | ? | Professional football player, winning the 1926 NFL Championship with the Frankford Yellow Jackets | |
| Buddy Jeannette | 1938 | National Basketball League player; member of the Basketball Hall of Fame; later coached the Pittsburgh Pipers of the American Basketball Association | |
| Herb Kopf | 1925 | Professional football coach for Manhattan College (1938–1942) and the Boston Yanks (1944–1946); member of the Washington & Jefferson Presidents' 1922 Rose Bowl team | |
| Ray Neal | ? | Professional football coach and player; head coach at DePauw University | |
| Andy Oyler | ? | Major League Baseball player; known in baseball lore for hitting the shortest home run in history: 24 inches | |
| Joe Philbin | 1984 | Head coach of the Miami Dolphins (2012–present); offensive coordinator for the Green Bay Packers (2007–2012) | |
| Fred Shirey | ? | Professional football player for the Cleveland Rams and the Green Bay Packers; drafted by the Philadelphia Eagles in the 5th round (32nd overall) of the 1938 NFL draft | |
| Johnny Spiegel | ? | 1914 College Football All-America Team Consensus selection | |
| Bill Steen | 1911† | Major League Baseball pitcher for the Cleveland Indians and Detroit Tigers (1912–1915) | |
| Russ Stein | 1921 | Professional football player; member of the Pottsville Maroons involved in the 1925 NFL Championship controversy; member of the Washington & Jefferson College's 1922 Rose Bowl team, where he was MVP | |
| Dan Towler | ? | Professional football player for the Los Angeles Rams (1950–1955); five-time Pro Bowler; the NFL's leading rusher in 1951; won the 1951 NFL Championship Game | |
| Ralph Vince | 1923 | Professional football player and coach; member of the 1922 Rose Bowl team | |
| Charles Fremont West | 1924 | College football player and track star, first African-American to play quarterback in the Rose Bowl; later became a respected medical doctor | |

== Medicine ==
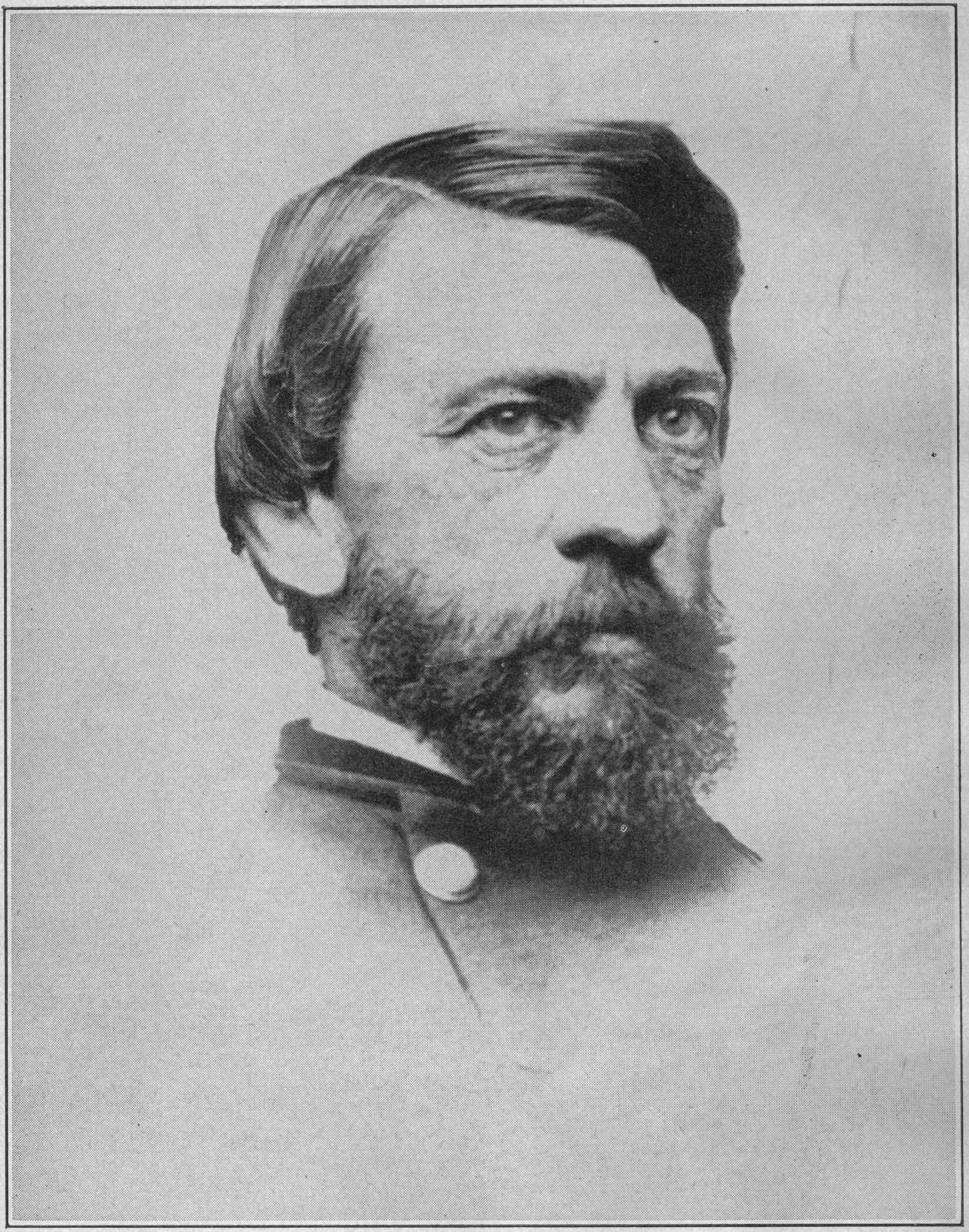
Jonathan Letterman

| Alumni | Class year | Notability | References |
|---|---|---|---|
| John Hupp | Washington 1844 | Prominent physician in Wheeling, West Virginia, pioneering the use of chloral hydrate for treatment of puerperal mania; served as supervisor of Ohio County, West Virginia, instituting educational reforms to expand free schooling to African-American children; studied medicine under Francis Julius LeMoyne | |
| Jesse Lazear | 1888† | Physician; confirmed that yellow fever was transmitted via mosquito by infecting himself with the disease; transferred to Johns Hopkins University after two years | |
| Jonathan Letterman | Jefferson 1849 | Surgeon known as the "father of battlefield medicine" | |
| Dennis Slamon | 1962 | Oncologist and chief of the division of Hematology-Oncology at UCLA; best known for research identifying the HER2/neu oncogene that is amplified in 25–33% of breast cancer patients and the resulting treatment, herceptin | |

== Theology ==
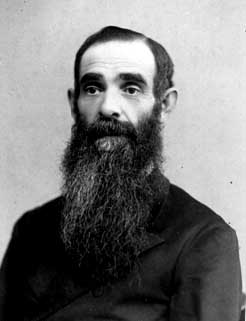
Hunter Corbett

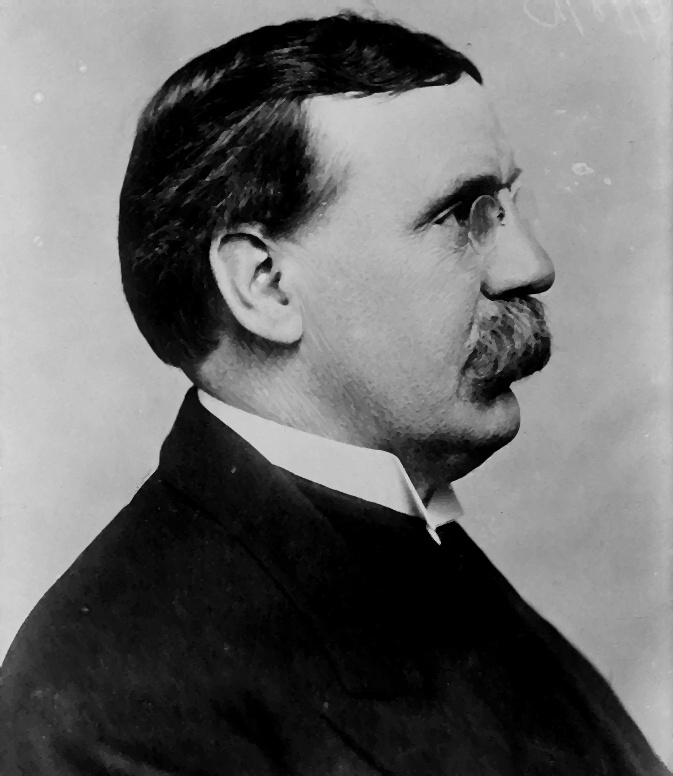
Henry Collin Minton

| Alumni | Class year | Notability | References |
|---|---|---|---|
| Lorrin Andrews | Jefferson 1823 | | |
| Robert Baird | Jefferson 1818 | Prominent Presbyterian clergyman; author of Religion in America | |
| Hunter Corbett | Jefferson 1860 | Presbyterian missionary to Chefoo, China | |
| Arthur Henry Ewing | ? | Missionary to India; namesake of Ewing Christian College | |
| James Caruthers Rhea Ewing | 1876 | Missionary to India | |
| David Hummell Greer | Washington 1862 | Bishop of the Episcopal Church in the United States; namesake of the Greer School | |
| James McGready | Smith ? McMillan ? | Presbyterian minister and revivalist, becoming one of the leading figures in the Second Great Awakening; studied with college founders Joseph Smith and John McMillan | |
| David McKinney | Jefferson 1821 | Founder and editor of Presbyterian Banner | |
| Henry Collin Minton | 1879 | Chairman of Systematic Theology at San Francisco Theological Seminary | |
| William A. Passavant | Jefferson 1840 | Lutheran minister noted for the many orphanages and hospitals ministries he founded; commemorated in the Calendar of Saints of the Lutheran Church on November 24 | |
| Thomas Smith Williamson | Jefferson 1817 | Missionary to the Dakota who helped translate the first Dakota-language Bible | |
| Joseph R. Wilson | Jefferson 1844 | Theologian; father of Woodrow Wilson | |

== Other ==
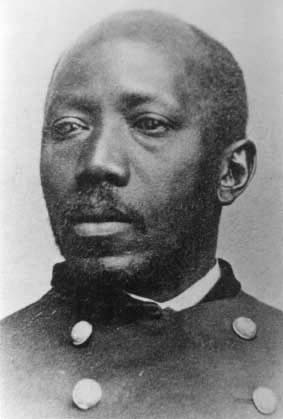
Martin Delany

| Alumni | Class year | Notability | References |
|---|---|---|---|
| Martin Robison Delany | Jefferson 1832† | Early African-American abolitionist; first African-American field officer (major) in the United States Army during the American Civil War; arguably the first proponent of American black nationalism; studied classics, Latin, and Greek at Jefferson College | |
| Al Helfer | ? | Radio sportscaster, known as "Mr. Radio Baseball"; played football and basketball at Washington & Jefferson College | |
| M. Gerald Schwartzbach | 1966 | California criminal defense attorney noted for high-profile cases, including successfully defending actor Robert Blake in his 2004 trial for murder | |
| Jon Soltz | 1999 | Iraq War veteran, political activist, and founder of VoteVets.org | |
| Raymond Yong | 1952 | Canadian environmental engineer and winner of the 1985 Isaak-Walton-Killam Award | |
