= Technology Center (Washington & Jefferson College) =

Academic building in Pennsylvania, USA

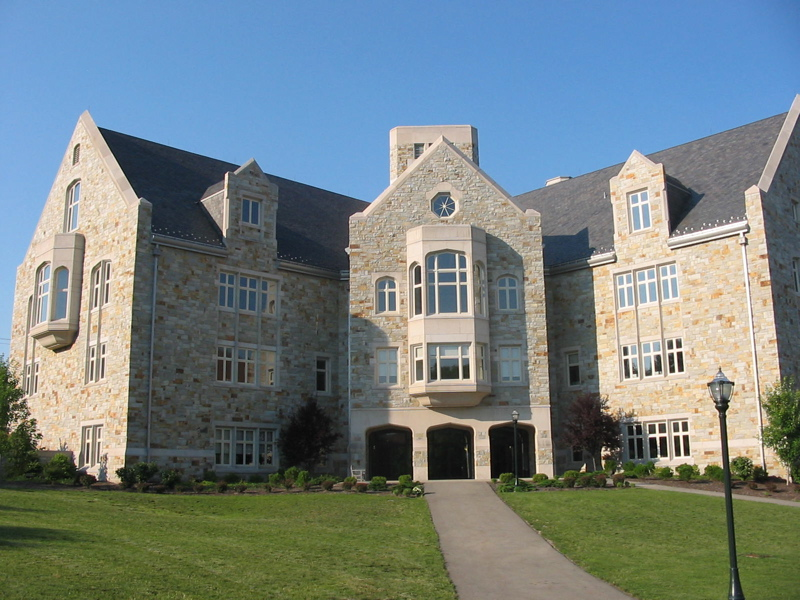
- Technology Center, as viewed from Presidents' Row
- Interactive map of the Technology Center area

General information
- Type: Academic
- Location: Washington, Pennsylvania
- Coordinates: 40°10′17.7″N 80°14′18.9″W
- Inaugurated: Fall 2003
- Cost: $29.6 million

Technical details
- Floor count: 4 floors
- Floor area: 74,000 square feet (6,900 m^{2})

Design and construction
- Architects: MacLachlan Cornelius & Filoni
- Main contractor: Landau Building Company

The Technology Center is an academic building on the campus of Washington & Jefferson College housing the Information Technology Leadership program. It houses over 200 instructional computers for use by the Information Technology Leadership and related classes. A statue of a coal miner, representing the work ethic and spirit of Western Pennsylvania, sits in the green space in front of the building.

The building was known as the Vilar Technology Center, in honor of alum Alberto Vilar, who had pledged $18.1 million to construct the building. After he reneged on that pledge in 2003, the building was renamed the Technology Center and plans for it were scaled back. It is the sister building to The Burnett Center, sharing the same architect and general contractor.

== Facilities ==
Quest for Knowledge by Alan Cottrill

The Technology Center is a four floor Gothic granite building with 74,000 square feet (6,900 m^{2}) of floor space, including a "Global Learning Unit," classrooms, seminar rooms, and faculty and administrative offices." The building had over 200 instructional computers for use by the Information Technology Leadership and related classes The ground floor has an "Open Lab" of 39 computers for use by the campus community.

In 2007, a statue of a coal miner sculpted by local artist Alan Cottrill was erected outside the Technology Center. It is intended to represent the work ethic and spirit of Western Pennsylvania, as well as the dream that an education can allow people a chance to escape the coal mines.

== Information Technology Leadership ==
The building was designed for, and is primarily used by, the Information Technology Leadership program. This academic discipline studies the traditional Information Technology field as a liberal art, where the core principles and interdisciplinary connections of the field are examined. Students in this program take a standard curriculum, augmented with focused study in one of 4 possible fields: computer science, data discovery, information systems, and new media technologies.

In 2002, Pennsylvania Congressman and former student John Murtha, who was a long-time chair of the House Appropriations Defense Subcommittee, procured a $2.7 million defense appropriation for the Information Technology Leadership program to develop a remote educational program to would train members of the National Guard in technology skills, ranging from basic computer literacy to advanced applications.

== Funding and name change ==
In 1999, the college announced that it would build a new building, to be called the Vilar Technology Center, named after billionaire alum and well-known opera philanthropist Alberto Vilar, who had pledged $15 million to the project, a pledge that would have been the largest in the college's history. His pledges for the building eventually reached $18.1 million. Amid Vilar's falling fortunes during the stock market decreases in 2001 and 2002, Vilar had reneged on a pledges to a number of organizations, including his pledge to the college. By 2003, plans for the building were scaled back and the building had been opened as the Technology Center, without reference to Vilar. In 2005, Vilar was charged with fraud and theft of money from his financial company. In a statement in 2005, the college declined to release how much of Vilar's pledge had been fulfilled.

Other, more successful, fundraising vehicles for the construction cost include donations through the "Revolutionary! The Campaign for Washington & Jefferson College" fundraising campaign. Several charitable foundations donated money to the campaign, including the Eden Hall Foundation and the Hillman Foundation. Construction costs for the building were reportedly $29.6 million. The college was able to issue a municipal bond through the Allegheny County Higher Education Building Authority to finance a portion of the building's construction.

== Planning, design, and construction ==
The plans for the four-story Gothic granite building took place during the tenure of President Brian C. Mitchell. Like its sister building, The Burnett Center, the architectural plans for the Technology Center were designed by MacLachlan Cornelius & Filoni and the general contracting services were performed by The Landau Building Company.

In 2003, the building was awarded the IMI Golen Award and was a finalist for the Master Builders’ Association's Excellence in Craftsmanship Award. Construction on the building was completed in fall 2003.
