= Massenburg =

Betty Massenburg is a surname. Notable people with the surname include:

- G. Alvin Massenburg (1894–1968), American politician
- George Massenburg, American recording engineer and inventor
- Kedar Massenburg (born 1963), American record producer and record label executive
- Tony Massenburg (born 1967), American basketball player
- Walter B. Massenburg (born 1949), retired US Navy admiral
