= Four Star Pizza =

Irish pizza chain

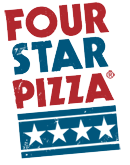
- Company type: Private
- Industry: Pizza delivery Take-out
- Founded: Washington, Pennsylvania, US, 1981; 45 years ago
- Founders: Alan Cottrill; Susan Cottrill
- Headquarters: Dublin, Ireland
- Number of locations: 60
- Products: Pizza; Submarine sandwiches; Chicken wings; Dessert
- Owner: Four Star Pizza (Ireland) Ltd
- Website: www.fourstarpizza.ie

Four Star Pizza is a fast food pizza company which operates throughout Ireland. It originated in Washington, Pennsylvania, US, in 1981 by Alan and Susan Cottrill, who previously operated Domino's Pizza stores in Ohio. Besides sharing the English language, Alan Cottrill sensed a market for American style delivery pizza, and traveled to Ireland in 1986 to launch the chain in Dublin. The first outlet in Ireland opened in 1986.

Michael Holland and his company Gonville Ltd took over the Irish and UK franchises in 2011.

By 2020, there are 60 outlets across the island of Ireland with plans to open further shops in Ireland and further expansion into Britain during the year.
