= Gary A. Tanaka =

American businessman

- Born: June 23, 1943 (age 83); Hunt, Idaho
- Education: Imperial College London; MIT
- Occupations: Businessman: Securities fraudster Financier; Racehorse owner
- Children: 2

Gary A. Tanaka (born June 23, 1943, in Hunt, Idaho) is an American businessman, convicted securities fraudster, sportsman and philanthropist who co-founded the investment company Amerindo Investment Advisors in 1979 along with Alberto Vilar.

== Early life and education ==
Tanaka was born during World War II in the Minidoka Internment Camp in Idaho during the period of Japanese internment. He graduated from MIT, then earned a PhD degree at Imperial College London in the United Kingdom with a dissertation on the mathematics of the transition from laminar to turbulent flow in a fluid flowing over a solid surface.

== Personal life ==
Tanaka lives in London with his wife and two children in a house which was once Dwight D. Eisenhower's wartime headquarters. Tanaka has two adult sons, Mark Tanaka, who is also a fund manager, most recently of Sanno Point Capital Management and Michael Tanaka, a notable businessman based in the UK.

== Philanthropy ==
Tanaka was known for his donation of £27m to Imperial College, which resulted in construction of the Tanaka Building in 2004, designed by the international architecture, planning and design studio Foster and Partners. The building houses Imperial College Business School, and combines the business school's facilities with a new front entrance for the college. He was also known for the high-profile court case against him in 2008.

In August 2008, the Business School at Imperial College London was renamed from "Tanaka Business School" to "Imperial College Business School" both because the old name did not strongly emphasise its association with the college, and because Tanaka was found guilty of fraud the same year.

== Legal issues ==
Tanaka was tried in 2008 in New York for a $20 million fraud against customers of the Amerindo investment company he ran with Alberto Vilar. In November 2008 he was found guilty of conspiracy, securities fraud and investment adviser fraud. Tanaka was sentenced to five years in jail in early 2010. The sentence was later extended to six years.

== Thoroughbred horse racing ==
Gary A. Tanaka was a prominent owner in thoroughbred horse racing, known for campaigning successful horses globally. His stable had notable success in Europe, North America, and Asia, with wins in races such as the Hong Kong Mile and the Singapore Airlines International Cup. Tanaka's strategy often involved acquiring horses already demonstrating success in Europe and bringing them to race in the United States, where higher purses could increase their value for resale and breeding.

However, Tanaka's involvement in racing was also affected by legal issues related to his investment firm, Amerindo Investment Advisors, which he co-founded with Alberto Vilar. In 2008, Tanaka was found guilty of conspiracy, securities fraud, and investment adviser fraud. He was sentenced to five years in prison in 2010, according to BloodHorse. This conviction led to him transferring ownership of his US-based racehorses.

Despite these legal challenges, Tanaka's stable boasted several significant horses during his time in the sport, including multiple Graded Stakes winners and Eclipse Award winners.

== See also ==
- Amerindo Investment Advisors
