= Amerindo Investment Advisors =

Defunct financial services firm

Amerindo Investment Advisors Inc.
- Amerindo's logo, c. 1997
- Industry: Investment services
- Headquarters: 399 Park Avenue, New York City, New York
- Number of locations: 3 London, England
- Key people: Alberto Vilar; Gary Tanaka

Amerindo Investment Advisors Inc. was an Investment services firm, best known for making large profits during the Dot-com boom of the 1990s and 2000s.

== History ==
The origins of the company date to the early 1980s, when Alberto Vilar and Gary A. Tanaka founded two companies named "Amerindo" in England and Panama. The American branch, called "Amerindo Investment Advisors Inc." was founded in 1985.

Vilar made an early successful investment in Yahoo!, which once totaled 40% of the fund's investment portfolio. Vilar's financial strategy included purchasing shares of companies shortly after their initial public offering. Vilar gained a lot of press for declaring the internet to be "bigger than the Industrial Revolution."

The company's "flagship" financial product, the "Amerindo Technology Fund", was known for investing in startup high-tech and Dot-com companies. Following many years of strong growth during the internet boom, the fund came to a crash. Amerindo had advertised that its "Guaranteed Fixed Rate Deposit Account" (GFRDA) would be invested in "high quality, short-term deposits" that would produce a "fixed-rate of interest for a fixed-term." Instead, these funds were invested in risky dot com ventures, and the fund lost large sums after the 2000 dot-com bust, which meant that Amerindo couldn't repay the investors, costing investors millions of dollars.

=== Fraudulent activities ===
Amerindo investor Lily Cates, mother of actress Phoebe Cates, invested $5 million in the "Amerindo Small Business Investment Company" venture, but most of her investment was rerouted to pay for Amerindo's business expenses, donated to various charities to which Vilar had made pledges that he couldn't afford, and to pay a settlement from a former client who was suing Amerindo about the GFRDA account. In September 2003, Vilar ordered an employee to copy Cates' signature onto a document that purported to authorize a $250,000 transfer, with most of that money going into Vilar's personal account. In 2005, Cates filed a complaint with the U.S. Securities and Exchange Commission regarding Vilar and Amerindo. During the investigation, Vilar lied to the SEC, claiming that Cates wasn't a client and that he did not own the Panamanian subsidiary.

In 2005, Vilar and Tanaka were convicted for organizing a series of transactions that defrauded their clients. After the nine-week trial, Vilar was convicted of two counts of securities fraud, two counts of wire fraud, four counts of money laundering, investment advisor fraud, mail fraud, making false statements, and participating in a conspiracy to commit securities fraud. Tanaka was convicted of three of the twelve counts with which he was charged: securities fraud, investment adviser fraud, conspiracy to commit securities fraud, wire fraud, mail fraud, and money laundering.
