= Joseph Smith (Presbyterian minister, born 1796) =

Presbyterian minister, author, and academic (1796–?)

- Born: July 15, 1796
- Died: Unknown; Greensburg, Pennsylvania
- Parent: Rev. David Smith
- Relatives: Joseph Smith (Grandfather)

Ecclesiastical career
- Offices held: President of Franklin College

Joseph Smith (July 15, 1796–?) was a Presbyterian minister, author, and academic.

The son of Rev. Joseph Smith and grandson of Joseph Smith, the frontier missionary, he graduated from Jefferson College (now Washington & Jefferson College) in 1815, and attended Princeton Theological Seminary from 1817 to 1818. He was licensed to preach in 1819, and worked as a missionary in Virginia from 1818 to 1822. He was President of Franklin College in New Athens, Ohio from 1837 to 1838. Smith died in Greensburg, Pennsylvania.

Academic offices
| Preceded by Johnson Welsh | President of Franklin College; 1837–1838 | Succeeded by Jacob Coon |
