= Kenneth Melani =

American physician

Kenneth R. Melani
- Born: 1954 (age 71–72); New Kensington, Pennsylvania
- Education: Washington & Jefferson College; Bowman Gray School of Medicine
- Known for: CEO of Highmark
- Children: 3 daughters

Kenneth R. Melani is the former president and chief executive officer of Highmark, a health insurance company based in Pittsburgh and the largest health insurer in Pennsylvania. Before his abrupt departure from Highmark in 2012, he was one of the most powerful health insurance executives in the country. At his peak in 2012, Melani was in charge of a Highmark that was $14.6 billion company and had millions of policyholders, for which he was paid $4 million annually.

== Family and early life ==
He was born to an Italian Catholic family in New Kensington, Pennsylvania. He grew up in Arnold, Pennsylvania, where his childhood home nearly caved-in due to mine subsidence. The family later moved to Cheswick, Pennsylvania, where he attended Springdale High School, part of the Allegheny Valley School District. He attended Washington & Jefferson College, where he was president of Kappa Sigma fraternity and played on the basketball team. He graduated in 1975 with a chemistry degree. He married in 1975 and had two daughters with his first wife.

== Medical school and medical practice ==
He enrolled in the Bowman Gray School of Medicine in North Carolina and pursued pediatric oncology for a time before specializing in adult internal medicine. He earned board certification in internal medicine from the American Board of Internal Medicine. He returned to Pennsylvania in 1979 for a 3-year residency at the West Penn Allegheny Health System.

In 1982, he started his own practice, Melani & Wilfong, with colleague Donald Wilfong from Johnstown, Pennsylvania. Soon Melani began to take a strong role in the business side of the practice, building a presence in hospitals and nursing homes. He began to take on work for West Penn Cares, a company of West Penn-affiliated physicians, developing business opportunities with a commercial blood laboratory and in-home intravenous therapy devices. During his 4 1/2 years as CEO of that company, he left the active practice of medicine to more fully pursue the business side of the medical field.

== Health insurance executive ==
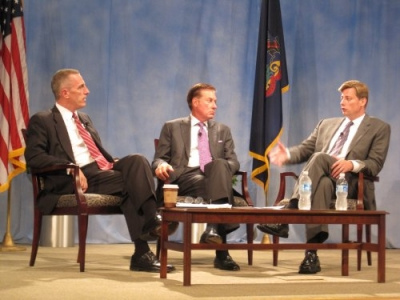
Melani (center) at a 2011 healthcare summit with Congressmen Timothy F. Murphy (left) and Jason Altmire (right).

In 1989, he was appointed chief medical officer for Blue Cross of Western Pennsylvania. The position had historically been staid one, typically filled by a doctor nearing retirement. Instead, Melani, who was a generation younger than his peers, took the Blue Cross on a new direction, especially the Health Related Services division and Keystone Health Plan West. He pushed Blue Cross towards the managed care model of health services delivery, a move that proved to be prescient as that model would control over 85% of the market by 1996. Melani was appointed named vice president of strategic business development and health services of the new joint company. During this time, Blue Cross of Western Pennsylvania merged with Harrisburg's Pennsylvania Blue Shield, which proved to be administratively difficult to manage and saw significant operating losses for some time. The company was re-christened Highmark

The company's expansion continued as the company continued to purchase practices and companies as a hedge against the rival and tenuous partner University of Pittsburgh Medical Center (UPMC). In 2002, UPMC threatened to withdraw from the Highmark network, a huge disruption in service for Western Pennsylvania. Melani personally negotiated a 10-year deal with UPMC to remain in the Highmark network. The deal catapulted Melani to the position CEO of Highmark in 2003. He remained at "war" with UPMC for the remainder of his time at Highmark.

In 2008, Melani led an effort to merge Highmark with Philadelphia's Independence Blue Cross. Melani was slated to be CEO of the new joint company and it 26,000 employees, 7 million policyholders, and a total of $24 billion in operations. The merger plan was abandoned after state regulators made approval contingent on requirement that Highmark deemed unfeasible.

Melani then initiated Highmark's successful effort in acquiring West Penn Allegheny Health System, another Western Pennsylvania health provider, as a bulwark against rival UPMC. Amid the battle between the two insurers, Melani and UPMC CEO Jeffrey Romoff had a high level of personal animosity.

== Personal issues and termination from Highmark ==
On March 25, 2012, Melani was involved in a domestic dispute in Oakmont, Pennsylvania. On April 1, 2012, his employment with Highmark was terminated. He was charged with criminal trespass and simple assault and went on an unpaid leave of absence from Highmark. The incident had an immediate impact on Highmark, as it had come amid the controversial attempt to acquire West Penn. Even Moody's Investors Service downgraded Highmark's credit rating.

With respect to Melani's ongoing feud with UPMC, the Pittsburgh Post-Gazette said "When the story became public, you could almost hear the gleeful scorn emanating from UPMC corporate suites...and now the good doctor has handed (UPMC President) Mr. Romoff another arrow for his "get Highmark" quiver."

A few months after Melani's termination, his replacement worked out a long-sought deal with UPMC to last until 2015.

That June, Melani's charges were withdrawn after he completed anger management classes.

== Awards and service ==
He was awarded W&J College's "Entrepreneur of the Year Award" in 2009.

He has served on the Washington & Jefferson College board of trustees.
