= John Hupp =

American physician

John Cox Hupp
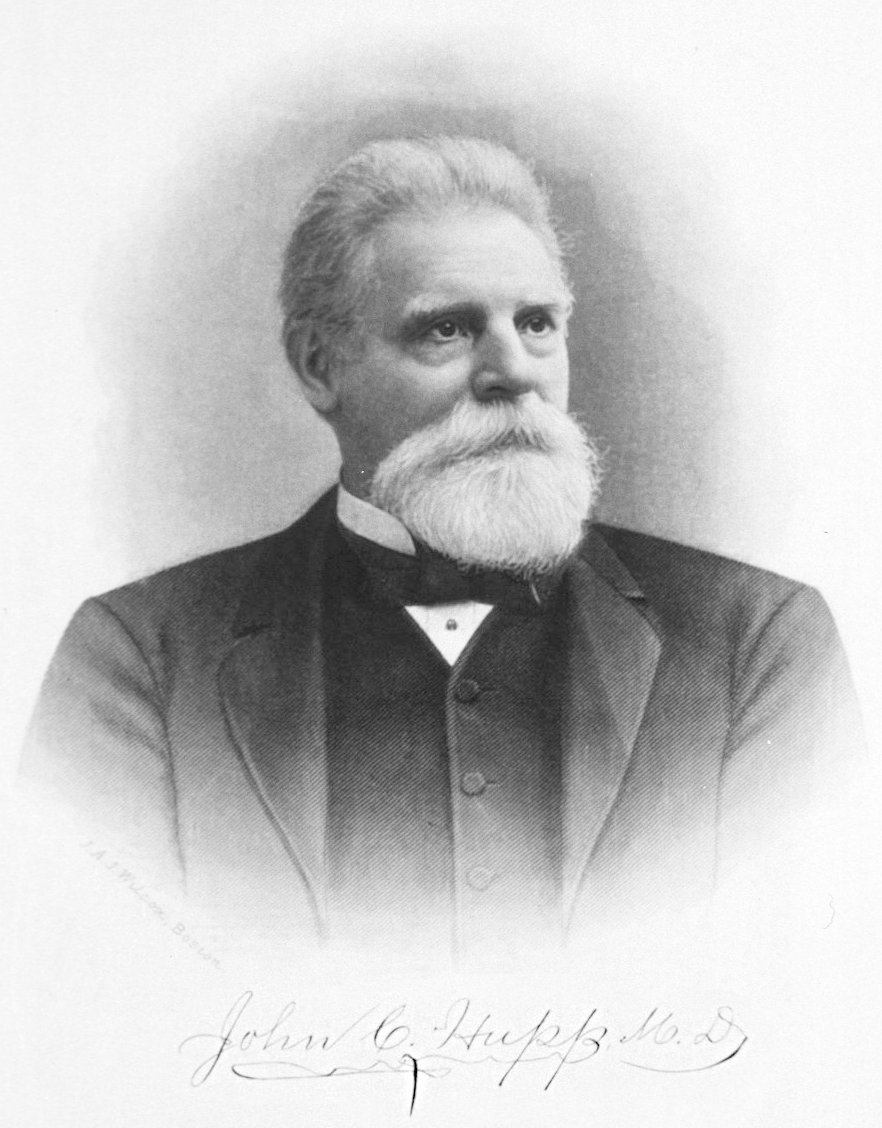
- Born: November 24, 1819
- Died: November 19, 1908 (aged 88)
- Education: Washington College (1844); Jefferson Medical College (1847)
- Occupation: physician

John Cox Hupp (November 24, 1819 – November 19, 1908) was a noted physician of Wheeling, West Virginia. He was known for his contributions to the City of Wheeling and educational reform.

== Life ==
Hupp came from a family of pioneers and was the grandson of Anne Hupp. He was born in Donegal, Washington County, Pennsylvania on November 24, 1819. Hupp graduated from Washington College in 1844 then studied medicine under and worked for Dr. F. Julius Le Moyne, while he attended the Jefferson College of Medicine (later part of Washington and Jefferson College) where he graduated in 1847. That same year he opened his medical practice in Wheeling, West Virginia. He married Caroline Louise Todd, a physician's daughter, on 1 March 1853.

Hupp's interests were wide-ranging and included education and natural science. In 1870 he prepared a memorial to the legislature asking for the appointment of a state geologist, although it took another 27 years before was appointed the first state geologist. He was appointed in 1875 a delegate from the American Medical Association to the European medical associations. He also served as a member of the Executive Committee of the Centennial Medical Commission to the International Medical Congress, which met at Philadelphia in 1876. He was one of the founders of the Medical Society of West Virginia. Hupp served the city and county as a member of the Board of Health, as President of the County Board of Supervisors from 1863 to 1866, and as a member of the Board of Education from 1873 to 1879. For nearly a quarter of a century, from 1862 to 1885, he served the national government as president of the board of United States Examining Surgeons for pensions.

He contributed to many medical journals and other periodicals and has published a "Biographical Sketch of Joseph Thoburn, M. D." (1865); a memorial to the legislature of West Virginia on the appointment of a state geologist (1870); and a memorial to the same body to establish a state board of health (1877).

== Educational reforms ==
Hupp, in 1873, led a successful effort before the board of education to extend a free school education to the African American children of the city. Also in 1873, before the same body, secured the establishment of an evening study in the public schools. In 1877, as chairman of the committee on rules and regulations, was successful in securing the adoption of industrial drawing as a regular study in the schools.
