= Alberto Vilar =

American businessman (1940–2021)

Alberto Vilar, a.k.a. Albert Vilar (October 4, 1940 – September 4, 2021) was an American investment manager who became particularly known as a patron of opera companies, performing arts organizations, and educational institutions. Following the collapse of his investment firm, Amerindo Investment Advisors, he was tried and convicted in November 2008 on charges of money laundering, investment advisor fraud, securities fraud, mail and wire fraud. He was sentenced in February 2010 to nine years in prison and released in 2018.

== Background ==
Originally from West Orange, New Jersey, Vilar earned an economics degree from Washington & Jefferson College, a liberal arts college in Washington, Pennsylvania. He then earned a master's degree in economics at Iona College in New Rochelle, New York. In 1979, along with Gary Tanaka, he founded Amerindo Investment Advisors, an investment advisory firm based in San Francisco and New York, with offices in London. In 1981, Vilar made his first $1 million. Amerindo's main investment activities were in technology funds, which the stock market crash of 2000 severely affected. The value of the Amerindo funds declined sharply, and Vilar began to default on his pledges to arts institutions.

Vilar served on the Washington & Jefferson College Board of Trustees.

== Donations to opera companies and other organizations ==
The arts organisations to which Vilar pledged donations included:

- Royal Opera House, Covent Garden (ROH) in central London, where the Floral Hall, one of the major foyers of the redeveloped house, was named the "Vilar Floral Hall" in recognition of a 1999 pledge of £10 million. The ROH changed the name of its atrium to the Floral Hall in September 2005 after Vilar paid only a fraction of his original £10 million pledge. Subsequently, he pledged money for the "Young Artists Programme", several opera production sponsorships, and for the installation of seat back titles in the main auditorium.
- The Salzburg Festival received its largest donation in its 81-year history from Vilar. He in turn received a full-page color photo of himself in every program book.
- Metropolitan Opera was pledged amounts thought to total $45 million. With $12 million actually given to the company, he remains as its third largest donor.
- The Kirov Opera located in the Mariinsky Theatre in Saint Petersburg, Russia has been another major beneficiary of Vilar's support, which is said to have been around $14 million and was focused primarily on supporting the summer White Nights Festival.
- Washington DC's Kennedy Center, under its President, Michael Kaiser who had developed a relationship with Vilar when the former was at the Royal Opera House, received donations to create an arts-management program, the "Vilar Institute for Arts Management" plus pledges for a program to bring the Kirov Opera to the Center on an annual basis. In 2001 Vilar pledged $50 million toward the Center's activities. Again, actual payments fell short, and the Center has had to seek alternative sources of financial support.
- The Washington National Opera and the Los Angeles Opera both received support from Vilar due to his connection to Plácido Domingo, who was then the General and Artistic Director of both companies. $10 million was pledged to each company.
- The Maazel-Vilar Conductor's Competition.
- New York University has the Alberto Vilar Global Fellows in the Performing Arts program, which began in 2002 with a $23.4 million donation to attract and bring young performing artists to study in New York for two years. It has been described by NYU as a Rhodes Scholars-style program.
- Beaver Creek, Colorado has the Vilar Center for the Arts and the Ford Amphitheater/Vilar Pavilion in Vail, Colorado.
- Washington & Jefferson College began construction of a new technology building, which was to be named "The Vilar Technology Center," based on a multimillion-dollar pledge by Vilar. With the pledge failing to fully materialize, funds were diverted from elsewhere, allowing for the scaled back building, along with its scaled back name of the "Technology Center" to be completed.
- Vilar Distinguished Artist Series at Washington & Jefferson College, featuring Lorin Maazel and Susan Graham

As a result of his philanthropy, in 2002 the Americans for the Arts organization gave him their National Arts Award, for "Corporate Citizenship in the Arts".

As noted in James Stewart's 2006 New Yorker profile of Vilar, at some point in 2002, Vilar was hospitalized for a series of operations on his back, and he claims to have nearly died as the result of complications: "they were ready to give me the last rites". There was speculation that he might have missed some planned donations as the result of his illness.

A lasting effect, however, clearly came from the severe decline in his personal fortune due to the crash in technology stocks around 2000. It is documented that Vilar still continued to make pledges even as his personal and his company's fortunes continued to plunge. Among the pledges were $5 million for money for voice loss research after meeting Julie Andrews and $30 million to a Berlin opera company: "Asking Alberto for money was like offering an alcoholic a drink". However, many of his pledges were never paid.

== Fraud conviction ==
Vilar and Tanaka were arrested on May 26, 2005, on charges of securities fraud. The government claimed that the two appropriated as much as $5 million of Amerindo client Lily Cates's (heiress and mother of actress Phoebe Cates) money for personal use. It was alleged that Vilar used the money to pay for some home repairs and to make good on previously-promised charitable contributions. It was also alleged that Tanaka used money to purchase thoroughbred race horses. The SEC also filed a civil suit.

According to Stewart's article in The New Yorker, an extensive analysis of Vilar's rise and fall, "Vilar maintains that when he was arrested he was on the brink of a financial comeback. Everything I predicted about the Internet has come true.... I'm ready to go back to work and make money." Stewart continues: "if convicted, Vilar and Tanaka face fines of more than ten million dollars and prison terms of up to a hundred and fifty-five years. But Vilar says, 'We'll sort this out. I'll get beyond this. I will always try to help others.... I still love opera and classical music.... The Met is not going to get my money, but it will not kill my love of music.'"

The charges did not allege wrongdoing at Amerindo's mutual funds, and when the firm was wound up there were no missing funds. But Morningstar, a fund analysis company, advised investors to withdraw their money in any case, because the funds had been performing very poorly. In fact, as with many other funds investing in internet companies, investors had already been pulling out for some time, reducing assets and causing expense ratios to increase. Extensive seizures of records and computers in the course of the investigation compelled Amerindo's board to merge the fund with Munder Capital Management's fund, Munder NetNet, later renamed Munder Internet. The seizures were ruled excessive by a federal judge in early 2007.

Vilar and Tanaka's trial began in September 2008, with Herald Price Fahringer as Vilar's defence attorney and Glenn Colton representing Tanaka. The trial concluded on November 19, 2008 with the conviction of Vilar on all 12 counts with which he had been charged and the conviction of Tanaka on 3 counts.

On February 5, 2010, Vilar was sentenced to nine years in prison, while Tanaka was sentenced to five years. They were both featured in the fifth season of the television series American Greed. In October 2012, after having served more than 2 1/2 years at the Fort Dix, New Jersey, Federal Correctional Institution, the appeals court, over the objections of the prosecution, ordered his immediate release pending the appeal. Vilar and Tanaka were returned to jail in November 2013. In April 2014, Vilar was returned to prison, and sentenced to an additional year for preventing the victims' families from recovering their lost funds.

== Consequences of his failures to pay promised donations ==
In a 2000 interview with Philipp Blom, Vilar had estimated his donations to opera houses and other performing arts centers in some 150 million dollars granted over the previous 10 years

Many of the organizations to which Vilar had pledged donations gradually began to remove his name from parts of their institutions where it had been prominently placed.

In July 2005 the Royal Opera House announced that, following Vilar's failure to maintain the agreed payment schedule, his name would be removed from the building. Later his name was removed from the young artists program when a new donor stepped forward.

At the Metropolitan Opera, his name appeared on the "Vilar Grand Tier"; it has since been removed. The Washington Opera's young artists program has also been renamed (after additional support was found) as the "Domingo-Cafritz Young Artist Program", and the Kennedy Center's "Arts Management Fellowship" program has similarly dropped the Vilar name. (That program was subsequently funded by, and named after, Betsy DeVos, Donald Trump’s Secretary of Education, and her husband, Richard, and later moved to the University of Maryland.)

== Sources ==
- Lebrecht, Norman (May 23, 2001). "A New Future for Opera?". The Telegraph.
- Stewart, James B. (February 13, 2006). "The Opera Lover: How Alberto Vilar's Passion for Philanthropy Landed Him in Jail". The New Yorker.
