= Alan Cottrill =

American sculptor

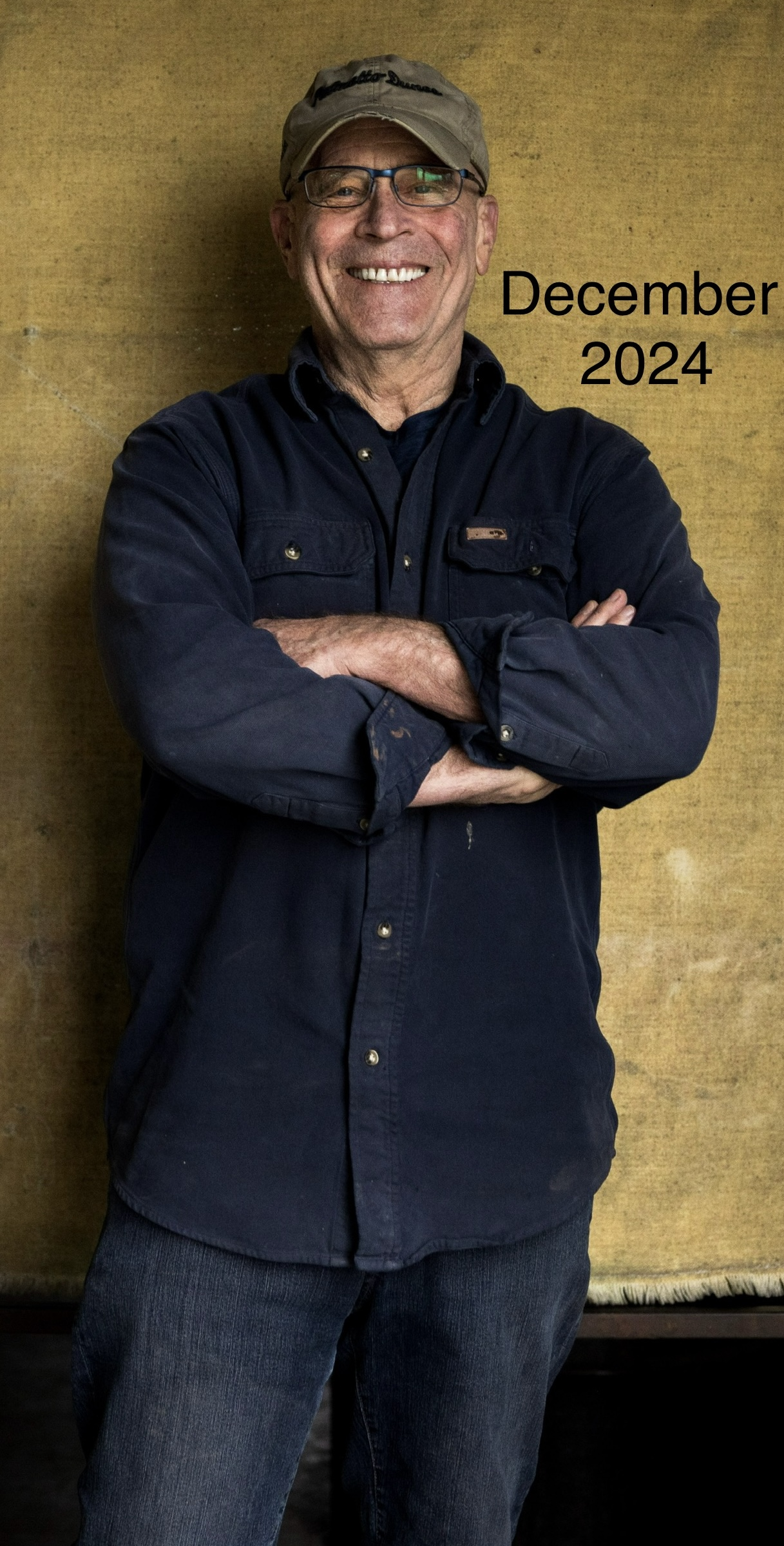
- Born: August 12, 1952 (age 73); Zanesville, Ohio
- Occupation: Figurative sculptor
- Known for: Statue of Thomas Edison in the US Capitol Building, Statuary Hall, Washington, DC
- Spouse(s): Diane Holtzapple (m. 1972; div. 1976); Susan K. Long Cottrill (m. 1976–present)
- Children: 5
- Parent(s): Nelson Frank Cottrill (1933–1993); Mary Jane Henderson (1934–2012)
- Website: www.alancottrill.com

Alan Cottrill is an American sculptor and entrepreneur who created the statue of Thomas Edison, on display in the United States Capitol's National Statuary Hall, and Don Colossus, a 15-foot bronze statue of Donald Trump. He and his wife Susan co-founded the international pizza chain Four Star Pizza.

== Career and studio ==
Cottrill specializes in large-scale bronze figurative works. Over more than 30 years he has created over 500 life-size or larger monuments installed throughout the United States.

In 1990 Cottrill first worked with clay and soon sold his business interests to pursue sculpture full-time. He studied at the Art Students League and National Academy of Design in New York City and took anatomy courses using cadavers at Columbia Medical Center.

== Early life and business career ==
Cottrill was born and raised in Zanesville, Ohio. After brief college attendance, U.S. Army service, and truck driving, he entered the fast-food industry. He met his second wife, Susan, while owning Domino's franchises and together they founded Four Star Pizza, which grew into a successful multi-national chain. Business travel on U.S. government trade missions exposed him to major art museums worldwide, sparking his interest in art collecting and painting.

== Sculpture career ==
In 1990, Cottrill first worked with clay and soon sold his business interests to sculpt full-time. He studied at the Art Students League, National Academy of Design, and anatomy (via cadavers) at Columbia Medical Center in New York City.

Cottrill has created over 500 life-size or larger monuments installed across the United States, including the Thomas Edison statue selected in 2014 for National Statuary Hall (replacing William Allen).

In 2024, Cottrill completed Don Colossus, a 15-foot polished bronze of Donald Trump depicting his raised-fist reaction to the Butler assassination attempt. Commissioned by cryptocurrency supporters for about $400,000, it was intended for display at Trump's second inauguration and a subsequent tour.
