= Arthur Henry Ewing =

American missionary and academic (1864-1912)

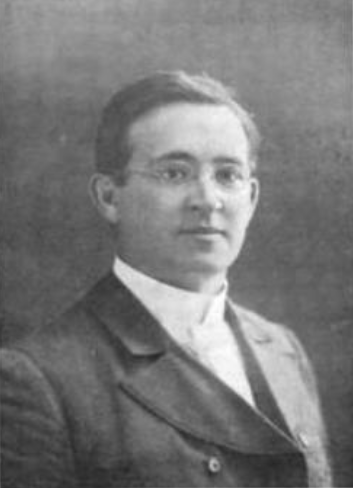
- Born: 18 October 1864; Saltsburg, Pennsylvania, U.S.
- Died: 13 September 1912 (aged 47); Allahabad, British India
- Education: Washington & Jefferson College
- Occupation(s): Missionary, academic
- Relatives: James Caruthers Rhea Ewing (brother)

Arthur Henry Ewing (18 October 1864 – 13 September 1912) was a prominent American Presbyterian missionary and academic.

== Biography ==
Arthur Henry Ewing was born near Saltsburg, Pennsylvania on 18 October 1864. He graduated from Washington & Jefferson College in 1887. In his missionary duties, he served as a principal of a Boys' Boarding School in India and served as Principal of Allahabad Christian College from 1901–1912, which was later renamed Ewing Christian College in his honour. He was the brother of James Caruthers Rhea Ewing, who was also a Presbyterian missionary in India.

Arthur Henry Ewing died in Allahabad on 13 September 1912.

== Published works ==
- Ewing, Arthur Henry (1901). The Hindu Conception of the Functions of Breath: A Study in Early Hindu Psycho-physics. Johns Hopkins University. pp. 60.
