= Joseph Smith (Presbyterian minister, born 1736) =

American minister and educator

- Born: 1736; Cecil County, Maryland
- Died: 1792 (aged 55–56)
- Education: College of New Jersey (now Princeton University)
- Spouse: Esther (Cummins) Smith
- Relatives: Joseph Smith Grandson

Ecclesiastical career
- Church: Presbyterian

Joseph Smith (1736–1792) was a prominent Presbyterian minister in Western Pennsylvania. He is one of the founders of Washington & Jefferson College.

== Biography ==
=== Early life ===
Smith was born in Cecil County, Maryland, not far from the modern location of the Conowingo Dam. He graduated from the College of New Jersey (now Princeton University) in 1764 at the relatively mature age of 28. He was "tall, blond, slender, and had piercing eyes" and was "emotional to a degree we do not usually associate with Englishmen."

=== Career ===
He was first licensed to preach by New Castle Presbytery and accepted a call in Brandywine, Pennsylvania. He and his family moved west to Cross Creek in what is now Washington County, Pennsylvania. There, he built a home and a log school called "The Study," where he taught.

Smith was known as a "firery and eloquent speaker" and held days-long revivals on the high plateau at Upper Buffalo. He loved reading religious materials in the original language: The Old Testament in Hebrew, the New Testament in Greek, Edward Leigh's Critica Sacra, and Pool's Synopsis. It was said that he kept a cloak at the foot of his bed for use when he would spontaneously rise to pray in his bitterly cold room in the middle of the night.
