= Joseph Stockton =

Joseph A. Stockton
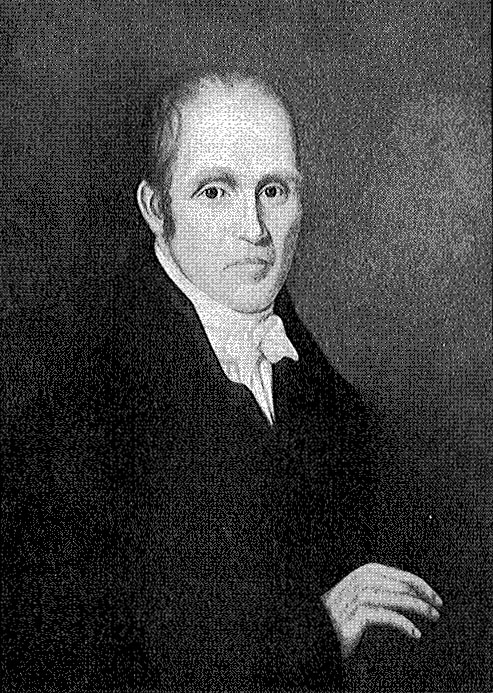
- Born: February 25, 1779; Franklin County, Pennsylvania
- Died: October 29, 1832 (aged 53); Baltimore, Maryland
- Spouse: Esther Clark (m. 1800)

Joseph A. Stockton (1779–1832) was a prominent Presbyterian minister in Western Pennsylvania. He founded Meadville Academy, which later became Allegheny College in Meadville, Pennsylvania. He was also President of University of Pittsburgh.

== Biography ==
Joseph Stockton was born near Chambersburg, Pennsylvania on February 25, 1779.

He attended Jefferson College in Canonsburg, Pennsylvania and was tutored by John McMillan. He was an early member of the Philo Literary Society.

He married Esther Clark on May 8, 1800.

He worked for a time as an assistant tutor at Jefferson College.

He also taught grammar and mathematics at Allegheny Academy in Allegheny, Pennsylvania, now Pittsburgh's North Side, with Mr. Caldwell teaching elocution and John Kelly of Dublin, Ireland as disciplinarian; Kelly later continued the school after Stockton's death. Stockton authored the Western Calculator and Western Spelling Book, used at the academy as textbooks. His most famous student at the academy was Stephen Foster, later America's first professional composer, and Foster's brother Morrison described Stockton as: "a perfect tutor. He was learned, he was firm, he was amiable, and he was thorough and practical."

Stockton died from cholera in Baltimore on October 29, 1832.
