= James Caruthers Rhea Ewing =

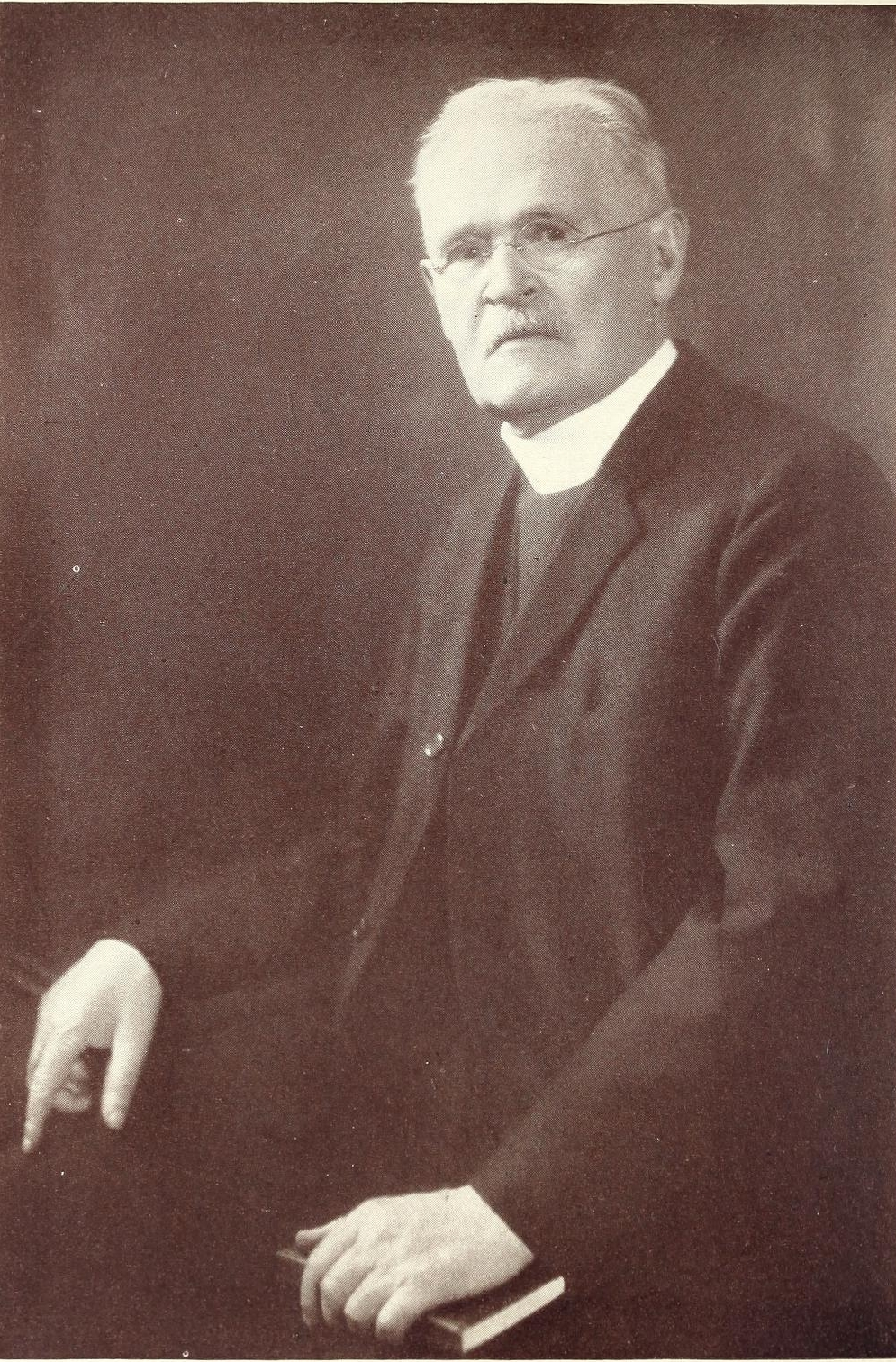

James Caruthers Rhea Ewing, KCIE (23 June 1854 – 20 August 1925) was a prominent American Presbyterian missionary, educationist, theologian, and author who worked in India.

Ewing was born in Armstrong County, Pennsylvania to Eleanor Rhea and James Henry Ewing. Many of the family where clergymen including granduncle Rev. James Ewing Caruthers. The family moved to Saltsburg in 1860. He went to a local school which was called "Clawson's" and then taught at school for a while. He joined Washington & Jefferson College in 1873 and graduated in 1876. He joined the Presbyterian Church of Washington and was a member of the Phi Kappa Psi Fraternity. He then went to the Theological Seminary at Allegheny. He was assigned to the Punjab Mission and sailed on 1879 aboard the steamer Illinois to London and then to India aboard the SS Singapur to Bombay. He spent the first few years learning Urdu and was posted in Allahabad. In 1884 he moved to Saharanpur. In 1887 he received a D.D. from his college. In 1888 he moved to Lahore and served as principal of what became the Forman Christian College in Lahore, Punjab in what is now Pakistan. The college had been called the "Mission College" until the death of Dr Forman in 1894. Ewing stayed on as principal until 1918. For his services after the 1905 earthquake he received a Kaiser-i-Hind Gold medal in 1906. Despite not being a British citizen, his educational work was recognized and he was appointed vice chancellor of Punjab University in 1910 and served several terms until 1917 which including working with non-Christian institutions. He returned to the US in 1922, settling in Princeton. He was created an honorary Knight Commander of the Order of the Indian Empire in 1923, having been made an honorary Commander of the same Order in the 1915 New Year Honours.

Ewing was the brother of Arthur Henry Ewing, who was also a Presbyterian missionary in India. He married Jennie "Jane" Hindman Sherrard on 24 June 1879. The couple had six children, Eleanor Elizabeth (born 1880), Anna Kezia (born 1881), John Sherrard (born 1884), Margaret Rhea (1889-90), Nancy Sherrard (born 1892) and Rhea McCurdy (born 1902).

== Published works ==
- Rhea Ewing, James Caruthers (1918). A Prince of the Church in India. Fleming H. Revell Company. pp. 128.
