= Walter B. Massenburg =

American navy admiral (born 1949)

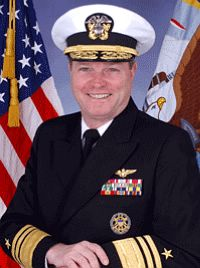
- Formal portrait of Walter B. Massenburg
- Born: February 19, 1949 (age 77); Greenville, South Carolina
- Military career
- Allegiance: United States of America
- Branch: United States Navy
- Service years: 1971–2007
- Rank: Vice Admiral
- Commands: Commanding Officer Patrol Squadron Six (VP-6), Naval Air Systems Command Patuxent River, Maryland
- Awards: Navy Distinguished Service Medal; Legion of Merit with two Gold Stars; Defense Meritorious Service Medal; Meritorious Service Medal; Navy Commendation Medal with two Gold Stars.

Vice Admiral Walter Black Massenburg (born 1949) is a retired American Navy admiral and former commander of the Naval Air Systems Command in Patuxent River, Maryland.

He is a 1970 graduate of Washington and Jefferson College, where he majored in physics.

A native of Baltimore, Massenburg was commissioned in 1970. He completed flight training and received his naval aviator wings in 1971. He received a Master of Science degree in systems management from the University of Southern California in 1978 and a Master of Arts degree in national security and strategic studies from the Naval War College in 1990. Operationally, Massenburg served his initial sea tour with Patrol Squadron 45, then as executive officer of the Naval Facility, Antigua, as operations officer of Patrol Squadron 45 and as executive officer and subsequently commanding officer of Patrol Squadron 6. Ashore, he served in operational test with Air Test and Evaluation Squadron 1, as team leader of the Commander, Patrol Wings Atlantic Tactical Training Team in Patrol Squadron 30 and as a member of the Chief of Naval Operations sponsored Antisubmarine Warfare Continuum in the office of the Deputy Chief of Naval Operations for Manpower, Personnel and Training. He was subsequently assigned to the staff of the Deputy Chief of Naval Operations (Air Warfare) as the antisubmarine warfare aircraft inventory coordinator and, later, served on the staff of the Chairman, Joint Chiefs of Staff, as the branch chief, Tactical Forces Branch in the Force Structure, Resources and Assessment Directorate. Within NAVAIR, Massenburg has served in the Maritime Surveillance Aircraft Program Office as deputy program manager for the P-3 Anti-Surface Warfare Improvement Program and later assumed command of the Maritime Surveillance Aircraft Program Office. After promotion to rear admiral, he assumed leadership and management responsibility as assistant commander for Logistics in 1999 and then as assistant commander for Aviation Depots in 2003. While serving as the assistant commander for logistics, Massenburg helped create the Naval Aviation Readiness Integrated Improvement Program (NAVRIIP) where he acted as chief operating officer for the program. NAVRIIP is a comprehensive program to drive cost-wise readiness initiatives by identifying and reducing actual costs to Naval Aviation.

Massenburg's personal decorations include the Navy Distinguished Service Medal, Legion of Merit with two Gold Stars, the Defense Meritorious Service Medal, the Meritorious Service Medal, the Navy Commendation Medal with two Gold Stars and numerous campaign and service awards.

== Military awards ==

Naval Aviator Badge
Navy Distinguished Service Medal		Legion of Merit w/ 2 award stars
Defense Meritorious Service Medal	Meritorious Service Medal	Navy and Marine Corps Commendation Medal w/ 2 award stars
Joint Meritorious Unit Award	Navy Meritorious Unit Commendation w/ 3 service stars	Coast Guard Meritorious Unit Commendation w/ 1 award star and Operational Distinguishing Device
Battle "E"	Navy Expeditionary Medal	National Defense Service Medal w/ 2 service stars
Global War on Terrorism Service Medal	Sea Service Deployment Ribbon w/ 3 service stars	Navy & Marine Corps Overseas Service Ribbon w/ 1 service star
Joint Chiefs of Staff Identification Badge
