= Sprigge =

Sprigge is a surname. Notable people with the surname include:

- A. B. S. Sprigge (1906–1980), English sculptor
- Elizabeth Sprigge (1900–1979), English novelist and biographer
- Joshua Sprigg or Joshua Sprigge (1618–1684), English theologian and preacher
- Samuel Squire Sprigge (1860–1937), English physician and medical editor
- Sylvia Sprigge (1903–1966), British journalist and author
- Timothy Sprigge (1932–2007), British philosopher
- William Sprigge (1678–1735), Irish politician

== See also ==
- Sprigg (disambiguation)
- Spriggs
