= Sprigg =

Sprigg may refer to:

== People ==
- James Cresap Sprigg (1802–1852), American politician
- John Gordon Sprigg (1830–1913), Prime Minister of the Cape Colony
- Joshua Sprigg (1618–1684), English Independent theologian and preacher
- Michael Sprigg (1791–1845), American politician; brother of James Cresap Sprigg
- Reg Sprigg (1919–1994), Australian geologist
- Richard Sprigg, Jr. (c. 1769–1806), American politician
- Richard Keith Sprigg (1922–2011), British linguist
- Samuel Sprigg (1783–1855), American politician
- Thomas Sprigg (1747–1809), American politician
- William Sprigg Hall (1832–1875), American lawyer and politician

== Other uses ==
- Sprigg Township, Adams County, Ohio, United States
- Sprigg, a fictional character in the PlayStation game Chrono Cross

== See also ==
- Sprick
- Sprigge
- Spriggs
