= Spirk =

Spirk is a German surname meaning "sparrow" in Alemannic dialect, most commonly from the nickname referring to a small or nimble person. Notable people with the surname include:

- Ernst Spirk, manufacturer of Steirische Harmonika and harmonika player
- Josef Spirk (born 1946), Austrian composer and conductor
- Ralph Spirk, Austrian footballer

== See also ==
- Sprick
