= Elizabeth Sprigge =

English novelist, biographer, translator and children's writer

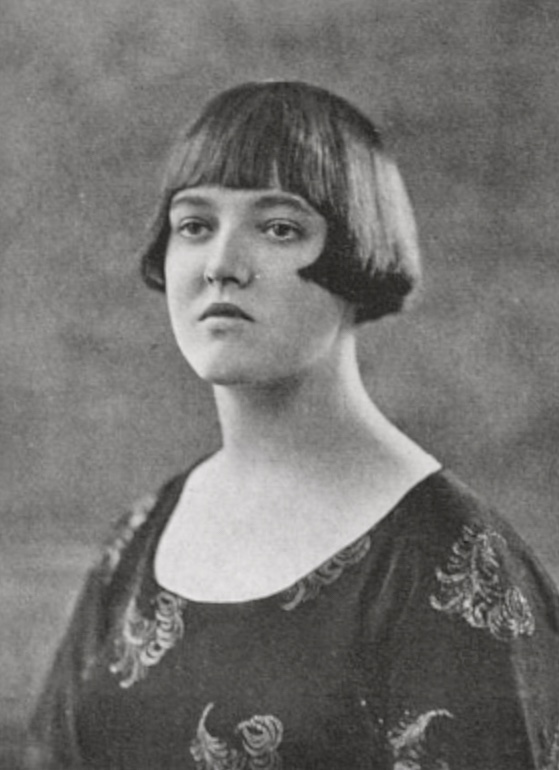

Elizabeth Miriam Squire Sprigge (10 June 1900, in Kensington – 9 December 1974) was an English novelist, biographer, translator, and children's writer.

== Biography ==
Elizabeth Sprigge was the elder daughter of Sir Samuel Squire Sprigge, editor of The Lancet. On 23 July 1921 she married Mark Napier-Clavering (1898–1983), a business agent employed by Debenhams, who on 27 May 1924 dropped 'Clavering' from his name by deed poll, it having been adopted by his grandfather, Rev. John Warren Napier. He was a descendant of Francis Napier, 8th Lord Napier. They were divorced in 1945, having had two daughters: Julyan Napier (1922–2005) and Ruth Napier (1923–1996).

From her late twenties until the end of her life, Elizabeth Sprigge published steadily. She might be best remembered for her 1973 biography of her long-time friend Ivy Compton-Burnett. According to Joyce Carol Oates, Hilary Spurling's "exhaustively researched" Life of I. Compton-Burnett (Knopf, 1984) ".. seems to follow the general outline set by Elizabeth Sprigge's memoir-biography... while greatly expanding upon it" Likewise, J. Bhagyalakshmi, in 'Ivy Compton-Burnett and her Art (1986) reflects that as opposed to Sprigge- who produced 'a friend's memoir'- Spurling took 'pains of a scholar' in compiling her biography; whereas Sprigge uncritically recounts the family tradition of kinship with landowning Scottish Burnetts and descent from them through Alexander Burnett, 12th Laird of Leys, his son, judge Robert Burnet, Lord Crimond, and his grandson Gilbert Burnet, Bishop of Salisbury from 1689 to 1715, Spurling, acknowledging the 'many misleading claims... made for I. Compton-Burnett's family tree'), meticulously traces the family back to the small tenant farmers from whom they actually descended. Additionally, Compton-Burnett's father, James, was claimed to be son of 'a considerable landowner' at Redlynch, near Salisbury, the place of James's birth (despite James always plainly referring to his father Charles as 'a farmer'); Charles was in fact an itinerant farm labourer- including at Redlynch- who later settled at French Street, in a poor area of Southampton; the other Compton-Burnetts of Charles's generation were labourers and grocers).

== Selected publications ==
=== Novels ===
- A Shadowy Third. 1927.
- Faint Amorist. 1927.
- Home is the Hunter. 1930.
- The Old Man Dies. 1933.
- Castle in Andalusia. 1935.
- The Son of the House. 1937.
- The Raven's Wing. 1940.

=== Children's books ===
- Children Alone. 1935.
- Pony Tracks. 1936.
- Two Lost on Dartmoor. 1940.
- The Dolphin Bottle. 1965.

=== Biographies ===
- The Strange Life of August Strindberg. 1949.
- Gertrude Stein: Her Life and Work. 1957.
- Jean Cocteau: The Man and the Mirror. 1968.
- Sybil Thorndike Casson. 1971.
- The Life of Ivy Compton-Burnett. 1973.

=== Translations ===
- Six Plays of August Strindberg: In New Translations. 1955.
