= Benedetto Croce =

Italian philosopher (1866–1952)

Benedetto Croce OCI COSML
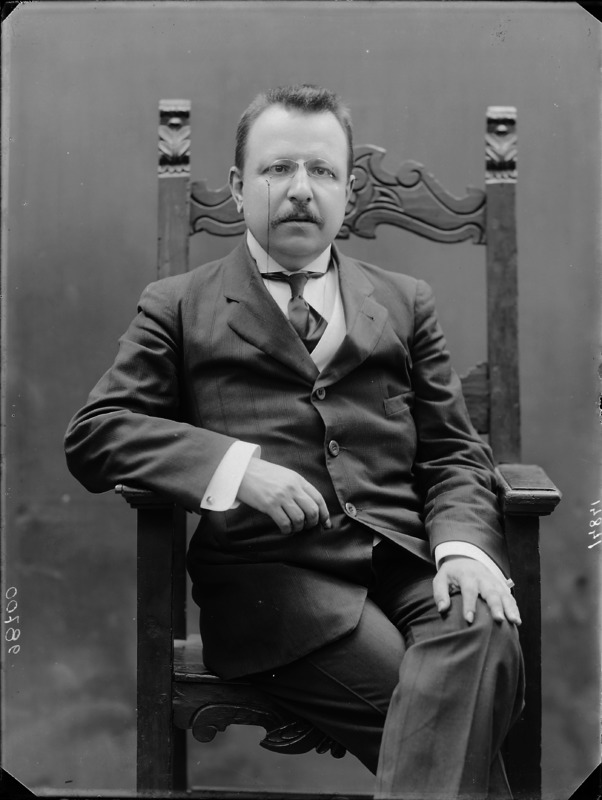
- Croce in 1909

Member of the Senate of the Republic
- In office 8 May 1948 – 20 November 1952
- Constituency: Naples

Member of the Constituent Assembly
- In office 25 June 1946 – 31 January 1948
- Constituency: Italy at-large

Minister of Public Education
- In office 15 June 1920 – 4 July 1921
- Prime Minister: Giovanni Giolitti
- Preceded by: Andrea Torre
- Succeeded by: Orso Mario Corbino

Member of the Senate of the Kingdom
- In office 26 January 1910 – 24 June 1946
- Appointed by: Victor Emmanuel III

Personal details
- Born: 25 February 1866 Pescasseroli, Italy
- Died: 20 November 1952 (aged 86) Naples, Italy
- Party: Italian Liberal Party (1922–1952)
- Spouse: Adele Rossi (m. 1914)
- Domestic partner: Angelina Zampanelli (1893–1913; her death)
- Children: 5, including Elena
- Relatives: Silvio Spaventa (uncle)
- Education: University of Naples
- Profession: Historian; writer; landowner
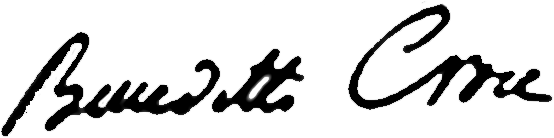
- Signature

Education
- Academic advisor: Antonio Labriola

Philosophical work
- Era: 20th-century philosophy
- Region: Western philosophy; Italian philosophy
- School: Italian idealism Neo-Hegelianism; Classical liberalism Historism (storicismo)
- Institutions: Istituto Italiano per gli Studi Storici
- Main interests: History; aesthetics; politics
- Notable ideas: Liberism; Aesthetic expressivism

Benedetto Croce (/ˈkroʊtʃeɪ/ KROH-chay; Italian: [beneˈdetto ˈkroːtʃe]; 25 February 1866 – 20 November 1952) was an Italian idealist philosopher, historian, and politician who wrote on numerous topics, including philosophy, history, historiography, and aesthetics. A political liberal in most regards, he formulated a distinction between liberalism (as support for civil liberties) and "liberism" (as support for laissez-faire economics and capitalism). Croce had considerable influence on other Italian intellectuals, from Marxists to Italian fascists, such as Antonio Gramsci and Giovanni Gentile, respectively.

He had a long career in the Italian Parliament, joining the Senate of the Kingdom of Italy in 1910, serving through Fascism and the Second World War before being elected to the Constituent Assembly as a Liberal. In the 1948 general election he was elected to the new republican Senate and served there until his death. He was a longtime member of the Italian Liberal Party, serving as its president from 1944 to 1947.

Croce was the president of the worldwide writers' association PEN International from 1949 until 1952. He was nominated for the Nobel Prize in Literature 16 times. He is also noted for his "major contributions to the rebirth of Italian democracy". He was an elected International Member of both the American Academy of Arts and Sciences and the American Philosophical Society.

== Biography ==
Croce was born in Pescasseroli in the Abruzzo region of Italy. His family was influential and wealthy, and he was raised in a very strict Roman Catholic environment. Around the age of 16, he quit Catholicism and developed a personal philosophy of spiritual life, in which religion cannot be anything but a historical institution where the creative strength of mankind can be expressed. He kept this philosophy for the rest of his life.

In 1883, an earthquake occurred in the village of Casamicciola on the island of Ischia near Naples, where he was on holiday with his family, destroying the home they lived in. His mother, father, and only sister were all killed, and he was buried for a long time and barely survived. After the earthquake, he inherited his family's fortune and—much like Schopenhauer—was able to live the rest of his life in relative leisure, devoting a great deal of time to philosophy as an independent intellectual writing from his palazzo in Naples.

He studied law, but never graduated, at the University of Naples, while reading extensively on historical materialism. His ideas were publicized at the University of Rome towards the end of the 1890s by Professor Antonio Labriola. Croce was well acquainted with and sympathetic to the developments in European socialist philosophy exemplified by August Bebel, Friedrich Engels, Karl Kautsky, Paul Lafargue, Wilhelm Liebknecht, and Filippo Turati.

Influenced by Neapolitan-born Gianbattista Vico's thoughts about art and history, he began studying philosophy in 1893. Croce also purchased the house in which Vico had lived. His friend, the philosopher Giovanni Gentile, encouraged him to read Hegel. Croce's famous commentary on Hegel, What is Living and What is Dead of the Philosophy of Hegel, was published in 1907.

=== Political involvement ===
As his fame increased, Croce was persuaded, against his initial wishes, to become involved in politics. In 1910, he was appointed to the Italian Senate, a lifelong position. He was an open critic of Italy's participation in World War I, feeling that it was a suicidal trade war. Although this made him initially unpopular, his reputation was restored after the war. In 1919, he supported the government of Francesco Saverio Nitti while also expressing his admiration for the nascent Weimar Republic and the Social Democratic Party of Germany. He was Minister of Public Education between 1920 and 1921 for the 5th and last government headed by Giovanni Giolitti. Benito Mussolini assumed power slightly more than a year after Croce's exit from the government; Mussolini's first Minister of Public Education was Giovanni Gentile, an independent who later became a fascist and with whom Croce had earlier cooperated in a philosophical polemic against positivism. Gentile remained minister for only a year but managed to begin a comprehensive reform of Italian education that was based partly on Croce's earlier suggestions. Gentile's reform remained in force well beyond the Fascist regime and was only partly abolished in 1962.

Croce was instrumental in the relocation of the Biblioteca Nazionale Vittorio Emanuele III to the Royal Palace of Naples in 1923.

=== Relations with Italian fascism ===
Croce initially supported Mussolini's Italian fascism government that took power in 1922. The assassination by the National Fascist Party and Blackshirts of the socialist politician Giacomo Matteotti in June 1924 shook Croce's support for Mussolini. In May 1925, Croce was one of the signatories to the Manifesto of the Anti-Fascist Intellectuals, which had been written by Croce himself; however, in June 1924, he had voted in the Senate in support of the Mussolini government. He later explained that he had hoped that the support for Mussolini in parliament would weaken the more extreme Fascists who, he believed, were responsible for Matteotti's murder. Croce later became one of the firmest opponents of fascism.

In 1928, Croce voted against the law which effectively abolished free elections in Italy by requiring electors to vote for a list of candidates approved by the Grand Council of Fascism. He became increasingly dismayed by the number of ex-democrats who had abandoned their former principles. Croce frequently provided financial assistance to anti-fascist writers and dissidents, such as Giorgio Amendola, Ivanoe Bonomi, and Meuccio Ruini, as well as those who wanted to maintain intellectual and political independence from the regime, and covertly helped them get published. Croce's house in Turin became a popular destination for anti-fascists. After the war, Amendola, along with communists like Eugenio Reale, reflected that Croce offered aid and encouragement to both liberal and Marxist resistance members during the crucial years.

Croce was seriously threatened by Mussolini's regime, and suffered the only act of physical violence at the hands of the fascists in November 1926, when fascists ransacked his home and library in Naples. Although he managed to stay outside prison thanks to his reputation, he remained subject to surveillance, and his academic work was kept in obscurity by the government, to the extent that no mainstream newspaper or academic publication ever referred to him. Croce later coined the term onagrocrazia (literally "government by asses") to emphasize the anti-intellectual and boorish tendencies of parts of the Fascist regime. However, in describing Fascism as anti-intellectual, Croce ignored the many Italian intellectuals who at the time actively supported Mussolini's regime, including Croce's former friend and colleague, Gentile. Croce also described Fascism as malattia morale (literally "moral illness"). When Mussolini's government adopted antisemitic policies in 1938, Croce was the only non-Jewish intellectual who refused to complete a government questionnaire designed to collect information on the so-called "racial background" of Italian intellectuals. Besides writing in his periodical, Croce used other means to express his anti-racism and to make public statements against the persecution of the Jews.

=== Brief government stints and constitutional referendum ===
In 1944, when democracy was restored in Southern Italy, Croce, as an "icon of liberal anti-fascism", became minister without portfolio in governments headed by Pietro Badoglio for about a month and again for a month by Ivanoe Bonomi. He left the government in July 1944 but remained president of the Liberal Party until 1947.

Croce voted for the Monarchy in the 1946 Italian constitutional referendum, after having persuaded his Liberal Party to adopt a neutral stance. He was elected to the Constituent Assembly, which existed in Italy between June 1946 and January 1948. He spoke in the Assembly against the Peace treaty (signed in February 1947), which he regarded as humiliating for Italy. He declined to stand as the provisional President of Italy.

=== Philosophical works ===
Croce's most interesting philosophical ideas are expounded in three works: Aesthetic (1902), Logic (1908), and Philosophy of the Practical (1908), but his complete work is spread over 80 books and 40 years worth of publications in his own bi-monthly literary magazine, La Critica. Croce was philosophically a pantheist, but, from a religious point of view, an agnostic; however, he published an essay entitled "Why We Cannot Help Calling Ourselves Christians". This essay shows the Christian roots of European culture, but religion is considered by Croce a mere propaedeutic study for philosophy, which is the only true science: philosophy is, in fact, the science of spirit (the "Philosophy of Spirit").

== Philosophy of spirit ==
Heavily influenced by Hegel and other German Idealists such as Schelling, Croce produced what was called, by him, the Philosophy of Spirit. His preferred designations were "absolute idealism" or "absolute historicism". Croce's work can be seen as a second attempt (contra Kant) to resolve the problems and conflicts between empiricism and rationalism (or sensationalism and transcendentalism, respectively). He calls his way immanentism, and concentrates on the lived human experience, as it happens in specific places and times. Since the root of reality is this immanent existence in concrete experience, Croce places aesthetics at the foundation of his philosophy.

=== Domains of mind ===
Croce's methodological approach to philosophy is expressed in his divisions of the spirit, or mind. He divides mental activity first into the theoretical and then the practical. The theoretical division splits between aesthetics and logic. This theoretical aesthetic includes, most importantly, intuitions and history. The logic includes concepts and relations. Practical spirit is concerned with economics and ethics. Economics is here to be understood as an exhaustive term for all utilitarian matters.

Each of these divisions has an underlying structure that colours, or dictates, the sort of thinking that goes on within them. While aesthetics are driven by beauty, logic is subject to truth, economics is concerned with what is useful, and the moral, or ethics, is bound to the good. This schema is descriptive in that it attempts to elucidate the logic of human thought; however, it is prescriptive as well, in that these ideas form the basis for epistemological claims and confidence.

== History ==
Croce also had great esteem for Vico and shared his opinion that history should be written by philosophers. Croce's On History sets forth the view of history as "philosophy in motion", that there is no "cosmic design" or ultimate plan in history, and that the "science of history" was a farce.

== Aesthetics ==
Croce's work Breviario di estetica (The Essence of Aesthetics) appears in the form of four lessons (quattro lezioni) in aesthetics that he was asked to write and deliver at the inauguration of Rice University in 1912. He declined an invitation to attend the event, but he wrote the lessons and submitted them for translation so that they could be read in his absence.

In this brief but dense work, Croce sets forth his theory of art. He believed that art is more important than science or metaphysics since only art edifies us. He claimed that all we know can be reduced to imaginative knowledge. Art springs from the latter, making it, at its heart, pure imagery. All thought is based in part on this, and it precedes all other thought. The task of an artist is then to invent the perfect image that they can produce for their viewer, since this is what beauty fundamentally is – the formation of inward, mental images in their ideal state. Our intuition is the basis for forming these concepts within us.

Croce was the first to develop a position later known as aesthetic expressivism, the idea that art expresses emotions, not ideas. (R. G. Collingwood later developed a similar thesis.)

Croce's theory was later debated by such contemporary Italian philosophers as Umberto Eco, who locates the aesthetic within a semiotic construction.

== Contributions to liberal political theory ==
Croce's liberalism differs from the theories advocated by most proponents of liberal political thought, including those in Britain and the United States. While Croce theorises that the individual is the basis of society, he rejects social atomism. While Croce accepts limited government, he disputes the idea that the government should have fixed legitimate powers. Croce did not agree with John Locke about the nature of liberty. Croce believed that liberty is not a natural right but an earned right that arises out of the continuing historical struggle for its maintenance. Croce defined civilisation as the "continual vigilance" against barbarism, and liberty conformed to his ideal for civilisation as it allows one to experience the full potential of life. Croce also rejects egalitarianism as absurd. In short, his variety of liberalism is aristocratic, as he views society as being led by the few who can create the goodness of truth, civilisation, and beauty, with the great mass of citizens, simply benefiting from them but unable to fully comprehend their creations.

In Etica e politica (1931), Croce defines liberalism as an ethical conception of life that rejects dogmatism and favours diversity, and in the name of liberty and free choice of the individual, is hostile to the authoritarianism of fascism, communism, and the Catholic Church. While Croce realizes that democracy can sometimes threaten individual liberty, he sees liberalism and democracy as predicated on the same ideals of moral equality and opposition to authority. Furthermore, he acknowledged the positive historical role played by the Socialist parties in Italy in their struggles to improve conditions for the working class, and urged modern socialists to swear off dictatorial solutions. In contrast to the socialists, whom Croce viewed as part of modernity along with liberals, his condemnation of reactionaries is unremittingly harsh.

Croce draws a distinction between liberalism and capitalism or laissez-faire economic doctrines. For Croce, capitalism only emerged to meet certain economic needs of society, and could be changed or even replaced if better solutions to those needs were found, if it failed to promote freedom, or if economic values clashed with higher values. Thus, liberalism could welcome socialist proposals so long as they promoted freedom. Croce's ideas on the separation between liberalism as an ethical principle and the contingent laissez-faire economic doctrines which accompanied it in certain contexts would influence Italian social democrats such as Leo Valiani and Giuseppe Saragat as well as the liberal socialist synthesis of Carlo Rosselli.

== Principal works ==
- Materialismo storico ed economia marxistica (1900), translated into English by C.M. Meredith as Historical Materialism and the Economics of Karl Marx (1914); full text of revised 4th Italian edition (1921), final Italian edition revised by author 1951
- L'Estetica come scienza dell'espressione e linguistica generale (1902), translated into English by Douglas Ainslie as Aesthetic as Science of Expression and General Linguistic (2nd edition, based on revised 5th Italian edition), new translation by Colin Lyas as The Aesthetic as the Science of Expression and of the Linguistic in General (1992); full text of revised 3rd Italian edition (1908), final Italian edition revised by author 1950
- Filosofia della pratica, economica ed etica (1909), translated into English by Douglas Ainslie as Philosophy of the Practical Economic and Ethic (1913); full text of revised 3rd Italian edition (1923), final Italian edition revised by author 1950
- Logica come scienza del concetto puro (1905), translated as Logic as the Science of the Pure Concept (1917, based on revised 3rd Italian edition); full text of revised 4th Italian edition (1920), final edition revised by author 1947
- La filosofia di Giambattista Vico (1911)
- Filosofia dello spirito (1912)
- La rivoluzione napoletana del 1799. Biografie, racconti, ricerche (revised 3rd edition, 1912); final edition revised by author 1948
- Breviario di estetica (1913)
- What is Living and What is Dead of the Philosophy of Hegel (Saggio sullo Hegel), translated by Douglas Ainslie (1915)
- Contributo alla critica di me stesso (1918); revised edition 1945
- Storie e leggende napoletane (1919)
- Teoria e storia della storiografia (1920), translated into English by Douglas Ainslie as Theory and History of Historiography (1921)
- Racconto degli racconti (first translation into Italian from Neapolitan of Giambattista Basile's Pentamerone, Lo cunto de li cunti, 1925)
- "Manifesto of the Anti-Fascist Intellectuals" (in La Critica, 1 May 1925)
- Storia del regno di Napoli (1925), translated into English by Frances Frenaye as History of the Kingdom of Naples (1970, based on the revised 3rd edition of 1953)
- History of Europe in the Nineteenth Century (1933)
- Ultimi saggi (1935)
- La poesia (1936)
- La storia come pensiero e come azione; 1938), translated into English by Sylvia Sprigge as History as the Story of Liberty (1941) in London Also translated and republished as Ryn, Claes G., ed. (2000). History as the story of liberty. Translated by Leander, Folke; et al. Liberty Fund. ISBN 978-0-86597-268-1.
- Il carattere della filosofia moderna (1941)
- Perché non possiamo non dirci "cristiani" (1942)
- Politics and Morals (1945). Croce's dynamic conception of liberty, liberalism and the relation of individual morality to the State.
- Filosofia e storiografia (1949)

== See also ==
- Contributions to liberal theory
- Francesco Ruffini

Non-profit organization positions
Preceded by Maurice Maeterlinck	International President of PEN International; 1949–1952	Succeeded by Charles Langbridge Morgan
