= Sons and Daughters =

Sons and Daughters may refer to:

== Television ==
- Sons and Daughters (Australian TV series), a 1982–87 soap opera
- Sons & Daughters (2006 TV series), a U.S. sitcom
- Sons and Daughters (1974 TV series), a U.S. drama series starring Gary Frank and Glynnis O'Connor
- Sons and Daughters (1991 TV series), a U.S. series starring Lucie Arnaz
- "Sons and Daughters" (Doctors), a 2001 television episode
- "Sons and Daughters" (For All Mankind), a 2026 television episode
- "Sons and Daughters" (Star Trek: Deep Space Nine), a 1997 television episode

== Other uses ==
- Sons and Daughters (1971 film), a Taiwanese film directed by Yueh Feng
- Sons and Daughters (film), a 2001 Argentine film directed by Marco Bechis
- Sons and Daughters (band), a Scottish rock band
- "Sons & Daughters", a song by The Decemberists from The Crane Wife
- Sons & Daughters (restaurant), a San Francisco restaurant
- Sons and Daughters, a novel by Chaim Grade published between 1965 and 1971

== See also ==
- "Son and Daughter", a 1973 song by Queen
- Daughters and Sons, a 1937 novel by Ivy Compton-Burnett
