= Egbert Coleby Morland =

- Born: 3 September 1874; Croydon, England
- Died: 26 April 1955 (aged 80); York, England
- Occupations: Physician and medical editor
- Known for: editorship of The Lancet from 1937 to 1944
- Spouse: Mary Latchmore (m. 1903)

Egbert Coleby Morland FRCS FRCP (1874–1955) was an English physician and medical editor.

Egbert Morland came of Quaker stock. He was the fifth son of Charles Coleby Morland, J.P., and his wife, Jane Fryer. After education at Whitgift School in Croydon and then at Bootham School in York, Egbert Morland studied at Owens College, Manchester, where he graduated BSc in 1893. By means of a scholarship, he studied medicine at St Bartholomew's Hospital, where he qualified in 1897 MRCS and graduated in 1898 MB with the gold medal in physiology. He held appointments as house physician to St Bartholomew's Hospital and to the Great Ormond Street Hospital, but he developed pulmonary tuberculosis with haemoptysis. He had to abandon his house appointments and seek treatment in Switzerland. His fiancée Mary Latchmore insisted on marrying him (in 1903) and nursed him back to better health.

Morland decided to stay in Switzerland and to specialise in the treatment of tuberculosis. After education at the Protestant boarding school in Schiers, he studied medicine at Berne under Kocher and Sahli. Morland received the MD (Berne) with thesis Über die klinische Bedeutung der Opsonine in 1907 and, more importantly for his career, the Federal Diploma allowing him to practise medicine in Switzerland.

He practised as a pulmonary specialist in Switzerland for eleven years (1903–1914) first at Davos and then in Arosa, as director of the Villa Gentiana, a sanatorium for English-speaking patients. At Arosa he was a pioneer of the English colony and helped to build the Anglophone church. During the first year of WWI he served in France as part of a relief unit under the Friends War Victims Relief Committee (FWVRC), but in 1915 went to London and joined the editorial staff of The Lancet.

But before leaving Arosa he had sent an article to The Lancet on the food supply of the German people (1915, 1, 389–99), and this was the beginning of an association with the journal that lasted twenty-nine years, the last seven as editor. To his work as a journalist Morland brought the qualities of a scientist, an artist, and a linguist with an expert knowledge of French and German.

Morland also edited Maternity and Child Welfare: A Monthly Journal for Workers among Mothers and Children from 1917 to 1934. As editor-in-chief of The Lancet from 1937 to 1944, he was preceded by Sir Samuel Squire Sprigge and succeeded by Theodore F. Fox. Morland was elected in 1930 FRCS and in 1941 FRCP.

During the second world war he evacuated The Lancet’s office to Aylesbury and lived "over the shop" from 1939 to 1945. He then retired to Holmfirth, Yorkshire where his wife died in 1948.

Morland and his wife, both Quakers, adopted two sons and a daughter. Egbert Morland came from a Quaker family and had four older brothers. One of his older brothers was Harold Morland, an accountant and auditor, who was Clerk of the Society of Friends from 1927 to 1932.
