= A House and Its Head =

1935 novel by Ivy Compton-Burnett

- First edition
- Author: Ivy Compton-Burnett
- Language: English
- Genre: Novel
- Publisher: W. Heinemann Ltd
- Publication date: 1935
- Publication place: United Kingdom
- Media type: Print (Hardcover)
- Pages: 287 pp

A House and Its Head is a 1935 novel by Ivy Compton-Burnett, republished in 2001 by New York Review Books with an afterword by Francine Prose and in 2021 by Pushkin Press with an introduction by Hilary Mantel. The novel, which focuses on an upper-middle class Victorian household in the 1880s, explores themes such as family secrets and the subordination of women by men. When asked in 1962 which of her novels were her favourites, Compton-Burnett referred to Manservant and Maidservant and "the first two-thirds" of A House and Its Head.

== Plot ==
A House and Its Head introduces a Victorian family: patriarch Duncan Edgeworth, his wife Ellen, his daughters Nance and Sibyl, and his nephew Grant, who is in line to inherit their house. Duncan is tyrannical and overbearing; early on, he throws a science book by Grant, which he finds "immoral," into a fire.

Ellen falls ill and dies, after which Duncan quickly remarries. His new wife, Alison, is beautiful but young—scarcely older than his children. The marriage proves disastrous. Alison begins an affair with Grant, and they conceive a child, Richard. She tries to keep Richard's parentage a secret, but Duncan learns the child is not his from a letter from the family's former nurse, mentioning a white streak in Richard's hair. Alison elopes with family friend Almeric Bode, while Duncan marries the family governess Cassie, who agrees for financial reasons. They have a son, William.

Grant proposes to Nance, who turns him down, and then Sibyl, who accepts. Sibyl, angry that Richard is now in line to inherit Grant's property, pays the nurse to kill Richard by gassing him; she then spreads rumors insinuating that Duncan and/or Cassie may have been responsible. The murder is uncovered by Mrs. Jekyll, Cassie's mother, when she sees an incriminating letter in Sibyl's purse; the letter also reveals that Sibyl paid the nurse to write the letter to Duncan.

Grant leaves Sibyl, who moves in with her ill aunt. Sibyl inherits her aunt's fortune once she dies and asks Grant to forgive her, promising to share it with him. Grant reluctantly accepts.

== Characters ==
The cast of characters introduced in the opening chapters:

- Duncan Edgeworth, 66, head of the Edgeworth family
- Ellen Edgeworth, 60, Duncan's wife
- Nance Edgeworth, 24, their elder daughter
- Sibyl Edgeworth, 18, their younger daughter
- Grant Edgeworth, 25, Duncan's fraternal nephew
- Bethia, middle-aged, the Edgeworth's maid
- Cassandra (Cassie) Jekyll, 39, governess to Nance and Sibyl
- Oscar Jekyll, 38, village rector and Cassie's brother
- Gretchen Jekyll, in her 70s, Cassie and Oscar's mother
- Dulcia Bode, 24, friend of Nance and Sibyl
- Almeric Bode, 26, Dulcia's older brother
- Fabian Smollett, 55, village doctor
- Florence Smollett, 55, Fabian's wife and cousin
- Rosamund Burtenshaw, 44
- Alexander Burtenshaw, Rosamund's father
- Beatrice Fellowes, 38, Rosamund's cousin

== Critical reception ==
Several contemporary writers and critics have praised A House and Its Head. Rebecca Abrams, writing in the New Statesman, ranked it among the publication's most important novels of the 20th century, comparing it to the work of Henry James. Hilary Mantel, writing in The Telegraph, called the book "the merriest tale of human depravity you will ever read." Prose, in her afterword, likened the novel's conclusion to "Jane Austen on bad drugs."
