= Theodore Fortescue Fox =

British physician and medical editor

Sir Theodore Fortescue Fox
- Born: 26 November 1899; Strathpeffer Spa, Strathpeffer, Ross-shire, Scotland
- Died: 19 June 1989 (aged 89); Rotherfield, East Sussex, England
- Occupations: Physician and medical editor
- Known for: editorship of The Lancet from 1944 to 1964

Sir Theodore "Robbie" Fortescue Fox FRCP (26 November 1899 – 19 June 1989) was a British physician and medical editor.

After graduating from Leighton Park School in 1918, Theodore Fox, as a Quaker, joined the Friends' Ambulance Unit and served in France for eight months. With the benefit of a scholarship, he matriculated, in 1919, at Pembroke College, Cambridge. After education at the University Cambridge and medical training at the London Hospital, he qualified MRCS, LRCS (i.e. Member of the RCS, Licentiate of the RCS) in 1924.

At the London Hospital he was house physician to Sir Robert Hutchison. After a round trip to India as a ship's surgeon, Fox undertook, in 1925, locum work at the editorial office of The Lancet. He graduated in 1926 BChir, in 1937 MB, and in 1938 MD from the University of Cambridge.

Fox continued his editorial work at The Lancet until the start of WWII. He served for three years in the RAMC. During WWII he was a regimental medical officer in France before he was evacuated from Cherbourg. He then worked in the RAMC's Army Blood Transfusion Service before he joined the War Office to edit the Army Medical Department Bulletin. At the request of The Lancet’s editor-in-chief Egbert Morland, the RAMC released Fox to return to editorial work at The Lancet’s wartime office in Aylesbury. In 1944, Morland retired and Fox became The Lancet’s editor-in-chief. Fox was elected FRCP in 1946. He was heavily involved in the discussions and controversies concerning the establishment of the National Health Service.

Fox had a talent for grasping the essential achievements and failures of health care in other lands. Short visits to the Soviet Union (1954), China (1957), the United States (1960) and Australia and New Zealand (1963) were cues for penetrating articles on what had been achieved and what was lacking in the health systems of these countries. Despite the mass of fact and observation with which he had to grapple, he made these commentaries illuminating and entertaining.

Fox was, in 1951, the Croonian Lecturer. He gave in 1963 the Heath Clark lectures, which were published as Crisis in Communication (London, The Athlone Press, 1965). In 1965, he delivered the Harveian Oration on Purposes of Medicine. In 1966 he gave the Maurice Bloch lecture at the University of Glasgow.

He was a prolific letter writer and sent his famous hand-painted Christmas cards (Fox cards) to his friends. He was knighted in 1962.

In 1930 he married Margaret Evelyn McDougall (1906–1970). They had four sons. Robin Fox, their youngest son, was editor of The Lancet from 1990 to 1995. T. Fortescue Fox's father was Robert Fortescue Fox, MD, FRCP, a pioneer of physical therapy.

== Selected publications ==
- Fox, T. Fortescue (January 1955). "The medical corridor". Irish Journal of Medical Science. 30 (1): 15–17. doi:10.1007/BF02949408. PMID 13232795. S2CID 9361647.
- Fox, T. F. (June 1960). "Medical care in China today". American Journal of Public Health. 50 (6_pt_2): 28–35. doi:10.2105/AJPH.50.6_Pt_2.28. PMC 1373286. PMID 13824266.
- Fox, T. F. (September 1960). "The Ethics of Clinical Trials". Medico-Legal Journal. 28 (3): 132–141. doi:10.1177/002581726002800303. PMID 13701129.
- Fox, T. F. (November 1974). "William Bean, Communicator". Archives of Internal Medicine. 134 (5): 824. doi:10.1001/archinte.1974.00320230034003. PMID 4613294. (See William Bean.)
