= Spriggs =

Spriggs is a surname. Notable people with the surname include:

- Archibald E. Spriggs (1866–1921), lieutenant governor of Montana
- David Spriggs (footballer) (born 1981), Australian rules footballer
- Edmund Ivens Spriggs (1871–1949), British physician and medical researcher
- Elbert Eugene Spriggs (1937–2021), Founder, Twelve Tribes group
- Elizabeth Spriggs (1929–2008), English actress
- Francis Spriggs (died 1725), British pirate
- George Spriggs (baseball) (1937–2020), American baseball player
- George Spriggs (politician) (1926–2015), Australian politician
- James Spriggs Payne (1819–1882), President of Liberia
- Jason Spriggs (born 1994), American football player
- John T. Spriggs (1825–1888), U.S. Representative from New York
- Larry Spriggs (born 1959), American basketball player
- Leslie Spriggs (1910–1990), British Labour politician
- Marcus Spriggs (born 1974), American football player
- Matthew Spriggs, Australian archaeologist
- Robin Spriggs (born 1974), American writer
- Steve Spriggs (born 1956), English footballer
- William Spriggs (1955–2023), American public servant

== See also ==
- Sprigg (disambiguation)
- Sprigge
- Spriggs Payne Airport (IATA: MLW, ICAO: GLMR), 3 miles from Monrovia, the capital of the Republic of Liberia in West Africa
