= The Last and the First =

1971 novel by Ivy Compton-Burnett

- First edition
- Author: Ivy Compton-Burnett
- Language: English
- Genre: Novel
- Publisher: Victor Gollancz Ltd
- Publication date: 1971
- Publication place: United Kingdom
- Media type: Print (Hardcover)

The Last and the First is Ivy Compton-Burnett's posthumous novel, published in 1971, two years after her death. The work, complete if possibly awaiting revision, was untitled when it was discovered, and was so named as appropriate for her last novel, and also because of the Biblical quotation (Matthew 20:16) uttered (not for the first time in her canon) by one of the characters. It was assembled from "penciled notebooks" by Livia Gollancz.
