= Pastors and Masters =

1925 novel by Ivy Compton-Burnett

- First edition
- Author: Ivy Compton-Burnett
- Language: English
- Genre: Novel
- Publisher: Heath Cranton
- Publication date: 1925
- Publication place: United Kingdom
- Media type: Print
- Pages: 126

Pastors and Masters (Pastors and Masters: A Study in the first edition) is a short novel by Ivy Compton-Burnett published in 1925. Called "a work of genius" by The New Statesman, it was the author's second novel and the first in which she introduced the characteristic style of clipped, precise dialogue that was to make her name. It is largely a character study, dealing with themes of tyranny, female subservience and unconventional sexuality within the setting of a boys' preparatory school.

== Plot ==
The greater part of the book consists of a character study of the staff of a boys’ preparatory school and their small circle of friends – the ‘masters’ and the ‘pastors’ of the title. The school is owned and nominally headed by the 70-year-old self-absorbed Nicholas Herrick who has established it in an old university town to be near the college where he spent his youth, although he spends only about 10 minutes a day on school business. Living with Herrick is his unmarried half-sister Emily Herrick, 20 years his junior, who puts on a front of sarcastically extolling him in public while privately despising him. The Herricks are friendly with the Fletcher family comprising the elderly Reverend Peter Fletcher, his wife Teresa, his unmarried sister Lydia, and his nephew Francis.

The day-to-day running of the school is left to the senior master, Mr Merry, a man with no academic or personal qualifications for the role other than his ability to present the school in a wholly false favourable light to the parents of potential scholars. His wife Mrs Merry (known as ‘Mother’) helps out. The teaching staff comprise Miss Basden, an unmarried middle-aged schoolmistress, and Mr Burgess, a young and inexperienced graduate.

William Masson and Richard Bumpus are unmarried fellows of the college who have been close friends for 30 years and who "meant romance for each other in youth". Many years earlier Bumpus had written a short novel but, considering it not good enough for publication, had had his sole copy of the manuscript buried in the grave of a friend.

Herrick regrets that he has never got round to writing a novel, which in his eyes would make him a "real author”, though in truth it is his lack of talent. While clearing out the room of Crabbe, an elderly don who has recently died, Herrick comes across the typescript of a short novel. Believing that nobody knows about Crabbe’s writing, he steals it and claims that he has had a sudden inspiration for his long-overdue book. At about the same time Bumpus announces his intention to publish a new novel of his own, a complete rewriting of the book he had authored as a young man, though he says that in his case the death of Crabbe has caused his work to be put back. He does not tell anybody that the reason for the delay is that his typescript, which he had left in Crabbe’s room shortly before his death, has disappeared.

Herrick and Bumpus both announce that they intend to give readings of their respective new works. Before Bumpus can start, Masson surprises him by saying that he had actually kept, and read, Bumpus's youthful foray into fiction and that he is looking forward to comparing the two versions. When the two authors discover that their first sentences are identical it becomes clear that neither of them has written anything recently and that the only novel which ever existed is Bumpus's early work.

In the final chapter of the novel the Herricks, the Fletchers and the school staff arrange a dinner party to present a false but impressive facade to the autocratic Reverend Henry Bentley, an important parent with two boys at the school.

== Principal characters ==
- Mr Nicholas Herrick, school proprietor, 70
- Miss Emily Herrick, his half sister, 50
- Mr Charles Merry, senior schoolmaster, 50
- Mrs Emily Merry, his wife (called ‘Mother’ by her husband)
- Miss Basden, under mistress, teacher of French and music, 40
- Mr Burgess, under master, young graduate
- Richard Bumpus, academic, aged about 56
- William Masson, academic and intimate friend of Bumpus, 60
- Reverend Peter Fletcher, elderly cousin of Bumpus, 68
- Mrs Teresa Fletcher, his wife, friend of Emily Herrick
- Miss Lydia Fletcher, Peter's sister, 60
- Reverend Francis Fletcher, Peter's nephew
- Reverend Henry Bentley, 50s
- Miss Delia Bentley, Henry's daughter, 30
- Harry, 13, & John, 12, Henry's sons.

== Critical reception ==
The New Statesman said "As for Pastors and Masters, it is astonishing, alarming. It is like nothing else in the world. It is a work of genius. How to describe it – since there is nothing of which to take hold? ... No quotation could do this book justice".

== Themes and style ==
Although the book is now normally known as a novel, the first edition was entitled Pastors and Masters: A Study. It was described on the cover as "like nothing but itself" and as "a little book which is a study rather than a story, but which has a story in it".

It was in this novel that Compton-Burnett first introduced the characteristic style of clipped, precise dialogue that was to make her name. The book marked the start of what became a remarkable series of fierce but decorous novels dealing with tyranny and power struggles in secluded late-Victorian households, written almost entirely in mordantly witty dialogue. Although Compton-Burnett had in 1911 published an earlier novel (Dolores), she considered that to have been an apprentice piece and she never listed it among her publications.

Writing in The Spectator in 2009, the novelist Francis King noted that even in this early work Compton-Burnett had perfected her skill in implying what her characters think without either her or them openly revealing it. The novel includes some types, he said, that reappear in various guises in the author’s later works: tyrants who, though full of self pity, brutally victimise all those around them; and decent and loyal female slaves who dedicate themselves to the unrewarding task of trying to keep their families happy. King also considered it astonishing that, while E. M. Forster was agonising over whether he could publish his homosexual novel Maurice, Compton-Burnett, a seemingly prim spinster, "should have already embarked on dealing with unconventional sexuality with such candour and aplomb".

Pamela Hansford Johnson noted that "this small, quiet, blistering book ... almost solid with conversations" came into the world in 1925, unrelated in any way to that year's actual realities, fantasies, hopes, and fears.
