= The Present and the Past =

1953 novel by Ivy Compton-Burnett

- First edition
- Author: Ivy Compton-Burnett
- Language: English
- Genre: Novel
- Publisher: Victor Gollancz
- Publication date: 1953
- Publication place: United Kingdom
- Media type: Print (hardback)

The Present and the Past (1953) is a novel by Ivy Compton-Burnett. It follows the head of a family who, although outwardly powerful and in charge, is suffering under the fact that he is being belittled and at some point even outright ignored by family and servants alike.

== Plot introduction ==
After five years of marriage, Cassius Clare and his wife Catherine cannot bear each other any longer and decide to get a divorce. Although the separation is basically amicable, it is Cassius Clare's condition that Catherine leave their two sons—Fabian, aged four, and Guy, aged two—under his custody and never see them again. Catherine Claire accepts, and for the next nine years disappears from their life.

== Plot summary ==
When the novel opens Catherine has decided she can bear it no longer not to see her boys. Openly confessing that she is breaking her promise, she announces that she would like a reunion. In the meantime, Cassius Clare has remarried and has had three more children by the second Mrs Clare: eight-year-old Henry, seven-year-old Megan, and Tobias, aged three. With the help of a head nurse, a nursemaid, and a governess, Flavia Clare has been a perfect mother to all five children, never drawing a line between her own flesh and blood and the two oldest children by her husband's first marriage. But when Fabian and Guy learn about their natural mother's plans, the biological bond proves to be stronger than any care that could be given them by their stepmother, and they want to meet her. Cassius Clare, in an awkward position of wanting to please each member of his family, agrees to Catherine's wish, although right from the start it is clear to all members of the family that she will want to see her two sons on a regular basis once the first meeting has taken place.

To Cassius Clare's dismay, the two women get on astonishingly well with each other. Seemingly without a job which demands his time and attention, Clare feels neglected and soon starts pitying himself. This feeling is enhanced when, casually conversing with his sons, he realises that they do not think highly of him either. For example, asked to say which people he likes best, 13-year-old Fabian comes up with the following list: (1) Catherine, his biological mother; (2) Guy, his brother; and (3) Flavia (whom he calls "Mater"), his stepmother—with his father altogether absent from the list. Similarly, three-year-old Tobias's favourites turn out to be Catherine, Bennet, the head nurse; his sister Megan; and William, the middle-aged gardener.

It seems Cassius Clare takes these pronouncements very seriously, in spite of their being uttered by children. His only comfort is his father, a man of over 70 who has moved in with his son's family after his wife's death and who is just waiting for his own. The one other person who seems to be close to him is Alfred Ainger, the 40-year-old butler. Clare actually discusses with his father how the family might react if he committed suicide and how the natural order of things would be turned upside down if he died before his own father.

It never becomes quite clear whether this conversation is meant to be a cry for help. When people keep paying no attention whatsoever to him, Cassius Clare takes his father's pills, ten of which taken together constitute a lethal dose. Clare, however, as a sort of "compromise", takes only four tablets, thus deceiving his family, who think he has really tried to kill himself. A doctor is called for, but he cannot do anything about Clare's condition: the patient just has to wait until the effects of the drug wear off.

Cassius Clare considers his scheme to have been at least partly successful when, unexpectedly, Tobias finds the phial with the remaining tablets, and, as there are more of them left than he has claimed, Clare's "deceit" is discovered. Everybody, including the servants, are embarrassed that the head of the family is both weak and a liar, and after Clare's speedy recovery he is appalled to find out that he is still not given the amount of love and attention he thinks he is entitled.

When, obviously only a few days later, Ainger finds him lying on the sofa in very much the same manner as during his faked suicide attempt, the butler does not do anything about it: he neither calls the doctor, nor does he inform Flavia about her husband's state. When the family eventually do start worrying about Clare's health the latter is already dead: now it turns out that, at the age of 52, he has had a heart attack (or something like that), that his life could have been saved but that he has just been left dying without any help.

The remaining family members now realise that far-reaching changes will have to be made. Although they do not blame each other or themselves for Clare's death, they all agree that the two women could not possibly go on living under the same roof and raising their five children together. Catherine is prepared to leave the house for good, but on condition that she can take her two sons with her if they wish to go. When Catherine puts the question to them, it is Fabian who spontaneously decides to go with his biological mother. Guy, on the other hand, would not want to leave "Mater", but his relationship to his older brother proves to be the stronger, and so he makes up his mind to go with him.

The novel received a brief contemporary notice from Kirkus Reviews, which described Compton-Burnett's style as displaying "precise, poised, studied, epigrammatic artistry" while noting it appealed to "a select market". The Irish Times later called it "short, elegantly dry in tone, full of characters who constantly shed po-faced epigrams, and with the usual family tensions and undertones." The novel is among those cited in assessments of Compton-Burnett's broader literary reputation: V. S. Pritchett wrote in 1955 that she was "the most original novelist now writing in English", and Joyce Carol Oates described her work as "Aeschylus and Sophocles funnily reinvented by Oscar Wilde."

== Quotes ==
- "It is so dignified to suffer." "But not to cause suffering."
- "Do we do everything for our own advantage?" "Yes, I think we do. No one else does anything for it. So it takes all our time to get enough done."
- "Perhaps that is the difference between a bad person and a good; that the one reveals himself, and the other has the proper feeling to hide it."
- "It is easier to face death than to face life."

== See also ==
- Family saga
