= Manservant and Maidservant =

1947 novel by Ivy Compton-Burnett

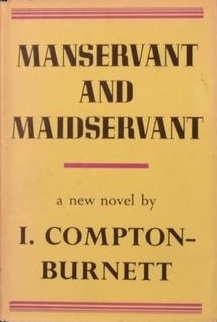
- First edition
- Author: Ivy Compton-Burnett
- Publisher: Victor Gollancz
- Publication date: 1947

Manservant and Maidservant is a 1947 novel by Ivy Compton-Burnett. It was published in the United States with the title Bullivant and the Lambs.

When asked in 1962 which of her novels were her favourites, Compton-Burnett referred to Manservant and Maidservant and A House and Its Head. It was republished in 2001 by New York Review Books and in 2022 by Pushkin Press, after being out of print for many years.

“Manservant and Maidservant is among the funniest and most surprising of Compton-Burnett's inventions. It focuses on the household of Horace Lamb, sadist, skinflint, and tyrant, a man whose children fear and hate him and whose wife is planning to elope [with Horace's cousin]. But it is when Horace undergoes an altogether unforeseeable change of heart that the real difficulties begin. Is the repentant master a victim along with his sometime slaves? What compensation, or consolation, can there be for the wrongs that have been done?” — from the back cover of the NYRB Classics edition, 2001.

== Plot ==
In 1892 Horace Lamb lives on an inherited estate with his wife, their five children, his extended family and a slew of servants including the butler Bullivant. Though Horace is wealthy through his marriage to Charlotte he insists on controlling her money in a miserly way. The ones who suffer the most from his economy are his children (in particular his eldest Sarah) who dress in rags and are constantly cold and hungry. Charlotte and Horace's cousin Mortimer, who is his dependent, plan to run away together. Before this can be accomplished Charlotte is called to visit her ailing father.

The children are taught by their great-aunt Emilia, however Horace is eventually persuaded to hire a tutor, Gideon Doubleday, for the elder children. After Gideon takes a casual invitation from Horace seriously he decides to return the favour by asking the Lambs to meet his mother, Gertrude, and sister, Magdalen. Gertrude takes an immediate interest in Horace while Magdalen develops feelings for Mortimer. The two families grow closer in Charlotte's absence and Gertrude hints to Horace that her daughter and Mortimer might marry some day which he finds appalling.

Charlotte abruptly returns and discovers her children well-clothed and fed and her husband repentant. Horace claims to have seen the error in his ways but reveals he is aware of the plot between Charlotte and Mortimer. Charlotte decides to stay with Horace, despite no longer loving him, in order to maintain family harmony. Horace reveals that he will only continue to pay for Mortimer if he marries Magdalen and moves elsewhere. With no other options Mortimer assents.

Mortimer discovers however that an intimate letter of Charlotte's that she sent to a letter drop-off run by a Miss Buchanan has gone astray. He learns that it was accidentally collected by Gertrude who gave it to Magdalen to return. Acting in her own interest Magdalen instead opened the letter and then dropped it in the Lamb household in front of Horace. Because of the deception Mortimer breaks off his engagement with Magdalen and instead goes to live in a boarding house recommended by Bullivant. Before he leaves he tells Bullivant that the letter incident has made him realize that Miss Buchanan is illiterate. He urges Bullivant to socialize with her which he does. However during fits of irritation Bullivant occasionally places Miss Buchanan in an awkward position by asking her to read. He later shares Miss Buchanan's secret with the cook, Mrs. Selden.

Despite the betrayal Horace misses Mortimer deeply. When he discovers that his two eldest sons conspired to let him die in an accident he is further distraught. Mortimer arrives just after Horace discovers the betrayal and persuades Horace to let him back into the house reasoning that it was Mortimer's relationship with Charlotte that inspired Horace to mend his ways and that he no longer loves Charlotte knowing that she will always put her children first.

Going for a walk to reflect upon his children's betrayal, Horace narrowly escapes death and blames his sons when discovering one of their pocket knives near the scene of the crime. However it is quickly revealed that George, a young servant who resents his position and who has been stealing from the family, conspired to hurt Horace. George is punished by Bullivant who hopes that he will repent, though this seems far from likely.

Horace grows sick from the cold and almost dies, causing the household to repent of their actions to him, and then makes a miraculous recovery. Miss Buchanan visits the servants and her secret is revealed by George, who then confesses he overheard Bullivant tell the cook. Though Miss Buchanan believes she will be illiterate until she dies, the teenage cook's assistant Miriam offers to teach her as she taught young children in the orphanage where she grew up.

== Characters ==
The Lamb Family

- Horace Lamb, a gentleman in his 50s who runs the Lamb household and who is cheap and cruel
- Charlotte Lamb, Horace's wealthy wife who is having an affair with Mortimer
- Mortimer Lamb, Horace's poor cousin who depends on his charity to survive
- Aunt Emilia, Horace and Mortimer's aunt who is in her 70s
- Sarah Lamb, Horace and Charlotte's eldest daughter
- Jasper Lamb, Horace and Charlotte's eldest son
- Marcus Lamb, Horace and Charlotte's second son
- Tamasin Lamb, Horace and Charlotte's second daughter
- Avery Lamb, the baby of the family

The Servants

- Bullivant, a non-descript manservant who works for the Lambs
- George, a secondary servant born in a workhouse who is employed by Horace
- Mrs. Selden, an unmarried Cook
- Miriam, the Cook's assistant and a female equivalent to George

The Doubledays

- Gideon Doubleday, a tutor in his 40s
- Gertrude Doubleday, Gideon's mother, an unattractive woman who resembles George Eliot
- Magdalen Doubleday, Gideon's sister
- Miss Buchanan, an illiterate woman who runs a small goods store
