= Robert Fortescue Fox =

British physician and surgeon (1858–1940)

- Born: 24 December 1858; Stoke Newington
- Died: 15 June 1940 (aged 81); London
- Occupations: Physician and medical editor
- Known for: Principles and Practice of Medical Hydrology (1913)

Robert Fortescue Fox FRCP (1858–1940) was a British physician, surgeon, and one of the founders of physical medicine and rehabilitation.

== Biography ==
R. Fortescue Fox qualified MRCS in 1882 at the London Hospital in 1882 and was house physician to Sir Andrew Clark. However, Fox developed tuberculosis, and went on a voyage to China as a ship's surgeon. Upon his return he went to Strathpeffer Spa in Ross-shire, where he recovered his health, practised medicine, and gained knowledge of balneology. In 1905 he returned to London and in 1913 published Principles and Practice of Medical Hydrology, adding to his reputation as an authority on British and foreign spas.

During the 1914-1918 War his specialised practice vanished and he concentrated on the care of the disabled. He insisted on the value of various forms of baths and exercise for the restoration of injured limbs; he wrote Physical Remedies for Disabled Soldiers (1917), worked with Sir Robert Jones at the Military Orthopaedic Hospital, Shepherd’s Bush, and introduced the "whirlpool " arm and leg baths.

Robert Fortescue Fox, the most prominent British figure in twentieth-century spa medicine, promoted the use of the term, 'medical hydrology', which he defined as 'the science of waters, vapours, and mineral deposits in connection with waters, as used in medicine, both by internal administration and in the form of baths and applications ...

He was a strong advocate of treatment and training of the disabled war veterans, and became the first medical director of the Enham Village Centre, which opened in 1919. He continued as director for a year. Fox was instrumental in the creation of the British Red Cross Clinic for Rheumatism. He was one of the founders of the British Health Resorts Association. He was mainly responsible for the creation of the International Society of Medical Hydrology in 1921 and edited the Archives of Medical Hydrology for several years from 1922. He was elected FRCP in 1925.

R. Fortescue Fox's father was the seventh son of Quaker surgeon Joseph John Fox, who came from an unbroken line of Quaker doctors for five generations. All of the seven sons became doctors. The third son was Richard Hingston Fox, FRCP. Robert Fortescue Fox married Katherine Stewart MacDougall (1860–1937) and was the father of three daughters and three sons. The three daughters were Constance Mary (1886–1965), Hilda Angell (1887–1966), and Charlotte Iris (1890–1926). The three sons were William Fortescue (1892–1897), Andrew Stewart (1893–1915), and Theodore Fortescue (1899–1989). Andrew Stewart Fox was killed in action in WWI.

== Selected publications ==
- Fox RF (1911). "Outlines of Medical Hydrology (The Samuel Hyde Memorial Lectures). Lecture III: The Medicinal Spring: the Teaching of Medical Hydrology. The Science of Water and of Waters, with a Plea for its Practice and Teaching in Britain". Proc R Soc Med. 4(Balneol Climatol Sect) (Balneol Climatol Sect): 101–118. PMC 2004251. PMID 19974865.
- Fox RF (30 January 1915). "Baths for wounded soldiers". Br Med J. 1 (2822): 206–208. doi:10.1136/bmj.1.2822.206. PMC 2301661. PMID 20767470.
- Fox RF (17 July 1915). "British Health Resorts in Peace and War Being the Third Chadwick Lecture, delivered at the Royal Society of Medicine, June 10th, 1915". Br Med J. 2 (2846): 81–83. doi:10.1136/bmj.2.2846.81. PMC 2302558. PMID 20767726.
- Physical remedies for disabled soldiers. London: Baillière, Tindall & Cox. 1917.
- Fox, R. F. (28 November 1931). "Physical medicine and medical hydrology". Br Med J. 2 (3699): 1006–1007. doi:10.1136/bmj.2.3699.1006-a. PMC 2315521.
- Fox RF (29 February 1936). "Chronic Rheumatism". Br Med J. 1 (3921): 409–412. doi:10.1136/bmj.1.3921.409. PMC 2457971. PMID 20779787.
