= Naneelu =

Form of Telugu literature

Naneelu is a form of Telugu literature which contains 4 lines and a minimum of 20 letters, not exceeding 25. This form was introduced by Sahitya Akademi Award winner Professor N. Gopi.

Naneelu was introduced in the year 1998 by Dr N Gopi through his book Naeelu.

== Properties ==
Naneelu should have 4 lines and never have less than 20 and never exceed 25 letters. If one were to pause at the end of the second line, the executed meaning is incomplete. At the same time, the first is not clear unless one reads the second part. That means though appearing as identical in structure and as two sentences, the poem reaches completion only when united in thought.

== Nomenclature ==
Nani is a word used in Telugu Community to call their children with love. Dr N Gopi wanted to name this form with something very connected to Telugu people. So, he considered this name.

And Gopi in his book also said "Naneelu belong to you and to me - 'na' and 'nee' mean in Telugu 'my' and 'your' respectively, and the end 'lu' indicative of the plural number of the poems - in short, they belong to all of us"

- A poem from Gopi's Naneelu

Grieve not
for the broken earthen pot.
The earth is preparing
to shape anew
