= The Lancet =

- Cover of Volume 393, 2 March 2019
- Discipline: Medicine (General & Internal)
- Language: English
- Edited by: Richard Horton

Publication details
- History: 1823–present
- Publisher: Elsevier (United Kingdom)
- Frequency: Weekly
- Open access: Hybrid
- Impact factor: 109.0 (2025)

Standard abbreviations
- ISO 4: Lancet

Indexing
- CODEN: LANCAO
- ISSN: 0140-6736 (print); 1474-547X (web)
- LCCN: sf82002015
- OCLC no.: 01755507

Links
- Journal homepage; Online access; Webpage at publisher's site

The Lancet is a weekly peer-reviewed general medical journal, founded in England in 1823. It is one of the world's highest-impact academic journals and one of the oldest medical journals still in publication.

The journal publishes original research articles, review articles (divided into seminars and reviews), editorials, book reviews, correspondence, as well as news features and case reports. The Lancet has been owned by Elsevier since 1991, and its editor-in-chief since 1995 has been Richard Horton. The journal has editorial offices in London, New York City, and Beijing.

== History ==
The Lancet was founded in 1823 by Thomas Wakley, an English surgeon who named it after the surgical instrument called a lancet (scalpel). Wakley was motivated to create the journal due to alleged corruption of medical services he saw in London. On its founding, the journal had a "radical slant", challenging what its founder saw as the corruption, nepotism, and incompetence of the academic establishment of its day. Throughout its history, the journal has been considered one of the most prestigious in the world and has played an important role in reforming the healthcare system of the United Kingdom.

1823 issue of The Lancet, written by Thomas Wakley, explained the journal's purpose. Wakley said its goal was to inform and teach the people about medicine. Wakley then began reprinting lectures from his professor at United Hospitals for free in the journal. This caused some controversy, as the lectures usually cost £15 to listen and were republished without permission. The Lancet was eventually sued by multiple people for copyright infringement and defamation; every lawsuit was won by the journal, increasing its reputation among readers. Two years after the journal's foundation, over 4,000 people subscribed to The Lancet; its publications cost sixpence. The Lancet's readership grew, and many people started writing for the journal, including pamphleteer William Cobbett. Seven years after The Lancet's foundation, the journal's subscriptions grew to 8,000+. In 1840, the journal experienced growth and "dominated" medical news in the UK.

Members of the Wakley family retained editorship of the journal until 1908. In 1921, The Lancet was acquired by Hodder & Stoughton. Elsevier acquired The Lancet from Hodder & Stoughton in 1991. The Lancet is known for its positive views on social justice. The journal expressed its solidarity with the George Floyd protests in 2020 and formed a "Group for Racial Equity"; it also published a special issue in December 2022 that discussed promoting racial and ethnic equity in science and other practices. Richard Horton, its editor-in-chief since 1995, has stated that the journal practices "health equity" by dedicating more articles on problems related to low and middle-income countries, more than other medical journals. Senior editor of the journal, Maneet Virdi, has said that The Lancet stands against racism and all other forms of discrimination.

=== Articles ===
During its early existence, the journal exposed unhygienic conditions at multiple hospitals, prompting the government to take action. The journal wrote an article about the first ever blood transfusion by physician James Blundell. In 1867, surgeon Joseph Lister, writing for the journal, explained how antiseptic can be used to treat abscesses. In 1915, physician Charles Samuel wrote the first ever article about shell shock in the journal. In 1918, psychiatrist William Rivers wrote another article about shell shock in The Lancet. Some articles published during the journal's early existence covered more than medicine. Until 1825, The Lancet published gossip about celebrities, political news and literary correspondence. In late 2020, German doctors who treated Alexei Navalny after he was poisoned by the FSB published an article in the journal about the incident; the article detailed their use of cholinesterase inhibitor to save him and his path to recovery. The Press Secretary of the President of Russia, Dmitry Peskov, commented on the Lancet article as follows: "We do not read medical publications".

Reportedly, The Lancet accepts only 5% of articles submitted, with each article being reviewed by the journal's staff within 72 hours. If an article passes editorial review, it undergoes an extensive peer review process, following which it may be published. The publishing guidelines state that the journal considers every article that "advances or illuminates medical science or practice, or that educates or entertains the journal's readers". All potential authors for the journal must follow authorship rules created by International Committee of Medical Journal Editors. While article submission to the journal is free, authors opting to publish open access will be charged a fee. The Lancet has published over 10,000 articles in total and has 1.8 million active users.

== Ranking and impact ==
=== Journal ranking summary (2024) ===
The Lancet is consistently ranked among the top journals in general medicine based on major citation indexes:

Source	Category	Rank	Percentile	Quartile
Scopus	General Medicine in Medicine	1 of 636	99.84	Q1
IF (Web of Science)	Medicine, General & Internal	1 of 325	99.80	Q1
JCI (Web of Science)	Medicine, General & Internal	2 of 329	99.39	Q1

=== Impact Factor ===
According to Journal Citation Reports, the journal had a 2025 impact factor of 109.0, ranking it first above The New England Journal of Medicine in the category "Medicine, General & Internal". According to BMJ Open in 2017, The Lancet was more frequently cited in general newspapers around the world than The BMJ, NEJM and JAMA.

=== LANCET group journals ===
Along with The Lancet, the group publishes several other journals under the Lancet Group of Journals.

=== Other metrics ===
- Journal Citation Indicator (Clarivate, Web of Science): 23.29 (2024), ▲23.89 (2025)
- CiteScore (Elsevier, Scopus): 636 (2023), ▲668 (2024), ▲669 (2025)
  - Top in category, followed by Nature Reviews Methods Primers and New England Journal of Medicine
- H-index (Google Scholar): 375 (2020-2024)
  - Sixth among tracked publications, where Nature is 1st

== Scientific controversies ==
=== Andrew Wakefield and the MMR vaccine (1998) ===
The Lancet was criticised after it published a paper in 1998 in which the authors suggested a link between the MMR vaccine and autism spectrum disorder. In February 2004, The Lancet published a statement by 10 of the paper's 13 coauthors repudiating the possibility that MMR could cause autism. Editor-in-chief Richard Horton went on the record to say the paper had "fatal conflicts of interest" that the study's lead author, Andrew Wakefield, had not declared to The Lancet. The journal completely retracted the paper on 2 February 2010, after Wakefield was found to have acted unethically in conducting the research. The Lancet's six editors, including the editor-in-chief, were also criticised in 2011 because they had "covered up" the "Wakefield concocted fear of MMR" with an "avalanche of denials" in 2004.

=== Iraq War death toll estimates (2004–2006) ===
The Lancet published an estimate of the Iraq War's Iraqi death toll—around 100,000—in 2004. In 2006, a follow-up study by the same team suggested that the violent death rate in Iraq was not only consistent with the earlier estimate, but had increased considerably in the intervening period. The second survey estimated that there had been 654,965 excess Iraqi deaths as a consequence of the war. The 95% confidence interval was 392,979 to 942,636. 1,849 households that contained 12,801 people were surveyed.

=== PACE study (2011) ===
In 2011, The Lancet published a study by the UK-based "PACE trial management group", which reported success with graded exercise therapy and cognitive behavioural therapy for myalgic encephalomyelitis/chronic fatigue syndrome (ME/CFS). A follow-up study was published in Lancet Psychiatry in 2015. The studies attracted criticism from some patients and researchers, especially with regard to conclusions from data analysis that was different from that described in the original protocol. In a 2015 Slate article, biostatistician Bruce Levin of Columbia University was quoted saying "The Lancet needs to stop circling the wagons and be open", and that "one of the tenets of good science is transparency"; while Ronald Davis of Stanford University said: "the Lancet should step up to the plate and pull that paper". Horton defended The Lancet's publication of the trial and called the critics: "a fairly small, but highly organized, very vocal and very damaging group of individuals who have, I would say, actually hijacked this agenda and distorted the debate so that it actually harms the overwhelming majority of patients".

Starting in 2011, critics of the studies filed Freedom of Information Act requests to get access to the authors' primary data to learn what the trial's results would have been under the original protocol. In 2016, some of the data was released, which allowed calculation of results based on the original protocol and found that additional treatment led to no significant improvement in recovery rates over the control group.

The results from the PACE trial have been used to promote graded exercise therapy; however, these recommendations are now viewed by most public health bodies as outdated and highly harmful to ME/CFS patients.

=== Surgisphere study on the use of hydroxychloroquine and chloroquine (2020) ===
In May 2020, The Lancet published an observational retrospective cohort study by Mandeep R. Mehra of the Harvard Medical School and Sapan S. Desai of Surgisphere Corporation, which concluded that the malaria drugs hydroxychloroquine and chloroquine did not improve the condition of COVID-19 patients, and may have harmed some of them.

In response to concerns raised by members of the scientific community and the media about the veracity of the data and analyses, The Lancet decided to launch an independent third party investigation of Surgisphere and the metastudy. Specifically, The Lancet editors wanted to "evaluate the origination of the database elements, to confirm the completeness of the database, and to replicate the analyses presented in the paper" The independent peer reviewers in charge of the investigation notified The Lancet that Surgisphere would not provide the requested data and documentation. The authors of the study then asked The Lancet to retract the article, which was done on 3 June 2020.

To improve quality control, the editors of The Lancet Group announced changes to the editorial policy in a comment titled "Learning from a retraction" which was published on 22 September 2020.

=== COVID-19 Commission US lab origin conspiracy theory (2022) ===
In September 2022, The Lancet published the report of their COVID-19 Commission headed by economist Jeffrey Sachs, who has claimed that COVID-19 came from a US "biotechnology" lab. Before the report's release, Sachs appeared on the podcast of Robert F. Kennedy Jr., who previously spread vaccine conspiracy theories. On the podcast episode, Sachs claimed that "Government officials such as Anthony Fauci "are not being honest" about the virus's origins".

The published report included claims that "independent researchers have not yet investigated" US labs, and said the National Institutes of Health "resisted disclosing details" of its work. Virologist Angela Rasmussen commented that this may have been "one of The Lancet's most shameful moments". David Robertson from the University of Glasgow's Centre for Virus Research said it was "really disappointing to see such a potentially influential report contributing to further misinformation on such an important topic" and it was "true we've details to understand on the side of natural origins, for example the exact intermediate species involved, but that doesn't mean there's ... any basis to the wild speculation that US labs were involved."

=== Tissue-engineered trachea transplant (2023) ===
In October 2023, The Lancet retracted two papers from 2008 and 2014 by surgeon Paolo Macchiarini. These papers, which discussed the first tissue-engineered trachea transplant, were found to contain fabricated information following an investigation by the Swedish National Board for Assessment of Research Misconduct.

Before the 2023 retractions, in September 2015, The Lancet published an editorial titled, "Paolo Macchiarini is not guilty of scientific misconduct".

=== Talcum powder ===
In 2026, The Lancet retracted an unsigned commentary published in 1977 entitled "Cosmetic talc powder", which had been used extensively by lawyers as "scientific proof" of the safety of talc-containing products. Investigation by two researchers uncovered that the author of the commentary was a Johnson & Johnson paid consultant, which was a leader in the manufacture of talc products at the time.. This was a commentary based on research by Columbia Mailman School public health historians Gerald Markowitz and David Rosner.

== Editorial controversies ==
=== Tobacco ban proposal (2003) ===
A December 2003 editorial by the journal, titled "How do you sleep at night, Mr Blair?", called for tobacco use to be completely banned in the United Kingdom.

The Royal College of Physicians rejected their argument. John Britton, chairman of the college's tobacco advisory group, praised the journal for discussing the health problem, but concluded that a "ban on tobacco would be a nightmare." Amanda Sandford, spokesperson for the anti-tobacco group Action on Smoking and Health, stated that criminalising a behaviour 26% of the population practise "is ludicrous." She also said: "We can't turn the clock back. If tobacco were banned we would have 13 million people desperately craving a drug that they would not be able to get." The deputy editor of The Lancet responded to the criticism by arguing that no other measures besides a total ban would likely be able to reduce tobacco use.

The smokers' rights group FOREST stated that the editorial gave them "amusement and disbelief". Director Simon Clark called the journal "fascist", and argued that it is hypocritical to ban tobacco while allowing unhealthy junk foods, alcohol consumption, and participation in extreme sports. Health Secretary John Reid reiterated that his government was committed to helping people give up smoking. He added: "Despite the fact that this is a serious problem, it is a little bit extreme for us in Britain to start locking people up because they have an ounce of tobacco somewhere".

=== Open letter for the people of Gaza (2014) ===
In August 2014 and during the 2014 Israel–Gaza conflict, The Lancet published an "Open letter for the people of Gaza" in their correspondence section. In response, Jake Wallis Simons of The Daily Telegraph argued that the letter "condemned Israel in the strongest possible terms, but strikingly made no mention of Hamas' atrocities."

Mark Pepys, a member of the Jewish Medical Association, criticised the letter as being a "partisan political diatribe" inappropriate for a serious publication. Pepys criticised Richard Horton personally for allowing the publication of what he deemed to be political views; and one's that didn't align with his own.

=== Letter dismissing Covid lab-leak theory (2020) ===
On 19 February 2020, The Lancet published a letter signed by 27 scientists that stated: "We stand together to strongly condemn conspiracy theories suggesting that COVID-19 does not have a natural origin ... [Scientists] overwhelmingly conclude that this coronavirus originated in wildlife," adding: "Conspiracy theories do nothing but create fear, rumours, and prejudice that jeopardise our global collaboration in the fight against this virus." Criticism of the letter was focused on the fact that, according to emails obtained through the Freedom of Information Act, members involved in producing the letter concealed their involvement "to creat[e] the impression of scientific unanimity" and failed to disclose conflicts of interest.

After having published letters supporting only the natural origins theory, The Lancet published a letter in September 2021 from a group of 16 virologists, biologists, and biosecurity specialists saying that "Research-related hypotheses are not misinformation or conjecture" and that "Scientific journals should open their columns to in-depth analyses of all hypotheses." The Times of India described The Lancet's decision to publish the letter as a "u-turn".

In June 2024, The Lancet wrote an op-ed stating that "SARS-CoV-2 is a natural virus that found its way into humans through mundane contact with infected wildlife" and that "doubling down on flawed assumptions in the face of growing evidence calls motivations into question".

=== "Bodies with vaginas" controversy (2021) ===
The 25 September 2021 edition of The Lancet included a review of an exhibition about the history of menstruation at the Vagina Museum. The journal's cover displayed a quotation from the review that referred to women as "bodies with vaginas". The quotation drew strong criticism on Twitter accusing The Lancet of sexism, arguing that this language was "dehumanising" and an "unhelpful" attempt at inclusivity. Horton later issued an apology on the journal's website. According to the Sydney Morning Herald, the wording "was likely intended to encompass trans men too – those assigned female at birth."

=== Gaza death count report (2024) ===
On 5 July 2024, The Lancet published in its correspondence section a letter with an estimate of the number of direct and indirect deaths that may be caused in the coming months and years by the Gaza war. Using other conflicts, where the number of indirect deaths was 3 to 15 times higher than the number of direct deaths, the authors estimated the total number of conflict-related deaths by multiplying the reported deaths by five, and argued that in the coming months and years "it is not implausible to estimate that up to 186,000 or even more deaths could be attributable to the current conflict in Gaza". The estimate quickly gained traction in both international and regional media. Critics of the letter have published contested opinions, not corroborated by independent statistical analysis, questioning the application of indirect death ratios observed in past conflicts to a current one.

== List of editors ==
The following persons have been editors-in-chief of the journal:

- 1823: Thomas Wakley
- 1862: James Wakley
- 1886: T. H. Wakley and Thomas Wakley (junior)
- 1907: Thomas Wakley (junior)
- 1909: Samuel Squire Sprigge
- 1937: Egbert Morland
- 1944: Theodore Fox
- 1965: Ian Douglas-Wilson
- 1976: Ian Munro
- 1988: Gordon Reeves
- 1990: Robin Fox
- 1995–present: Richard Horton
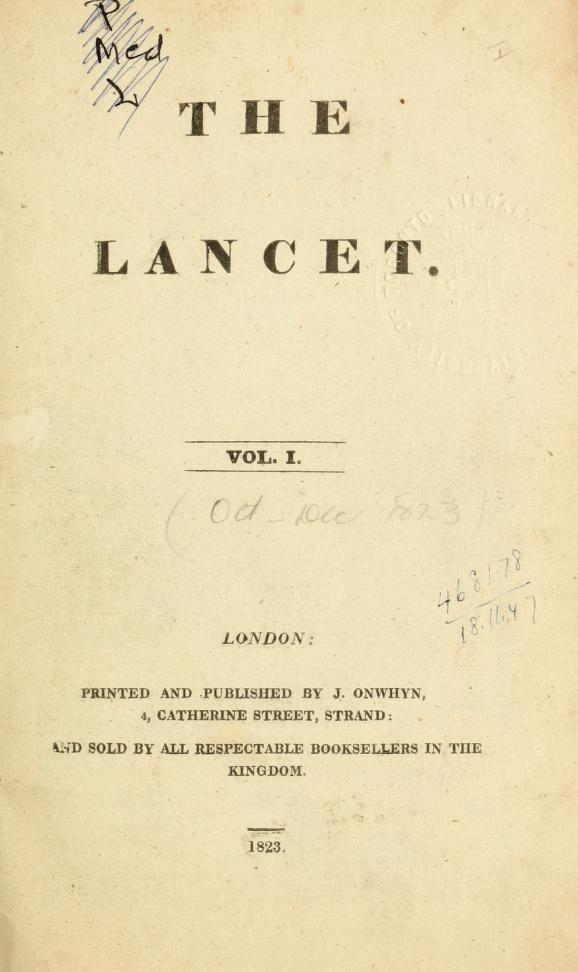
Volume 1, 1823

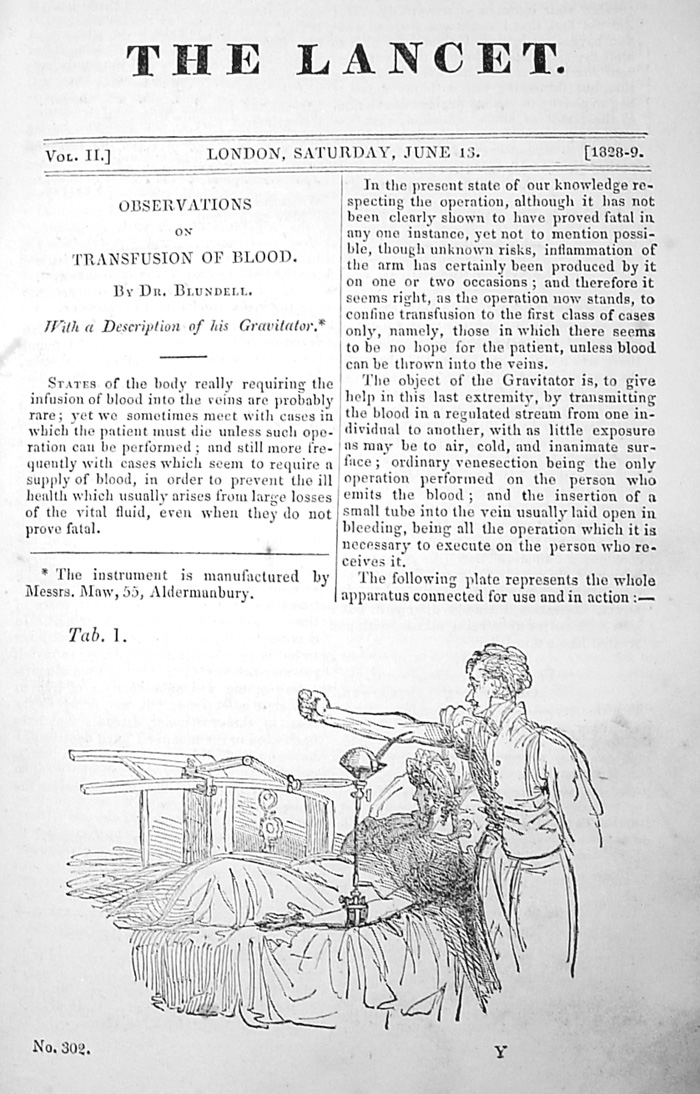
Observations on Transfusions of Blood, June 1829 issue

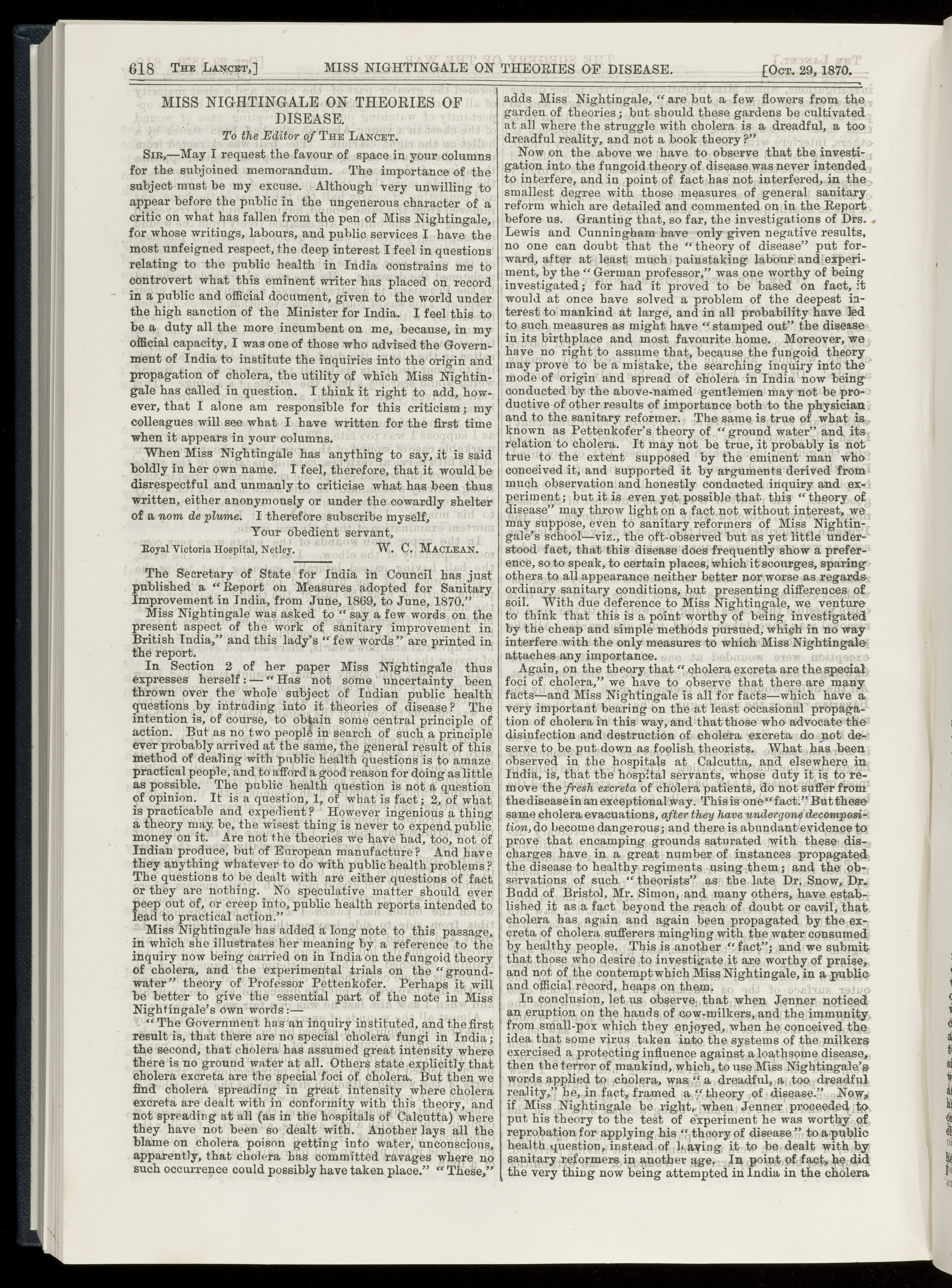
Miss Nightingale on Theories of Disease, October 1870

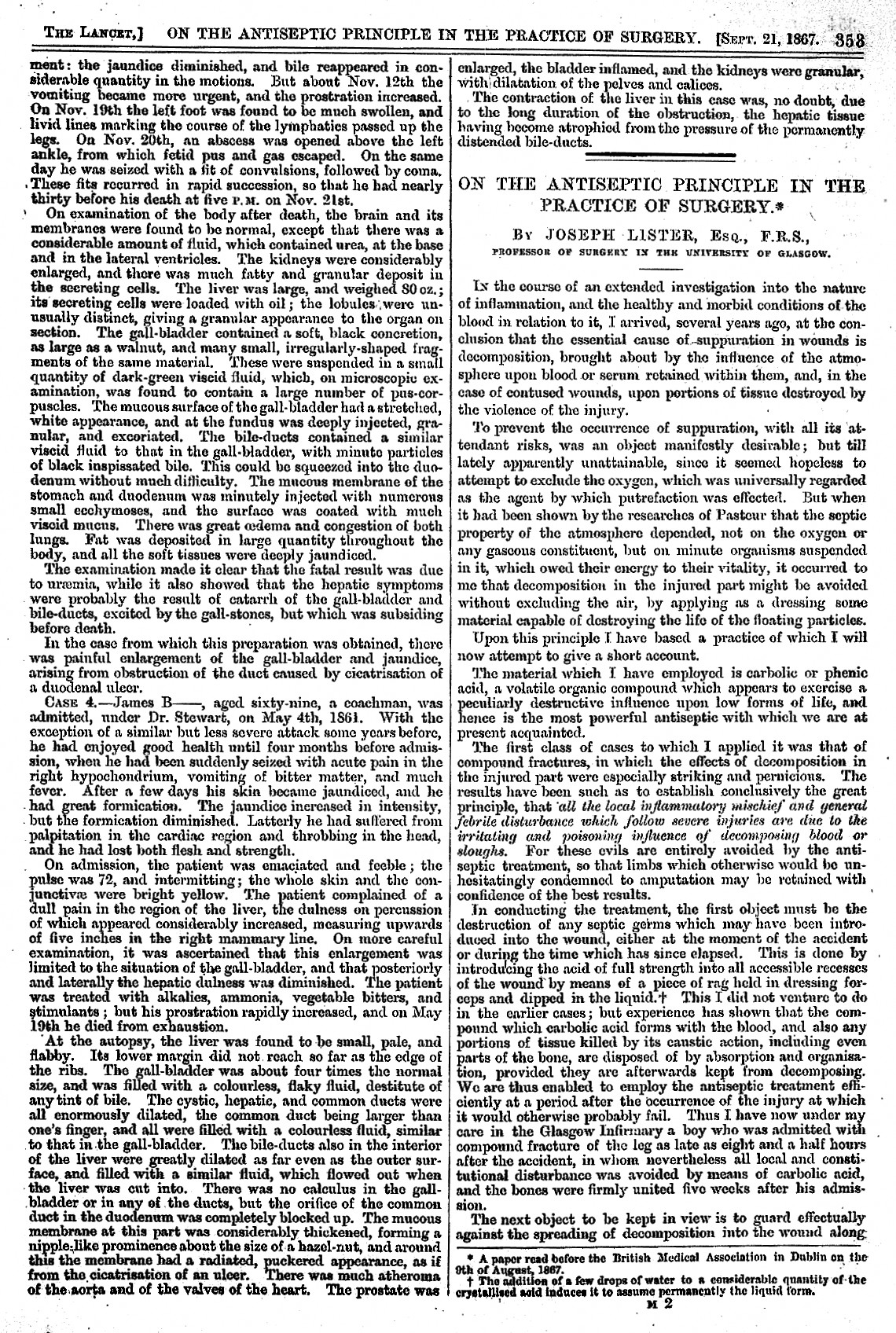
On the Antiseptic Principle in the Practice of Surgery by Joseph Lister, September 1867

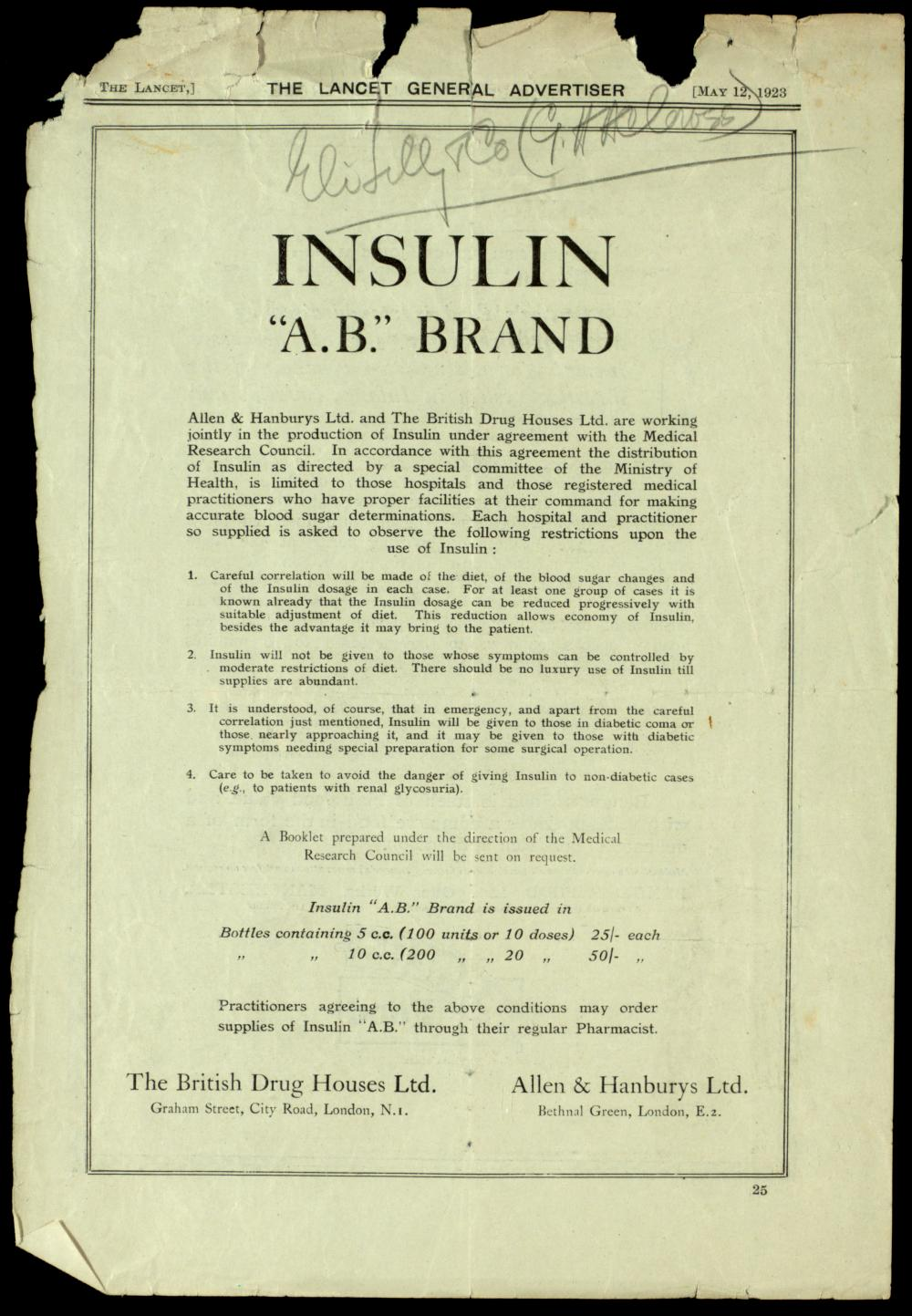
Advertisement for A.B. brand insulin, May 1923

== See also ==
- List of medical journals
- List of healthcare journals
