= Ralph Spirk =

Austrian footballer

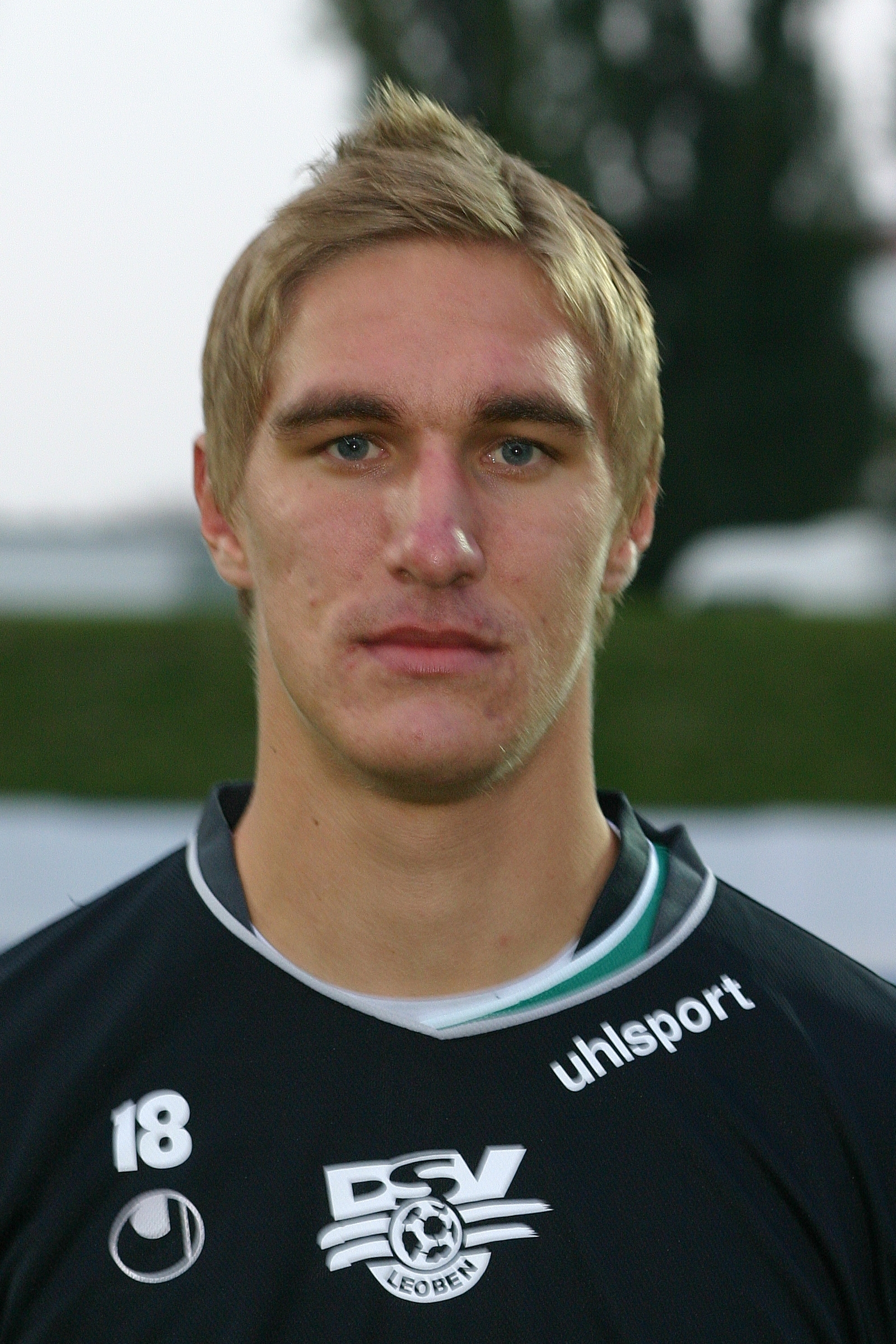

Personal information
- Date of birth: 26 October 1986 (age 40)
- Place of birth: Leoben, Austria
- Height: 1.84 m (6 ft 0 in)
- Position: Midfielder

Team information
- Current team: Grazer AK (assistant coach)

Youth career
- 1994–2000: FC Trofaiach
- 2000–2006: Grazer AK

Senior career*
Years	Team	Apps	(Gls)
2006–2007	Grazer AK	31	(3)
2007–2008	LASK Linz	3	(0)
2008	→ DSV Leoben (loan)	12	(2)
2009	Grazer AK	23	(5)
2010–2015	SV Kapfenberg	59	(5)
2015	FC Wacker Innsbruck	4	(0)
2016–2017	SV Lebring		

Managerial career
- 2018–: Grazer AK (assistant)
- 2021: Grazer AK (caretaker)
- * Club domestic league appearances and goals

Ralph Spirk (born 26 October 1986) is an Austrian football coach and a former player. He is an assistant coach with Grazer AK.

== Club career ==
Spirk made his professional debut at Grazer AK in the 2006/2007 season only to move to LASK Linz at the end of the season. He didn't experience much playing time in Linz however and in summer 2008, Spirk was loaned out for a year to Austrian Second Division side DSV Leoben.
