= Daughters and Sons =

1937 novel by Ivy Compton-Burnett

- First edition
- Author: Ivy Compton-Burnett
- Language: English
- Genre: Novel
- Publisher: Victor Gollancz
- Publication date: 1937
- Publication place: United Kingdom
- Media type: Print
- Pages: 320

Daughters and Sons is a 1937 novel by the English novelist Ivy Compton-Burnett. Written in the author's characteristic dialogue-heavy style, the novel explores the power struggles within a large family household, presided over by its tyrannical matriarch, Sabine Ponsonby, and her imperious daughter Hetta.

== Plot ==
The daughters and sons of the novel's title form an extended family who live together in a large house owned by the family matriarch, the 85-year-old Sabine Ponsonby. Her son, John, a widower, is a well-known but struggling novelist who is unable to bring in enough income to support his large family: Clare, 25, France, 24, Chilton, 18, Victor, 17 and Muriel, 12. John's unmarried sister, Hetta, runs the household and while ostensibly acting as John's assistant in fact controls him. The younger members of the family, having no independent means of their own, suffer under the crushing and manipulative rule of their grandmother Sabine and their aunt Hetta.

Unknown to her father, France has written a novel which has been accepted for publication. In order to avoid publishing under the same surname as her father, she has agreed with Muriel's new governess, Miss Hallam, that she should publish under her name, and that Miss Hallam will deal with the publisher's correspondence. France's novel is unexpectedly successful and wins a prize, allowing France to help her father financially. To avoid competing with and embarrassing him, she sends him a cheque from an anonymous 'grateful reader'. Sabine, meanwhile, has covertly been opening Miss Hallam's private correspondence, and she reads a letter from France's publisher. Believing that it is the governess who has won the prize, and that her literary talents will generate additional family income, she persuades her son to propose marriage. He is accepted, and the pair are married before the mistake is uncovered.

Hetta is horrified by Edith's new role within the family, partly because of the impact on her own position and partly because she knows that Edith did not write the book and cannot contribute financially. One morning, Hetta does not appear at breakfast. She has disappeared, leaving a suicide note. Extensive searches during the day fail to find her, and the family start to come to terms with the fact that they will not see her again. During breakfast the next morning, however, the door suddenly opens and Hetta's voice says, "Well, have you all had a lesson?"

The climax of the novel is a disastrous dinner party during which Hetta loses control and announces to the company that Edith has become John's wife only through deceit. Her speech appals the family, and Sabine, affected the most, dies on the spot without saying a word. Dr Chaucer, a family friend, pities and admires Hetta, however, and proposes marriage. Hetta departs to live with him. The novel closes as John Ponsonby, with his wife Edith by his side, at last becomes the head of his own household.

== Principal characters ==
- Sabine Ponsonby, 85, family matriarch
- John Ponsonby, widower, Sabine's son
- Henrietta (Hetta) Ponsonby, 48, Sabine's unmarried daughter
- Clare Ponsonby, 25, John's daughter
- France Ponsonby, 24, John's daughter
- Chilton Ponsonby, 18, John's son
- Victor Ponsonby, 17, John's son
- Muriel Ponsonby, 12, John's daughter
- Miss Bunyan, first governess to Muriel
- Dr Chaucer, family friend and uncle to Miss Bunyan
- Edith Hallam, second governess to Muriel; marries John Ponsonby
- Miss Blake, third governess to Muriel
- Charity Marcon, 57, unmarried family friend
- Stephen Marcon, 57, Charity's twin
- Alfred Marcon, Charity and Stephen's nephew
- Jane Seymour, unmarried family friend
- Sir Roland Seymour, 56, widower
- Evelyn Seymour, 34, Sir Roland's son

== Critical reception ==
Speaking of the novels as a whole, and of this one in particular, Alison Light in her book Forever England suggests that Compton-Burnett's fiction is a place where family ties subject us to the wills of others, and where we learn our first lessons in submission or tyranny. She notes that the novels offer us the family as an anatomy of authoritarianism. "Power without check, the power of adults to abuse children, husbands and wives to terrorise each other, of elders and betters to destroy rather than to protect the younger and weaker – it is a journey into the heart of darkness ... every bit as terrifying as Conrad's.

Virginia Woolf took Compton-Burnett seriously as a highbrow rival, and she recorded in her diary the sleepless nights occasioned by the favourable reviews received by Daughters and Sons compared with the less good reviews for her own 1937 novel The Years.
