= J. Bhagyalakshmi =

Indian journalist, poet and novelist

J. Bhagyalakshmi is an Indian journalist, poet, and novelist.

Bhagyalakshmi studied English Literature and trained in mass communication. She also obtained diplomas in Energo-Cybernatic Strategy Advance Management, Public relations and Book publishing Under Commonwealth Programme she completed a course in Publications and Design at COI, London. She also visited Bangladesh and Japan to study Rural development under the aegis of SAARC and Afro-Asian Rural Reconstruction Organisation.

Formerly of Indian Information Services, she held various media positions including Director (Media), (Ministry of Rural Development, and Chief Editor Yojana, (a magazine which is brought out in 13 languages). She taught at the Indian Institute of Mass Communication and headed the Department of Publications. She was Editor Communicator (IIMC), and also worked for Indian and Foreign Review (Ministry of External Affairs). As Editor, Publications Division she edited a number of books on varied themes. In the beginning of her career she worked with the Directorate of Advertising and Visual Publicity and with Union Public Service Commission as Research Officer.

Bhagyalakshmi writes poetry in English and Telugu. She is also known for her work in translating Telugu into other languages.

J. Bhagyalakshmi who made a mark as a bilingual writer has over 45 publications to her credit. Her work appeared in Triveni, and Vidura.

== Works ==
- Ivy Compton-Burnett and Her Art, Mittal Publications, 1986
- Capital witness: selected writings of G.K. Reddy Allied, 1991, ISBN 978-81-7023-316-9
- Happiness Unbound, Konark Publ., 1999, ISBN 978-81-220-0536-3
- A Knock at the Door, Konark Publishers, 2004, ISBN 978-81-220-0685-8
- When Fortune Smiled (all collections of poems)
- Kadedi Kavitakanarham: Maromajili and Maadee Swatantra Desam, Viśālāndhra Pabliṣiṅg Haus, 1987, (Telugu short stories)
- Ravindra geetalu (Gitanjali & The Crescent Noon in Telugu)
- Kathabharati (Hindi Short stories in Telugu)
- Living with Honour (Shiv Khera's book in Telugu)
- The Mind of Mahatma (Telugu)
- Human Rights (Telugu)
- I Will Not Let Time Sleep (N. Gopi's poems in English)
- Dew Drops (Vemuri Balaram's work in English)
- Abdul Kalam Kavitalu (Telugu translation of A. P. J. Abdul Kalam's Poetry).
- That's OK: Tammanna and Other Reveries, Alokparva Prakashan, 2007, ISBN 978-81-87416-65-4 is her collection of newspaper columns in English.

== Honors and awards ==
Bhagyalakshmi won the Rafi Ahmed Kidwai prize for short stories and the 2000 Jyeshta Literary Award for her collection of short stories written in Telugu, Maromajili.
