= N. Gopi =

Indian poet (born 1948)

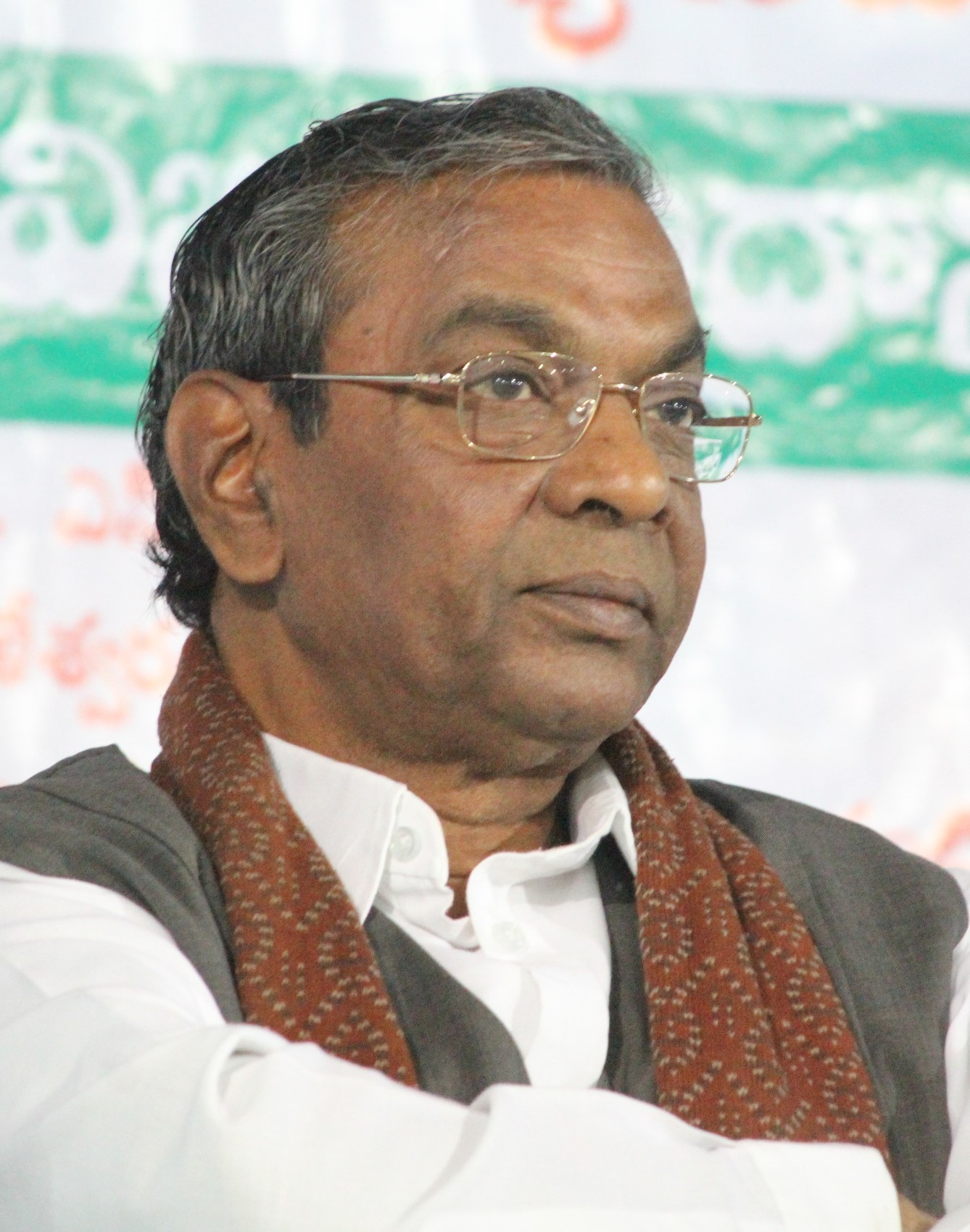
- Born: 25 June 1948 (age 78); Bhongir, Telangana
- Occupations: Poet, Literary critic, Professor (Retd.)
- Notable work: Praja Kavi Vemana (People's Poet, Thesis) (1978) Kaalaanni Nidra Ponivvanu (I Will Not Let Time Sleep, Poetry) (1998) Naneelu (The Little Ones, Experimental Poetry) (1998) Jala Geetham (Water Song, Epic Poem) (2002)
- Spouse: N Aruna
- Parents: Nakka Chennaiah (father); Nakka Lakshmamma (mother)

N. Gopi (Telugu: ఎన్. గోపి; born 25 June 1948) is an eminent Indian poet, and literary critic in Telugu and Sahitya Akademi Award recipient. He has also been in the University system as a professor and Dean since 1974, until retiring in 2008. He has also held the post of the Vice Chancellor of Potti Sreeramulu Telugu University, Hyderabad. Gopi's poetry displays nativity and a national outlook.

He has published 61 books including 30 poetry collections, 7 essay collections, 3 research works, 6 travelogues, 5 translations, 2 commentaries, and 4 column writings, apart from 3 textbooks for schools and for adult education projects.

His poetry collections have been translated into several Indian languages and foreign like Hindi, English, Gujarati, Tamil. Malayalam, Marathi, Konkani. Dogri, Maithili, Kannada, Punjabi, Sanskrit, Odia, Sindhi, Urdu, Assamese, Manipuri/Meitei, Bengali, Bodo, Kashmiri, Santali, Rajasthani, German, Chinese, Russian, and Persian.

His notable works are ‘Kalanni Nidra Ponivvanu’ (I Will Not let Time Sleep 1998); ‘Naneelu’ (The Little Ones 1998); ‘Jala Geetham’ (Water Song - a long poem 2002) and ‘Vruddhopanishath’ (Old Age poems 2019).

He was awarded the Sahitya Akademi Award in 2000 for his poetry collection, “Kaalanni Nidraponivvanu” (I will not let time sleep). He is also the recipient of 30 awards including the Freevers Front Award (1980), the Telugu University Award (1991) Delhi Telugu academy award (1999), an award for outstanding service to literature and culture by Sri Annamacharya Project of North America Chicago (SAPNA) US (2001), 'Kalaratna’ award by Government of Andhra Pradesh and Krittitwa Samagra Samman Award (2023)

== Early life and education ==
Born on 25 June 1948 in Bhongir village of Yadadri Bhongir District, Telangana State. After his schooling at Government High School, he chose to join Arts College, Osmania University, Hyderabad, where he did B.A. in Telugu, Sanskrit, and Linguistics group and stood with 6th rank, winning Nizam’s Gold Medal. This was followed by M.A. in Telugu, where he topped the University to win Gurajada Appa Rao Gold Medal from Osmania University in 1973. Later he did a P.G. Diploma in Applied Linguistics. Though his recorded name is Nakka Gopal, he is popularly known as N. Gopi in the literary field.

== Career ==
His first job was Project Officer in a Non-formal Project of UNICEF for one year. Later he joined as a Lecturer in the N.B Science College affiliated to Osmania University in 1974. Later he joined the OU in 1981. He became Professor of Telugu in 1990, Chairman Board of Studies in 1992 and Head of the Department in 1994. Later he was appointed as Vice Chancellor of Telugu University (1999-2002). He was the youngest VC in India when he was chosen for the post. In 2001, he also took an additional charge as an acting VC for Dravidian and Kakatiya Universities simultaneously. After completing his term as the VC of Telugu University, he came back to his parent university, where he served as the Dean Faculty of Arts (2004-2006). After retirement in 2008, he served as UGC Emeritus Fellow during 2011-13 and 2015-17 for the second time.

== Literary works ==
A prolific writer, Gopi has published 29 poetry collections so far.

=== Poetry ===
| Year | Name of the book | Name of the book (in English) | Notes |
|---|---|---|---|
| 1976 | Tangedu Poolu | Yellow Flowers | Received Devulapalli Krishna Shastri Award |
| 1982 | Mylu Raayi | Milestone | Received Feeverse Front award |
| 1989 | Chitra Deepaalu | Coloured Lights | Received Telugu University Best Poetry Award |
| 1993 | Vanthena | The Bridge | Received Samatha Rachayitala Sangam Award |
| 1998 | Kaalaanni Nidraponivvanu | I Will Not Let Time Sleep | Received Sahitya Akademi Award |
| 1998 | Naaneelu | The Little Ones | A trend setter poetic form adopted by nearly 1000 poets. So far 300 collections of this form have been published |
| 2000 | Chutta Kuduru | Circular Rest on Head | |
| 2002 | Enda Poda | Trace of Sunshine | |
| 2002 | Gopi Naneelu | Gopi's The Little Ones | |
| 2002 | Jala Geetham | The Water Song | A celebration of water as a prayer to water in the Vedic mode - bears testimony to this. It has been described as path breaking and translated into 11 languages, including Persian |
| 2004 | Maro Aakaasham | Another Sky | |
| 2005 | Aksharallo Dhagdhamai | Blazed Alphabets | |
| 2007 | Deepam oka ekantham | Lamp - A Solitude | |
| 2008 | Goa lo Samudram | Sea in Goa | |
| 2009 | Vana Kadigina Cheekati | Darkness Washed by Rain | |
| 2010 | Maa Vuru Maha Kaavyam | My Village an Epic | |
| 2011 | Rathi Keratalu | Rocky Tides | |
| 2013 | Hridaya Rashmi | Lustre of The Heart | |
| 2014 | Malli Vithanamloki | Back to the Seed | |
| 2015 | Purivippina Oopiri | An Unwinding of the Breath | |
| 2016 | Akashamlo Matti | Soil in the Sky | |
| 2017 | Jeevana Basha | Language of life | |
| 2018 | Evari Dukhamo Adi | Whose sorrow is that | |
| 2019 | China Padyalu | China Poems | |
| 2019 | Vridhopanishat | Old Age poems | |
| 2020 | Prapancheekarona | Prapancheekarona | |
| 2021 | Manishini kalisinattundaali | It should be like meeting a man | |
| 2023 | Kriya Oka Jeevana Laya | Action is a rhythm of life | |
| 2024 | Repati Maidanam | Tomorrow's Esplanade | |

=== Travelogues ===
- Nenu Chusina Mauritius (1996)
- Naa Cyprus Yaatra (2001)
- America lo Telugu Yaatra (2002)
- England lo 25 Rojulu (2004)
- Germany lo Kavitaa Yaatra (2015)
- Chinalo Kavitaa Yaatra (2019)

=== Literary criticism ===
- Vyasa Navami (1986)
- Gavaaksham (1992)
- Niluvettu Telugu Santhakam Sinare Vyaktitvam (1992)
- Saalochana - Peethikalu (1998)
- Vyaasa Kalasham (2012)
- Vyaasa Jignaasa (2016)

Other than these he wrote four travel books and many Translations

=== Research ===
- Vemana Vaadam - commentary (1979)
- Prajaakavi Vemana (1980)
- Vemana Padyaalu - Paris Prathi 1730 AD (1990)
- Toli Parishodhakulu (1998)
- Vemana Velugulu - commentary (2012)

Gopi's Ph.D thesis (1978) on ‘Saint Poet Vemana’ is a monumental work and is rated as the best research work among 20 of that kind in Telugu. This book has had 6 reprints till date. The thesis was also translated into Kannada language which is also a record.

=== Major editing ===
- Jnanpith Awardee "Dr. C. Narayana Reddy Samagra Sahityam" (Complete Works of CNR) (2001)
- Founder Editor of ‘Telugu Parishodana’, a research quarterly (1987)

=== Translations (into Telugu) ===
- Gnaana Devudu (1985)
- Tanmaya Dhooli (2012)
- Maa Oori Nadi (2016)
- Paagi (2016)
- Vidyapati Pranaya Geetaalu (2016)

=== Other writings ===
- Telugu Vaachakam - text book (1982)
- Prayojana Vaachakam - adult literacy (1983)
- Akshara Yaanam - column in India Today (2005)

== Father of Naneelu ==
Gopi's sixth poetry collection ‘Naneelu’ (1998) (Epigrams like Hykus), means ‘The Little Ones’. This is a poetic form invented by N.Gopi, widely discussed and followed by hundreds of poets. More than 1000 poets penned Naneelu and more than 500 poets published anthologies of Naanee collections. This 25 years old poetry form is a trendsetter in Telugu literature. Gopi’s Naneelu have been translated into 12 languages, including Russian.

== Awards and honours ==
Courtesy of his literary work and his service to Telugu literature, Gopi is a recipient of more than 50 awards. The following are some of his most recognized awards:

- Sahitya Akademi Award in 2000 for his poetry collection, ‘Kaalanni Nidra Ponivvanu’ (I Will Not Let Time Sleep)
- Jaini International Foundation Award for Jalageetham-Long Poem Rs.1 lakh Cash Award, 2018.
- Dr. Prof. Kothapalli Jayashankar Award with 1 lakh cash prize, a prestigious award instituted by Bharat Jagruthi-2023
- Krittitwa Samagra Samman Award (2023) by Bharatiya Bhasha Parishat, Kolkata
- Freeverse Front award in 1980 for his poetry collection, ‘Mylurayi’ (Milestone)
- Telugu University Award (1991)
- Delhi Telugu Akademi Award (1999)
- Award for outstanding service to literature and culture by Sri Annamacharya Project of North America, Chicago (SAPMA), USA (2001), and ‘Kala Ratna’ award by Govt. of Andhra Pradesh (2009)

Gopi has also served as an elected member of various literary bodies across India. Some of the most coveted positions include:

- Member of A.P. state Sahitya Akademi (1984)
- Telugu Advisory Board member, Sahitya Akademi, New Delhi (2002–03)
- Telugu Advisory Board member, National Book Trust of India, New Delhi (2006 onwards)
- Jury Member, Feature Films, Nandi Awards Committee A.P. Govt. (1996)
- Chairman, Jury, T.V. Nandi Awards Committee, A.P. Govt. (2011)
- Convener, Telugu Advisory Board and Member, Executive Council, Central Sahitya Akademi (2013-2017)

== Reception and influence ==
Gopi's literary essays are considered original and are widely quoted. His commentaries to Vemana’s poems are considered comprehensive and modern. His prolific columns in various newspapers and magazines on subjects such as literature and current affairs were very well received. He is an orator and much sought after Personality among Telugu Literary and cultural Organizations.

Gopi's extensive work on Vemana's poetry and his large poetry collection have been the subjects of various academic research.

=== Research on Gopi’s works ===
So far, 5 Ph.D.s and 4 M.Phils have been awarded in various universities for research work on Gopi's literature.

=== Books on Gopi’s works ===
- Gopi Kavithanusheelana - Articles by various critics (1998)
- Gopi Kavithanusheelana by Dr. Dwana Sastry (2001)
- Gopi Sahitya Vivechana - Collection of Essays by different scholars edited by Dr. S. Raghu (2010)
- Jala Deepika - Essays on Gopi’s Jala Geetham, Edited by N. Aruna (2008)

=== Translations of Gopi’s poetry ===
| Name of the book | Translated into | Translation name | Translated by |
|---|---|---|---|
| Jala Geetam | Hindi | Jalgeet | Prof. P. Manikyamba (Hyderabad) |
| Jala Geetam | English | Water Song | Prof. Alladi Uma, Prof. M. Sridhar (Hyderabad) |
| Jala Geetam | Marathi | Paan˜yaacha Gaan˜a | Niranjan Uzgare (Mumbai) |
| Jala Geetam | Gujarati | Jalgeeth | Ramanik Someshwar (Kutch) |
| Jala Geetam | Urdu | Nagma-e-Aab | Prof. Rahamat Yusuf Zai (Hyderabad) |
| Jala Geetam | Kannada | Jalageethe | Dr .Markandapuram Srinivasa (Bengaluru) |
| Jala Geetam | Malayalam | Jalageetham | L. R. Swamy (Vishakhapatnam) |
| Jala Geetam | Punjabi | Jala Geet | Swaranjit Savi (Ludhiana) |
| Jala Geetam | Persian | Nagma-e-Aab | Azeezuddin Ahmed Usmani (Delhi) |
| Jala Geetam | Sanskrit | Jala Geetham | M. Narayana Sharma (Hyderabad) |
| Jala Geetam | Odiya | Jala Gitto | Bangali Nanda (Bhuvaneshwar) |
| Naaneelu | Hindi | Nanhe Muktak | Prof. P. Vijaya Raghava Reddy (Hyderabad) |
| Naaneelu | Hindi | Gopi Ke Nenhe Muktak | Prof. B. Satyanarayana (Hyderabad) |
| Naaneelu | Marathi | Naaneelu - Muktak Manika | Suresh Ganga Khedkar (Hyderabad) |
| Naaneelu | English | Naaneelu - The Little Ones | P. Jayalakshmi (Hyderabad) |
| Naaneelu | Sanskrit | Naaneelu - Nava Mouktikah | Prof. M. Vijayasree (Hyderabad) |
| Naaneelu | Tamil | Naanigal | Dr. Nalimela Bhaskar (Karim Nagar) |
| Naaneelu | Kannada | Nanna Ninnau | Prof. K. G. Narayana Prasad (Hyderabad) |
| Naaneelu | Russian | Chikat Vorniye Miniyachuri | Prof. Vinay Totavar (Hyderabad) |
| Naaneelu | Gujarati | Naaneelu | Dr. Urvish Osavada (Junagadh) |
| Naaneelu | Urdu | Nanhi Nazmein | Prof. Fatima Begum (Parveen) (Hyderabad) |
| Naaneelu | Malayalam | Nanee Kavithakal | L. R. Swamy (Visakhapatnam) |
| Naaneelu | Punjabi | Nanhe Muktak | Dr. Chandar Trikha (Chandigarh) |
| Kalanni Nidraponivvanu | Hindi | Samayko Sone Nahidoonga | R. Shantha Sundari (Hyderabad) |
| Kalanni Nidraponivvanu | English | I Will Not Let Time Sleep | Dr. J. Bhagyalakshmi (Delhi) |
| Kalanni Nidraponivvanu | Gujarati | Samayne Suva Naahi Doun | Ramanik Someshwar (Kutch) |
| Kalanni Nidraponivvanu | Tamil | Kalathai Uranga Vidamatten | Dr. Shiripi Balasubramaniyam (Coimbatore) |
| Kalanni Nidraponivvanu | Malayalam | Samayate Urangan Anuvadhikkukayilla | L. R. Swamy (Vishakhapatnam) |
| Kalanni Nidraponivvanu | Marathi | Kaalala Zopu Denar Nahi | Dr. Kanchan Jatkar (Hyderabad) |
| Kalanni Nidraponivvanu | Konkani | Kallak Nihidunk Dinvchonam | Ramesh Veluskar (Goa) |
| Kalanni Nidraponivvanu | Dogri | Samen Gi De`ng Nie Souna | Prakash Premi (Uddhampur) |
| Kalanni Nidraponivvanu | Maithili | Samayken Suta Nai Debai | Kavita Kumari (Mumbai) |
| Kalanni Nidraponivvanu | Kannada | Kalavannu Nidrisalu Bidenu | Dr. Divakarla Rajeshwari (Bengaluru) |
| Kalanni Nidraponivvanu | Punjabi | Main Samey Nu Son Nahi Devange | Dr. Vanita (Delhi) |
| Kalanni Nidraponivvanu | Sanskrit | Kaalam Na Nidrapayaani | Prof. G.S.R. Krishnamurthy (Tirupathi) |
| Kalanni Nidraponivvanu | Sindhi | Waqt Khe Sumhan N Dedus | Srichand Dube (Junagadh) |
| Kalanni Nidraponivvanu | Urdu | Waqt Ko Sone Nahee Doonga | Prof. Rahamat Yusuf Zai (Hyderabad) |
| Kalanni Nidraponivvanu | Nepali | Samayalai Needavan Deenechaina | Siddharth Roy (Darjeeling) |
| Kalanni Nidraponivvanu | Odia | Samayaku Soibaku Debini | Bangali Nanda (Raipur) |
| Kalanni Nidraponivvanu | Assamese | Samay Tomak Shuboloy Nidyu | Purabi Bora (Guwahati) |
| Kalanni Nidraponivvanu | Meitei | Matambu Eina Toomhanloi | Salam Tomba (Imphal) |
| Kalanni Nidraponivvanu | Bengali | Somay Ke Ghamate Debona Aami | Mandara Mukhopadhyay (Kolkata) |
| Kalanni Nidraponivvanu | Kashmiri | Ba Dim-na Waqtas Thami Gatch-na | Ranjoor Tilgami (Telagam Pattan, Kashmir) |
| Kalanni Nidraponivvanu | Bodo | Bubli Khou Futuli | Uttam Chandrabrahma (Goneshpo Aathar, Karbee (Assam)) |
| Kalanni Nidraponivvanu | Santali | Oktobanjapid Ochhovaama | Damayanthi Bisra (Mayur Bhanj (Odisha)) |
| Kalanni Nidraponivvanu | Rajasthani | Mai Bagat Me Jakni Levanadoolaa | Dr. Chandra Prakash Deval (Ajmer, Rajasthan) |
| Other Translations | Urdu | Gopi Ki Sow Najme | Prof. Ghiyas Mateen (Hyderabad) |
| Other Translations | Hindi | Gopi Ki Kavita | R. Shantha Sundari (Hyderabad) |
| Other Translations | English | Another Sky | Prof. C. Vijayasree, Prof. Subbarayudu (Hyderabad) |
| Other Translations | Hindi | Goa, Mai Aur Samudr | R. Shantha Sundari (Hyderabad) |

== See also ==
- Naneelu
- N.Gopi's poetry is available to read online at https://www.kahaniya.com/ca6049608cfee0ed2e88c0822ceadc
