= Sprick =

Sprick is a surname. Notable people with this surname include:

- Gustav Sprick (1917–1941), German Luftwaffe fighter ace
- Matthieu Sprick (born 1981), French professional cyclist
- Daniel Sprick (born 1953), American artist
