= Samuel Squire Sprigge =

English physician, medical editor and writer (1860–1937)

Sir Samuel Squire Sprigge
- Born: Samuel Squire Sprigge; 22 June 1860; Watton, Norfolk
- Died: 17 June 1937 (aged 76); London
- Occupations: Physician and medical editor
- Known for: Editorship of The Lancet from 1909 to 1937

Sir Samuel Squire Sprigge FRCS FRCP (22 June 1860 – 17 June 1937) was an English physician, medical editor, and medical writer.

== Biography ==
After education at Uppingham School from 1873 to 1878, he matriculated on 1 October 1878 at Caius College, Cambridge, graduating there BA in 1882. After medical training at St George's Hospital he qualified MRCS in 1886 and graduated MB BChir from the University of Cambridge in 1887. (At St George's Hospital he was surgical assistant to Timothy Holmes.)

Sprigge was house surgeon to West London Hospital, house physician to the Brompton Hospital, and clinical assistant to the Children's Hospital, Great Ormond Street. He practised for sometime in Mayfair, London. In 1904 he graduated MA and MD from the University of Cambridge.

Sprigge's connexion with The Lancet began in 1903, and after a short period of probation he was appointed sub-editor of the journal. Dr Thomas Wakley, junior, the grandson of the founder of the paper, died in 1909, and Sprigge then became editor, a position he held with distinction until his death in 1937.

In 1911 Sprigge was president of the Society of Authors. During the early part of WWI, Sprigge, with Dr. H. A. Des Voeux, organised and administered the Belgian Doctors' and Pharmacists' Relief Fund. For this charitable work, Sprigge was awarded the Médaille du Roi Albert in 1919. In 1921 he was knighted. He was elected FRCS in 1921 and FRCP in 1927. In 1928 in Boston he delivered the Hunterian lecture to the American College of Surgeons.

He married twice: (1) in 1895 Beatrice, daughter of Sir Charles Moss, Chief Justice of Ontario; she died in 1903 leaving him with two children: Cecil Sprigge, financial editor of the Manchester Guardian, and Mrs Mark Napier (Elizabeth Sprigge, the novelist); (2) in 1905 Ethel Courselles, daughter of Major Charles Jones; she survived him with a daughter.

Squire Sprigge was a member of the United University Club and the Savile Club.

At the Savile Club he associated particularly with Edmund Gosse and William Hunt, the historian, and was on dining terms with the leaders of the "æsthetic" literary movement. He treasured also the friendship of Anthony Hope Hawkins and Rudyard Kipling, and, a few years later, that of Max Beerbohm, William Rothenstein, and ... Robert Ross.

== Selected publications ==
=== Articles ===
- "The Poisoning of the Future". The New Review. 9 (50): 45–55. July 1893.
- "Oliver Wendel Holmes and the doctrine of Semmelweis". Lancet. 2 (Part 1): 882. 18 September 1909. doi:10.1016/s0140-6736(01)38080-7.
- Sprigge, S. S. (8 October 1910). "An Address On Prizes and Performances Delivered at the Opening of the Medical Session at St. George's Hospital on October 1st". Br Med J. 2 (2597): 1024–1027. doi:10.1136/bmj.2.2597.1024. PMC 2336111. PMID 20765289.
- "Copyright and the Case of Coleridge Taylor". The English Review. 13: 446–453. February 1913.
- "Art and Medicine". The Burlington Magazine for Connoisseurs. 28 (154): 155–158. January 1916.
- "Art and Medicine (continuation)". The Burlington Magazine for Connoisseurs. 28 (155): 192+194–197+199. February 1916.
- "Art and Medicine (conclusion)". The Burlington Magazine for Connoisseurs. 28 (156): 222–224. March 1916.
- "The Outlook of Medical Practice". Medical Record. 96 (15): 622–624. 11 October 1919.
- Sprigge, S. (February 1928). "Medical Journalism". Glasgow Medical Journal. 109 (2): 110–119. PMC 5970349. PMID 30438321.

=== Books ===
- "The Society of French authors (La Société des gens de lettres) its foundation and its history". Society of authors. London: Pub. for the Incorporated society of authors, and sold by H. Glaisher. 1889.
- Methods of publishing: the cost of production. Literary property.4. London: Pub. for the Incorporated society of authors, by H. Glaisher. 1890. 2nd edition. 1892.
- The life and times of Thomas Wakley. London: Longmans, Green and co. 1897. re-issue. 1899.
- Odd issues. London: Leonard Smith. 1899.
- as editor: Autobiography of Sir Walter Besant. London. 1902.
- An industrious chevalier. London. 1902. 2nd edition. 1931.
- Medicine and the public. London: London : William Heinneman. 1905.
- Some considerations of medical education. London. 1910.
- Physic and fiction. London: Hodder & Stoughton. 1921.
- as editor: The conduct of medical practice. London. 1927.
- Grand curiosity as exemplified in the life of John Hunter, Hunterian lecture before the American College of Surgeons, Boston, October 1928.
