= Sylvia Sprigge =

British journalist and author

Sylvia Sprigge (1903–1966) was a British journalist and writer.

Sprigge and her husband Cecil Sprigge (1896–1959), a Berlin correspondent of The Times, were correspondents for English newspapers in Rome, including the Manchester Guardian from 1943 to 1953. She was also a correspondent in Berlin and authored several books.
