= Joshua Sprigg =

Joshua Sprigg or Sprigge (1618 in Banbury – 1684) was an English Independent theologian and preacher. He acted as chaplain to Sir Thomas Fairfax, general for the Parliamentarians, and wrote or co-wrote the 1647 book Anglia Rediviva, a history of the part played up to that time by Fairfax's army in the Wars of the Three Kingdoms.

He studied at New Inn Hall, Oxford, and took an M. A. at the University of Edinburgh. He then became a parish priest in London, at the church of St. Pancras, Soper Lane. He later was a Fellow of All Souls College, Oxford, imposed by Parliament after their victory.

Some contemporary scholarship also attributes to him the authorship of the anonymous pamphlet Ancient Bounds from 1645, a major work of the period on freedom of conscience; this had previously been thought to be from the pen of Francis Rous.

Sprigg is featured at the end of Rosemary Sutcliff's 1953 historical fiction novel Simon, where he is portrayed helping the wounded of both sides of the Battle of Torrington, and plays a pivotal role in connecting the story with a resolution for who blew up the church.
