= Burnett (surname) =

Burnett is a Scottish surname. It is derived from a nickname from the Old French burnete, brunette, which is a diminutive of brun meaning "brown", "dark brown", and in some cases perhaps a metonymic occupational name for a maker or seller of burnete, a dark brown woollen cloth.

== People with the surname ==
- A. J. Burnett (born 1977), American baseball player
- Alaina Burnett (born 1977), Canadian voice actor
- Alan Burnett (born 1950), American television writer-producer
- Alex Burnett (born 1987), baseball pitcher
- Alexander Burnett (disambiguation), several people

- Alexander Burnett of Leys (died 1619), Laird of Crathes Castle
- Alexander Burnett (politician) (born 1973), Member of the Scottish Parliament
- Alexander Burnett (musician), Australian singer, songwriter and music producer
- Sir Alexander Burnett, 2nd Baronet (died 1663) of the Burnett baronets
- Sir Alexander Burnett, 4th Baronet (died 1758) of the Burnett baronets
- Sir Alexander Burnett, 9th Baronet (1789–1856) of the Burnett baronets
- Sir Alexander Edwin Burnett, 14th Baronet (1881–1959) of the Burnett baronets

- Allan Burnett (1925–2007), Scottish anarchist activist
- Anne Valliant Burnett Tandy (1900–1980), American heiress
- Bill Burnett (1917–1994), South African archbishop
- Bobby Burnett (1943–2016), American football player
- Brian Burnett (1913–2011), British Royal Air Force officer
- Bryan Burnett, Scottish radio and TV presenter
- Calvin Burnett (disambiguation), several people

- Calvin Burnett (artist) (1921–2007), American artist and illustrator
- Calvin Burnett (Guyanese cricketer) (1954–2024), Guyanese cricketer
- Calvin Burnett (Scottish cricketer) (born 1990), Scottish cricketer

- Carol Burnett (born 1933), American comedian
- Charles Burnett (disambiguation)

- Charles Burnett of the Burnett baronets
- Charles Burnett III (died 2018), British land-speed record holder for steam driven vehicle
- Charles Burnett (British Army officer) (1843–1910), British Army general
- Charles Burnett (director) (born 1944), American film director
- Charles Burnett (officer of arms) (1940–2024), Scottish Officer of Arms
- Charles Burnett (politician) (1875–1947), New Zealand politician
- Charles Burnett (RAF officer) (1882–1945), Australian Chief of the Air Staff
- Charles Hiram Burnett Sr. (1847–1916), businessman, treasurer of Seattle

- Colby Burnett, teacher, American Jeopardy! contestant
- Cynthia S. Burnett (1840–1932), American educator, lecturer, reformer, editor
- David Burnett (photojournalist) (born 1946), American photojournalist
- David Burnett (politician) (born 1942 or 1943), Arkansas politician and former judge
- Deontay Burnett (born 1997), American football player
- Dick Burnett (musician) (1883–1977), American country singer
- Emily Burnett (born 1997), Welsh actress
- Erin Burnett (born 1976), American financial analyst and reporter
- Frances Hodgson Burnett (1849–1924), English author born Frances Eliza Hodgson
- Frank Burnett (1931–2020), American racing driver
- Garrett Burnett (1975–2022), Canadian ice hockey player
- George Burnett (disambiguation)

- George Burnett (ice hockey) (born 1962), National Hockey League coach
- George Burnett (officer of arms) (1822–1890), Lord Lyon King of Arms
- George Burnett (writer) (1776?–1811), English nonconformist minister and writer
- George Burnett Barton (1836–1901), Australian lawyer
- George H. Burnett (1853–1927), Oregon Supreme Court Chief Justice
- George Murray Burnett (1921–1980), mathematician and chemist
- George Ritter Burnett (1858–1908), US Army officer

- Georgina Burnett (born 1978), Australian-born British TV presenter
- Gilbert Thomas Burnett (1800–1835) British botanist
- Graham Burnett (born 1965), New Zealand cricketer
- Hamilton S. Burnett (1895–1973), justice of the Tennessee Supreme Court
- Henry Cornelius Burnett (1825–1866) American politician
- Henry John Burnett (1942–1963), last man hanged in Scotland
- Henry Lawrence Burnett (1838–1916), lawyer and US civil war officer
- Howard Burnett (disambiguation), several people

- Howard J. Burnett (1929–2019), American college president
- Howard Burnett (athlete) (born 1961), Jamaica

- Hugh Burnett (1918–1991), African-Canadian civil rights leader
- Hugh Burnett (producer) (1924–2011), British TV producer and cartoonist
- Ian Burnett, Baron Burnett of Maldon (born 1958), Lord Chief Justice of England & Wales
- Ivy Compton-Burnett (1884–1969), English novelist
- Jamie Burnett (born 1975), Scottish snooker player
- Jason Burnett (born 1986), Canadian gymnast
- Jean L. Burnett (1871–1907), New York politician
- Jesse Burnett (born 1946) American boxer
- John Burnett (disambiguation), several people

- John Burnett, Baron Burnett (born 1945), British politician, MP
- John Burnett (advocate) (c. 1764–1810), Scottish judge
- John Burnett (colonial secretary) (1781–1860), of Van Diemens Land
- John Burnett (cricketer) (1840–1878), English cricketer
- John Burnett (footballer) (1939–2021), England
- John Burnett (historian) (1925–2006), English social historian
- John Burnett (judge) (1831–1890), US, on Oregon Supreme Court
- John Burnett (merchant) (1729–1784), Aberdeen merchant
- John Burnett (priest) (fl. 1955–1969), Australian Anglican priest
- John Burnett (rugby league) (1935–2022), English rugby player
- John Burnett (trade unionist) (1842–1914), British trade unionist and civil servant
- John George Burnett (1876–1962), British politician, MP
- John Harrison Burnett (1922–2007), British botanist and mycologist
- John L. Burnett (1854–1919), U.S. Representative from Alabama
- John Napier Burnett (1899–1989), Canadian educator

- Johnny Burnett (baseball) (1904–1959), American baseball player
- Joseph Burnett (1899–1941), Australian naval officer
- Justin Burnett (born 1973), American film composer
- Kaelin Burnett (born 1989), American football player
- Karl Burnett (born 1976), New Zealand actor
- Kevin Burnett (born 1982), American football player
- Leo Burnett (1891–1971), American advertising executive
- Margaret Burnett (born 1949), American computer scientist
- Mark Burnett (born 1960), British-born American TV producer
- Maud Burnett (1863–1950), English politician
- Max Burnett (born 1969), American TV & film writer, director and producer
- McKinley Burnett (1897–1968), American school desegregation pioneer
- Mikey Burnett (born 1974), American mixed martial artist
- Nastassja Burnett (born 1992), Italian tennis player
- O. H. Burnett (1872–1906), American politician and lawyer
- Paul Burnett (1943), English radio disc jockey
- Peter Hardeman Burnett (1807–1895), first elected governor of California
- Richard Burnett, Canadian writer, editor, journalist and columnist
- Richie Burnett (born 1967), Welsh professional darts player
- Rob Burnett (American football) (born 1967), American football player
- Rob Burnett (producer) (born 1962) and writer
- Samuel Burk Burnett (1849–1922), Texas cattleman and rancher
- Sean Burnett (born 1982), American baseball player
- Shawn Burnett (born 2003), Canadian sledge hockey player
- Simon Burnett (born 1983), British swimmer
- Stefan Corbin Burnett, aka MC Ride, singer
- Suzanne Rochon-Burnett (1935–2006), Canadian businesswoman
- T Bone Burnett (born 1948), born Joseph Henry Burnett, American singer songwriter
- Thomas Stuart Burnett (1853–1888), Scottish sculptor
- Sir Thomas Burnett, 3rd Baronet (1658–1714)
- Tolly Burnett (1923–1993), English cricketer
- Tom Burnett (1963–2001), American COO
- Walter Burnett Jr. (born 1963), American politician
- Wayne Burnett (born 1971), English football player and manager
- Webbie Burnett (born 1967), American football player
- William Burnett (disambiguation)

- William Burnett (physician) (1779–1861), British physician
- William Burnett (preacher), college president
- William Farquharson Burnett (c. 1837–1863), Royal Navy officer
- W. R. Burnett (William Riley Burnett, 1899–1982), American novelist and screenwriter

== In fiction ==
- Bronc Burnett, character in Wilfred McCormick's boys' books

== See also ==
- Burnet (surname)
- House of Burnett
- Brown (surname), a perhaps related surname
