= 1939 in association football =

The following are the football (soccer) events of the year 1939 throughout the world.

== Events ==
Many football leagues throughout Europe are suspended or abandoned following the start of the Second World War.

== Winners club national championship ==
- Argentina: Independiente
- France: FC Sète
- Germany: FC Schalke 04
- Hungary: Újpest FC
- Iceland: Fram
- Italy: [[Bologna F.C.}Bologna]]
- Netherlands: Ajax Amsterdam
- Poland - not finished due to Second World War. As for August 31, 1939, the leading team was Ruch Chorzów
- Romania: Venus București
- Scotland: Rangers
- Soviet Union: see 1939 in Soviet football

== International tournaments ==
- 1939 British Home Championship (October 8, 1938 – April 15, 1939)

Shared by England, Wales and Scotland

- 1939 South American Championship (January 15, 1939 – February 12, 1939)

Peru

== Movies ==
- The Arsenal Stadium Mystery (UK)

== Births ==
- January 6: Valeri Lobanovsky, Soviet/Ukrainian international footballer and coach (died 2002)
- January 25: Horst Nemec, Austrian international footballer (died 1984)
- January 29: Peter Laverick, English professional footballer (died 2013)
- January 30: Jovan Miladinović, Serbian footballer (died 1982)
- February 3: Dezső Novák, Hungarian international footballer (died 2014)
- February 10: Emilio Álvarez, Uruguayan footballer (died 2010)
- February 12: Walter Glechner, Austrian international footballer (died 2015)
- February 22: Leif Iwarsson, Swedish footballer
- February 27: José Cardona, Honduran international footballer (died 2013)
- March 8: Paride Tumburus, Italian international footballer (died 2015)
- March 17: Giovanni Trapattoni, Italian international footballer and coach
- March 31: Karl-Heinz Schnellinger, German footballer
- April 23: Fritz Pott, German international footballer and coach (died 2015)
- April 25
  - Ahmad Basri Akil, Malaysian football manager (died 2008)
  - Tarcisio Burgnich, Italian international footballer (died 2021)
- April 30: Tony Bratley, English retired professional footballer
- June 23: Syed Shahid Hakim, Indian former Olympic footballer and manager (died 2021)
- June 24: John Burnett, English professional footballer (died 2021)
- June 27: Ilija Dimovski, Macedonian footballer and manager
- July 1: Graham Beighton, English former professional footballer
- July 3: Brian Bades, English footballer
- July 4: Kim Bong-hwan, North Korean footballer
- July 7: Armand Sahadewsing, Surinamese football player and manager
- July 10: Reg Stratton, English footballer (died 2018)
- July 11: Mick Brown, England football scout
- July 13: John Danielsen, Danish midfielder
- July 18: Eduard Mudrik, Soviet Russian international footballer (died 2017)
- July 21
  - Helmut Haller, German international footballer (died 2012)
  - Bogusław Hajdas, Polish footballer, coach
- August 7: Willie Penman, Scottish footballer (died 2017)
- September 7: Clive Bircham, English professional footballer (died 2020)
- October 14: Ramón Barreto, Uruguayan football referee (died 2015)
- October 27: Marino Perani, Italian international footballer (died 2017)
- November 3: Frits Flinkevleugel, Dutch international footballer (died 2020)
- December 26: Malcolm Bogie, Scottish professional footballer

== Deaths ==
- February 13 - Caius Welcker, Dutch international footballer (born 1885)
- March 29 – Fausto dos Santos, Brazilian midfielder, Brazilian squad member at the 1930 FIFA World Cup and active player of Flamengo. (34; tuberculosis)
- October 20 - Otto Siffling, German international footballer (born 1912)
