= Burnett =

Burnett may refer to:

== Places ==
Antarctica

- Burnett Island, an island in the Swain Islands

Australia

- Burnett County, New South Wales, a cadastral division
- The Burnett River in Queensland
- Burnett Heads, Queensland
- Shire of Burnett, a former local government area in Queensland
- Electoral district of Burnett, Queensland, Australia

Canada

- Burnett Bay, Northwest Territoes
- Burnett Inlet, Nunavut

United Kingdom

- Burnett, Somerset, England

United States

- Burnett, Illinois, an unincorporated community
- Burnett, Indiana, an unincorporated town
- Burnett, Minnesota, an unincorporated community
- Burnett, Washington, an unincorporated community
- Burnett, Wisconsin, a town
- Burnett (CDP), Wisconsin, an unincorporated census-designated place
- Burnett County, Wisconsin
- Burnett Township (disambiguation)

== People ==
- Burnett (surname), people whose last name is Burnett
- Clan Burnett, a Scottish clan
- Burnett Baronets, one Nova Scotia baronetcy and one UK baronetcy

== Other uses ==
- 5798 Burnett, an asteroid

== See also ==
- Burnet (disambiguation)
- Burnette (disambiguation)
- Justice Burnett (disambiguation)
- , including people with first name Burnett
