= John Burnett =

John Burnett may refer to:

== Law ==
- John Burnett (advocate) (c. 1764–1810), Scottish advocate and judge
- John Burnett (judge) (1831–1890), American judge on the Oregon Supreme Court

== Politics ==
- John Burnett (colonial secretary) (1781–1860), colonial secretary of Van Diemens Land
- John Burnett (trade unionist) (1842–1914), British trade unionist and civil servant
- John George Burnett (1876–1962), British politician, Member of Parliament
- John Burnett, Baron Burnett (born 1945), British politician, Member of Parliament
- John L. Burnett (1854–1919), U.S. Representative from Alabama
- John Burnett (Missouri politician)

== Sports ==
- John Burnett (cricketer) (1840–1878), English cricketer
- Johnny Burnett (baseball) (1904–1957), American baseball player
- John Burnett (footballer) (born 1939), English association (soccer) footballer
- John Burnett (rugby league) (1935–2022), English rugby league footballer who played in the 1950s and 1960s

== Other ==
- John Burnett (merchant) (1729–1784), Aberdeen merchant
- John Napier Burnett (1899–1989), Canadian educator
- John Harrison Burnett (1922–2007), British botanist and mycologist
- John Burnett (historian) (1925–2006), English social historian
- John Burnett (priest) (fl. 1955–1969), Australian Anglican priest
- John F. Burnett, American film editor

== See also ==
- John Burnet (disambiguation)
- Johnny Burnette (1934–1964), musician
