= Franklin Building =

Franklin Building may refer to:

- Franklin Building (Chicago) a Printer's Row building designed by George C. Nimmons with mural and painted tile artworks by Oskar Gross
- Franklin Building in Brooklyn, New York designed by the Parfitt Brothers
- Franklin Exchange Building in Tampa, Florida
- Franklin College Building No. 5 in New Athens, Ohio
