= Calvin Burnett =

Calvin Burnett may refer to:

- Calvin Burnett (artist) (1921–2007), American artist and illustrator
- Calvin Burnett (Guyanese cricketer) (born 1954), Guyanese cricketer
- Calvin Burnett (Scottish cricketer) (born 1990), Scottish cricketer
