= Wheatley Pottery Company =

American ceramics manufacturer

Wheatley Pottery Company produced ornamental vases, lamps, and ceramic tile in Cincinnati, Ohio. Their autumn leaf tiles were used on the Franklin Building, along Printer's Row in Chicago. The MET has an earthenware umbrella stand from the company in its collection.

== History ==
Thomas J. Wheatley worked in the Coultry pottery studio beginning in 1879 with M. Louise McLaughlin of Rookwood Pottery. He started T.J. Wheatley & Co. in Cincinnati in 1880. One of the firm's vases was exhibited as part of a Morse Museum show. He helped form the Cincinnati Art Pottery Company where he worked until 1882. Wheatley opened a studio in Cincinnati and a factory in Covington Kentucky near the crossing to Cincinnati but it closed after flooding. and Wheatley worked for Weller Pottery in Zanesville, Ohio from 1897 to 1900.

He founded Wheatley Pottery Company in 1903 in Cincinnati. The firm suffered a fire in 1910. It was purchased by the Cambridge Tile Manufacturing Company in 1927. The company is known for its use of relief in its decorative pottery and green, blue, and yellow glazes. Its vases have appeared on Antiques Roadshow. Wheatley imitated the work of other artists including Limoges and Grueby Faience Company.

Wheatley patented a slip process developed by McLaughlin. It was disputed and he backed down from attempting to enforce it.

Isaac Kahn was a partner in the business.

In 1921, the company moved from its plant at 4600 Eastern Avenue. The firm also had a showroom at 561 Reading Road. A fountain and some tilework was salvaged from it when it was demolished.

One of their catalogues featured a swastika tile design in the 1920s.
