= Burtnett =

Burtnett is a surname. Notable people with the surname include:

- Earl Burtnett (1896–1936), American bandleader, songwriter, and pianist
- Leon Burtnett (1943–2021), American football coach
- Wellington Burtnett (1930–2013), American ice hockey player

== See also ==
- Burnett (surname)
