= Edwin Nevin =

American academic (1814-1889)

Edwin Henry Nevin
- Born: May 9, 1814; Shippensburg, Pennsylvania
- Died: June 2, 1889 (aged 75); Philadelphia, Pennsylvania
- Education: Jefferson College
- Spouse: Ruth C. Little

Ecclesiastical career
- Offices held: President of Franklin College

Edwin Henry Nevin (May 9, 1814 in Shippensburg, Pennsylvania – June 2, 1889 in Philadelphia, Pennsylvania) was a President of Franklin College in New Athens, Ohio, serving from 1840 to 1845.

Academic offices
Preceded by William Burnett	President of Franklin College; 1840–1845	Succeeded by Alexander D. Clark
