= Bernette =

Bernette is both a feminine given name and a surname. Notable people with the name include:

== Given name ==
- Bernette Beyers (born 1992), South African track cyclist
- Bernette Ford (1950–2021), American author, editor and publisher
- Bernette Joshua Johnson (born 1943), American lawyer, chief justice of the Louisiana Supreme Court (2013–2020)

== Surname ==
- Sheila Bernette (1931–2026), English singer and actress
- Yara Bernette (1920–2002), Brazilian classical pianist

== See also ==
- Burnette, people with this surname
