= Bratley =

Bratley is an English surname. Notable persons with this name include:

- George Bratley (1909–1978), English footballer
- Len Bratley (rugby league) (1914–1974), English professional rugby league footballer
- Philip Bratley (1880–1962), English footballer
- Tony Bratley (born 1939), English footballer
