= Burkette =

Burkette is a surname. Notable people with the surname include:

- David Burkette, American politician
- Bill Burkette, member of The Vogues

== See also ==
- Burnette
