= Burnet =

Burnet may refer to:

== Life forms ==
- Burnet moth, the Zygaenidae family of diurnal moths
  - Six-spot burnet (Z. filipendulae), a red-spotted species endemic to Europe and Anatolia
- Burnet (plant), the perennial genus Sanguisorba
  - Salad burnet (S. minor), a herb with edible, ferny leaves
- Burnet saxifrage or "lesser burnet", an unrelated plant species of similar appearance
- Acaena, a herb genus including southern South America's "greater burnet" and "lesser burnet"

== Places ==
- Burnet, Texas, United States
  - Burnet County, Texas

== Other uses ==
- HMS Burnet (K348), a British-commissioned warship in WWII
- Professor Burnet, a Pokémon character

== People named Burnet ==
- Burnet (surname), people with the surname
- Burnet Reading (1749–1838), English engraver

== See also ==
- Burnett (disambiguation)
- Burnette (disambiguation)
