= Senator Burnett =

Senator Burnett may refer to:

- David Burnett (politician) (born 1942 or 1943), Arkansas State Senate
- Henry Cornelius Burnett (1825-1866), Confederate States Senator from Kentucky from 1862 to 1865
- John Burnett (judge) (1831–1890), Oregon State Senate
- O. H. Burnett (1872–1906), Illinois State Senate

== See also ==
- Jacob Burnet (1770–1853), U.S. Senator from Ohio
