= Charlie Barnett =

Charlie Barnett may refer to:

- Charles John Barnett (1790–1856), British Army officer and diplomat
- Charles James Barnett (1796–1882), English politician and cricketer
- Charlie Barnett (cricketer) (Charles John Barnett, 1910–1993), English cricketer
- Charles Barnett (cricketer, born 1884) (1884–1962), English cricketer who played for Gloucestershire
- Charlie Barnett (footballer) (born 1988), English football player
- Charlie Barnett (comedian) (1954–1996), American actor and comedian
- Charlie Barnett (actor) (born 1988), American actor
- Charles Zachary Barnett (c. 1813–1849), English librettist and playwright
- Charlie Barnet (1913–1991), American jazz saxophonist, composer and bandleader

== See also ==
- Barnett (surname)
- Charles Burnett (disambiguation)
