= Palmolive Building =

Skyscraper in Chicago, Illinois

- U.S. National Register of Historic Places
- Chicago Landmark
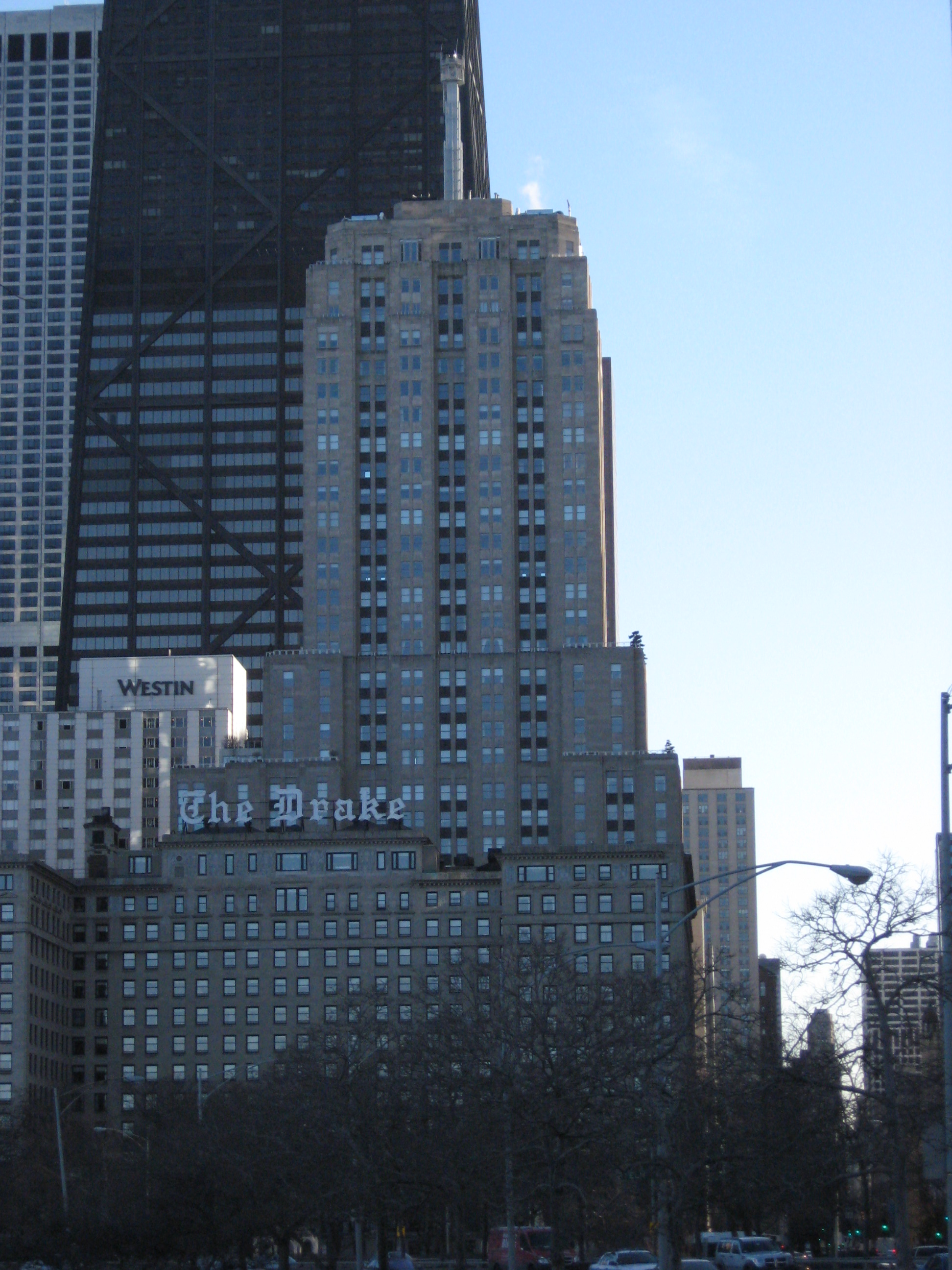
- The Palmolive Building

- Location within Chicago metropolitan area Location within Illinois Location within the United States
- Location: 919 N Michigan Avenue, Chicago, IL 60611, US
- Coordinates: 41°53′59.41″N 87°37′25.94″W
- Built: 1929
- Architect: Holabird & Root
- Architectural style: Art Deco
- NRHP reference No.: 03000784

Significant dates
- Added to NRHP: August 21, 2003
- Designated CHICL: February 16, 2000

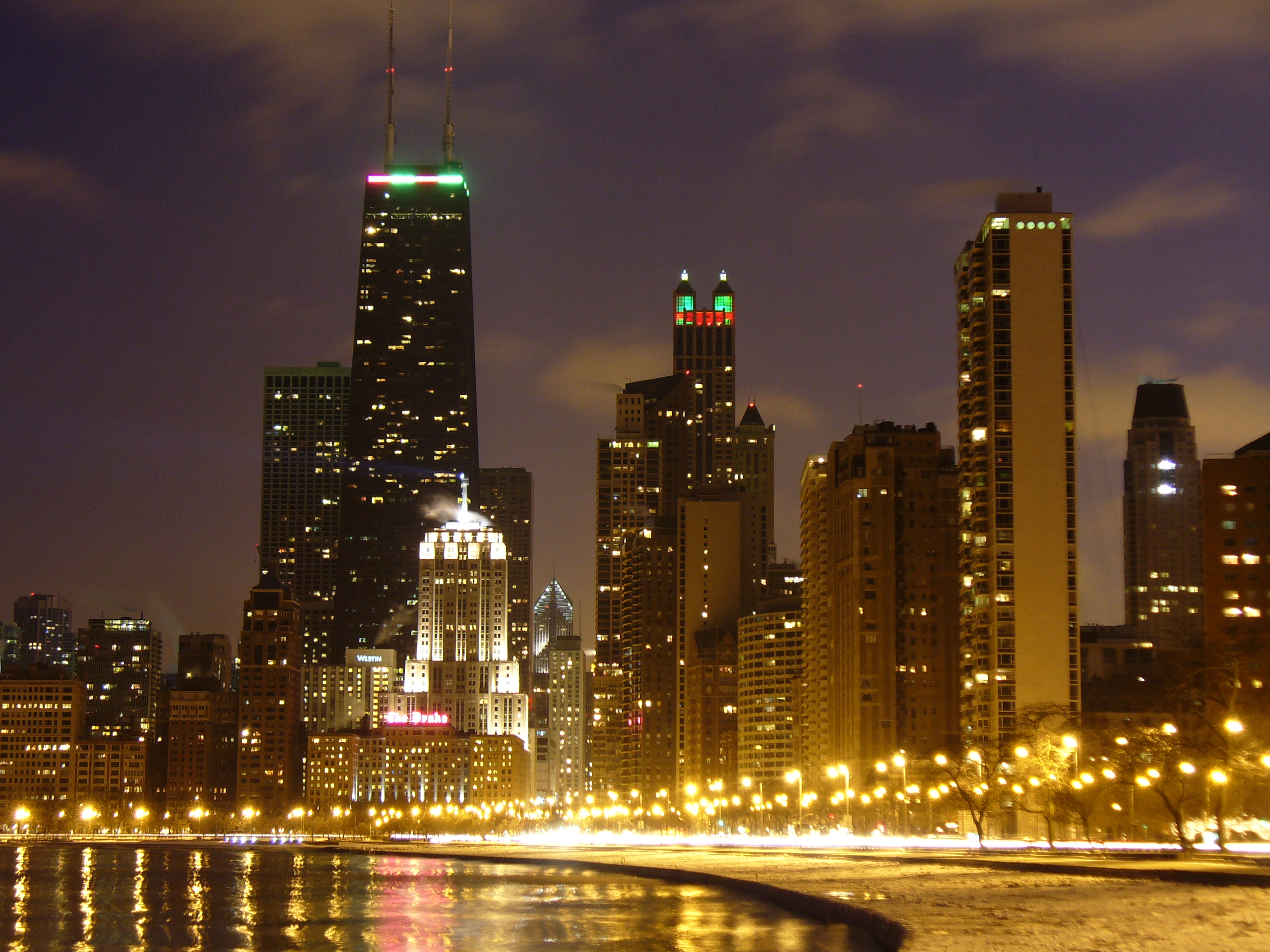
The Lindbergh Beacon atop the Palmolive Building can be clearly seen at night.

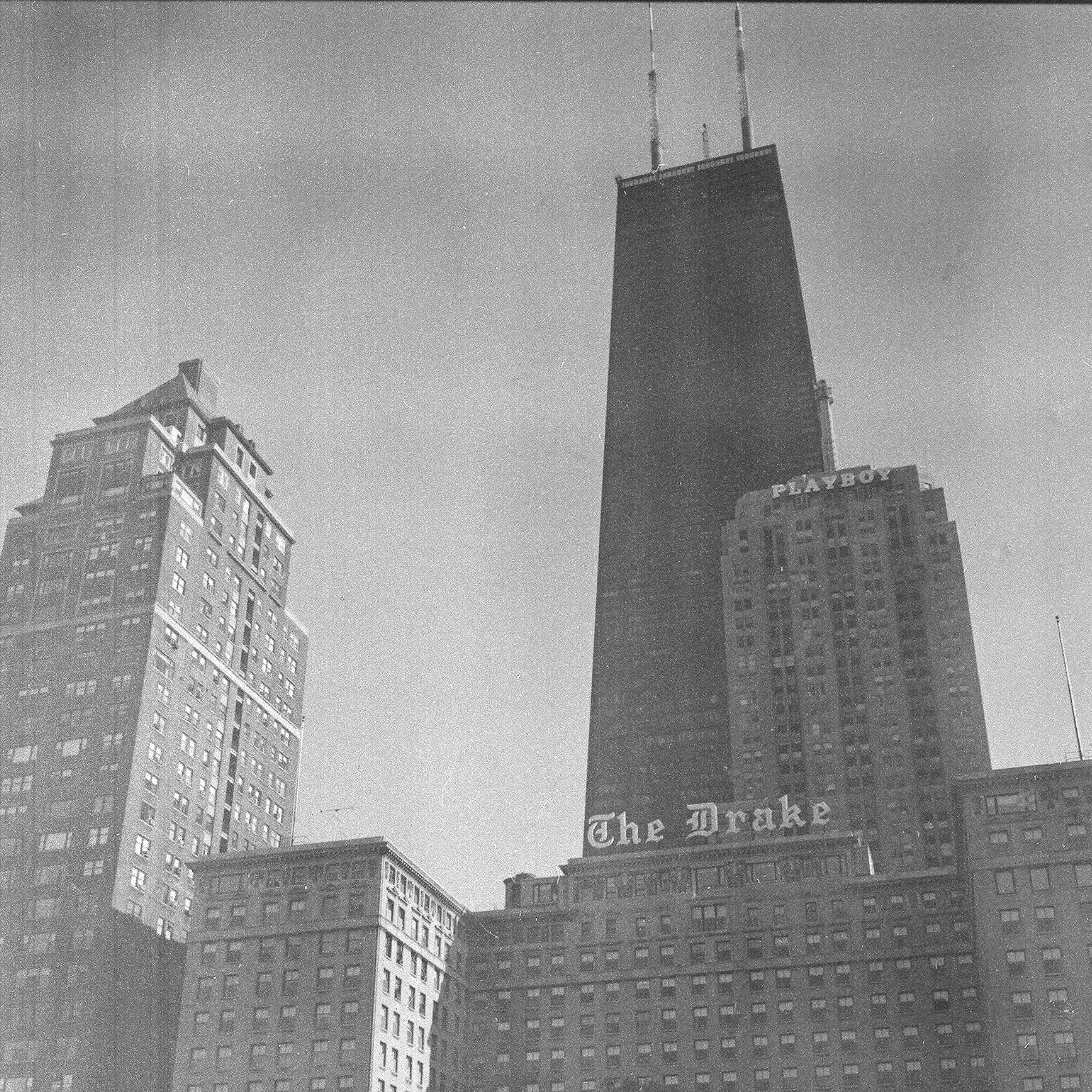
Building with the Playboy name on top, circa 1970

The Palmolive Building, formerly the Playboy Building, is a 37-story Art Deco building at 919 N. Michigan Avenue in Chicago, Illinois.

== History ==
Designed by Holabird & Root, the Palmolive Building was completed in 1929 as the home of the Colgate-Palmolive-Peet Company.

Playboy Enterprises purchased the leasehold in 1965 and the structure was renamed the Playboy Building. It was home to the editorial and business offices of Playboy magazine until 1989, when Playboy moved its offices to 680 N Lake Shore Drive. Playboy had sold the leasehold in 1980 and signed a 10-year lease that expired in 1990. The new leaseholder renamed the building 919 North Michigan Avenue.

During the time that Playboy was in the building, the word P-L-A-Y-B-O-Y was spelled out in 9-foot (2.7 m) illuminated letters on the north and south roofline. The building was designated a Chicago Landmark in 2000, and it was added to the federal National Register of Historic Places in 2003.

In 2001, the building was sold to developer Draper and Kramer who, with Booth Hansen Architects, converted it to residential use, with the first two floors dedicated to upscale office and retail space. High-end condos make up the rest of the building. The new owners restored the building's name to the Palmolive Building. The business address remains 919 North Michigan Avenue; however, the residential address is 159 East Walton Place. Notable residents of the building include Vince Vaughn, who bought a 12,000-square-foot (1,100 m^{2}) triplex penthouse encompassing the 35th, 36th and 37th floors for $12 million. (Note: equivalent to $19.2 million in 2025.) In February 2013, Vaughn offered the penthouse for sale as a pocket listing for $24.9 million. (Note: equivalent to $34.4 million in 2025.) However, after multiple price cuts he chose in May 2016 to divide the unit in two, offering one for $8.5 million, (Note: equivalent to $11.4 million in 2025.) and the other smaller unit for $4.2 million. (Note: equivalent to $5.63 million in 2025.)

== Lindbergh Beacon ==
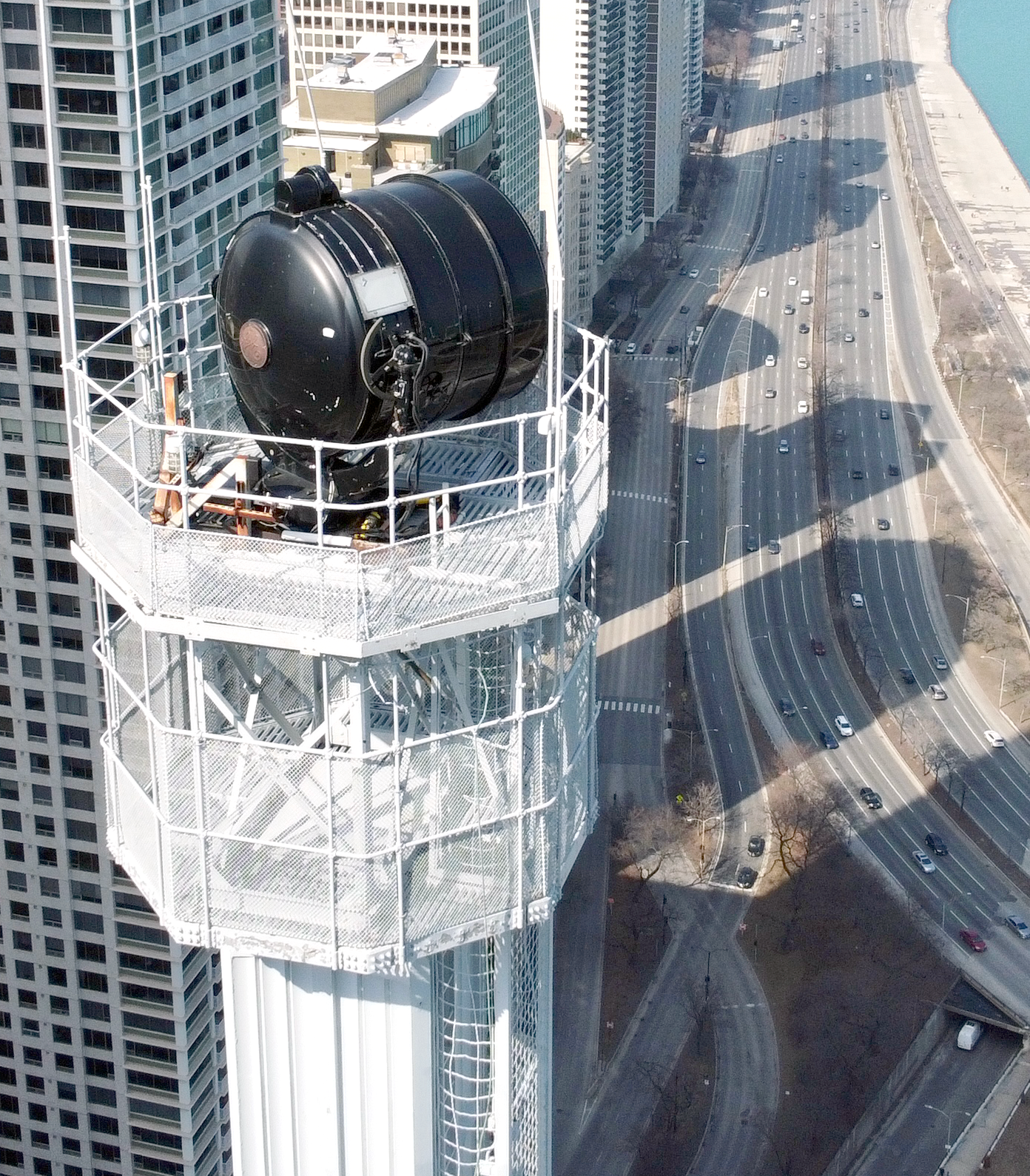
Lindbergh Beacon atop the Palmolive Building in Chicago

A beacon named for the aviator Charles Lindbergh was added to the building in 1930. It rotated a full 360 degrees and was intended to help guide airplanes safely to Midway Airport. The beacon beamed for several decades, and ceased operation in 1981 following complaints from residents of nearby buildings.

== See also ==
- Chicago architecture
- List of tallest buildings in Chicago
