= Franklin College (New Athens, Ohio) =

Coordinates: 40°11′14″N 80°59′46″W

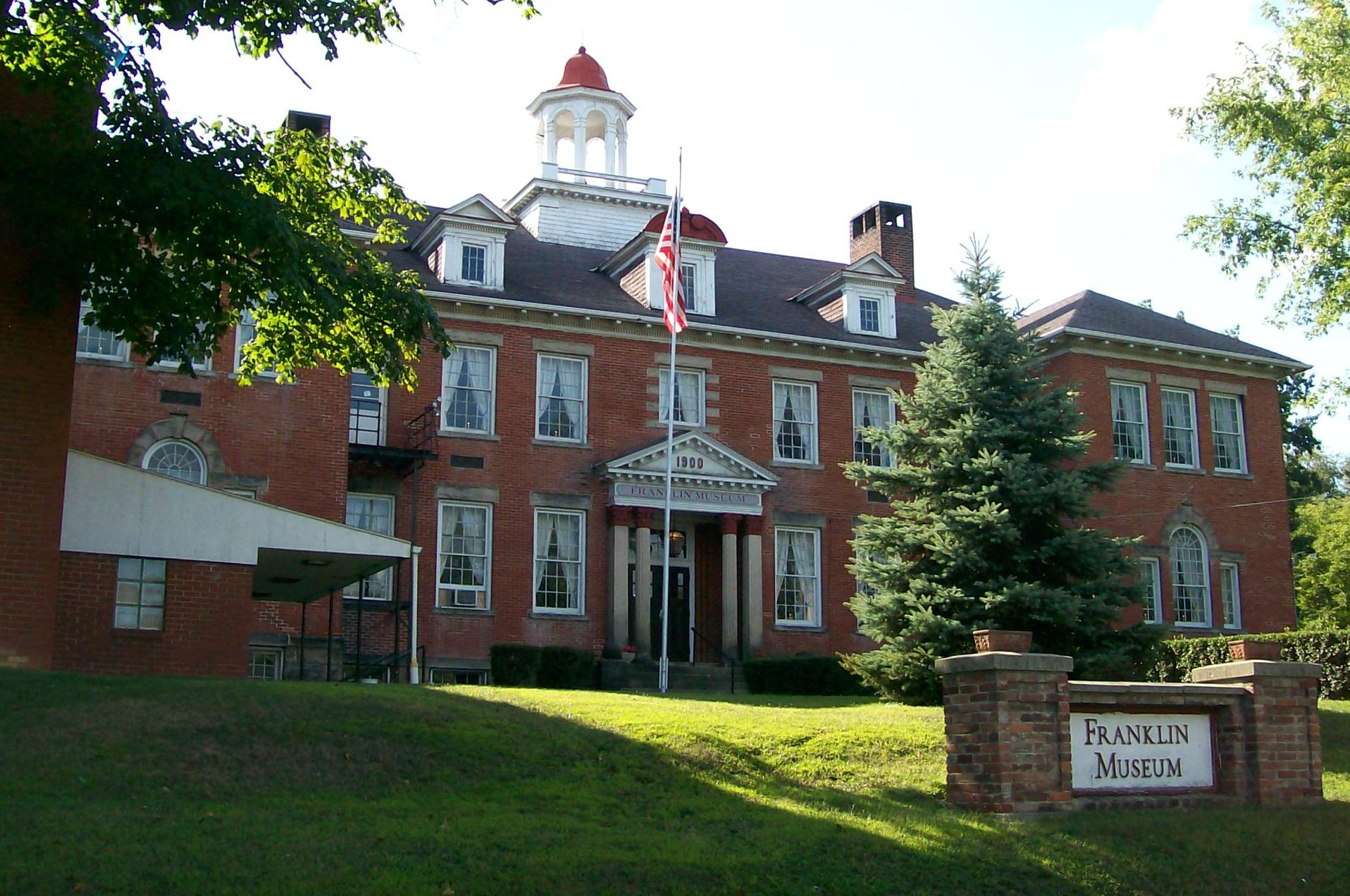
- Type: Private, Coed
- Active: 1818–1919
- Affiliations: Presbyterian church
- Location: New Athens, OH, USA

Franklin College (founded 1818) was a college in New Athens, Ohio, founded by abolitionist John Walker (1786–1845), a Presbyterian minister in Pennsylvania and Ohio. The college was called Alma College from 1818 until 1825, when the name was changed to Franklin College. Classes were suspended during the Civil War after most of the student body enlisted for military service, but the college was revived in 1867 with 40 students. The college ceased operation in 1919, and became associated with Muskingum College until 1927. The college building houses the Franklin Museum which showcases the span of the college and its history.

Over the course of over 100 years, the college was key in the education of two governors, eight U.S. Senators, and nine U.S. Congressmen and twenty state legislators. The college also graduated Titus Basfield, an African-American student and former slave, as well as several prominent women. While at Franklin College, Basfield became close friends with classmate John Armor Bingham, who later became primary author of the 14th Amendment to the Constitution and the longest-serving chief American diplomat in Japan, 1873–1885.

== List of presidents ==
- Rev. William McMillan, 1825–1832
- Rev. Richard Campbell, 1832–1835
- Rev. Johnson Welsh, 1835–1836
- Rev. Dr. Joseph Smith, 1837–1838
- Rev. Jacob Coon, (pro term), 1838–1839
- Rev. William Burnett, 1839–1840
- Rev. Edwin H. Nevin, 1840–1845
- Rev. Dr. Alexander D. Clark, 1845–1861
- Presidency Vacant. Dr. William Wishart, vice-president, 1861–1867
- Rev. R. G. Campbell, 1867–1871
- Dr. Andrew F. Ross, 1871–1877
- Rev. Dr. George C. Vincent, 1877–1884
- Dr. William Brinkerhoff, 1884–1885
- Rev. Mr. Black, 1885–1886
- Rev. William Asbury Williams, 1886-1901

== See also ==
- Franklin College Building No. 5
- John Bingham
- William McMillan (college president)
