= John Burnet =

John Burnet may refer to:

- John Burnet (MP) (by 1527–57/59), MP for Arundel
- John Burnet (painter) (1781–1868), Scottish engraver and painter
- John Burnet (abolitionist) (1789–1862), pastor in Camberwell
- John Burnet (architect) (1814–1901), Scottish architect
- John James Burnet (1857–1938), architect
- John Burnet (classicist) (1863–1928), Scottish classicist who wrote Early Greek Philosophy

== See also ==
- John Burnett (disambiguation)
- Johnny Burnette (1934–1964), musician
