= Charles Burnett =

Charles Burnett may refer to:

- Charles Burnett (director) (born 1944), American film director
- Charles Burnett (officer of arms) (1940–2024), Scottish Officer of Arms
- Charles Burnett (RAF officer) (1882–1945), Royal Air Force officer and Australian Chief of the Air Staff
- Charles Hiram Burnett Sr. (1847–1916), treasurer of the city of Seattle and businessman
- Charles Burnett (politician) (1875–1947), New Zealand politician
- Charles Burnett (British Army officer) (1843–1910), British Army general
- Charles Burnett of the Burnett baronets
- Charles Burnett III (died 2018), British land-speed record holder for steam driven vehicle

== See also ==
- Burnett (surname)
- Charlie Barnett (disambiguation)
