= William Burnett =

William Burnett may refer to:

- William Burnett (physician) (1779–1861), British physician
- William Burnett (preacher) (1808–?), president of Franklin College, New Athens, Ohio
- William Burnett mayor and politician from New Zealand, see Mayor of Dunedin
- W. R. Burnett (William Riley Burnett, 1899–1982), American novelist and screenwriter
- William Farquharson Burnett (c. 1837–1863), senior officer in the Royal Navy

== See also ==
- William Burnet (disambiguation)
- Billy Burnette (b. 1953), American guitarist
