= Burnet (surname) =

Burnet is a surname. Notable people with the surname include:

- Alastair Burnet (1928–2013), British journalist
- Alexander Burnet (1615–1684), Scottish clergyman
- David G. Burnet (1788–1870), president of the Republic of Texas
- David Burnet (Quebec politician) (c. 1803–1853), businessman and political figure in Lower Canada
- Frank Macfarlane Burnet (1895–1985), Australian biologist
- Gilbert Burnet (1643–1715), Scottish historian and Anglican bishop
- Guy Burnet (born 1983), English film, television and theatre actor
- Hannah Este Burnet (1800–1858), first lady of the Republic of Texas
- Helen Burnet, Tasmanian politician
- Isaac G. Burnet (1784–1856), American politician from Ohio
- Jacob Burnet (1770–1853), American jurist and statesman from Ohio
- Jean Burnet (1920–2009), Canadian academic specializing in ethnic studies
- John Burnet (architect) (1814–1901), Scottish architect
- John Burnet (classicist) (1863–1928), Scottish classicist
- John Burnet (painter) (1781 or 1784–1868), Scottish engraver and painter
- John James Burnet (1857–1938), Scottish architect
- Lorenzo Burnet (born 1991), Dutch footballer
- Noel Burnet (1904–1953), Australian koala expert
- Robert Burnet, Lord Crimond (1592–1661), Scottish advocate and judge
- Ronnie Burnet (1918–1999), English cricketer
- Thomas Burnet (several people)
- William Burnet (1688–1729), British colonial administrator
- William Burnet (1730–1791), American physician and political leader

== See also ==
- Burnett (surname)
