= William A. Williams (creationist) =

American Presbyterian clergyman and creationist writer

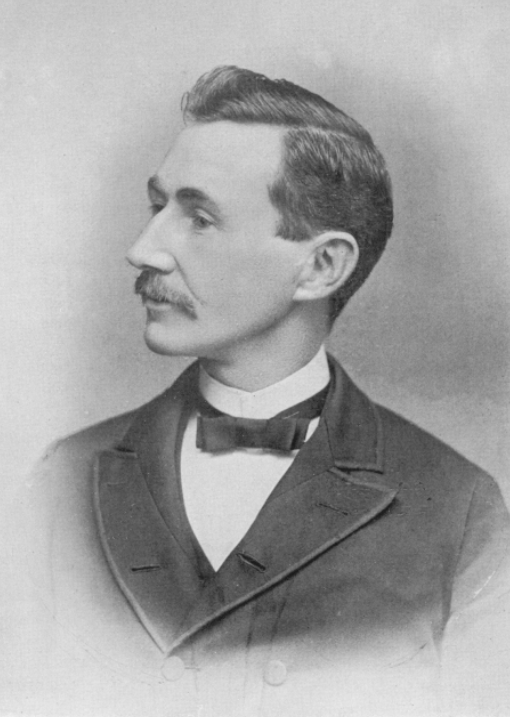
- Born: William Asbury Williams; May 30, 1854; Beallsville, Ohio, U.S.
- Died: May 6, 1938 (aged 83); Camden, New Jersey, U.S.
- Occupations: Clergyman, writer
- Spouse: Mary Elizabeth Lanning (m. 1877)
- Children: 3

William Asbury Williams D.D. (May 30, 1854 – May 6, 1938) was an American Presbyterian clergyman and creationist writer.

== Biography ==
Williams was born in Beallsville, Ohio. He was the son of Elam Williams and Elizabeth Sarah McKitrick. He graduated from Franklin College in 1876 and Western Theological Seminary in 1880. He obtained his A. M. in 1879 and a Doctor of Divinity degree from Scio College in 1888.

In 1885, he was ordained into the Presbyterian ministry. He was Professor of Greek and Hebrew at Franklin College (1880–1887) and served as President (1887–1901). He was a pastor at Powhatan Point, Ohio (1885–1896), Moundsville, West Virginia (1896–1901) and Philadelphia, Pennsylvania (1908).

From 1908 he resided in Philadelphia and after 1920 in Camden. Williams married Mary Elizabeth Lanning in 1877, they had three children. His son Frank Harry Mead Williams (1896–1972) was a math professor at Drexel University.

== Creationism ==
Williams was a Christian young earth creationist who claimed to have mathematically disproven evolution. In 1925, Williams authored The Evolution of Man Scientifically Disproved: In 50 Arguments. It was revised and republished in an edition of 20,000 copies in 1928. The book was dismissed by mathematicians as a fundamentalist tract. Williams relied heavily on the Bible for his arguments.

Williams' book gave the first presentation of the creationist probability argument against evolution which influenced the pseudoscientific creation science movement. Glenn Branch deputy director of the National Center for Science Education has described Williams' arguments against evolution as "pseudomathematics".

== Selected publications ==
- Early American Families (1916)
- The Evolution of Man Scientifically Disproved: In 50 Arguments (1925, 1928)
