= Reid, Murdoch & Co. Building =

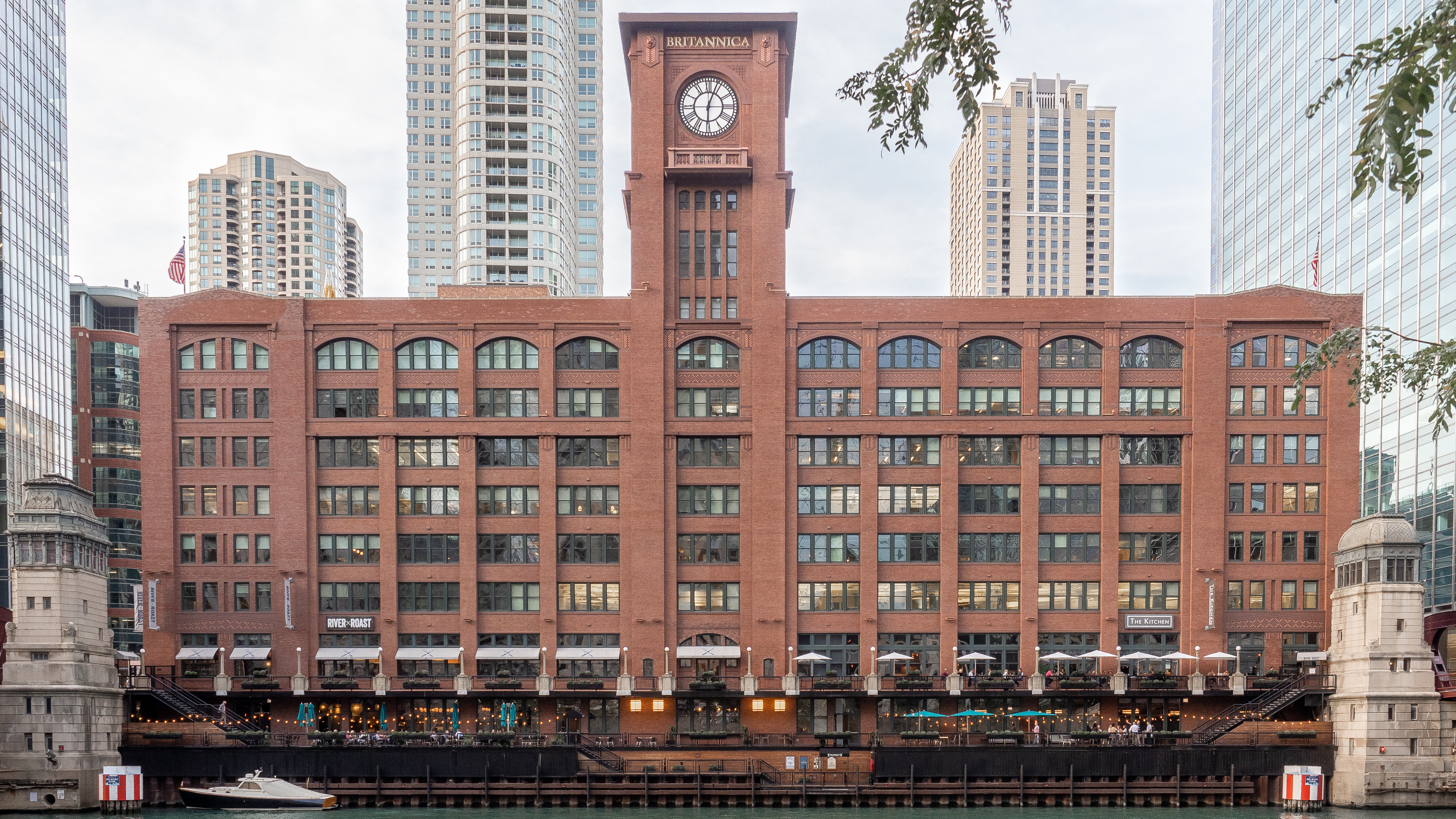
- As seen from the Chicago Riverwalk in 2021
- Interactive map of the Reid, Murdoch & Co. Building area

General information
- Type: Office/Warehouse
- Architectural style: Chicago school
- Location: Chicago, Illinois, U.S.
- Coordinates: 41.8880°N 87.6318°W
- Construction started: 1913
- Completed: 1914
- Governing body: Private/Friedman Properties

Technical details
- Floor count: 7

Design and construction
- Architect: George C. Nimmons
- Reid Murdoch Building
- U.S. National Register of Historic Places
- Location within Chicago metropolitan area Location within Illinois
- Location: 325 N. LaSalle St., Chicago, Illinois
- Coordinates: 41°53′17″N 87°37′54″W
- Area: 1 acre (0.40 ha)
- Built: 1913
- Architect: George C. Nimmons
- Architectural style: Chicago
- NRHP reference No.: 75000650
- Added to NRHP: August 28, 1975

The Reid, Murdoch & Co. Building, also known as the Reid Murdoch Building, the Reid Murdoch Center or the City of Chicago Central Office Building, is a seven-story office building in Chicago. It was constructed in 1914 and was listed on the National Register of Historic Places in 1975. It also has been designated as a Chicago Landmark; a Commission on Chicago Landmarks plaque can be found next to the LaSalle Street entrance. It is located at 325 North LaSalle Street in the River North neighborhood, alongside the Chicago River between LaSalle Street and Clark Street.

== History ==
The building was designed by George C. Nimmons for Reid, Murdoch & Company to be used as offices and a grocery warehouse. It was used as a makeshift hospital on 24 July 1915 after the S.S. Eastland capsized in the Chicago River on the opposite shore, directly across from the building. In 1930 the westernmost bay was demolished, due to the widening of LaSalle Street, and the façade lost its symmetry. From 1955 the building was used by the City of Chicago, housing its traffic courts, the State Attorney's Office, and various city departments. In 1998, it was redeveloped by Friedman Properties. The building currently houses the headquarters of Encyclopædia Britannica.

== See also ==
- Chicago architecture
- Chicago Landmark
