= William Burnet =

William Burnet may refer to:

- William Burnet (colonial administrator) (1688–1729) British colonial administrator
- William Burnet (physician) (1730–1791) American physician and political leader

== See also ==
- William Burnett (disambiguation)
- William Burnet Kinney, American diplomat and politician
