= 680 North Lake Shore Drive =

Condominium building in Chicago, Illinois

Coordinates: 41.8946°N 87.6168°W

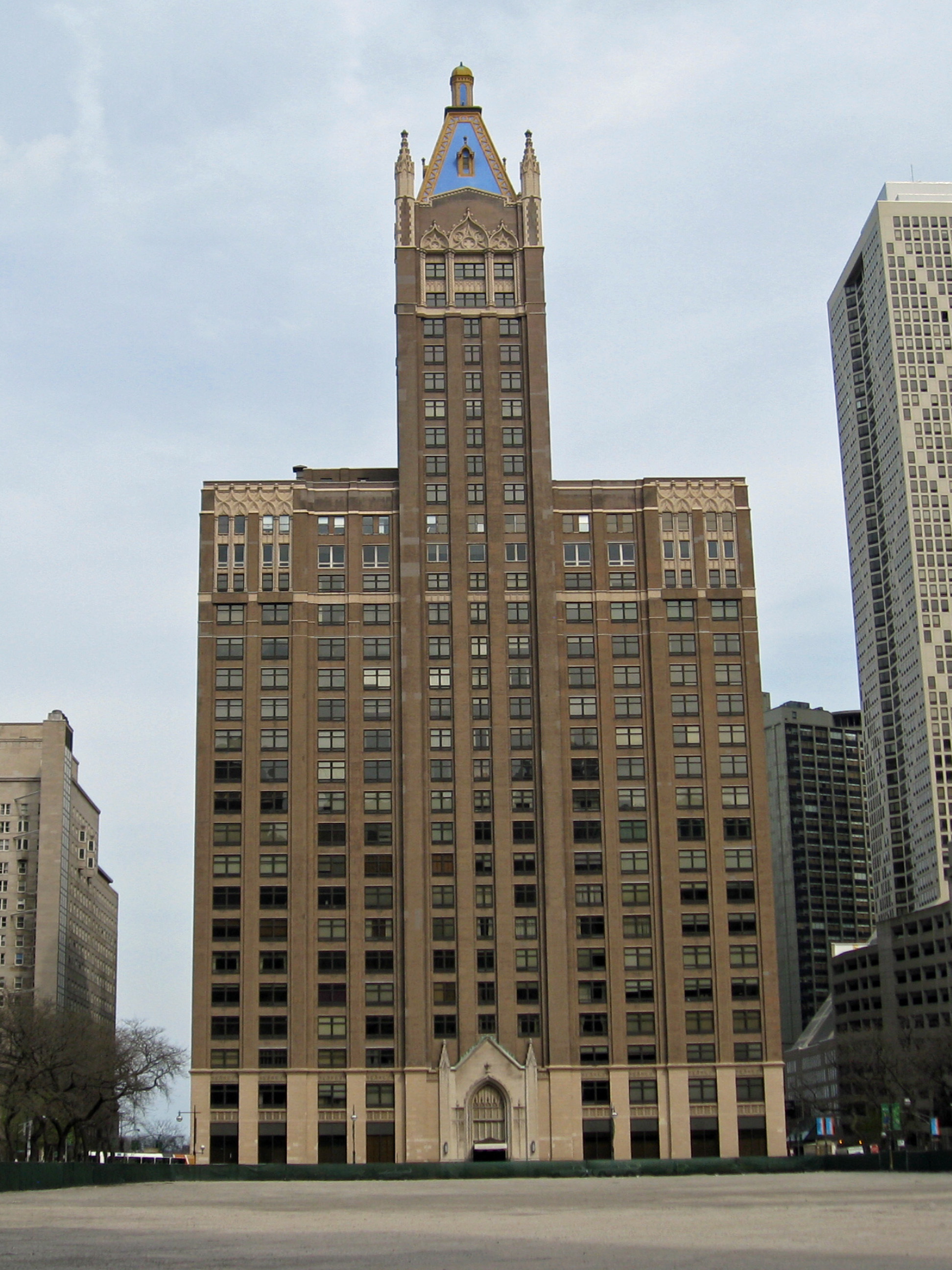
- (April 2010)
- Interactive map of the 680 North Lake Shore Drive area
- Alternative names: American Furniture Mart

General information
- Status: Completed
- Architectural style: neo-gothic
- Location: 680 North Lake Shore Drive
- Construction started: 1922
- Completed: 1926

Height
- Architectural: 474 ft

Technical details
- Floor count: 29

Design and construction
- Architects: Nimmons & Co.

680 North Lake Shore Drive (a.k.a. Lake Shore Place) is a 29-story building located in the Streeterville neighborhood of Chicago, Illinois. Originally named the American Furniture Mart, was completed in 1926. The two halves were designed separately: the eastern half by Raeder, George C. Nimmons, and Max Dunning; and the western half by Nimmons and Dunning alone. At 474 ft (144 m) tall and encompassing the entire block between Lake Shore Drive and McClurg Court, it was the largest building in the world when it was completed.

== Architecture ==
Construction of the American Furniture Mart was undertaken in two phases: the eastern section was completed in 1923, and the western portion (including the tower) in 1926. The eastern half is constructed with reinforced concrete, whereas the western half, as well as the tower, is steel. A 1959 newspaper story, based on reminiscences by the building's president, claimed the building included provisions for mooring airships, but nothing about airships appears in the descriptions of the building when it was being planned or built.

The building was converted by David L. Paul into condominium and office space between 1979 and 1984. Paul hired Lohan Associates, Inc. to be one of two architects. The design concept was Paul's. It is now home to 415 condo units divided amongst the building's three separate condominium associations: the Tower, the Lake, and the South residences. There is also 420,000 sq ft (39,000 m^{2}) of commercial office space, 65,000 sq ft (6,000 m^{2}) of retail space, and seven levels of indoor parking.

== History ==
During its early decades as the American Furniture Mart, the building's address was 666 North Lake Shore Drive. In 1984, Chemical Bank filed a foreclosure action against David Paul, which Chemical eventually won. Chemical announced that it would change the building's address from 666 N. Lake Shore Drive to 680 N. Lake Shore Drive effective May 1, 1988, officially as a way of dissociating the building from its past financial problems. There was speculation that the address change was intended to remove the stigma of the building having the number "666", as in the Number of the Beast from the Book of Revelation, or at the insistence of Playboy Enterprises which at the time was considering a move to the building. Representatives of both the building's management agent and Playboy denied that they were concerned about the use of that number in the address.

Later in 1988, a few months after the address change, Playboy Enterprises moved their corporate headquarters from its location in the Palmolive Building to the location at 680 N. Lake Shore Dr. Consequently, 680 became colloquially referred to as the "New Playboy Building". Playboy moved all of their offices out of this building in 2012, and the Playboy sign was taken down from the Erie Street entrance to the building.

Brand experience agency Jack Morton Worldwide had its Chicago office in the building during the Playboy era.

Another notable tenant was radio station WCFL (AM). They had their studios here from 1931 until 1964. At that time, they relocated broadcast facilities to Marina City, where they stayed for the next 25 years.

As of 2017, much of the building's office space is leased to medical tenants. The commercial portion of the building was sold to TopMed Realty in 2017 for $109.5 million.
