= Oskar Gross =

German-American artist

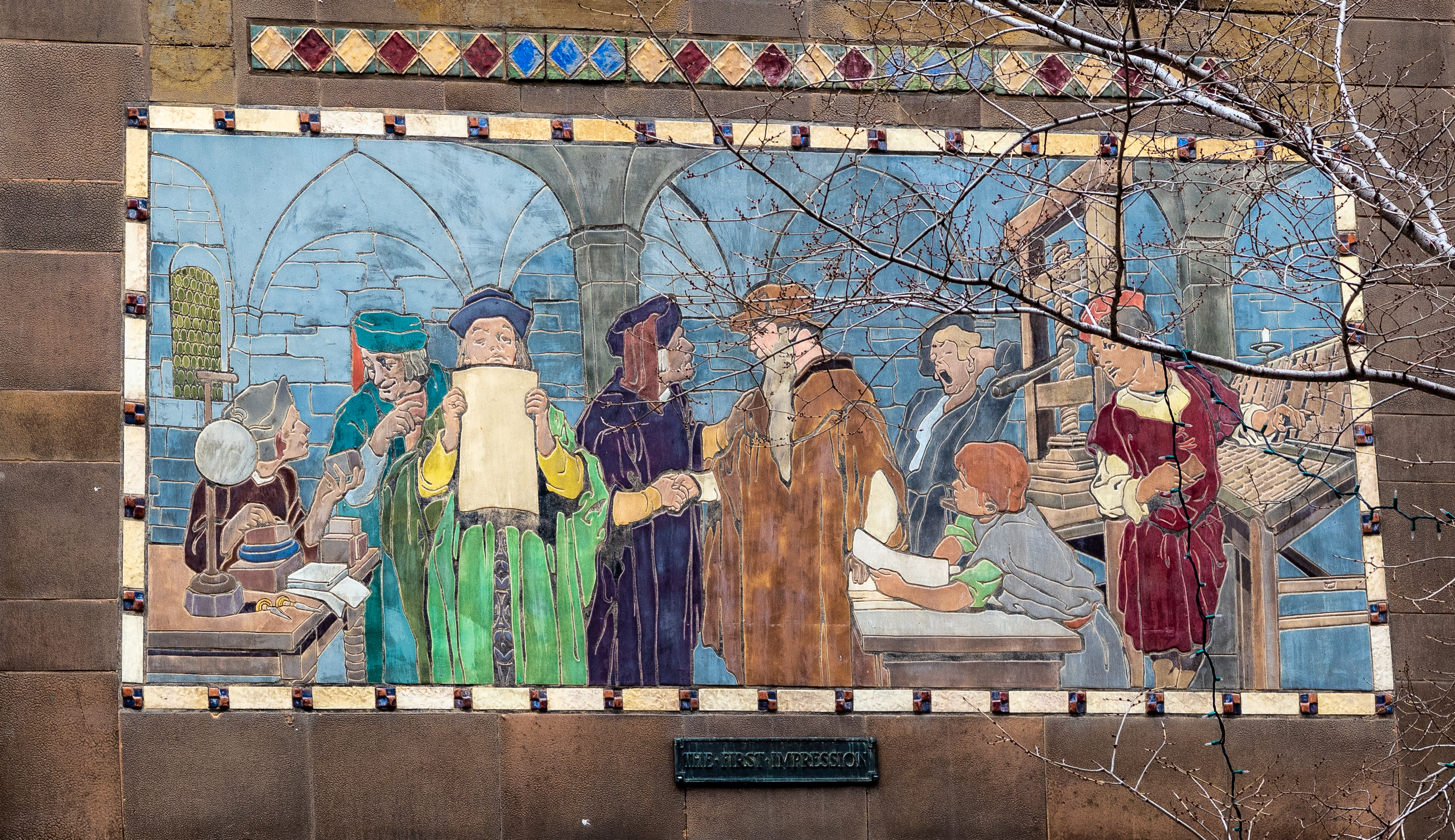
Mural over the entrance of the Franklin Building in Chicago, "The First Impression" (of the Gutenberg Bible)

Oskar Gross (1871 - 1963) was an artist in Germany and the United States. Born in Vienna, he worked in Munich before moving to the United States. His work included decorative murals in buildings for Daniel Burnham, Louis Sullivan and George C. Nimmons He was also a portraitist.

He was born in Vienna in 1871. He won a competition in 1898 to paint murals for the Austro-Hungarian state pavilions at the World's Fair in Paris. This led to an offer to work in Chicago.

He did paintings for Sullivan's National Farmers Bank in Owatonna, Minnesota, and interior paintings for Chicago's Franklin Building.

He returned to portrait painting after 1920. His work includes a portrait of Dankmar Adler displayed in the lobby of Roosevelt University.

He died in Chicago in 1963.
