= Ernest Burnett =

English cricketer

Personal information
- Full name: Ernest Wildman Burnett
- Born: 22 September 1844; Brighton, Sussex, England
- Died: 22 December 1931 (aged 87); Oxford, Oxfordshire, England
- Batting: Right-handed
- Bowling: Unknown-arm roundarm slow
- Relatives: John Burnett (brother)

Career statistics
Competition	First-class
Matches	5
Runs scored	45
Batting average	6.42
100s/50s	–/–
Top score	26
Balls bowled	188
Wickets	2
Bowling average	30.00
5 wickets in innings	–
10 wickets in match	–
Best bowling	2/39
Catches/stumpings	1/-
- Source: Cricinfo, 24 December 2018

Ernest Wildman Burnett (22 September 1844 – 22 December 1931) was an English first-class cricketer.

Born at Brighton, Burnett was educated at Harrow School. He made his debut in first-class cricket for the Gentlemen of Marylebone Cricket Club against the Gentlemen of Kent at Canterbury in 1862. Three years later he played two first-class matches for the Surrey Club against the Marylebone Cricket Club at The Oval and Lord's. He played for the Gentlemen of the South in the 1867 Gentlemen of the South v Gentlemen of the North fixture. He played in his final first-class match in 1868 for Southgate against Cambridge University at Fenner's. He scored a total of 45 run across his six first-class matches, as well as taking two wickets. Burnett was living in Cannock in 1874, where he was in partnership with Bernard Gilpin as a tool manufacturer. He was still associated with that industry in the Staffordshire area by 1911, when the company he was employed with, William Gilpin Senr. and Co. Limited, was liquidated. He died at Oxford in December 1931. His grandson was Brian Burnett.
