= Burnett Secondary School =

J N Burnett Secondary
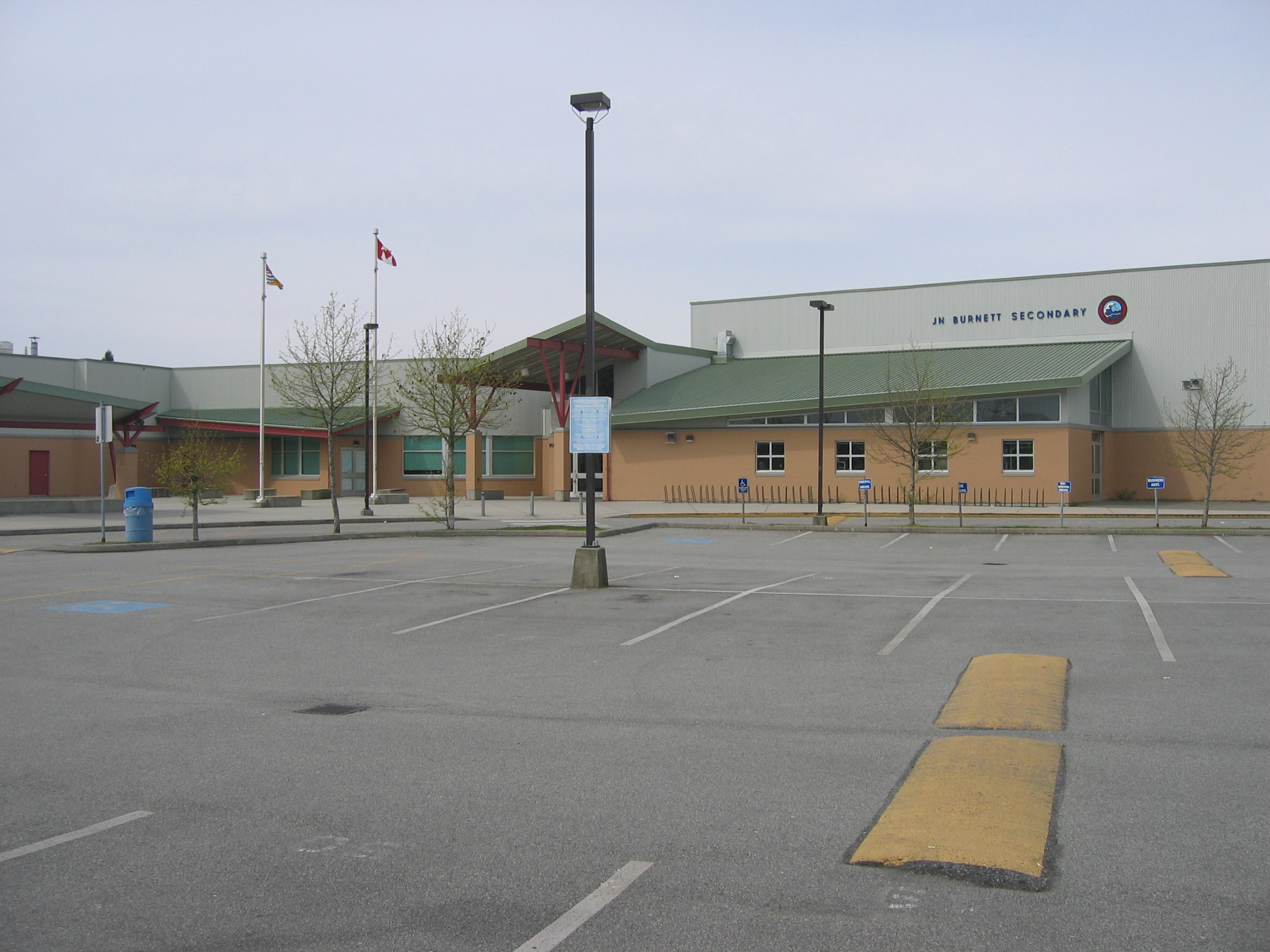

Location
- 5011 Granville Ave; Richmond, British Columbia, V7C 1E6; Canada; 49°09′50″N 123°10′08″W

Information
- School type: Public, high school
- Founded: 1968
- School board: School District 38 Richmond
- Superintendent: Scott Robinson
- Area trustee: Donna Sargent
- School number: 3838042
- Principal: Debbie Ten-Pow
- Staff: 63
- Grades: 8–12
- Enrollment: 1004 (January 30, 2017)
- Language: English, Chinese
- Colours: Blue, Red and White
- Mascot: Breakers
- Website: jnburnett.sd38.bc.ca

J.N. Burnett Secondary School is a secondary school located at 5011 Granville Ave., Richmond, British Columbia, Canada. The current principal is Debbie Ten-Pow, and there are currently over 1000 students enrolled.

The school is named after John Napier Burnett, a pioneer.

Burnett's badminton program, having placed 2nd at the 2001–02 British Columbia badminton provincials, Champions in 2002–03, 2nd in 2007–08, and 2nd in 2009–10.

Burnett's tennis program placed in the Top 2 of Richmond High Schools consistently since 2000. Between 2003 and 2006, Burnett was 1st in RSSAA and consistently placed in the Top 6 and the BCSSA. As of May 2018, Burnett holds the top ranking in the Richmond school district.

Burnett's soccer program was also strong, producing elite players such as Sahil Aulakh.

Burnett's table tennis program won the provincial championship in 2007 and 2008.

The SAT School Code for Burnett is 821309.

== History ==
Burnett opened in 1968 with grades 8–10, being classified as a junior secondary school. The first year the school was open (1968–1969), the building's second floor had not yet been completed, which caused the class times for different grades to vary for a year; students in grades 9 and 10 attended classes morning, whereas grade 8 classes took place in the afternoon. In September 1969, the entire student body attended with normal hours.

== Clubs and activities ==
=== Robotics ===
Breaker Robotics is a robotics club that participates in the FIRST Robotics Competition with the team number, 7796. The club has won the Canadian Pacific Regional in 2019, and became finalist in the same regional in 2020.
