= George C. Nimmons =

American architect

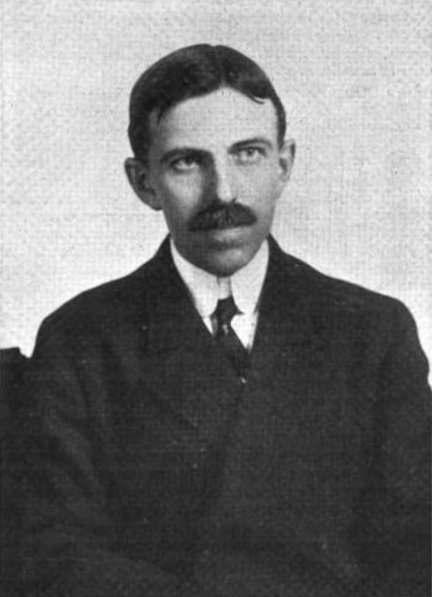
- Born: July 8, 1865; Wooster, Ohio, U.S.
- Died: June 17, 1947 (aged 81); Chicago, Illinois
- Resting place: Oak Woods Cemetery
- Education: Art Institute of Chicago
- Occupation: Architect
- Spouse: Justine V. Wheeler
- Children: 2 daughters

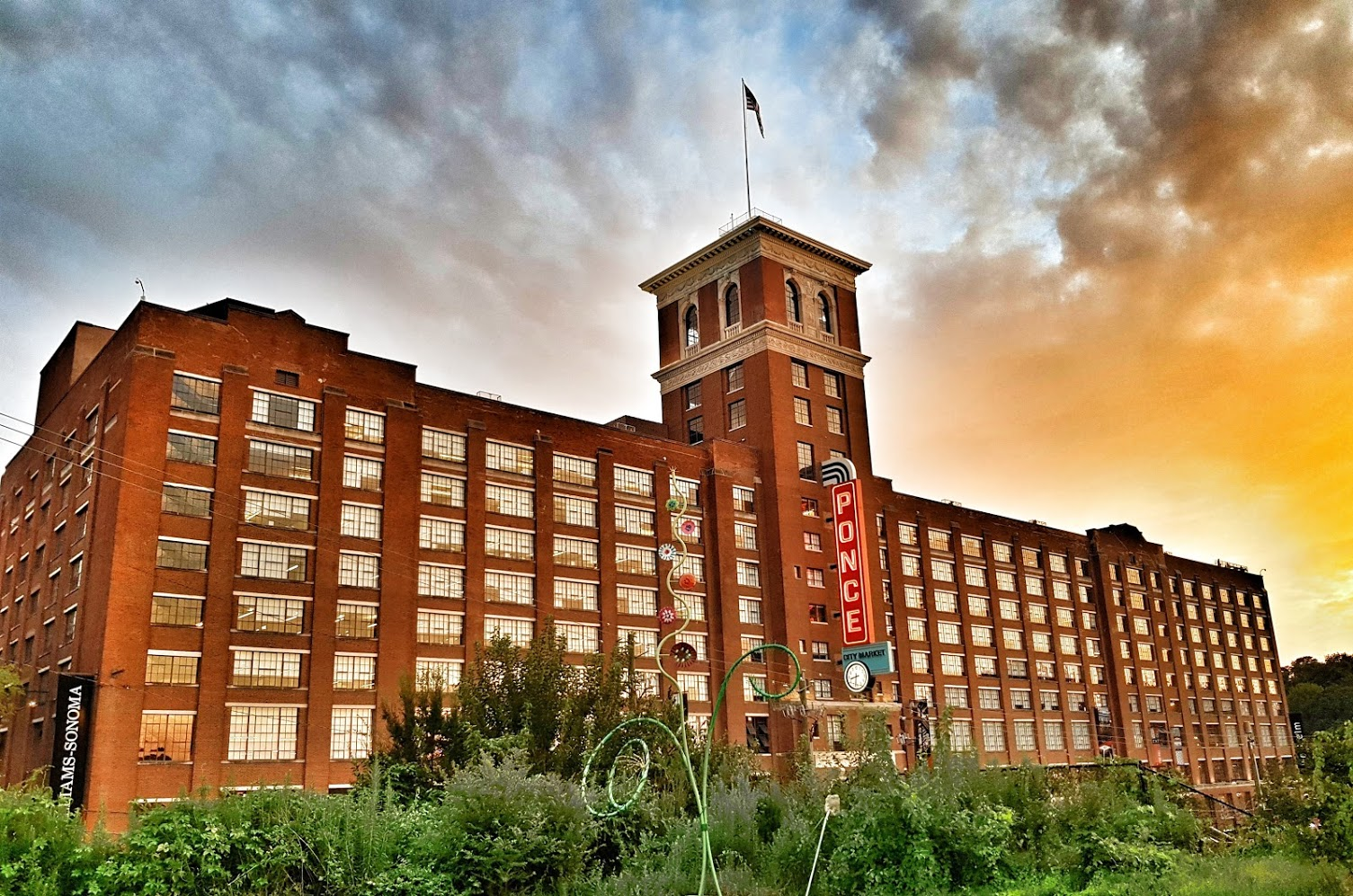
Ponce City Market, Atlanta

Rear view of Rosenwald Mansion in Chicago (Nimmons & Fellows, 1903) Source: The Western Architect, January 1910 (15:1)

George Croll Nimmons (June 8, 1865 – June 17, 1947) was an American architect. Nimmons was best known for his commercial work, which was primarily for Sears, Roebuck and Company, but he also designed several houses, including a Kenwood mansion for Sears' President, Julius Rosenwald.

== Early life ==
A native of Wooster, Ohio, Nimmons attended the Academy there and later studied architecture in Europe. He was also a student at the School of the Art Institute of Chicago.

== Career ==
In 1887 Nimmons was hired by the famous architectural firm of Burnham and Root where he served as a draftsman for 10 years. He partnered with William K. Fellows (1870-1948) in the late 1890s in the firm Nimmons & Fellows. During their partnership, Nimmons and Fellows designed a number of large commercial buildings in Chicago. In 1904 they were awarded what was very likely the largest single commission in the history of Chicago building up to that date. Sears, Roebuck and Co. selected them to design their warehouse, distribution and administrative center on West Arthington Avenue at Homan. It was said to be the largest mercantile establishment in the world at the time and was built in exactly 12 months, an amazing feat of construction. Nimmons and Fellows also designed branch buildings for Sears in several midwestern cities. Another result of the Nimmons and Fellows collaboration is the Dixon Building at 411 S. Wells. In 1910, Fellows formed a new firm with Dwight L. Perkins and John Hamilton.

Nimmons' experience with warehouse design and construction brought him the commission for a large office and storage building for Reid, Murdoch and Co., built between 1912 and 1913 along the north bank of the Chicago River between Clark and LaSalle. The building is noteworthy because it conformed to Burnham's Civic Plan and was the first attempt to make the riverside of a building attractive in Chicago. Until recently, this structure was leased to the city for municipal offices. Practicing on his own from 1910 to 1917 Nimmons also designed the Kimball Piano Company Building during this phase of his career.

Working as the head of his own firm, George C. Nimmons and Co. (1917–33), Nimmons designed the American Furniture Mart at 680 N. Lake Shore Drive in 1923. In the final phase of his career, he was senior partner of Nimmons, Carr & Wright.

Nimmons' numerous articles in leading architectural magazines expounded on his concept of industrial design and its impact on employees.

=== Selected buildings ===
- Sears, Roebuck and Company Administration Building (Nimmons & Fellows, 1905), (George C. Nimmons & Co., 1914)
- Homan Square Power House (Nimmons & Fellows, 1905)
- Washburne Trade School (Nimmons & Fellows, 1909)
- Reid, Murdoch & Co. Building (1913)
- Midtown Exchange, Minneapolis (1927)
- Landmark Center, Boston (1928)
- Ponce City Market (originally Sears distribution center and retail store), Atlanta (1926)
- Franklin Building, Chicago (Printer's Row, 1916) with mural and painted tiles by Oskar Gross.
- Starbucks Center, (originally Sears warehouse), Seattle (1913)
- American Furniture Mart, Chicago (1924)

== Death ==
With his wife, Justine V. née Wheeler, Nimmons had two daughters, Marie and Nancy. They resided in Chicago.

Nimmons died at his home in Chicago on June 17, 1947. He was buried in Oak Woods Cemetery.
