= Clive Bircham =

English footballer (1939–2020)

Personal information
- Full name: Walter Clive Bircham
- Date of birth: 7 September 1939
- Place of birth: Philadelphia, England
- Date of death: 6 June 2020 (aged 80)
- Position: Winger

Youth career
- 1956: Shiney Row Swifts

Senior career*
Years	Team	Apps	(Gls)
1956–1960	Sunderland	28	(2)
1960–1963	Hartlepool United	105	(15)
1963–196?	Boston United		
- * Club domestic league appearances and goals

Walter Clive Bircham (7 September 1939 – 6 June 2020) was an English professional footballer who played as a winger for Sunderland.

Bircham died on 6 June 2020, aged 80.
