= Thomas Burnett =

Thomas Burnett or Burnet may refer to:

- Thomas Burnet (theologian) (c. 1635–1715), theologian
- Thomas Burnet (judge) (1694–1753), English wit, barrister and judge
- Thomas Burnet (physician) (1638–1704), physician to Charles II, James II, William and Mary, and Queen Anne
- Sir Thomas Burnett, 1st Baronet (died 1653), feudal baron who represented Kincardineshire in the Scottish Parliament, 1621
- Sir Thomas Burnett, 3rd Baronet (after 1656–1714), MP for Scotland, 1707–1708
- Sir Thomas Burnett, 6th Baronet (died 1783), of the Burnett baronets
- Sir Thomas Burnett, 8th Baronet (1778–1849), Lord Lieutenant of Kincardine, 1847–1849
- Sir Thomas Burnett, 12th Baronet (1840–1926), Lord Lieutenant of Kincardine, 1920–1926
- Thomas Burnett (footballer) (1852–?), Wales international footballer
- Thomas Burnett (New Zealand politician) (1877–1941), New Zealand politician
- Thomas Lloyd Burnett (1871–1938), American rancher from Texas
- Thomas Stuart Burnett (1853–1888), Scottish sculptor
- Thomas P. Burnett (1800–1846), Michigan and Wisconsin Territorial legislator
- Tom Burnett (footballer) (1913–1986), English footballer for Darlington
- Tom Burnett (Flight 93 passenger) (1963–2001), passenger aboard United Airlines Flight 93, and victim of the attacks on September 11
- Tom L. Burnett (born 1954), politician in the Montana House of Representatives

== See also ==
- Thomas Burnett Swann (1928–1976), American poet and author
- Tom Burnette (1915–1994), American football player
