= Justice Burnett =

Justice Burnett or Burnet may refer to:

- E. C. Burnett III (born 1942), associate justice of the South Carolina Supreme Court
- George H. Burnett (1853–1927), chief justice of the Oregon Supreme Court
- Hamilton S. Burnett (1895–1973), associate justice of the Tennessee Supreme Court
- Jacob Burnet (1770–1853), associate justice of the Supreme Court of Ohio
- John Burnett (judge) (1831–1901), associate justice of the Oregon Supreme Court
- Peter Hardeman Burnett (1807–1895), associate justice of the Supreme Court of California
