= Graham Beighton =

English footballer (born 1939)

Personal information
- Full name: Graham Beighton
- Date of birth: 1 July 1939 (age 87)
- Place of birth: Sheffield, England
- Position: Goalkeeper

Senior career*
| Years | Team | Apps | (Gls) |
- Firth Brown Tools
| 1959–1961 | Sheffield Wednesday | 0 | (0) |
| 1961–1966 | Stockport County | 137 | (0) |
| 1966 | Wrexham | 23 | (0) |
- * Club domestic league appearances and goals

Graham Beighton (born 1 July 1939) is an English former professional footballer who played as a goalkeeper. He made appearances in the English Football League with Stockport County and Wrexham.
