= Bronc Burnett =

Sports novels for adolescents

- Volume 1
- Author: Wilfred McCormick
- Country: United States
- Language: English
- Genre: Sports
- Publisher: G.P. Putnam's Sons (#1–11); David McKay (#12–23); Bobbs-Merrill (#24–27); Grosset & Dunlap
- Published: 1948–1967

Bronc Burnett is the central character in a series of 27 football, baseball, and scouting novels for adolescent boys set in Sonora, New Mexico, written by Wilfred McCormick between 1948 and 1967.

== List of titles ==
1. The Three-Two Pitch (1948)
2. Legion Tourney (1948)
3. Fielder's Choice (1949)
4. Flying Tackle (1949)
5. Bases Loaded (1950)
6. Rambling Halfback (1950)
7. Grand Slam Homer (1951)
8. Quick Kick (1951)
9. Eagle Scout (1952)
10. The Big Ninth (1958)
11. The Last Put Out (1960)
12. One O'Clock Hitter (1960)
13. Stranger In The Backfield (1960)
14. The Bluffer (1961)
15. Man In Motion (1961)
16. Rebel With A Glove (1961)
17. Too Late To Quit (1962)
18. Once A Slugger (1963)
19. Rough Stuff (1963)
20. The Throwing Catcher (1964)
21. The Pro Toughback (1964)
22. The Right-End Option (1964)
23. The Go-Ahead Runner (1965)
24. Seven In Front (1965)
25. Tall At The Plate (1966)
26. No Place For Heroes (1966)
27. The Incomplete Pitcher (1967)
28. One Bounce Too Many (1967)
