= Leif Iwarsson =

Swedish footballer (born 1939)

Leif Gunnar Iwarsson (born 22 February 1939 in Hallstahammar) is a Swedish former footballer who played as a midfielder for Norrby IK between 1949 and 1955. After that he played for Hallstahammar SK between 1955 and 1959. Between 1960 and 1962, he studied in Uppsala and played for IK Sirius.

For the 1963 football season, he started playing for AIK in the Allsvenskan. He was part of the club's training camp in Turin ahead of AIKs matches against Inter Milan and also played in their match against Juventus. He played one game in Allsvenskan on 21 April 1963 when AIK met IS Halmia, a match AIK won with 4–2.

During 1990, he was the leader of the Swedish female national football team.
