= Maud Burnett =

Dame Maud Burnett DBE

Mayor of Tynemouth
- In office 1928–1930

Personal details
- Born: Annie Maud Burnett; 27 February 1863 10 Prior's Terrace, Tynemouth, Northumberland, England
- Died: 17 November 1950 (aged 87) Collingwood Terrace, Tynemouth, England

Dame Annie Maud Burnett DBE JP (27 February 1863 — 17 November 1950) was a local English politician who served as the first female mayor of Tynemouth.

== Life ==
The second daughter of Jacob Burnett, an alkali manufacturer Burnett was born on 27 February 1863 at 10 Prior's Terrace, Tynemouth, Northumberland, where she is commemorated by a Blue Plaque. She was taught at local schools before travelling to Vevey, Switzerland, to complete her education. After returning she did voluntary welfare work and work teaching a bible class and at the Church of the Holy Saviour in Tynemouth. Following her family's Liberal political sympathies, Burnett served as honorary secretary of the Tynemouth Women's Liberal Federation from 1895 to 1910.

In 1902, Burnett founded a Tynemouth branch of the Women's Local Government Society, standing for election to the municipal council in 1909. Although defeated, she was returned the next year with the support of the Liberal Society, becoming the first woman in the North of England to sit as a municipal councillor. In 1918 she was created a DBE in thanks for her work during the First World War as President of the Tynemouth War Savings Association, and on 28 August 1920 was made a Justice of the Peace.

Following her retirement from the council in 1921 she did voluntary work before being re-elected in 1926. From 1928 to 1930 she served a pair of two-year terms as Mayor of Tynemouth, and was the first woman elected to that position.

A portrait of her attributed to John William Gilroy is in the ownership of North Tyneside Council

== Death ==
She retired from politics in 1934, and died at home on 17 November 1950, aged 87.

== Family ==
Her younger brothers John Walter Burnett (1864-1946) and Norman Burnett founded the Burnett Steam Shipping Company.
