= Franklin College Building No. 5 =

- U.S. National Register of Historic Places
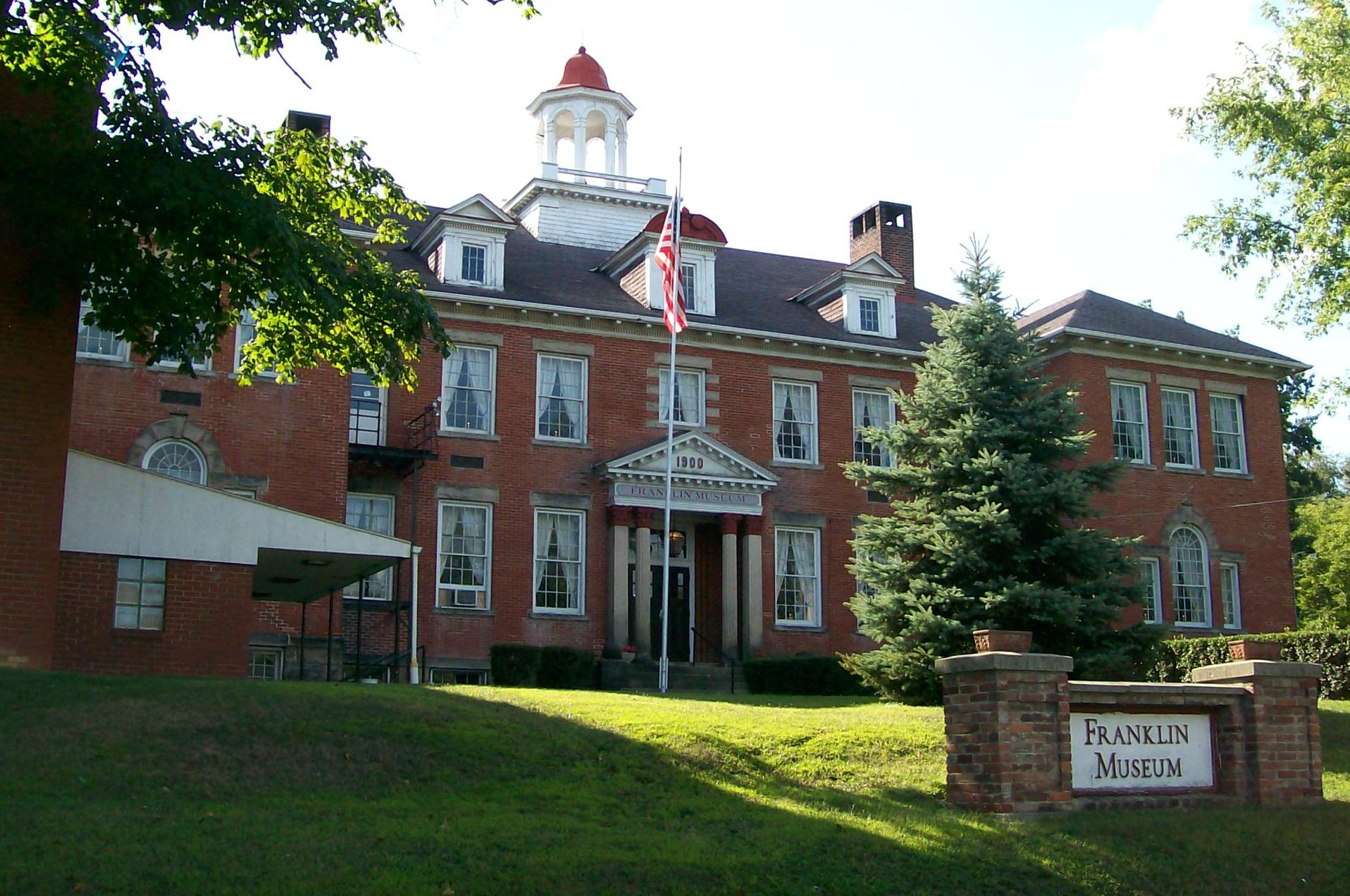
- Facade of the Franklin College Building No. 5
- Interactive map of Franklin College Building No. 5
- Location: Main St., New Athens, Ohio
- Coordinates: 40°11′15″N 80°59′47″W
- Area: 3 acres (1.2 ha)
- Built: 1900
- Architect: Yost & Packard
- Architectural style: Colonial Revival, Georgian Revival
- NRHP reference No.: 87000687
- Added to NRHP: May 8, 1987

The Franklin College Building No. 5 is located along Main Street, or State Route 9, in New Athens, Ohio. The building houses the Franklin Museum which is dedicated to preserving the building and its primary function. The college building was placed on the National Register on May 8, 1987.

== History ==
John Walker, an abolitionist and Presbyterian Church minister, established Alma College in New Athens in 1818. The primary function of the college was to promote religion and abolitionist beliefs in the area. The college was renamed Franklin College in 1825, but the college kept its original mission. Over the span of operations the college operated out of several buildings around New Athens.

Over the course of over 100 years, the college was key in the education of two governors, eight U.S. Senators, and nine U.S. Congressmen and twenty state legislators. The college also graduated Titus Basfield, an African-American student and former slave, as well as several prominent women.

The college slowly dwindled until only one building remained, which ceased operations in 1919, due to a decrease in enrollment. The building became affiliated with Muskingum College in New Concord from 1919 until 1927. The New Athens School District purchased the building and operated the high school in the building from 1927 to 1971, the middle school from 1971 to 1987, after which it sat vacant. The Franklin Museum purchased the building in 1992 and opened the building as a museum.

== Exterior ==
The current building, number 5 of the original college layout, sits on a slight hill overlooking Main Street below. The building dates from 1900, after the original log structure burned down in 1899. The building was designed by Joseph W. Yost of the firm Yost & Packard, and consists of red bricks with white wood trim boards. The main building is shaped like a "U", with the wings facing the street. The recessed main entrance is located in the center of the "U" and is framed by four Corinthian columns supporting an entablature and a pediment. The entablature is emblazoned with a nameplate reading "Franklin Museum". The pediment above contains dentil molding with a frieze containing "1900". The wooden double doors are topped by a transom light. Above this entrance is a square window with sandstone quoins.

The building rests upon rusticated sandstone blocks with small rectangular windows illuminating the bottom floor. The first and second floors contain large rectangular windows with sandstone casings. On either side of the entrance are three double-sashed windows. The wing projections each contain a palladian window on the main floor with three windows above.

The roof is supported by an entablature and overhangs the structure. Decorative brackets line the entablature along the building. The hipped roof is pierced by three dormer windows with the central dormer containing a decorative pediment. A drum supporting an open cupola with eight arches with Doric columns rises from the center of the roof, to either side of the cupola is a large brick chimney.

== See also ==
- Franklin College (New Athens, Ohio)
- William McMillan (college president)
- John Bingham
