= Malcolm Bogie =

Scottish footballer

Personal information
- Full name: Malcolm Fisher McKenzie Bogie
- Date of birth: 26 December 1939 (age 86)
- Place of birth: Edinburgh, Scotland
- Position: Inside forward

Senior career*
Years	Team	Apps	(Gls)
1955–1958	Balgreen Rovers		
1958–1963	Hibernian	3	(0)
1963–1964	Grimsby Town	1	(0)
1964–1965	Aldershot	2	(1)
1965–1968	Hawick Royal Albert		
1968–1969	Stirling Albion	1	(0)
- Gala Fairydean
Total		7	(1)
- * Club domestic league appearances and goals

Malcolm Fisher McKenzie Bogie (born 26 December 1939) was a Scottish professional footballer, who played as an inside forward.
