= William Burnett (preacher) =

American academic (b. 1808)

- Born: 1808; Abbeville District, South Carolina, US
- Died: Unknown; Manchester, Pennsylvania, US
- Education: Jefferson College
- Church: Associate Reformed Presbyterian Church
- Ordained: April 13, 1836; Presbytery of Monongaleha
- Congregations served: Robinson's Run, Pennsylvania (1836–1838); Fourth Associate Reformed Church, (1840–1841); Mt. Nebo (1845–1850)
- Offices held: President of Franklin College

William Burnett (born 1808) was an American college president and minister. He was President of Franklin College in New Athens, Ohio, serving from 1839 to 1840. He also served as Associate Reformed Presbyterian Church minister at various locations in Pennsylvania before leaving the ministry to head west.

Academic offices
Preceded by Jacob Coon	President of Franklin College; 1839–1840	Succeeded by Edwin H. Nevin
