= Peter Laverick =

English footballer

Personal information
- Full name: Peter Henry Laverick
- Date of birth: 29 January 1939
- Place of birth: Cleethorpes, England
- Date of death: 29 March 2013 (aged 74)
- Place of death: Cleethorpes, England
- Position: Inside forward

Senior career*
| Years | Team | Apps | (Gls) |
| 1956–1961 | Grimsby Town | 4 | (0) |
| 1961–1962 | Bristol City | 0 | (0) |
| 1962–196? | Ross Group | | |
- * Club domestic league appearances and goals

Peter Henry Laverick (29 January 1939 – 29 January 2013) was an English professional footballer who played as an inside forward.
