= Howard Burnett =

Howard Burnett may refer to:

- Howard J. Burnett (1929–2019), American president of Washington & Jefferson College
- Howard Burnett (sprinter) (born 1961), Jamaican track and field athlete
