= Bernette Beyers =

South African cyclist

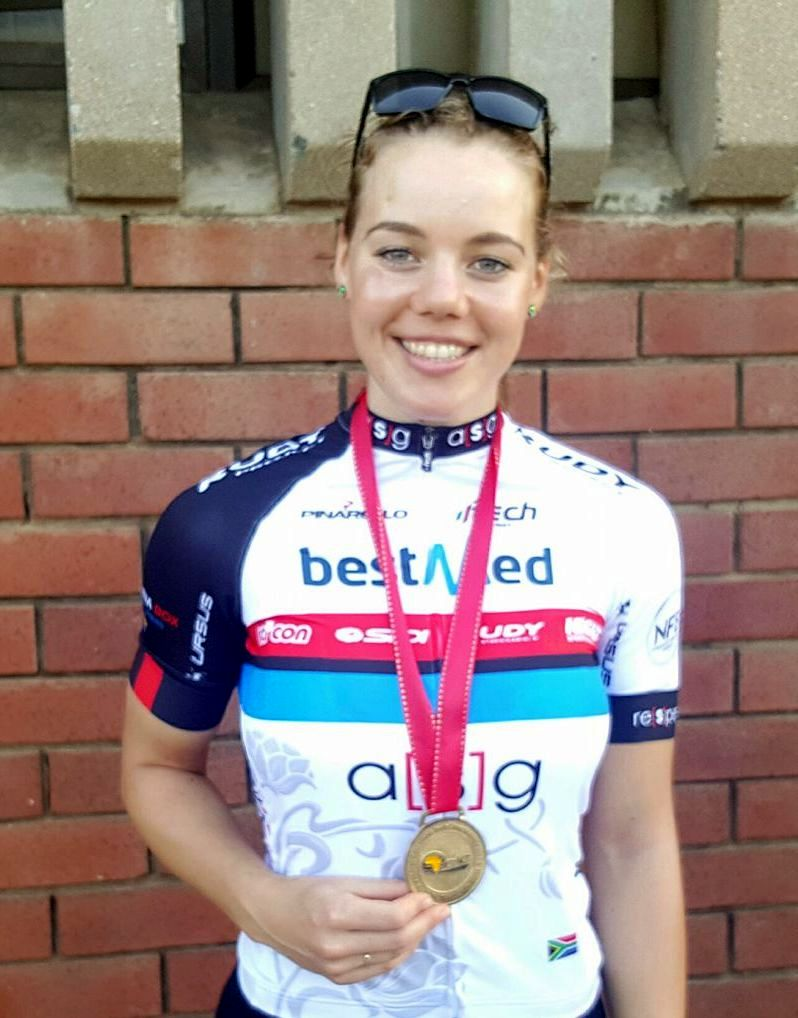

Personal information
- Born: January 17, 1992 (age 34) Stellenbosch, South Africa

Cycling career
- Sport: Cycling
Medal record
Women's cycling
Representing South Africa
African Cycling Championships
Gold medal – first place	2017	sprint, team sprint, 500m time trial, points race

Bernette Beyers (born 17 January 1992) is a South African female track cyclist. She claimed gold in the 500m time trial at the 2017 African Cycling Championships.

== Career ==
She began her cycling career in 2013. In 2015, she won six medals at the Western Cape Provincial Championships. Bernette went on to participate at the first round of the 2016-17 UCI Track Cycling World Cup which was held in Glasgow, Scotland. During the competition, she met with an accident and broke her collarbone (clavicle).
