= Burnette =

Burnette could be:

- an incorrect spelling of "brunette".
- Billy Burnette (born 1953), American guitarist
- Billy Joe Burnette (1941–2016), American country singer
- Dorsey Burnette (1932–1979), American rockabilly singer
- Johnny Burnette (1934–1964), American rockabilly and pop singer
- Kurt R. Burnette (born 1955), bishop of the Byzantine Catholic Eparchy of Passaic
- Reggie Burnette (born 1968), American football player
- Rocky Burnette (born 1953), American rock and roll singer
- Smiley Burnette (1911–1967), American singer-songwriter, musician, film and TV actor

== See also ==
- Burnet (disambiguation)
- Burnett (disambiguation)
- Bernette, people with this name
