= Burnett Township =

Burnett Township may refer to:

- Burnett Township, Pope County, Arkansas
- Burnett Township, Antelope County, Nebraska
- Burnett Township, Santa Clara County, California
