= Franklin Building (Chicago) =

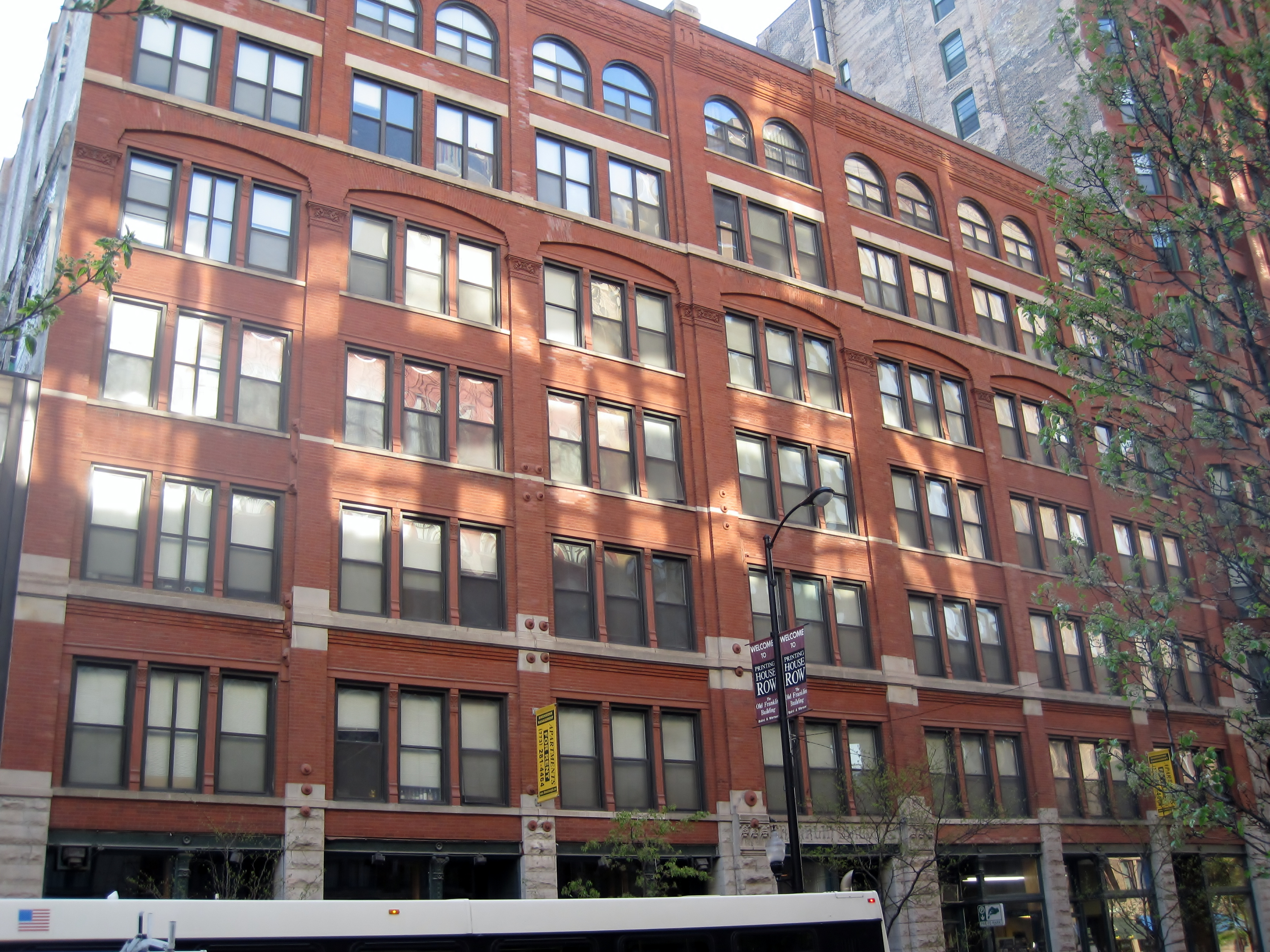
Old Franklin Building built in 1886

The Franklin Building is a 14-story brick building on Printer's Row in Chicago, Illinois, located at 720 South Dearborn Street. It is one of the historic buildings in the City of Chicago Printing House Row landmark district. The building was designed by George C. Nimmons for the Franklin Printing Company and built in 1916 following on the company's previous building at 523 Dearborn, which was constructed in 1886. The current building is an example of Chicago School architecture. Oskar Gross, a painter from Vienna, Austria, did a mural over the main entrance and painted tiles for the building depicting an artist, engraver, typesetter, bookbinder, and other artisans involved in the printing process.

The decentralization of the printing process led to many buildings in the area, including the Franklin Building, being abandoned from their original uses. The building housed presses until 1983 and was converted into 65 condominium loft apartments in 1989. It was the last major building on Printer's Row to be converted.

== Architecture ==
The building is topped by a parapet with unusual gables accommodating large skylights, and has polychrome terra cotta tiles adorning it on its east façade, including the inscription: "The excellence of every art must consist in the complete accomplishment of its purpose." Gross' mural over the entry is entitled "The First Impression" and depicts men working on a Gutenberg press, printing the first edition of the Gutenberg Bible. Other tiles illustrate other aspects of the printing industry.

The top three floors were originally a loft space with a glass ceiling (skylight). The autumn leaf tile was made by the Wheatley Pottery Company of Cincinnati.

== Gallery ==
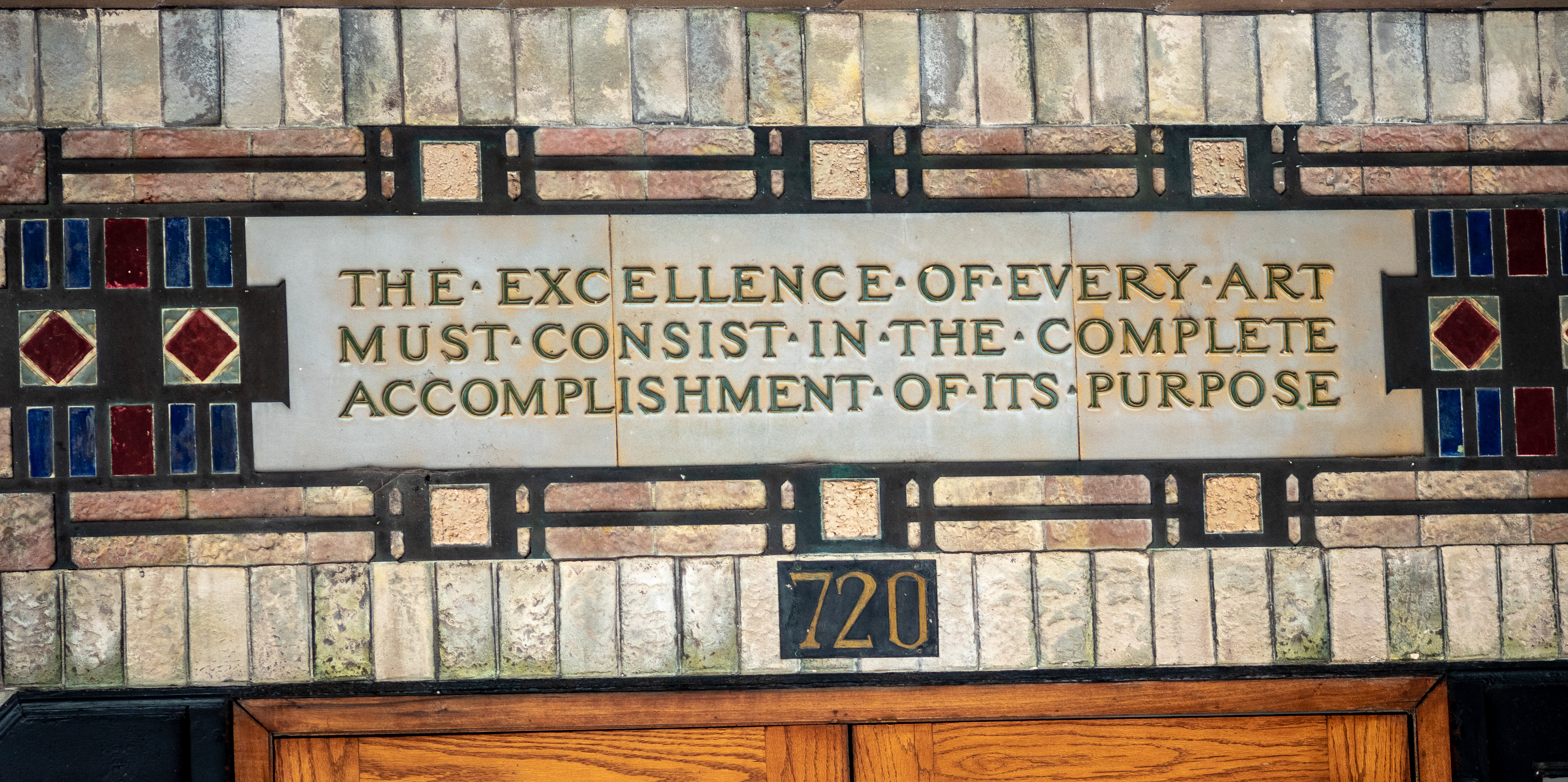
Inscription over entry doors

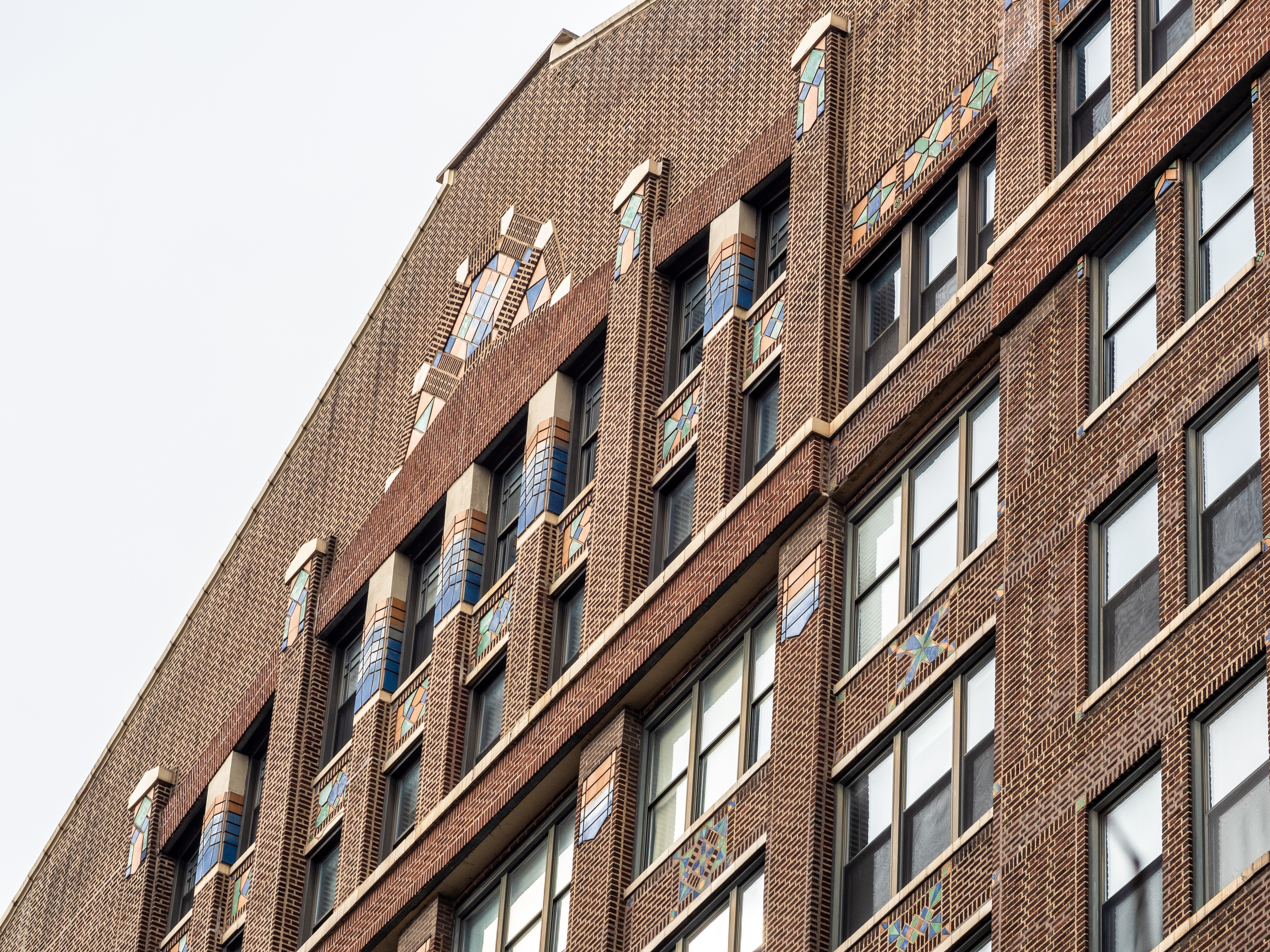
Roofline gable

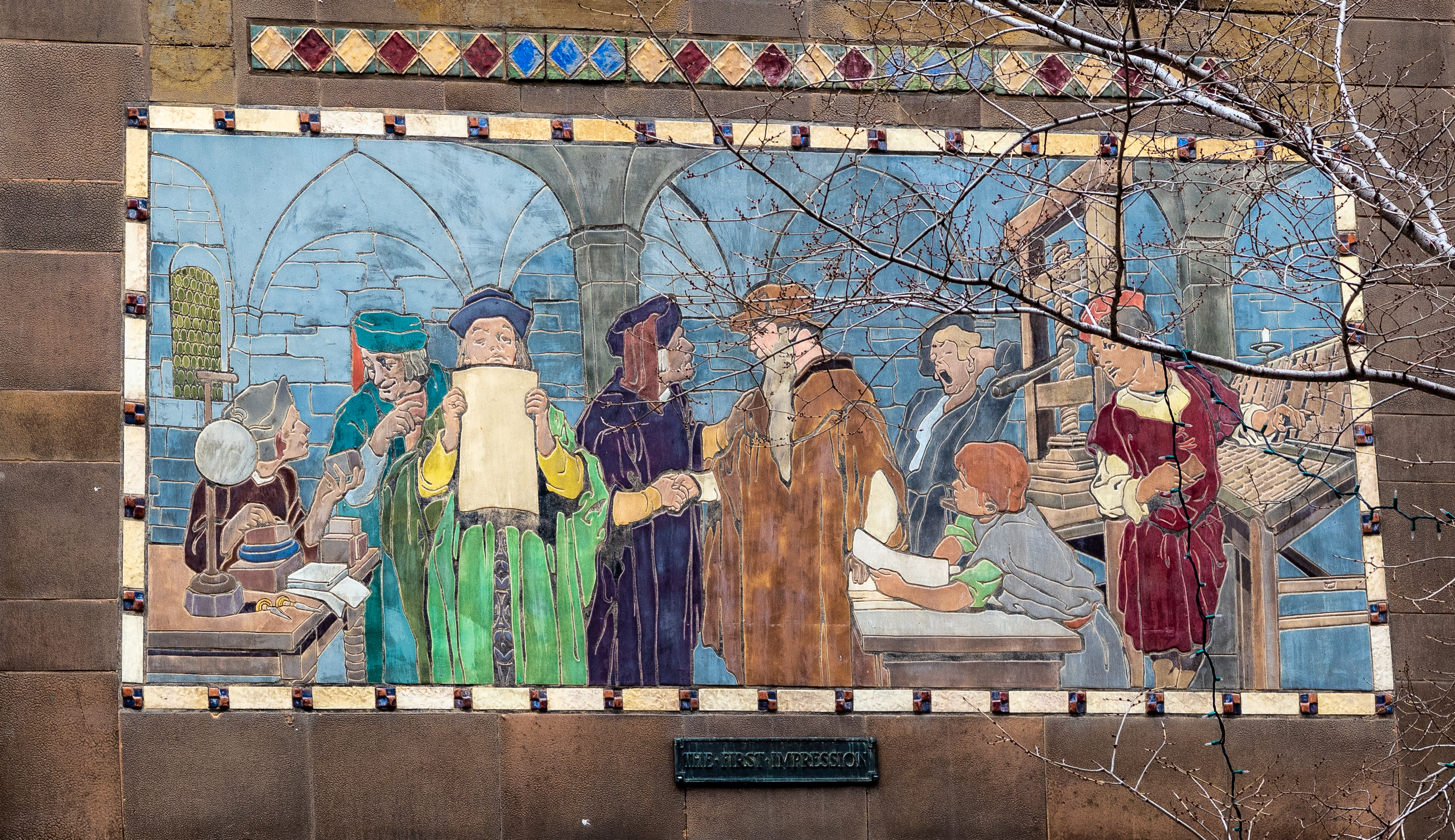
Mural over entrance: "The First Impression" by Oskar Gross (a depiction of the first edition of the Gutenberg Bible)
