= Tony Bratley =

English footballer

Personal information
- Full name: Charles Tony Bratley
- Date of birth: 30 April 1939 (age 87)
- Place of birth: Spalding, Lincolnshire, England
- Position: Full-back

Senior career*
Years	Team	Apps	(Gls)
1957–1960	Grimsby Town	2	(0)
1960–19??	Gainsborough Trinity		
- * Club domestic league appearances and goals

Charles Tony Bratley (born 30 April 1939) is an English retired professional footballer who played as a full-back.
