= New Athens, Ohio =

- Village
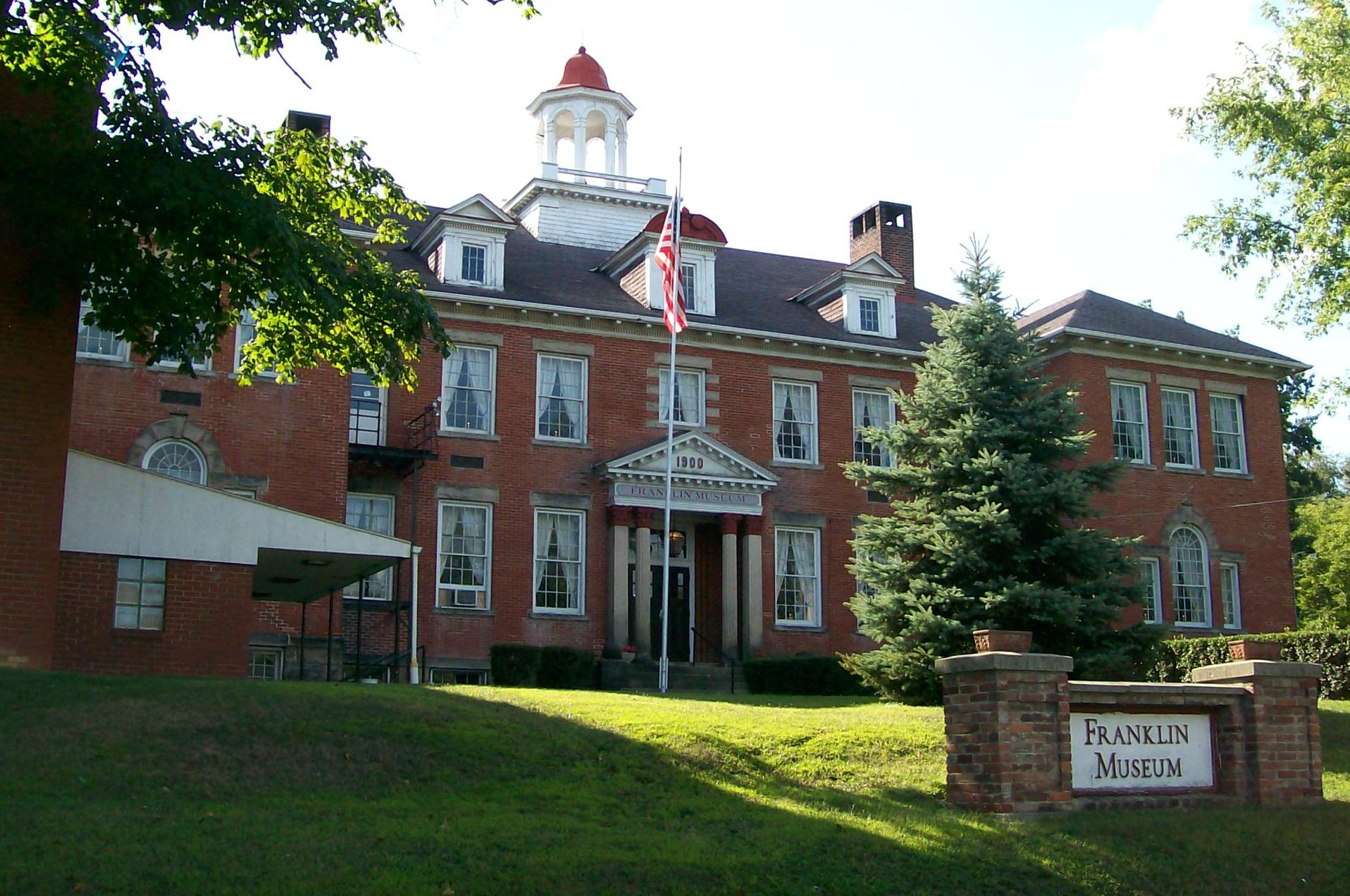
- The Franklin College Building in New Athens is listed on the National Register of Historic Places

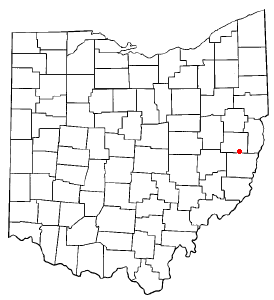
- Location of New Athens, Ohio

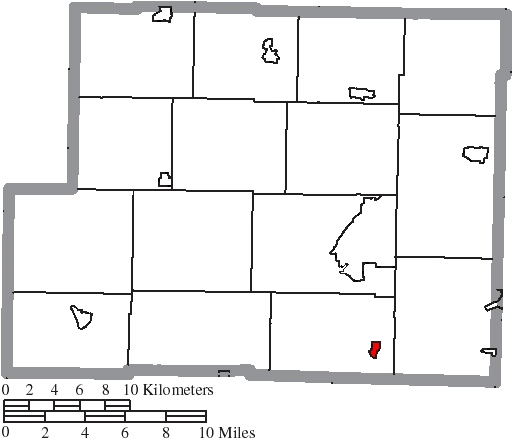
- Location of New Athens in Harrison County
- Coordinates: 40°11′02″N 80°59′53″W
- Country: United States
- State: Ohio
- County: Harrison
- Township: Athens
- Platted: 1817

Area
  - Total: 0.29 sq mi (0.75 km^{2})
  - Land: 0.29 sq mi (0.75 km^{2})
  - Water: 0 sq mi (0.00 km^{2})
- Elevation: 1,161 ft (354 m)

Population (2020)
  - Total: 222
  - Density: 770/sq mi (297.4/km^{2})
- Time zone: UTC-5 (Eastern (EST))
  - Summer (DST): UTC-4 (EDT)
- ZIP code: 43981
- Area code: 740
- FIPS code: 39-54068
- GNIS feature ID: 2399451

New Athens (/ˈeɪθənz/ AY-thənz) is a village in Athens Township, Harrison County, Ohio, United States. The population was 222 at the 2020 census.

== History ==
New Athens was platted in 1817. A post office has been in operation at New Athens since 1818.

Franklin College was founded in 1818 by abolitionist John Walker, a Presbyterian minister. The college ceased operation in 1919. Over the course of over 100 years, the college was key in the education of two governors, eight U.S. Senators, and nine U.S. Congressmen and twenty state legislators.

== Geography ==
According to the United States Census Bureau, the village has a total area of 0.28 square miles (0.73 km^{2}), all land.

== Demographics ==
Historical population
Census	Pop.	Note	%±
1850	331		—
1860	340		2.7%
1870	354		4.1%
1880	378		6.8%
1890	420		11.1%
1900	435		3.6%
1910	376		−13.6%
1920	408		8.5%
1930	464		13.7%
1940	508		9.5%
1950	509		0.2%
1960	473		−7.1%
1970	450		−4.9%
1980	440		−2.2%
1990	370		−15.9%
2000	342		−7.6%
2010	320		−6.4%
2020	222		−30.6%
U.S. Decennial Census

=== 2010 census ===
As of the census of 2010, there were 320 people, 140 households, and 95 families living in the village. The population density was 1,142.9 inhabitants per square mile (441.3/km^{2}). There were 148 housing units at an average density of 528.6 per square mile (204.1/km^{2}). The racial makeup of the village was 99.4% White, 0.3% African American, and 0.3% from two or more races.

There were 140 households, of which 27.1% had children under the age of 18 living with them, 52.1% were married couples living together, 9.3% had a female householder with no husband present, 6.4% had a male householder with no wife present, and 32.1% were non-families. 27.9% of all households were made up of individuals, and 11.5% had someone living alone who was 65 years of age or older. The average household size was 2.29 and the average family size was 2.69.

The median age in the village was 44.9 years. 19.1% of residents were under the age of 18; 6.6% were between the ages of 18 and 24; 24.7% were from 25 to 44; 30.9% were from 45 to 64; and 18.8% were 65 years of age or older. The gender makeup of the village was 48.4% male and 51.6% female.

=== 2000 census ===
As of the census of 2000, there were 342 people, 135 households, and 100 families living in the village. The population density was 1,210.1 inhabitants per square mile (467.2/km^{2}). There were 144 housing units at an average density of 509.5 per square mile (196.7/km^{2}). The racial makeup of the village was 98.83% White, 0.29% African American, and 0.88% from two or more races.

There were 135 households, out of which 26.7% had children under the age of 18 living with them, 63.0% were married couples living together, 7.4% had a female householder with no husband present, and 25.2% were non-families. 21.5% of all households were made up of individuals, and 13.3% had someone living alone who was 65 years of age or older. The average household size was 2.53 and the average family size was 2.91.

In the village, the population was spread out, with 21.6% under the age of 18, 7.3% from 18 to 24, 28.1% from 25 to 44, 24.6% from 45 to 64, and 18.4% who were 65 years of age or older. The median age was 40 years. For every 100 females there were 82.9 males. For every 100 females age 18 and over, there were 88.7 males.

The median income for a household in the village was $26,786, and the median income for a family was $31,667. Males had a median income of $25,833 versus $17,344 for females. The per capita income for the village was $12,771. About 18.8% of families and 19.6% of the population were below the poverty line, including 22.4% of those under age 18 and 13.5% of those age 65 or over.
