= John Napier Burnett =

Canadian educator (1899–1989)

John Napier Burnett (1899–1989) was an important pioneer of education in British Columbia.

Born in Fraserburgh, Scotland, Burnett moved to Vancouver in 1911. After completing his education in Vancouver, at the University of British Columbia, he became a member of the Epsilon Delta Chapter, Phi Delta Kappa. Burnett consulted the needs of both the students and the staff, and supported the welfare of educational organizations. He became more and more successful in the educational field, becoming the President of the BC Teachers Federation, and as an administrator in the Burnaby and Vancouver districts. In the World War II he served in the Irish Fusiliers, Vancouver Regiment, attaining the rank of lieutenant colonel.

After a stint in the Cariboo and Okanagan regions as an inspector of schools, he became director in various other areas. Burnett's efforts in improving the school infrastructure led him to become the District Superintendent of Schools in Richmond in 1955. He retired in 1964. He continued his work promoting educational standards in the community, and remains today one of the pioneers of education in Greater Vancouver. Today, a school in Richmond is named in his honour, Burnett Secondary School.
