= O. H. Burnett =

American lawyer, businessman, and politician

Otis Herman Burnett (January 7, 1872–August 10, 1906) was an American lawyer, businessman, and politician.

Burnett was born in Williamson County, Illinois and went to the Williamson County public schools. He worked as a cashier at the bank in Marion, Illinois. Burnett graduated from Valparaiso University in 1892 and from Yale Law School in 1899. Burnett was admitted to the Illinois bar in 1899 and practiced law in Marion, Illinois. Burnett served in the Illinois Senate from 1901 to his death in 1906. He was a Republican. Burnett died at his home in Marion, Illinois from a brief illness.
