= Calvin Burnett (Guyanese cricketer) =

Guyanese cricketer (born 1954)

Personal information
- Full name: Calvin Brian Burnett
- Born: 24 August 1954; Corriverton, British Guiana
- Died: 12 December 2024 (aged 70); Tennessee, United States
- Batting: Right-handed
- Bowling: Right-arm off-spin
- Role: All-rounder

Domestic team information
- Years: Team
- 1988–1989: Guyana
- 1988: Demerara
- Source: CricketArchive, 2 February 2016

Calvin Brian Burnett (24 August 1954 – 12 December 2024) was a Guyanese cricketer who played for Guyana in West Indian domestic cricket during the late 1980s.

Burnett made his first-class debut for Guyana in January 1988, playing against Jamaica in the 1987–88 Red Stripe Cup. An off-spin bowler and middle-order batsman, he took only a single wicket in his first season, but scored three half-centuries (50 and 52 on debut and 63 against Barbados). At the beginning of the following season, in October 1988, Burnett represented Demerara in the final of the Guystac Trophy, which at the time also held first-class status. His final matches for Guyana came in February 1989, against Barbados in the 1988–89 Geddes Grant Shield (a limited-overs competition).

Burnett emigrated to the United States in later life and died there in 2024 at the age of 70.
