= Calvin Burnett (artist) =

African-American artist

- Born: July 18, 1921; Cambridge, Massachusetts, US
- Died: October 8, 2007 (aged 86); Medway, Massachusetts, US

Academic background
- Education: Boston University

Academic work
- Discipline: visual art
- Institutions: Massachusetts College of Art; DeCordova Museum; MIT

Calvin Burnett (July 18, 1921, Cambridge, Massachusetts – October 8, 2007 in Medway, Massachusetts) was an African-American artist, illustrator and art educator.

Calvin Burnett graduated from the Massachusetts School of Art with a B.F.A. in 1942, and received a B.S. in education from the same university. He received his MFA from Boston University in 1960, and was a doctoral candidate there. He has taught at a number of institutions in the northeastern United States, including the Massachusetts College of Art, the DeCordova Museum, and at MIT. His work has been exhibited extensively throughout the United States, in galleries and museums including the Smithsonian Institution and the Brooklyn Museum.
