= Calvin Burnett (Scottish cricketer) =

Scottish cricketer

Personal information
- Full name: Calvin Gary Burnett
- Born: 23 October 1990 (age 36); Dundee, Scotland
- Batting: Left-handed
- Bowling: Right-arm medium-fast

International information
- National side: Scotland (2011–2013)
- Only T20I (cap 36): 5 July 2013 v Kenya
- Source: CricketArchive, 2 February 2016

Calvin Gary Burnett (born 23 October 1990) is a Scottish cricketer who made his debut for the Scottish national side in 2011. He is a right-arm pace bowler.

Burnett was born in Dundee, and was educated at Arbroath High School. He played for the Scotland under-19s at the 2008 and 2009 editions of the ICC Europe Under-19 Championship. Burnett made his senior Scottish debut in May 2011, at the 2011 Clydesdale Bank 40. His first-class debut came in June 2013, against Australia A. Later in the year, Burnett was selected in the Scottish squad for a series against Kenya, playing an Intercontinental Cup fixture and a single Twenty20 International. In the latter game, he took 3/18 from four overs, helping to restrict Kenya to 100/8 from 20 overs.
