= John Burnett (cricketer) =

English cricketer

John David Burnett (25 February 1840 – 18 June 1878) was an English first-class cricketer who played for Surrey. Having played from 1882 to 1890, he appeared in five first-class matches. His brother was Ernest Burnett, who was also a first-class cricketer.

He was educated at Harrow School for whom he played cricket. Born in Vauxhall, London, Burnett died in Pietermaritzburg, South Africa.
