= John Burnett (merchant) =

Scottish merchant and prize founder

John Burnett (1729–1784) was a Scottish merchant and founder of the Burnett prize.

== Biography ==
Burnett was the son of an Aberdeen merchant, who belonged to the Scottish Episcopal Church. He entered business in 1750, his father having failed shortly before, and made a living in stocking-weaving and salmon-fishing. He and his brother paid off their father's debts, amounting to £7,000 or £8,000.

Burnett gave up attending public worship, but gave religious instruction to his servants. He was influenced by the example of John Howard the philanthropist, whom he probably met in 1776 in Scotland, and took an interest in charitable movements.

He owned the estate of Dens in Buchan, just outside Aberdeen.

He died unmarried on 9 November 1784. His brother inherited his estate. Monies were also left for two literary prizes and to the poor of Aberdeen.

== Legacy ==
Burnett directed that part of his estate should be applied for the benefit of the poor of Aberdeen and the neighbourhood, and part to a fund for inoculation (the last was afterwards applied to vaccination). The remaining income was to accumulate for a period, and then to be given as a first and second prize for essays in proof of the existence of a supreme Creator, upon grounds both of reason and revelation. In 1815 the first prize was won by William Laurence Brown, and the second by John Bird Sumner, who became archbishop of Canterbury. In 1855 the first prize (£1,800) was won by the Rev. Robert A. Thomson, and the second by John Tulloch, later principal of St. Andrews. The funds were then applied to lectureships, on some branch of science, history, or archæology treated in illustration of natural theology. The first lectures under the new scheme were delivered at Aberdeen by Professor Stokes of Cambridge in November 1883.
