= John Burnett (footballer) =

English footballer (1939–2021)

Personal information
- Date of birth: 24 June 1939
- Place of birth: Market Rasen, England
- Date of death: 4 July 2021 (aged 82)
- Place of death: Halifax, England
- Position: Full-back

Senior career*
| Years | Team | Apps | (Gls) |
| 1957–1958 | Gainsborough Trinity | | |
| 1958–1959 | Grimsby Town | 1 | (0) |
- * Club domestic league appearances and goals

John Burnett (24 June 1939 – 4 July 2021) was an English professional footballer who played as a full-back.

Burnett died on 4 July 2021, at the age of 82.
