= House of Burnett =

Scottish clan family

- Motto: Virescit Vulnere Virtus (Courage Flourishes at a Wound)

Profile
- Plant badge: A sprig of holly leaves

Chief
- James Comyn Amherst Burnett of Leys,
- Chief of the Name and Arms of Burnett, Baron of Leys and Kilduthie.
- Historic seat: Crathes Castle

The House of Burnett (Burnet, Burnette, Burnard, Bernard) is a Lowland and Border Scottish family composed of several branches. (Note: Most Highland families are considered clans while many lowland families do not have septs and therefore are not, strictly speaking, clans but either referred to as families or houses. However in common usage the two terms are sometimes used interchangeably. Also, from Burnett, The Official Website is the following from the FAQ: "The Burnetts were never a 'clan' as the term is used in Scots custom and law. The clans in Scotland were patriarchal in scope and were essentially tribal societies whose members spoke Gaelic. The majority of Burnetts were not Gaelic speakers – most of them spoke Scots and, although many of them lived in or near the Scottish Highlands, they were not highlanders. The correct terminology for the Burnett family is 'House of Burnett' as is the case with a number of great Scottish families (Bruce, Gordon and Dunbar for example). Although the term 'clan' has been used to describe some Lowland families, even in the Lyon Court records, there was never a 'Clan Burnett'.") The Chief of the Name and Arms of Burnett is James Comyn Amherst Burnett of Leys.

== Origins of the name ==
It remains uncertain if the name of Burnett is of Saxon or Norman origins. It has been suggested that the name Burnett is derived from the Old French burnete, brunette, which is a diminutive of brun meaning "brown", "dark brown". Another proposed origin of the name is from burnete, a high quality wool cloth originally dyed to a dark brown colour. There is also evidence which suggests that Burnett stems from the English surname of Burnard, a derivative of the Anglo-Saxon name "Beornheard". Spelling variations of the name in early documents show Burnet and Burnard/Bernard being used interchangeably for the same family and at times for the same person. It is likely that the family of de Bernard first came to Scotland with the return of David I of Scotland and that they settled in Roxburghshire.

== Early Burnetts in Scotland ==
There is documented evidence of the family of Burnard in England from the Norman Conquest in 1066, but not before. These are found in the Domesday Book, the Chartulary of St Neots Priory and in charters concerning the Waltham Abbey. Roger Burnard was the Domesday tenant of Alrichesey and also held a manor in Rodedie hundred, Hampshire and the manors of Celdretone and Coteford in Wiltshire; all of which were held of William De Ow. He, his wife Margaret and his son Odo were named in several charters of St. Neot's and in one there is a mention of a daughter, Magilia Burnard. Among the English who came north in the train of David I of Scotland were Burnards who settled in the County of Roxburgh and owned the considerable barony of Farningdoun (aka. Fairnington). They were benefactors of Melrose Abbey and other religious houses. They soon move on to the Northeast of Scotland, where Alexander Burnard settled near Banchory. This Alexander Burnard is considered "The first of the Deeside Burnards, or Burnetts as they were later called".

=== Burnets of Farningdoun ===
c. 1200 Roger Burnard of Faringdoun gave two grants of land of that barony; one being witnessed by his sons Geoffrey, Walter, Ralph and Richard. Ralph, his son and heir appears in the Episcopal Records of Glasgow in 1208 as providing fuel in the form of peat to the Bishop of Glasgow. In 1252 Richard Burnard of Farningdoun sold the Eastmeadow of Faringdoun to the Abbey of Melrose, confirmed in a charter of Alexander III of Scotland that same year. After 1381 the link between the Burnards and Fairingdoun seems to have been lost.

=== Burnets of Burnetland and Barns ===
The Burnards or Burnets owned lands in Peeblesshire named for them, Burnetland. A Robert de Burnetland (Latin: Robertus de Burnetvilla) was a witness to the foundation charter of Selkirk Abbey by David I prior to his becoming king, and to several charters afterwards. An indicator of when this family became of Barns is from the will of William Burnet of Barns, Treasurer-Clerk of Scotland, dated 30 April 1656 stating that his predecessors had held Barns for three hundred years. This would date the family's connections to Barns to at least 1356. The genealogy of the Burnet family of Burnetland and Barns traces down to when the estate was sold in 1838. At times the family of Burnet of Barns and that of Leys have contended for the chiefship of the House of Burnet.

=== Burnard of Ardross and Currie ===
Thought to be originally of the Burnards of Farningdoun, John Burnard owned part of the lands of Ardross in Fife and of a part of those in Currie in Midlothian. He accompanied king David II of Scotland on his journey south in 1346 and in the attack on the fort of Liddell where John Burnard was severely wounded and left at Roxburgh Castle where he later died of his wounds. But before he died Roxburgh surrendered to the English and it was assumed John Burnard was a traitor who joined the English. As a result, his lands were forfeited and given to Alexander Maitland. When David II was released from captivity the truth was known and the lands were restored by royal charter to John Burnard's nearest kinsman, William of Dishington. The Dishington's continued ownership until about 1700 when the lands were sold.

== Burnetts in north-east Scotland ==
Burnetts who settled in the north-east of Scotland are primarily located in Kincardineshire and Aberdeenshire. These branches stemmed from the family of Leys, the ancestors of the present Chief of the Name of Burnett, James C. A. Burnett of Leys.

=== Burnett of Leys ===
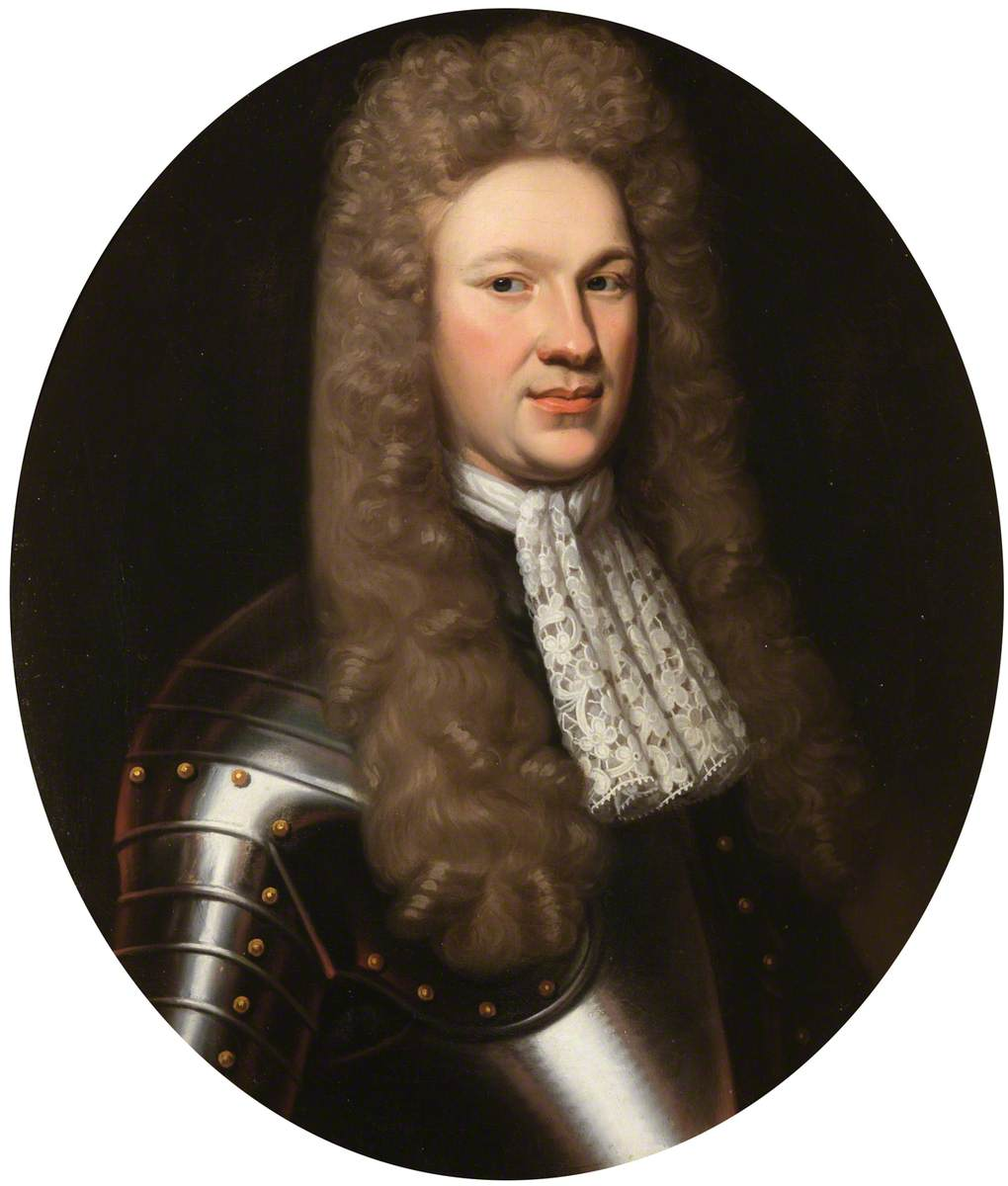
Sir Thomas Burnett of Leys, 3rd Bt and 15th Laird painted by John Scougal.

the coat of arms of James Comyn Amherst Burnett of Leys, Chief of the Name and Arms of Burnett, Baron of Leys and Kilduthie.

Alexander Burnard, almost certainly of Farningdoun, is considered "The first of the Deeside Burnards, or Burnetts as they were later called". Alexander was an adherent of Robert the Bruce and for his services to the king he was rewarded in 1323 with land in Banchory and a position as the Royal Forester of Drum. He also received a charter of that king of the lands of Kilhenach, Clerech, and other lands in Aberdeenshire dated 28 March 1324. This was about the time the Burnard or Burnett family first took up residence on an artificial island called a crannog, on the Loch of Leys.

The history of the family from this time onward is recorded in detail. During the next three centuries the Burnetts came to gain prominence in the area by making connections with the church, granting lands and other endowments. John Burnet "of Leyis", the fifth laird, was the first in this family to bear the distinction "of Leys" which from this time onward was applied both to the lands and to the family who held them. His son, Alexander Burnet of Leys was the first 'Baron of Leys' during the reigns of James II of Scotland, James III and James IV. In 1553, Alexander Burnet of Leys, the ninth lord of Leys began construction on Crathes Castle, which was finished by his great-grandson, another Alexander, the twelfth lord, in 1596. Alexander Burnett, 12th Laird of Leys (d. 1619), Laird of Crathes Castle, acquired Muchalls Castle about 1600 and commenced its early 17th-century reconstruction. Having died in 1619, the completion of Muchalls Castle was carried out by Alexander Burnett's son, Sir Thomas Burnett, 1st Baronet. Ownership of Muchalls Castle passed from the Burnett of Leys family about 1882. Crathes remained in the ownership of the Burnett family descendants for over 350 years, until 1952 when Sir James Burnett, 13th Baronet gave it to the National Trust for Scotland as part of Scotland's heritage.

==== Heraldic history ====
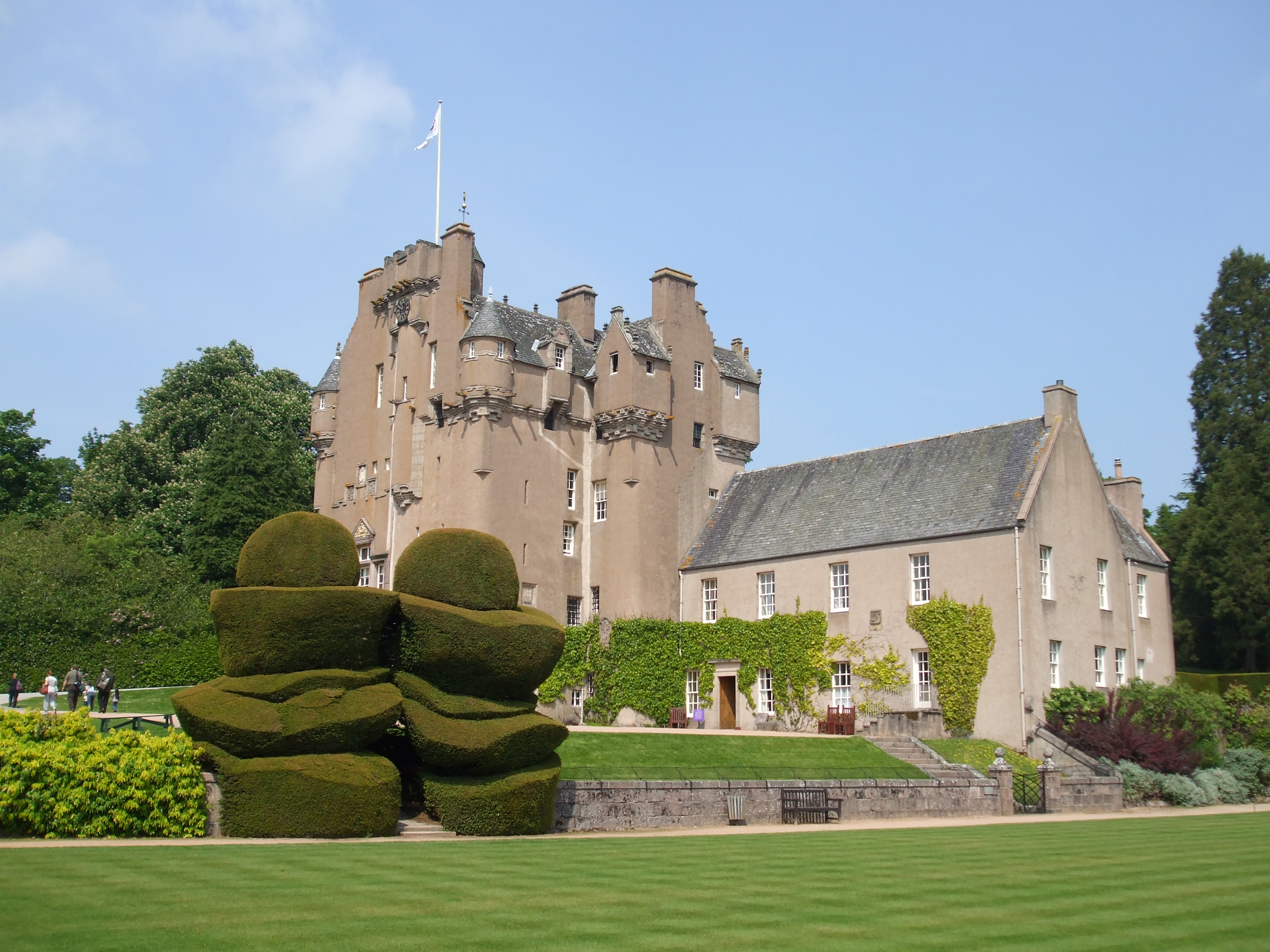
Crathes Castle, historic seat of the Burnett of Leys family.

There were no known seals for Burnett of Leys before 1621. In 1550 Burnet of Burnetland (later Barns) appealed to the then Lord Lyon King of Arms to change his motto to that already in use by Burnett of Leys, Virescit vulnere virtus (strength draws vigour from an injury). Apparently successful, the Burnett of Leys lord then began using the motto Alterius non sit qui potest esse suus (he would not be another's who could be his). The earliest arms for Burnett of Leys was found on a carved panel dated to some thirteen years later showing the impaled arms of Burnett and Hamilton commemorating the marriage between Alexander Burnett (1500–1574) and Janet Hamilton (d.1557). The arms of Burnett of Leys in 1553 used a shield, charged with three holly leaves and a hunting horn, blazoned: Argent, three holly leaves in chief vert and a hunting horn in base sable stringed Gules. The crest, a hand holding a knife shown pruning a vine had the motto: Alterius non sit qui potest esse suus (same meaning as above) or a marriage variant: Alterius non sit qui suis esse potest (who can be his would not be another's). The next progression was that of Thomas Burnett of Leys, knighted in 1620, whose seal of Bore a shield with holly leaves and hunting horn, set within foliage decoration with his name and rank but no crest or motto. By 1627 and upon completion of Muchalls Castle, the impaled arms of Sir Thomas Burnet and his second wife Janet Moncreiffe now had supporters. On the dexter side was a huntsman in contemporary dress with a hunting horn suspended from his shoulder while the sinister supporter was a greyhound with a collar. In addition to the current motto, displayed beneath the supporters, was the motto above the hand, knife and crest, apparently ignoring the ruling of 1550 by the Lord Lyon Sir David Lindsay, the previous Burnett motto: Virescit vulnere virtus.

In 1672 the Scottish Parliament decided to record every coat of arms in Scotland, a project that took over twenty years to complete just the first volume. Appearing in folio 122 in the first volume were the arms of Sir Thomas Burnett, 3rd Baronet (1663–1714). This version had no supporters and only one motto: virescit vulnere virtus.. In 1822 King George IV visited Scotland and encouraged by Sir Walter Scott highland chiefs were to appear before the king in their appropriate tartan. Many of these chiefs had no idea what their tartan was and a Mr. Wilson, a weaver of Bannockburn near Stirling was quick to come up with numerous designs which was the start of the commercial tartan industry in Scotland. In a petition to the Lord Lyon, Sir Thomas, the head of an established lowland house decided the Burnetts should be considered highlanders, possibly to impress the king, and petitioned the Lord Lyon to change the huntsman supporter to a highlander with kilt. This achievement was recorded in Folio 33, in the fourth volume of the Public Register of All Arms and Bearings in Scotland (24 October 1838).

The next significant change came one hundred and twenty-nine years later when the current head of the House of Burnett, James Comyn Amherst Burnett of Leys, Baron of Kilduthie, petitioned the Lord Lyon to confirm him as heir of the undifferenced arms of Burnett of Leys. The third matriculation of the Burnett arms were granted to him on 22 May 1967 with changes: a silver shield with three holly leaves, black hunting horn decorated in gold with a red strap, and the crest is a hand with a knife pruning a vine. The crest sits on a red baronial chapeau, symbolising the baronies of Leys and Kilduthie. Above the crest is the established motto: Verescit vulnere virtus and the kilt of the highlander supporter is the official Burnet of Leys tartan. The two supporters stand on a compartment (in the form of a grassy mound) with a ribbon bearing the motto: Alterius non sit qui suus esse potest not used since 1550.

Following a meeting of Burnett kin in 1993 the title was formally changed to the House of Burnett. A fourth petition was made to the Lord Lyon for a Standard and a Pinsel recognising the head of the house of Burnet which was duly granted.

The current Chief of the Name and Arms of Burnett, James C. A. Burnett, Baron of Leys and Kilduthie, arranged with the National Trust for Scotland for a room on the top floor of Crathes Castle to display items of interest for members of the Burnett family worldwide including armorial bearings.

=== Ramsays of Balmain ===
Paternally Burnetts
Through a marriage between Sir Thomas Burnett, 6th Baronet of Leys and the sister of Sir Alexander Ramsay, 6th Baronet of Balmain, the Burnetts became heirs of the line of Ramsay of Balmain. When Sir Alexander died in 1806 s.p. his estates passed to the immediate younger brother of his heir of that line, Alexander, second son of Sir Thomas Burnett of Leys. Alexander resigned the Sheriffdom of Kincardineshire on his succession to Balmain and after some time traveling he returned and built an elegant mansion called Fasque House. By Royal licence he assumed the name and arms of Ramsay and on 13 May 1806 he was created a Baronet of the United Kingdom as Sir Alexander Ramsay of Balmain. He died at Fasque on 17 May 1810 and his descendants retained the name of Ramsay dropping the surname of Burnett altogether.

=== Burnetts of Craigmyle ===
James Burnett, son of Alexander Burnett of Leys and next younger brother of Sir Thomas Burnett, 1st Baronet of Leys. Upon his marriage in 1608 to Elizabeth Burnet, daughter of Thomas Burnett of Craigmyle and Tillihaikie, the grandson of William Burnett of Craigour, Campbell and Tillihaikie who fell at the Battle of Pinkie Cleugh in 1547. He and his wife had sasine of the lands of Craigmyle, Pitmedden and the Mill of Craigmyle. By this marriage he became almost as considerable a laird as his brother Sir Thomas. He was known as a peacemaker and negotiator in his time. The cadet line of Craigmyle died out in the male line after 1750.

=== Burnetts of Crimond ===
This branch descends from Robert Burnet, Lord Crimond, another brother of Sir Thomas Burnett, 1st Baronet. He was the third son of Alexander Burnet, above-mentioned, and Katherine Gordon. Robert studied law in France for several years and in 1617 was admitted to the Scottish Bar. He was a Scottish advocate and Judge of the Court of Session in 1661 as Lord Crimond. His heir was his third son Alexander Burnett. His fifth son was Gilbert Burnet, Bishop of Salisbury.

=== Burnetts of Kemnay ===
James Burnett, the next younger brother of Sir Thomas Burnett, 1st Baronet, married Elizabeth Burnett as mentioned above. Their second son, Thomas Burnett of Kemnay was the first laird of Kemnay. Thomas was a writer in Edinburgh and married Margaret Pearson, daughter of John Pearson, a merchant in Edinburgh. He purchased Kemnay from Sir George Nicolson, Lord Kemnay, a Lord of Session in 1688. Thomas died in November 1688 and is buried in Kemnay parish church.

The older residence that the newer mansion replaced, was built by Sir Thomas Crombie, had been owned previously by the Auchinlecks and the Douglases of Glenbervie. The current laird of Kemnay is Susan Letitia Burnett, 9th of Kemnay. (Note: Susan Letitia Burnett, 9th Laird of Kemnay is the author of Without fanfare: the story of my family)

=== Burnetts of Monboddo ===
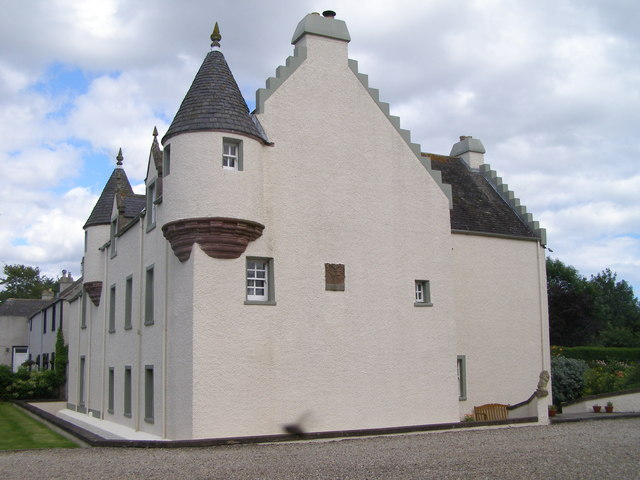
Monboddo House

This branch stems from James Burnet of Lagavin, the third son of James Burnett of Craigmyle and his wife Elizabeth Burnett. In 1642 James married Isobel Forbes who died a short time later after which James married secondly Elizabeth Irvine, daughter of Robert Irvine of Monboddo and Elizabeth Douglas of Glenbervie. About 1671 James purchased Monboddo from his brothers-in-law. In addition to Monboddo, which became the seat of this branch, James acquired Kair, Whitefield, Sillyflat, Hallgreen, Johnshaven and Ballandro in Kincardineshire and Aberdeenshire. His grandson, James Burnett, the third laird of Monboddo supported the Stuart cause and was captured at the Battle of Falkirk Muir. He was held prisoner for some time but was liberated through the influence of powerful friends. But subsequent events caused him to have to sell all but Monboddo and Lagavin, which he sold to his eldest son, James Burnett, Lord Monboddo, the fourth laird who rose to become an eminent scholar and judge.

=== Burnetts of Camphill ===
This branch is apparently descended from William Burnett of Craigour, Wester Camphill and Tillihaikie who fell at the Battle of Pinkie Cleugh in 1547. His son Andrew Burnett succeeded him to the lands of Camphill. In 1605 these lands were part of the Leys estate and at that time William Burnett, the son of Andrew Burnett held Camphill as a tenant. A Thomas Burnett of Camphill, mentioned in the Aberdeenshire Poll Book of 1696, was at the time living in Aberdeen.

=== Burnetts of Elrick ===
The eldest son of the abovementioned Andrew Burnett of Camphill, John Burnett (1625–1666) was the 1st of Elrick John Burnett acquired these lands by assignation from William Innes of Kinnermonie who had a charter for Elrick in 1663. The barony of Elrick included the lands of that estate, along with the mill and croft, Smiddieland and Broomiebrae of Elrick, the lands and town of Monacabback, Ord and Scrogley of Monacabback and the lands of Snellen. The lands were still in this family after the death of Peter Burnet of Elrick in 1870.

=== Burnetts of Kirkhill ===
The first of Kirkhill, in the parish of Dyce near Aberdeen, was Alexander Burnett (1620–1685), the son of Thomas Burnett, merchant, and his wife Margaret Johnston. As a Baillie of Aberdeen Alexander Burnett was designated Polls or Poles indicating a merchant with strong trading ties to Poland, a designation his son, the 2nd laird Thomas took as a nickname. The great granddaughter of the first laird, Margaret Burnett (born 1719) eventually succeeded to Kirkhill and by her marriage to Alexander Bannerman of Frendraught, also a merchant in Aberdeen, the lands of Kirkhill passed to the Bannerman family.

== Notable Burnet(t)s ==
- Gilbert Burnet (1643–1715), a Scottish historian, author, theologian and the Bishop of Salisbury. He was educated at Marischal College, Aberdeen where he studied law, divinity and history. In 1663 he was a probationer of the Scottish church and in 1664 he studied Hebrew in Amsterdam. Burnett was a professor of divinity at Glasgow in 1669 and was the king's chaplain to Charles II of England until he was dismissed by that monarch c. 1674. He was appointed the Bishop of Salisbury in 1689. The Bishop died in 1715.
- James Burnett, Lord Monboddo (1714–1799), a member of the Scottish bar he was appointed to the Court of Session where he assumed the title Lord Monboddo in 1767. He was the author of Of the Origin and Progress of Language (6 vol., 1773–92). Also the Decisions of the Court of Session 1738–60. His pre-Darwinian theories traced the origins of man to the orangutan earning him a reputation as an eccentric. Yet he was regarded as a cultured original thinker of great intellect.
- George Burnett (1822–1890), born at Kemnay, admitted to the Scottish bar in 1845, and appointed Lyon Depute at the Court of the Lord Lyon in 1863. In 1866 he became the Lord Lyon King of Arms which office he held until his death on 23 January 1890.
- Major-General Sir James Burnett, 13th Baronet was a colonel of the Gordon Highlanders and commanded a brigade during the World War I. He was awarded the Distinguished Service Order twice, mentioned in dispatches eleven times and was invested as a companion of the Order of the Bath by Britain and the Légion d'honneur by France.
- Charles Burnett (1940–2024), a Scottish antiquarian, museum curator, and officer of arms at the Court of the Lord Lyon. In 1983 he was appointed Dingwall Pursuivant of Arms, and from 1988–2010 he served as Ross Herald of Arms. In 2011 he became the Ross Herald of Arms Extraordinary which post he holds currently.
- Rear Admiral Philip Whitworth Burnett (10 October 1908 - 6 October 1996) was a Senior British Military Commander who served in the Royal Navy during the Second World War.
- Nicholas Ridley (c. 1500 – 16 October 1555) was an English Bishop of London and Westminster, related to the Burnett Family Clan.
- Air Chief Marshal Sir Charles Stuart Burnett (3 April 1882 - 9 April 1945), was a senior commander in the Royal Air Force during the first half of the 20th century. He was Air Officer Commanding Iraq Command during the early 1930s. During the Second World War, he served as Chief of the Air Staff of the Royal Australian Air Force
- Admiral Sir Robert Lindsay Burnett was an officer in the Royal Navy.

== Notable Descendants ==
- Diana, Princess of Wales (1961-1997)
- William, Prince of Wales (b.1982)
- Prince Harry, Duke of Sussex (b.1984)

== Family castle ==
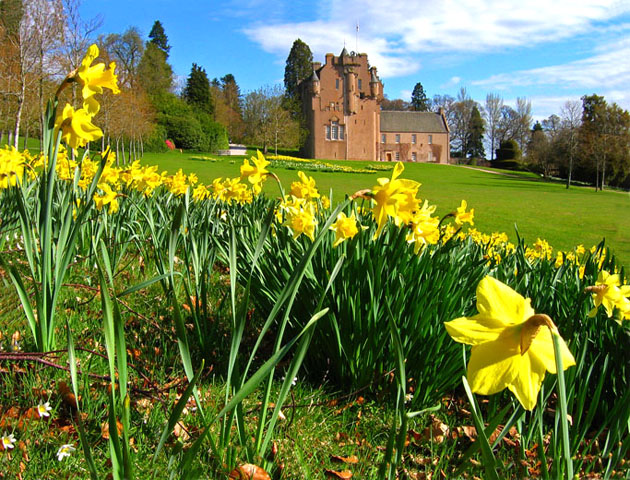
Crathes Castle in springtime

The Burnett family of the chiefly line now resides in the House of Crathes, close to Crathes Castle. In the early 17th century the Burnetts acquired Muchalls Castle.

== See also ==
- Burnett Baronets
- Crathes Castle
