= Alexander Burnett =

Alexander Burnett may refer to:

- Alexander Burnett of Leys (died 1619), Laird of Crathes Castle
- Alexander Burnett (figure skater) in 1961 U.S. Figure Skating Championships
- Alexander Burnett (politician) (born 1973), Member of the Scottish Parliament
- Alexander Burnett (musician), Australian singer, songwriter and music producer
- Sir Alexander Burnett, 2nd Baronet (died 1663) of the Burnett baronets
- Sir Alexander Burnett, 4th Baronet (died 1758) of the Burnett baronets
- Sir Alexander Burnett, 9th Baronet (1789–1856) of the Burnett baronets
- Sir Alexander Edwin Burnett, 14th Baronet (1881–1959) of the Burnett baronets

== See also ==
- Alex Burnett (born 1987), American baseball player
