= Sir Thomas Burnett, 3rd Baronet =

Sir Thomas Burnett of Leys, 3rd Baronet, (ca. 1658 – January 1714), Lord Clerk Register, PC, MP. He was, at Stonehaven, 21 April 1664, retoured as heir to his father, Sir Alexander Burnett, 2nd Baronet who had died the previous year. The 3rd Baronet is the grandson of Sir Thomas Burnett, 1st Baronet, who completed the reconstruction of Muchalls Castle and the great-grandson of Alexander Burnett of Leys (died 1619), who completed the construction of Crathes Castle.

== Career ==
Sir Thomas was a Commissioner to the Scottish Parliament for Kincardineshire between 1689 and 1707. In 1689 he subscribed to the Act declaratory of the legality of the Meeting of Estates summoned by the Prince of Orange, and was a signatory to the letter of congratulation him as King William II. In 1690 he was one of nine appointed to a Parliamentary Committee for the Plantation of Kirks and valuation of teinds, and one of four chosen as Lord Clerk Register. On the discovery of plots for the King's assassination, he was one of the signatories to the association in defence of King William.

He opposed the proposal of making an addition to the standing army, which parliament adopted; and in the same parliament, during the discussions regarding the colony of New Caledonia in Darién Province, when the question was raised whether the company's right should be made the subject of an address to the King or of an Act of Parliament, and the former alternative was carried by a majority of 108 to 84. Sir Thomas Burnett was one of the dissenters and protestors.

In May 1701 he was nominated, with others, for a peerage, but the King, being at the time ill, did not sign the patents, which subsequently lapsed. In 1703 Sir Thomas made a protest against the Act allowing the importation of French wines and brandies as "dishonourable to Her Majesty, and inconsistent with the Grand Alliance in which she is engaged." His votes recorded in connexion with the Union are in favour of the first article and of the whole measure as carried.

On 13 February 1707 he was elected as a Member of the Parliament of Great Britain at Westminster, but he seems never to have presented his commission or taken his seat. On 21 May he was appointed a member of the Privy Council of Scotland, and in July appointed to the Scottish Court of Exchequer.

== Acrimony ==
In his private life he was engaged in an unpleasant dispute, from 1695 to 1702, with the Earl of Sutherland regarding the affairs of the Arbuthnot family. The matter became very acrimonious and finally went to the Court of Session, the legal proceedings being reported upon by Sir John Lauder, Lord Fountainhall.

== Marriage and issue ==
He married while still under age, in 1677, Margaret (1662–1744), daughter of Robert Arbuthnot, 2nd Viscount Arbuthnot, by his spouse Elizabeth, daughter of William Keith, 7th Earl Marischal. They had sixteen (or even more) children.

Sir Thomas was succeeded in the baronetcy by his son and heir Sir Alexander Burnett, 4th Baronet. Of the other children:

- William of Criggie (now Ecclesgreig) (1683–1747).
- Robert, was made an honorary burgess of Aberdeen on 8 January 1689.
- Thomas (b.1686) was made an honorary burgess of Aberdeen on 8 January 1689.
- John (b. 1688) was made an honorary burgess of Aberdeen on 8 January 1689.
- Charles (b.1691; d.unm.), an advocate.
- Katherine (d.1749), married in 1702 Sir William Seton, 2nd Baronet of Pitmedden, M.P. (bap.6 Mar 1673; d.1744).
- Mary (d.5 Jun 1754), married in 1712 Sir John Carnegie, 2nd Baronet of Pittarrow, (1673–1729).
- Elizabeth (b.1692) married by contract in 1715 George Beattie, merchant in Montrose, Angus.
- Margaret (b.1696) married in 1721 James Ogilvie of Melros, Banffshire.
- Jean (b.1698) married in 1722 George Lauder of Pitscandlie, Forfarshire (d.bef August 1760), a younger son of Sir Robert Lauder of Beilmouth, Knt., M.P. (d.1709)
- Helen (b.1698) married Allardice of that Ilk.

Parliament of Scotland
Preceded by Sir Alexander Falconer; William Rait	Shire Commissioner for Kincardine; 1689–1707; With: Alexander Arbuthnott 1689–1702; Sir James Falconer 1702–1705; Sir David Ramsay 1705–1707	Succeeded by Parliament of Great Britain
Parliament of Great Britain
Preceded by Parliament of Scotland	Member of Parliament for Scotland; 1707–1708; With: 44 others	Succeeded by Sir David Ramsay (as MP for Kincardineshire)
Baronetage of Nova Scotia
Preceded by Alexander Burnett	Baronet (of Leys); 1663–1714	Succeeded by Alexander Burnett
