= Rob Burnett =

Rob Burnett may refer to:

- Rob Burnett (American football), a former defensive end who played in the NFL from 1990 to 2003
- Rob Burnett (producer), a producer, director and writer, best known for being the executive producer of Late Show with David Letterman

== See also ==
- Robert Burnett (disambiguation)
