= Kincardineshire (Parliament of Scotland constituency) =

Constituency of the Old Parliament of Scotland

- Former constituency for the Parliament of Scotland

Former constituency
- Abolished: 1707

Kincardineshire (or the Mearns) was a constituency represented in the Parliament of Scotland until 1707.

== List of shire commissioners ==
- 1607: Laird of Allerdes (Allerdes)
- 1612: John Allerdes, friar of that Ilk
- 1612, 1625, 1630: David Ramsay of Balmain
- 1617 and 1630: Sir Alexander Strachan of Thornton
- 1621: Alexander Burnett of Leys
- 1639–41, 1645–46, 1661–63: Sir Gilbert Ramsay of Balmain
- 1661–63: Alexander Stratton of that Ilk and of Lowrieston
- 1665 convention: not represented
- 1667, 1669–74: Sir David Carnegie of Pitarrow
- 1672–73: Sir David Ramsay of Balmain
- 1678 (convention), 1681–82, 1685–86 Sir Alexander Falconer of Glenfarquhar
- 1678 (convention), 1681–82, 1685–86: Sir John Falconer of Balnakellie (died c.1685)
- 1686 William Rait, Laird of Hallgreen
- 1689 (convention), 1689–1702 Alexander Arbuthnott of Knox
- 1689 (convention), 1689–1701, 1702–1707: Sir Thomas Burnett of Leys
- 1702–04: Sir James Falconer of Phesdoe (died 1705)
- 1705–07: Sir David Ramsay of Balmain
