= Robert Burnet, Lord Crimond =

Scottish advocate and judge

Robert Burnet, Lord Crimond (1592 – 24 August 1661) was a Scottish advocate and judge.

== Background ==
He was the fourth son of Alexander Burnett of Leys by his wife Katherine, daughter of Alexander Gordon of Lesmoir, and younger brother of Sir Thomas Burnett, 1st Baronet. Crimond studied for seven years in France, and was admitted a Scottish advocate on 20 February 1617.

== Career ==
His career at the Bar was so successful, that in 1628 he acquired Banachtie and Mill of Bourtie from William Seton of Meldrum, and, in 1634, Crimond, in Aberdeenshire, which afterwards became his residence. He refused to subscribe to the Solemn League and Covenant, and as a consequence spent several years in exile in Paris from 1637. In that year he wrote to his brother-in-law, Archibald Johnston of Warristoun, protesting against the injustice of the sentence passed upon the bishop Thomas Sydserf.

After his return he was urged by Oliver Cromwell to act as a judge, but declined, and lived in retirement on his estate at Crimond until the restoration of King Charles II of England. He was nominated a Senator of the College of Justice on 19 January 1661 and took his seat in the Court of Session under the judicial title Lord Crimond on 1 June, an office he enjoyed scarcely three months before dying at Edinburgh on 24 August.

== Marriage ==
Crimond married twice: firstly in 1620, Beatrix, youngest daughter and co-heir of William Maule of Glaster, son of Sir Robert Maule of Panmure, by whom he had a daughter, Bethia (1622–1624). After her death in 1622, he remarried secondly Rachel, daughter of James Johnston, a merchant in Edinburgh, by his spouse Elizabeth, daughter of Sir Thomas Craig, and sister of Archibald Johnston, Lord Warriston. Crimond's issue by his second wife, with three daughters, included Robert (1630–1662), who, admitted to the Scottish bar 1656, died unmarried, Thomas Burnet (1638-1704), physician successively to four English sovereigns, and the noted historian and bishop Gilbert Burnet (1643-1715).

== Legacy ==
Upon his death, Alexander Brodie of Brodie paid the following diary tribute to his memory: ..."27 August 1661. I heard that the good Mr Robert Burnet, Crimond, was removed by death; 'The righteous are taken away and perishing, none considering or laying it to hart, that they are taken away from the euel to come"...

His grandson Thomas Burnet gave the following description of his character ..."His excessive modesty so far depressed his abilities, that he never made a showy figure at the bar, though he was universally esteemed a man of judgement and knowledge in his profession; he was eminent for probity and generosity in his practice; in so much that nearly one half of it went in acts of charity and friendship; from the poor he never took a fee, nor from a clergyman when he sued in the right of his church"...
