= General Burnett =

General Burnett may refer to:

- Charles Burnett (British Army officer) (1843–1915), British Army general
- Charles Burnett (RAF officer) (1882–1945), Royal Air Force general
- Henry Lawrence Burnett (1838–1916), Union Army brevet brigadier general
- Sir James Burnett, 13th Baronet (1880–1953), British Army major general

== See also ==
- John Burnett-Stuart (1875–1958), British Army general
