= Ramsay baronets of Balmain (second creation, 1806) =

The Ramsay baronetcy, of Balmain in the County of Kincardine, was created in the Baronetage of the United Kingdom on 13 May 1806 for Alexander Ramsay (surname at birth Burnett).

Alexander Burnett was the second son of Catherine Ramsay, the granddaughter of Sir Charles Ramsay, 3rd Baronet of Balmain of the earlier creation (1625) in the Baronetage of Nova Scotia, which was inherited by her brother, Sir Alexander Ramsay-Irvine, 6th Baronet. Catherine Ramsay married Sir Thomas Burnett of Leys, 6th Baronet, and their eldest son, Robert, inherited the Burnett baronetcy, while their second son, Alexander Burnett, was his maternal uncle's namesake and heir. Sir Alexander Ramsay, 6th Baronet bequeathed his estates to his nephew and the baronetcy was revived in favour of Burnett a few months after Sir Alexander's death, who changed his surname to Ramsay by royal licence.

The second Baronet sat as Member of Parliament for MP for Kincardineshire. The third Baronet was Member of Parliament for Rochdale. The seventh and present Baronet is the presumed heir to the dormant Burnett Baronetcy of Leys.

William Alexander Ramsay, eldest son of Captain Francis Ramsay, third son of the second Baronet, was a brigadier-general in the British Army. His son Sir Bertram Ramsay was an admiral in the Royal Navy.

== Ramsay baronets, of Balmain (1806) ==
Ramsay baronets of Balmain
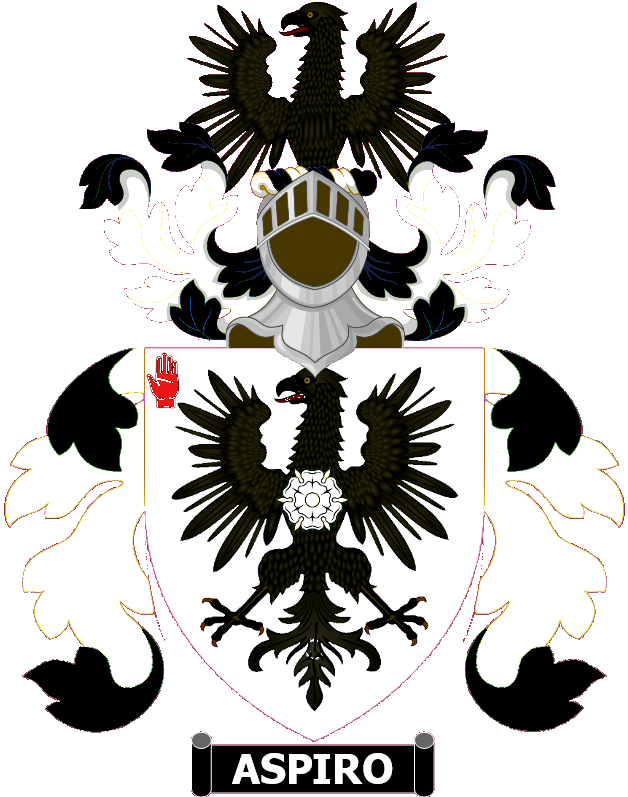
- Crest: A demi-eagle displayed Sable.
- Shield: Argent an eagle displayed Sable and charged on the breast with a rose of the field.
- Motto: Aspiro

- Sir Alexander Burnett Ramsay, 1st Baronet (1757–1810)
- Sir Alexander Ramsay, 2nd Baronet (1785–1852)
- Sir Alexander Ramsay, 3rd Baronet (1813–1875)
- Sir Alexander Entwisle Ramsay, 4th Baronet (1837–1902)
- Sir Herbert Ramsay, 5th Baronet (1868–1924)
- Sir Alexander Burnett Ramsay, 6th Baronet (1903–1965)
- Sir Alexander William Burnett Ramsay, 7th Baronet (born 1938).

The heir apparent to the baronetcy is Alexander David Ramsay of Balmain (born 1966), eldest of three sons of the 7th Baronet.

== Notes ==
Baronetage of the United Kingdom
Preceded by Morris baronets	Ramsay baronets of Balmain; 13 May 1806	Succeeded by Lockhart baronets
