= Robert Burnett (disambiguation) =

Robert Burnett was a naval officer.

Robert Burnett may also refer to:

- Robert Meyer Burnett (born 1967), filmmaker and DVD producer
- Rob Burnett (American football) (born 1967), former defensive end
- Rob Burnett (producer) (born 1962), producer, director and writer
- Bobby Burnett (1943–2016), American football player
- Sir Robert Burnett, 5th Baronet (died 1759) of the Burnett baronets
- Sir Robert Burnett, 7th Baronet (1755–1837) of the Burnett baronets
- Sir Robert Burnett, 11th Baronet (1833–1894) of the Burnett baronets

== See also ==
- Robert Burnet, Lord Crimond (1592–1661)
- Burnett (surname)
