= Norman Lockhart =

Norman Lockhart may refer to:

- Norman Lockhart (politician) (1884–1974), Canadian businessman and politician
- Norman Lockhart (footballer) (1924–1993), footballer from Northern Ireland
- Norman Lockhart (priest), dean of Dromore
- Sir Norman Macdonald Lockhart, 3rd Baronet (1802–1849), of the Lockhart baronets of Lee
- Sir Norman Macdonald Lockhart, 4th Baronet (1845–1870), of the Lockhart baronets of Lee

== See also ==
- Norman Lockhart Smith (1887–1968), British colonial administrator
- Lockhart Township, Norman County, Minnesota
