= Morris baronets of Clasemont (1806) =

The Morris baronetcy, of Clasemont in the County of Glamorgan, was created in the Baronetage of the United Kingdom on 12 May 1806 for the copper and coal magnate, John Morris. The 1st baronet had founded Morriston, the industrial suburb of Swansea, which was overlooked by the family seat at Clasemont. This residence was later knocked down and the stones were incorporated into a new family house at Sketty Park.

The fifth baronet died without heirs and was succeeded by his uncle, the sixth baronet. The sixth baronet was succeeded by his nephew, the seventh baronet; he also died without issue, upon which the line of descent from the third baronet failed. The seventh baronet was succeeded by his first cousin once removed, the eighth baronet, George Lockwood Morris; aged 88, he was the son of George Byng Morris, second son of the second baronet. The 8th baronet had been a local industrialist and a Welsh international rugby player; he held the title for three months and was succeeded by his son, the painter and horticulturalist Cedric Morris, as the ninth baronet. He died without heirs and was succeeded by his second cousin, Robert Byng Morris.

As of 2023 the baronetcy is considered dormant.

== Morris baronets, of Clasemont (1806) ==
Morris baronets of Clasemont
- Crest: A lion rampant or charged on the shoulder with a cross couped gules within a chain in the form of an arch or.
- Shield: Sable on a saltire engrailed ermine a bezant charged with a cross couped gules.
- Motto: Scuto fidei (By the shield of faith)

- Sir John Morris, 1st Baronet (1745–1819)
- Sir John Morris, 2nd Baronet (1775–1855)
- Sir John Armine Morris, 3rd Baronet (1813–1893)
- Sir Robert Armine Morris, 4th Baronet (1848–1927)
- Sir Tankerville Robert Armine Morris, 5th Baronet (1892–1937)
- Sir George Cecil Morris, 6th Baronet (1852–1940)
- Sir Herbert Edward Morris, 7th Baronet (1884–1947)
- Sir George Lockwood Morris, 8th Baronet (1859–1947)
- Sir Cedric Lockwood Morris, 9th Baronet (1889–1982)
- Sir Robert Byng Morris, 10th Baronet (1913–1999)
- Sir Allan Lindsay Morris, 11th Baronet (1961–2016)
- Sir Sennen John Morris, 12th Baronet (b. 1995). His name does not appear on the Official Roll of the Baronetage.

The heir apparent is the present holder's brother Chace James Morris (born 1997).

== Notes ==
Baronetage of the United Kingdom
Preceded by Scott baronets	Morris baronets of Clasemont; 12 May 1806	Succeeded by Ramsay baronets
