= Ramsay baronets =

Set index for Ramsay baronets

There have been five baronetcies created for members of Clan Ramsay, four in the Baronetage of Nova Scotia and one in the Baronetage of the United Kingdom. The baronetcy in the Baronetage of the United Kingdom is extant as of 2026.

- Ramsay baronets of Balmain (first creation, 1625)
- Ramsay baronets of Whitehill (1665)
- Ramsay baronets of Bamff (1666)
- Ramsay baronets of Abbotshall (1669): see Sir Andrew Ramsay, 1st Baronet
- Ramsay baronets of Balmain (second creation, 1806)

== See also ==
- Ramsay-Steel-Maitland baronets
- Ramsay-Fairfax-Lucy baronets
- Burnett baronets
