= Sir Andrew Ramsay, 1st Baronet =

Scottish politician

Sir Andrew Ramsay, 1st Baronet (died 17 January 1668) was a Scottish politician.

== Life ==
He was the eldest son of Sir Andrew Ramsay of Abbotshall, and was created a baronet on 23 June 1669. He represented North Berwick at the Convention of Burghs in 1669, and sat for the burgh in the Parliament of 1669 to 1674. In 1671 he had a charter of the lands of Wauchton, and was known as Ramsay of Wauchton thereafter. His first wife, Margaret Hepburn, died in 1672, and in 1675 he was married to Anne, daughter of Hugh Montgomerie, 7th Earl of Eglinton. They had one son, Andrew, who succeeded to the baronetcy on his father's death abroad in 1679, and to the lands of Abbotshall on his grandfather's death in 1688.

Baronetage of Nova Scotia
New creation	Baronet (of Abbotshall); 1669–1679	Succeeded by Andrew Ramsay
