= Alexander Arbuthnot (politician) =

Scottish politician

Alexander Arbuthnot, Snr (c. 1654–1705) of Knox, Kincardineshire was a Scottish politician.

He was the second son of Robert Arbuthnott, 1st Viscount of Arbuthnott. He served as tutor to the children of his brother Robert Arbuthnot, 2nd Viscount of Arbuthnott.

He represented Kincardineshire as Commissioner to the Parliament of Scotland from 1689 to 1702.

He married firstly Margaret Barclay and secondly Jean Scott.

He should not be confused with Alexander Arbuthnot, an advocate and Provost who represented Bervie from 1703 to 1707.^{(p. 174)}

Parliament of Scotland
Preceded by Sir Alexander Falconer; William Rait	Shire Commissioner for Kincardine; 1689–1702; With: Sir Thomas Burnett	Succeeded by Sir James Falconer; Sir Thomas Burnett
