= Ramsay baronets of Balmain (first creation, 1625) =

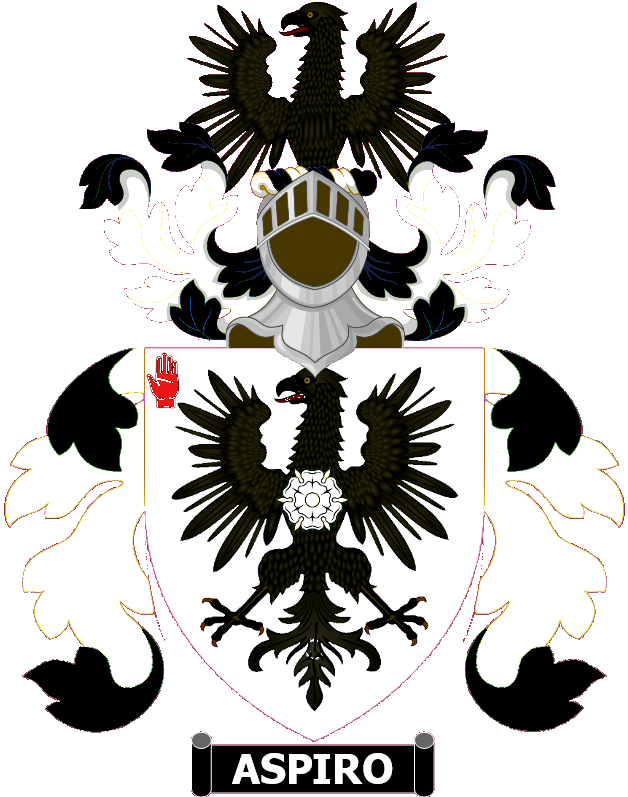
Coat of arms of the Ramsay baronets of Balmain

The Ramsay baronetcy, of Balmaine in the County of Kincardineshire, was created in the Baronetage of Nova Scotia on 3 September 1625 for Gilbert Ramsay, the son of David Ramsay (died 1636) and Margaret Ogilvie, daughter of Sir Gilbert Ogilvie of Ogilvie. David Ramsay was MP for Kincardineshire in the Parliament of Scotland and the grandson of John Ramsay, Lord Bothwell. The fourth Baronet was one of the Scottish representatives to the 1st Parliament of Great Britain and subsequently sat for Kincardineshire in the British Parliament. The fifth and sixth Baronets also represented Kincardineshire in the House of Commons. The latter assumed the additional surname of Irvine. Alexander Ramsay-Irvine, the 6th Baronet, died without sons 11 February 1806, at which point the Nova Scotia baronetcy either became extinct or dormant (though two relatives styled themselves as the next baronet, without proving parentage).

== Ramsay, later Ramsay-Irvine baronets, of Balmain (1625) ==
- Sir Gilbert Ramsay, 1st Baronet (died c. 1663)
- Sir David Ramsay, 2nd Baronet (died 1673)
- Sir Charles Ramsay, 3rd Baronet (died 1695)
- Sir David Ramsay, 4th Baronet (died 1710)
- Sir Alexander Ramsay, 5th Baronet (c. 1679–1754)
- Sir Alexander Ramsay-Irvine, 6th Baronet (died 1806)
