= Sir David Ramsay, 4th Baronet =

Scottish politician

Sir David Ramsay, 4th Baronet (after 1673 – by 1 September 1710), of Balmain, Kincardine, was a Scottish politician who sat in the Parliament of Scotland from 1705 to 1707 and in the British House of Commons from 1707 to 1710.

Ramsay was son of Sir Charles Ramsay, 3rd Baronet, of Balmain, Kincardineshire. He was educated at Aberdeen Grammar School and attended Marischal College, Aberdeen from 1693 to 1697. He succeeded to his father's baronetcy in 1695 while at the university.

Ramsay contested Kincardine in 1702 unsuccessfully, but was returned as Shire Commissioner in 1705. He was a supporter of the Country party, and was initially an opponent of the Union. He was often absent from Parliament and was inconsistent when he did vote. In 1707 he was one of the Scottish representatives to the first Parliament of Great Britain. At the 1708 British general election, he was returned as Member of Parliament for Kincardineshire. In response to a petition from Kincardineshire freeholders to place Scottish J.P.s on the same footing as English J.P.s (and excuse the Scots from a 'slavish and unnecessary attendance' on circuit courts), he took charge of a bill during January and February 1709.

While arranging his marriage, Ramsay was accidentally killed in a fall from his horse on or before 1 September 1710. He was succeeded in his baronetcy by his brother Alexander.

Parliament of Scotland
Preceded by Sir James Falconer; Sir Thomas Burnett	Shire Commissioner for Kincardine; 1705–1707; With: Sir Thomas Burnett	Succeeded by Parliament of Great Britain
Parliament of Great Britain
Preceded by Parliament of Scotland	Member of Parliament for Scotland; 1707–1708; With: 44 others	Succeeded by Himself (as MP for Kincardineshire)
New constituency	Member of Parliament for Kincardineshire; 1708–1710	Succeeded by Sir Alexander Ramsay
Baronetage of Nova Scotia
Preceded by Charles Ramsay	Baronet (of Balmain); 1695-1710	Succeeded by Alexander Ramsay
