= Thomas Burnet (physician) =

Scottish physician (1638–1704)

Sir Thomas Burnet (1638–1704) was a Scottish physician, known for his appointment to successive English monarchs, and as an author in the tradition of Early Modern learned medicine.

== Life ==
A younger son of Robert Burnet, Lord Crimond and his second wife Rachel Johnston, he was a brother of Gilbert Burnet, the noted historian and Bishop of Salisbury. He studied and graduated in medicine at the University of Montpellier, when already M.A., and the theses which he defended for his degree on 26–28 August 1659 show that his medical knowledge was mainly based on Galen and Hippocrates. He returned to Edinburgh and practised there.

Burnet is named in the original charter of the Royal College of Physicians of Edinburgh, granted in 1681, as a fellow. He was physician to Charles II, James II, William and Mary and Queen Anne.

Burnet was knighted sometime before 1691. His son, Thomas Burnet, graduated M.D. at the University of Leyden in 1691.

== Works ==
Burnet's reputation was spread by his books, especially the Thesaurus Medicinæ, often reprinted, a compendium of the knowledge of the time. An abridgement was published by the author himself in 1703. His Hippocrates Contractus is an abridgement in Latin of the most important works of Hippocrates. He wrote also:

- ‘Currus Iatrikus triumphalis, &c. … ad Apollinarem laudem consequendam’ (theses for obtaining a license), Montpellier 1659.
- ‘Quæstiones quatuor cardinales pro supremâ Apollinari daphne consequenda,’ also 1659, for his doctor's degree.
- ‘Thesaurus Medicinæ practicæ ex præstantissimorum medicorum observationibus collectus,’ London, 1672 and later editions, one in French (1691) by Daniel Puerarius of Geneva.

== Notes ==
Attribution

This article incorporates text from a publication now in the public domain: Stephen, Leslie, ed. (1886). "Burnet, Thomas (1632?-1715?)". Dictionary of National Biography. Vol. 7. London: Smith, Elder & Co.
