= Crathes Castle =

16th-century castle in north-east Scotland

- near Banchory, Aberdeenshire, Scotland
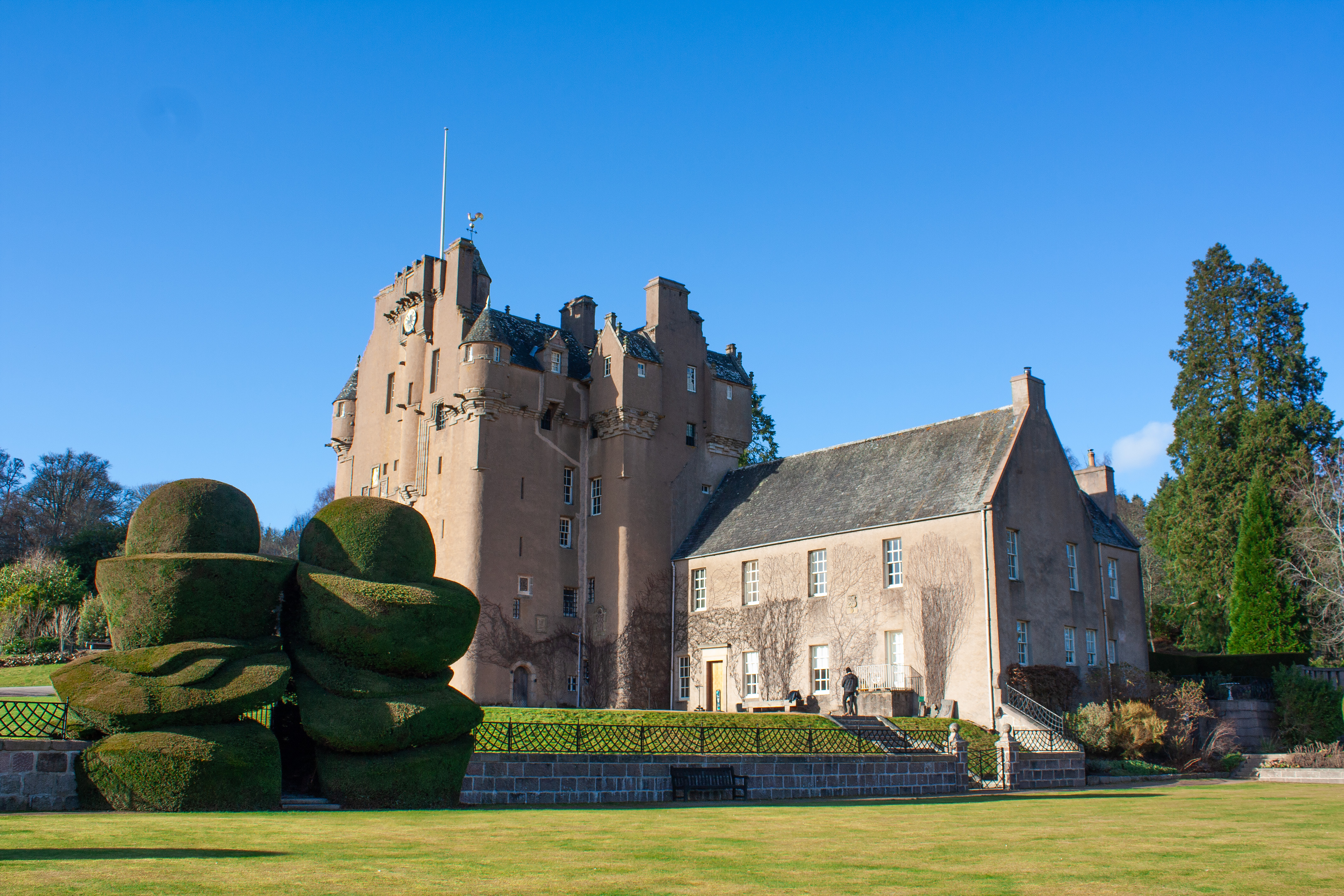
- Crathes Castle in 2025

Site information
- Owner: National Trust for Scotland
- Open to the public: yes

Inventory of Gardens and Designed Landscapes in Scotland
- Official name: Crathes Castle
- Designated: 1 July 1987
- Reference no.: GDL00119

Location
- Location in Aberdeenshire, Scotland
- Location within Aberdeenshire
- Coordinates: 57.061483°N 2.439917°W

Site history
- Built: 16th century

Crathes Castle (pronounced /ˈkræθɪs/ KRATH-iss) is a castle built in the 16th century, near Banchory in Aberdeenshire, Scotland. It is in the historic county of Kincardineshire. This harled castle was built by the Burnetts of Leys and was owned by the family for almost 400 years. The castle and its grounds are currently owned and managed by the National Trust for Scotland and are open to the public.

== History ==
Crathes sits on land given as a gift to the Burnetts of Ley family by King Robert the Bruce in 1323.

In the 14th and 15th centuries, the Burnett of Leys built a fortress of timbers on an island they made in the middle of a nearby bog. This method of fortification, known as a crannog, was common in the Late Middle Ages. Construction of the current tower house of Crathes Castle was begun in 1553 but delayed several times during its construction due to political problems during the reign of Mary, Queen of Scots.

It was completed in 1596 by Alexander Burnett of Leys, and an additional wing added in the 18th century. Alexander Burnett, who completed the construction of Crathes, began a new project, the early 17th-century reconstruction of nearby Muchalls Castle. That endeavour was completed by his son, Sir Thomas Burnett.

In 1877, Sir Robert Burnett transformed the Great Hall by adding oak panelling and gilded leather in a faux-medieval style, to satisfy his New York wife Matilda and her guests that they were living in a truly old structure. Robert also purchased a whole new suite of furnishings for the entire structure of both antique and faux antique style as he thought befitted the house. Several painted beam ceilings, long covered by Georgian plasterwork, were re-exposed in 1913 during construction works (they had been spotted during the 1877 works and recovered).

Crathes Castle served as the ancestral seat of the Burnetts of Leys until Sir James Burnett, 13th Baronet gave it to the National Trust for Scotland in 1951. The family continued to live in the house.

The Great Hall was stripped back to its bare stone walls in 1953.

Another historically important structure in this region linked to the Burnett of Leys family is Monboddo House.

== Fire ==
A fire damaged portions of the castle (in particular the Queen Anne wing) on 6 January 1966.

After the fire the laird, James Cecil Burnett was limited to the use of "a stump of the service wing" as his actual residence. The quarters and possessions of the on-site National Trust representative, Miss Jean Dodds, were wholly destroyed. It was decided by the National Trust's resident architect Schomberg Scott that the Queen Anne wing should be rebuilt to its original height of two storeys and that the Victorian wing should be wholly demolished.

The insurance company paid £65,000; half of which was used to build the Burnetts a new house detached from the castle.

== Interior ==
The castle contains a significant collection of portraits, and intriguing original Scottish renaissance painted ceilings survive in several Jacobean rooms: the Chamber of the Muses, the Chamber of Nine Worthies and the Green Lady's Room.

Original furniture still in the house and on display includes a carved bed and two caquetoire chairs dating from 1597 and bearing the owners' initials and heraldry.

== Garden and grounds ==
The castle estate is 240 hectares (590 acres; 2.4 km^{2}) and contains 210 ha (530 acres; 2.1 km^{2}) of woodlands and fields, including nearly 1.5 ha (4 acres; 16,187.5 m^{2}) of walled garden. Within the walled garden are gravel paths with surrounding specimen plants, mostly in herbaceous borders. Many of the plants are labelled with taxonomic descriptions. There is also a grass croquet court at a higher terraced level within the walled garden. Ancient topiary hedges of Irish yew dating from 1702 separate the gardens into eight themed areas. Red squirrels can at times be seen in the garden.

Crathes and its grounds are open to tourists throughout the year. A visitor centre provides information about the castle and its surroundings. There is a tea shop on site and a car park.

== Mesolithic calendar ==
In 2004 excavations at the castle uncovered a series of pits believed to date from about 10,000 years ago. The find was analysed in 2013 and is considered to be the world's oldest known lunar calendar dating from 8000 BC to about 4000 BC. This dating would make the structure up to five thousand years older than previously recorded time-measuring monuments in Mesopotamia.

The site of Warren Field was identified from aerial photography when unusual crop marks were seen by the Royal Commission on the Ancient and Historical Monuments of Scotland.

== Gallery ==
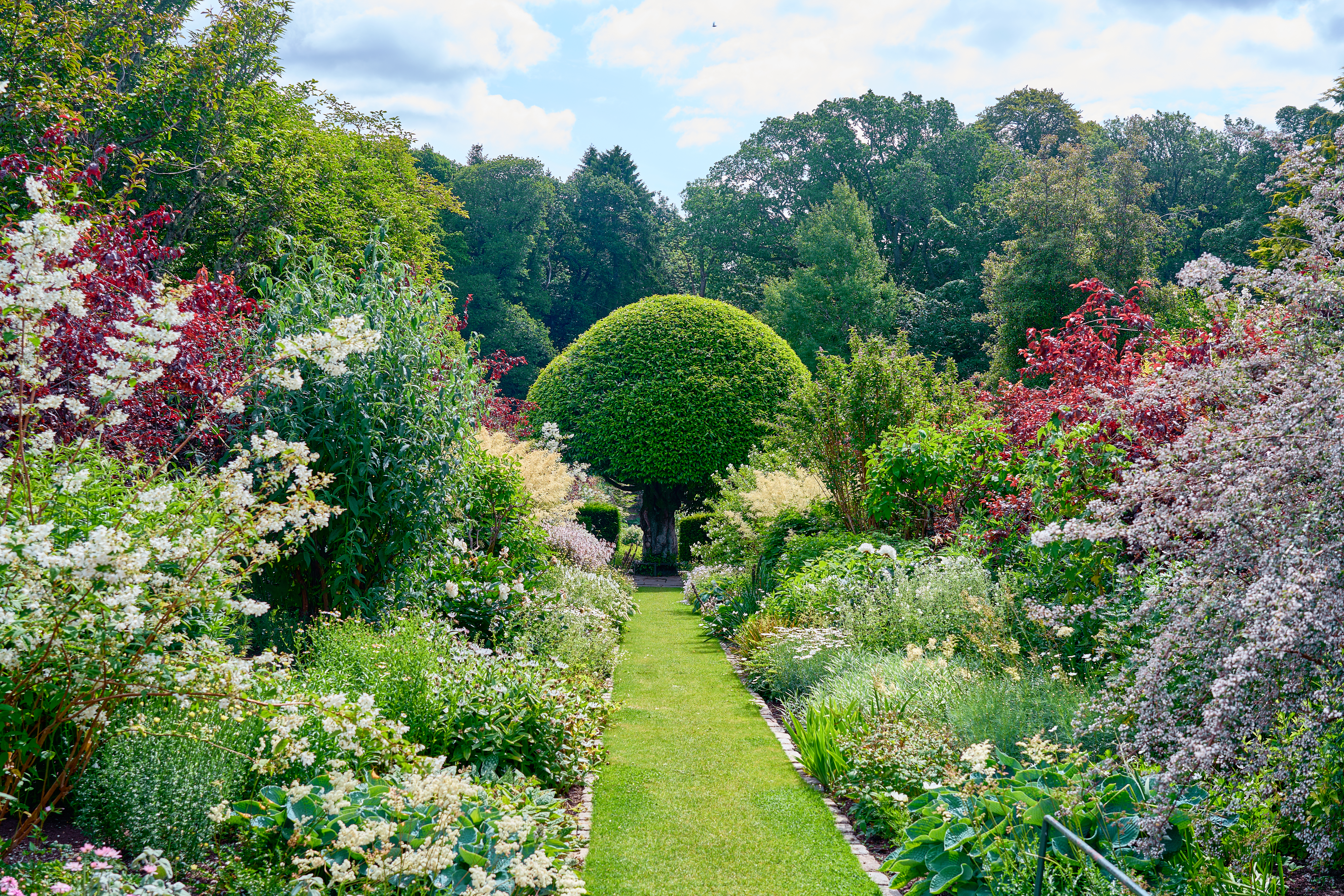
The castle gardens (2025)

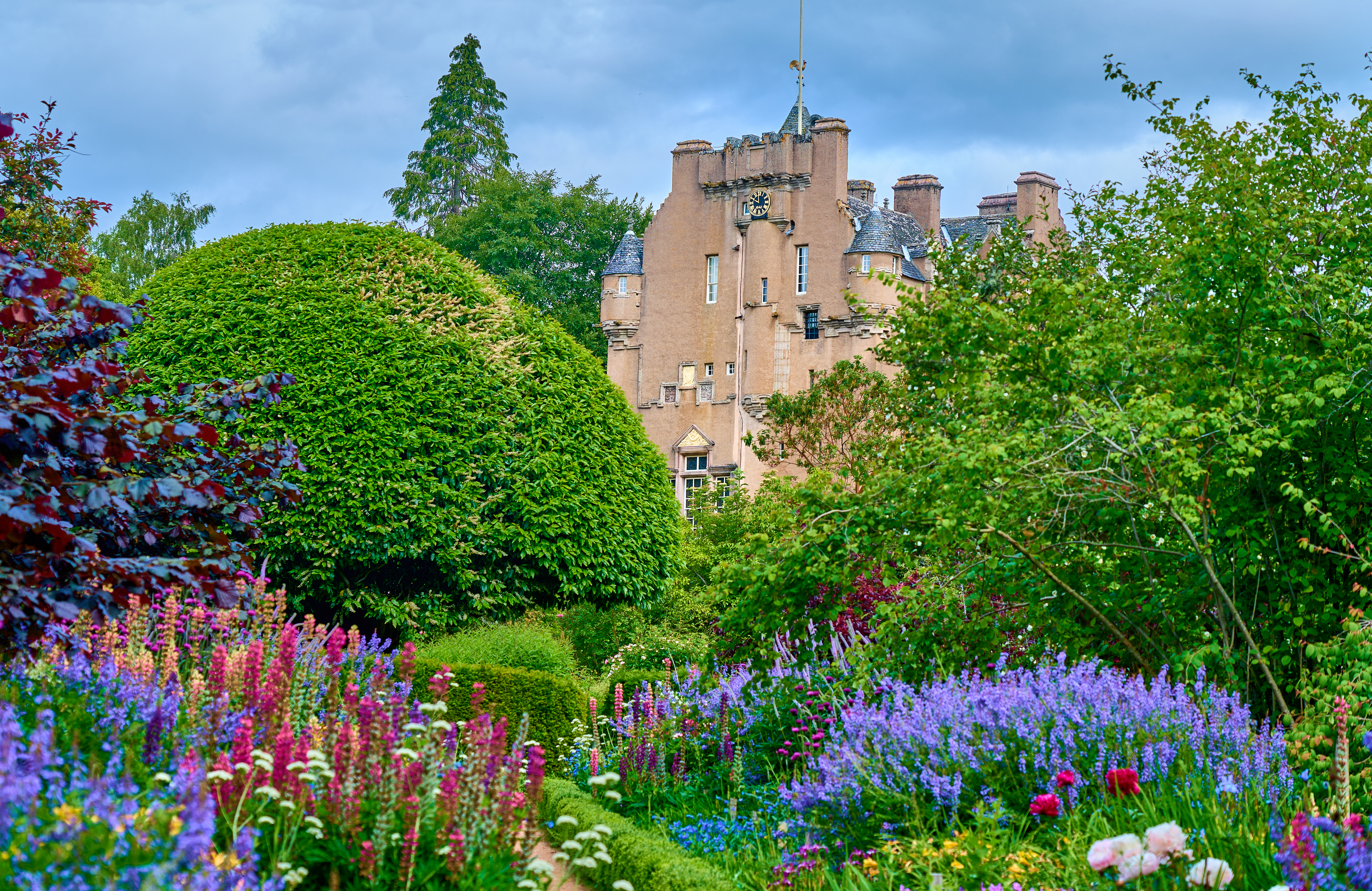
The castle seen from the gardens (2025)

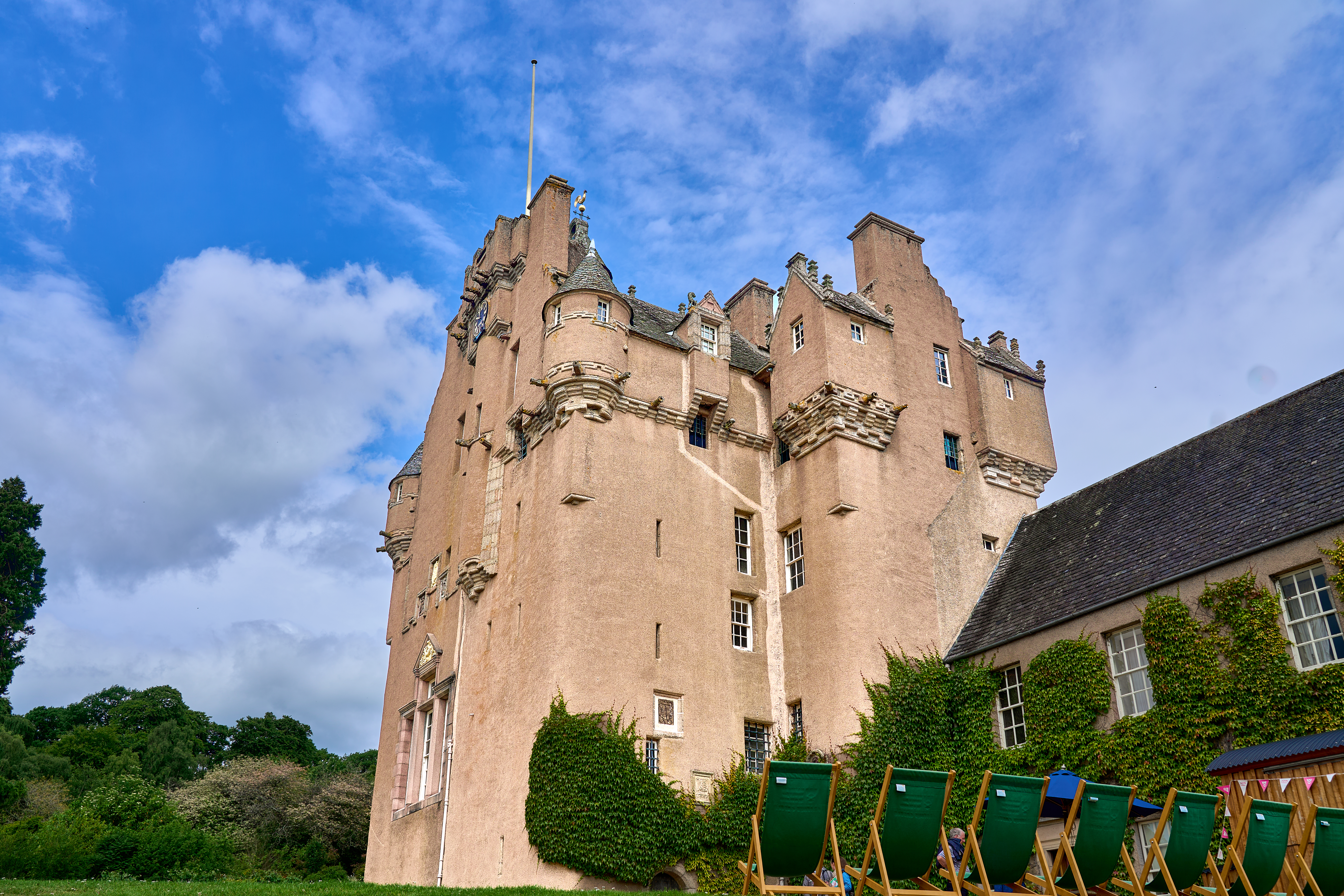
The castle seen from the gardens (2025)

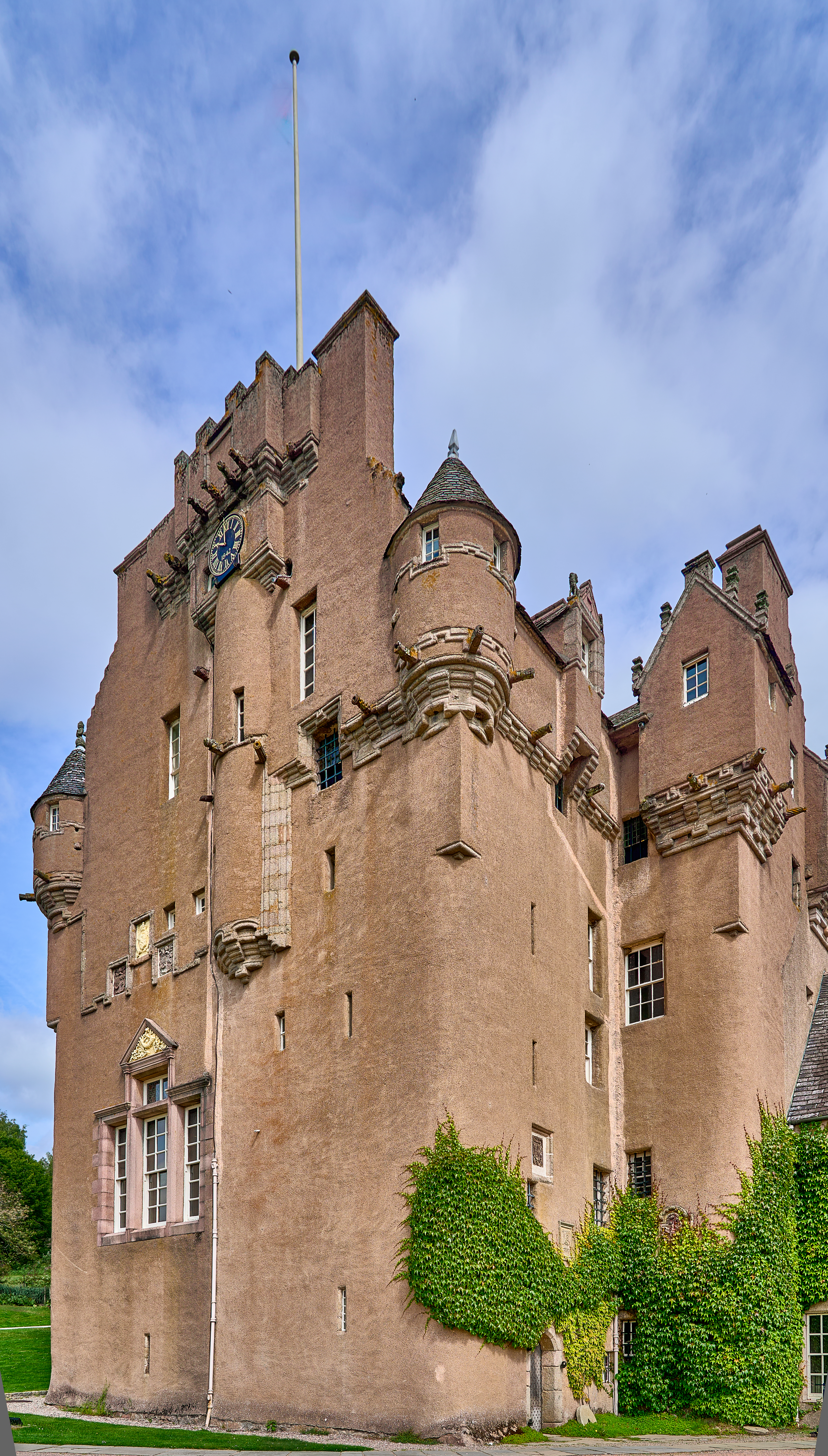
The castle in 2025

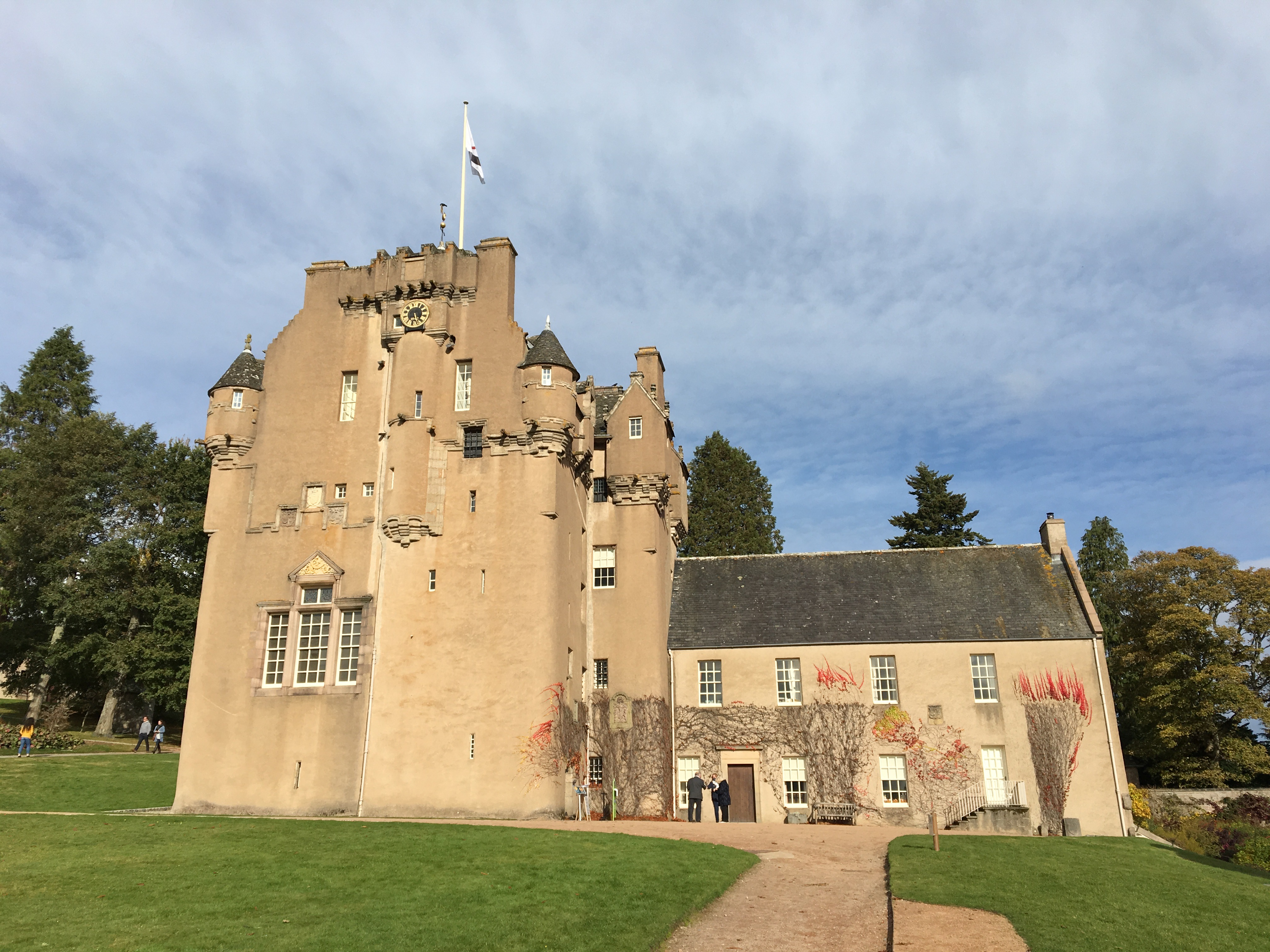
The castle in 2020

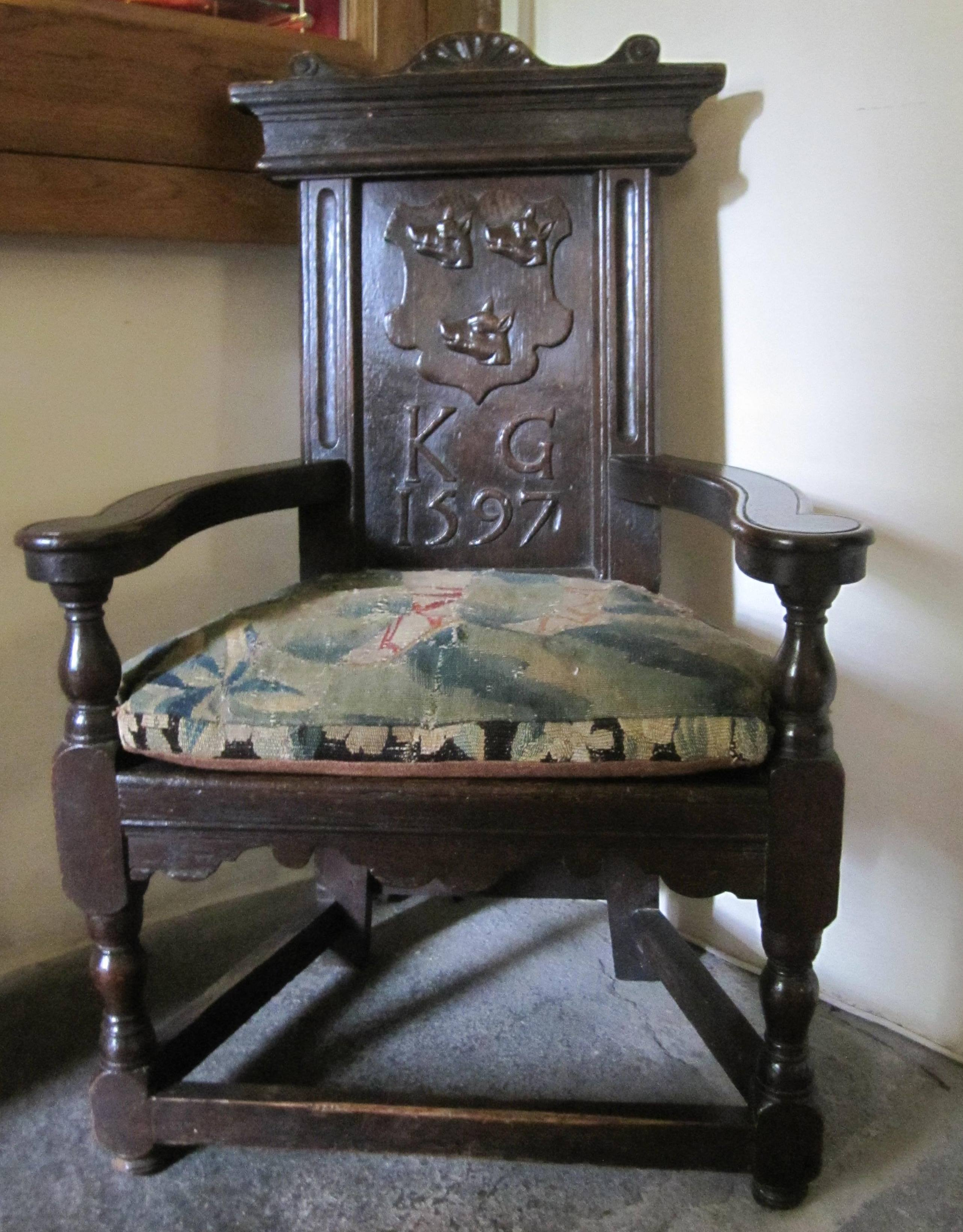
Caquetoire chair at Crathes made for Katherine Gordon, 1597

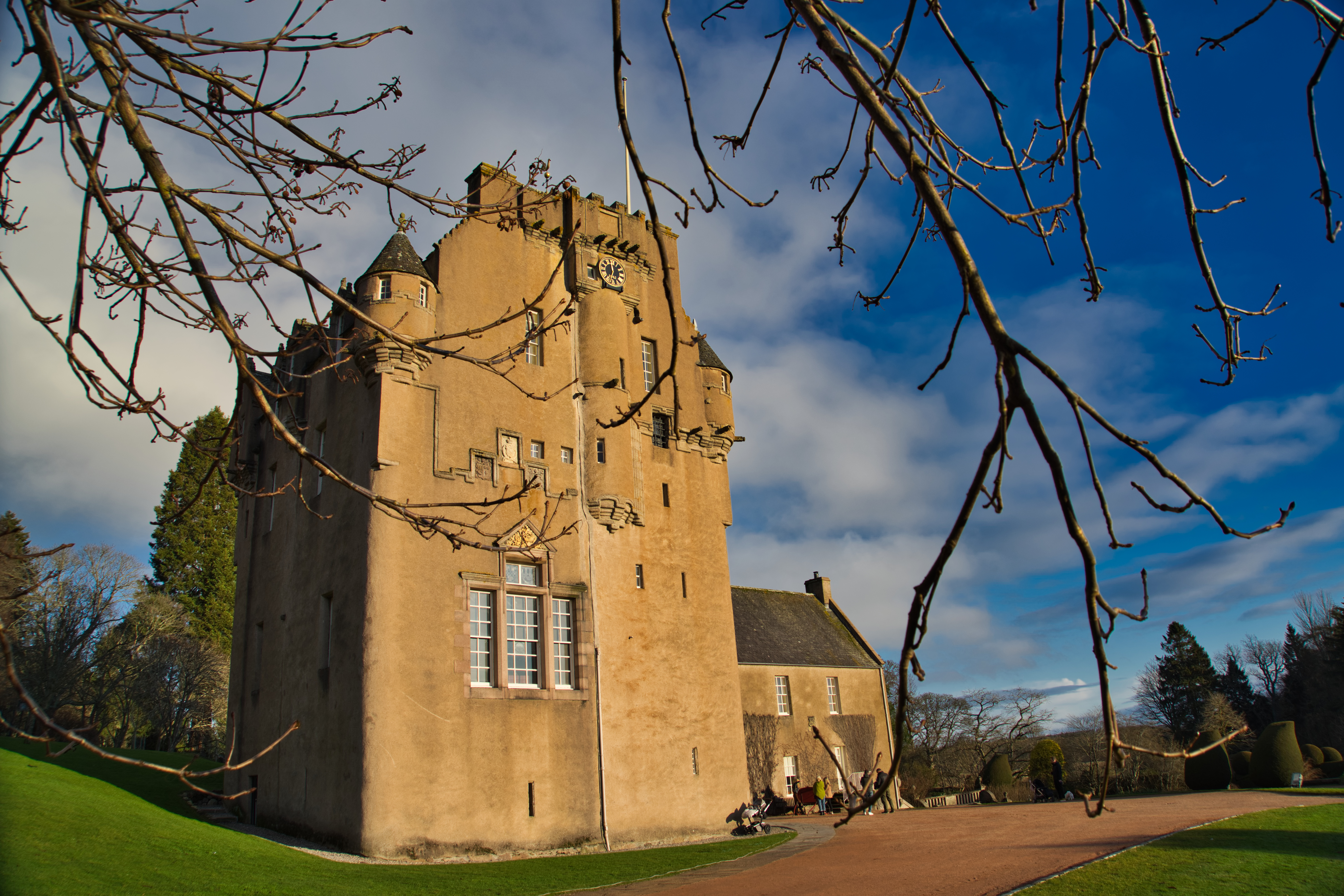
The castle in 2019

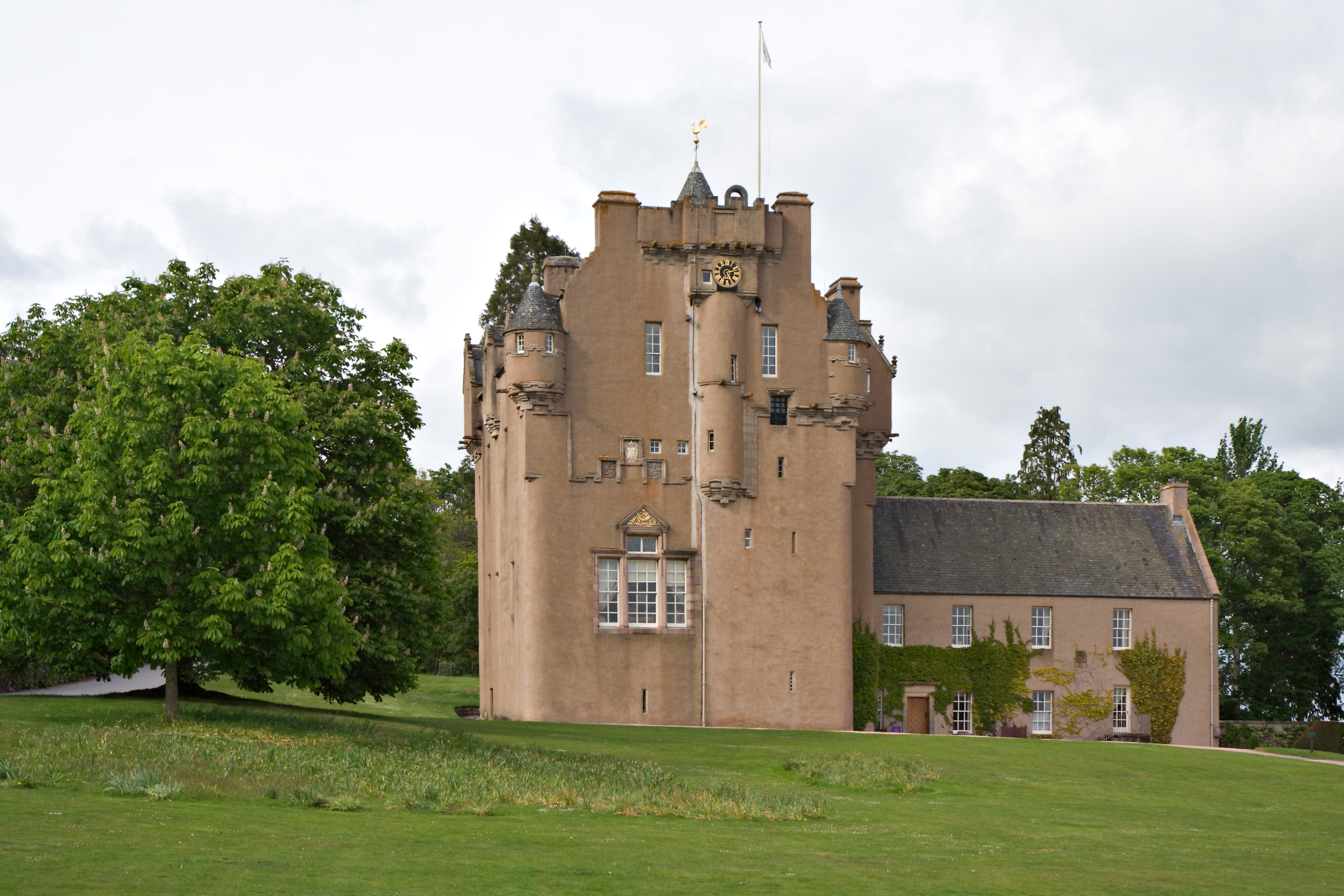
The castle in 2007

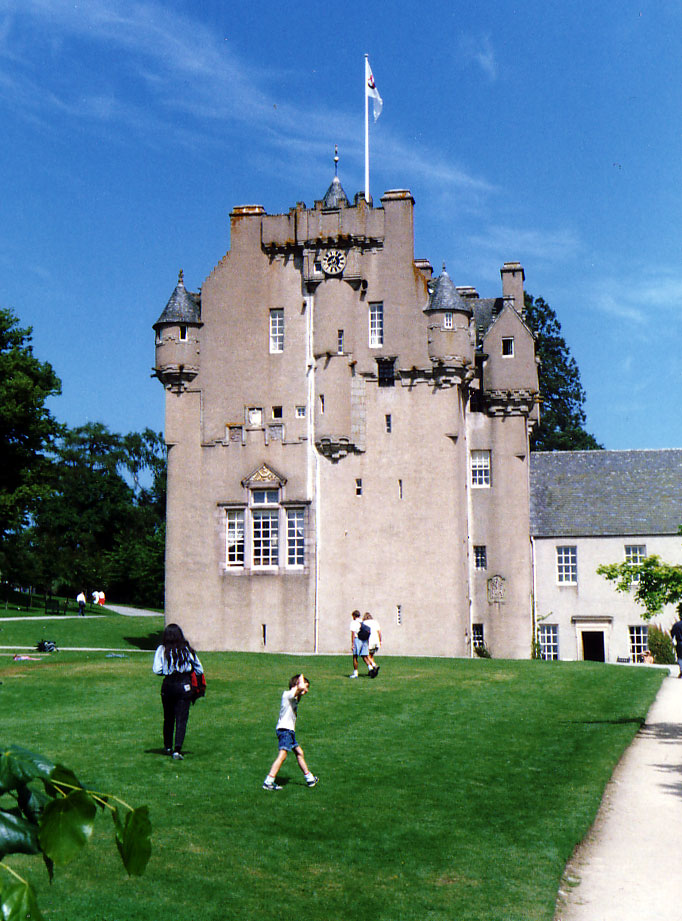
The castle in 1991

== See also ==
- Balbridie

== Bibliography ==
- Gow, Ian (2008). Scotland's Lost Houses. National Trust for Scotland. Aurum. ISBN 978-1-84513-393-1.
