= Caquetoire =

French armchair style

The caquetoire, or conversation chair, was an armchair style which emerged during the European Renaissance in France.

The name caquetoire is derived from caqueter, a French term meaning to chat. The chair was thus named the caquetoire as a reference to women sitting and talking. The term may have been early applied to various forms of seat or bench. In 1556 Henri Estienne wrote that Parisian women called their seats at the bedside of a new mother "caquetoires". Older dictionaries relate the 'caquetoire' to relaxed social situations, "où on caquette à son aise", - a fireside seat where one may chat at ease. There are 16th-century references to tapestry covered benches serving as caquetoires. The term now denotes a particular form of chair.

A recognised feature of a caquetoire chair is a splayed seat and outward curving arms so women wearing their large skirts or farthingales could sit comfortably. Due to fashions of the time and the lack of heating systems in homes, women wore several layers of skirts and petticoats to keep warm. This often prevented them from fitting comfortably into armchairs with rectangular seats.

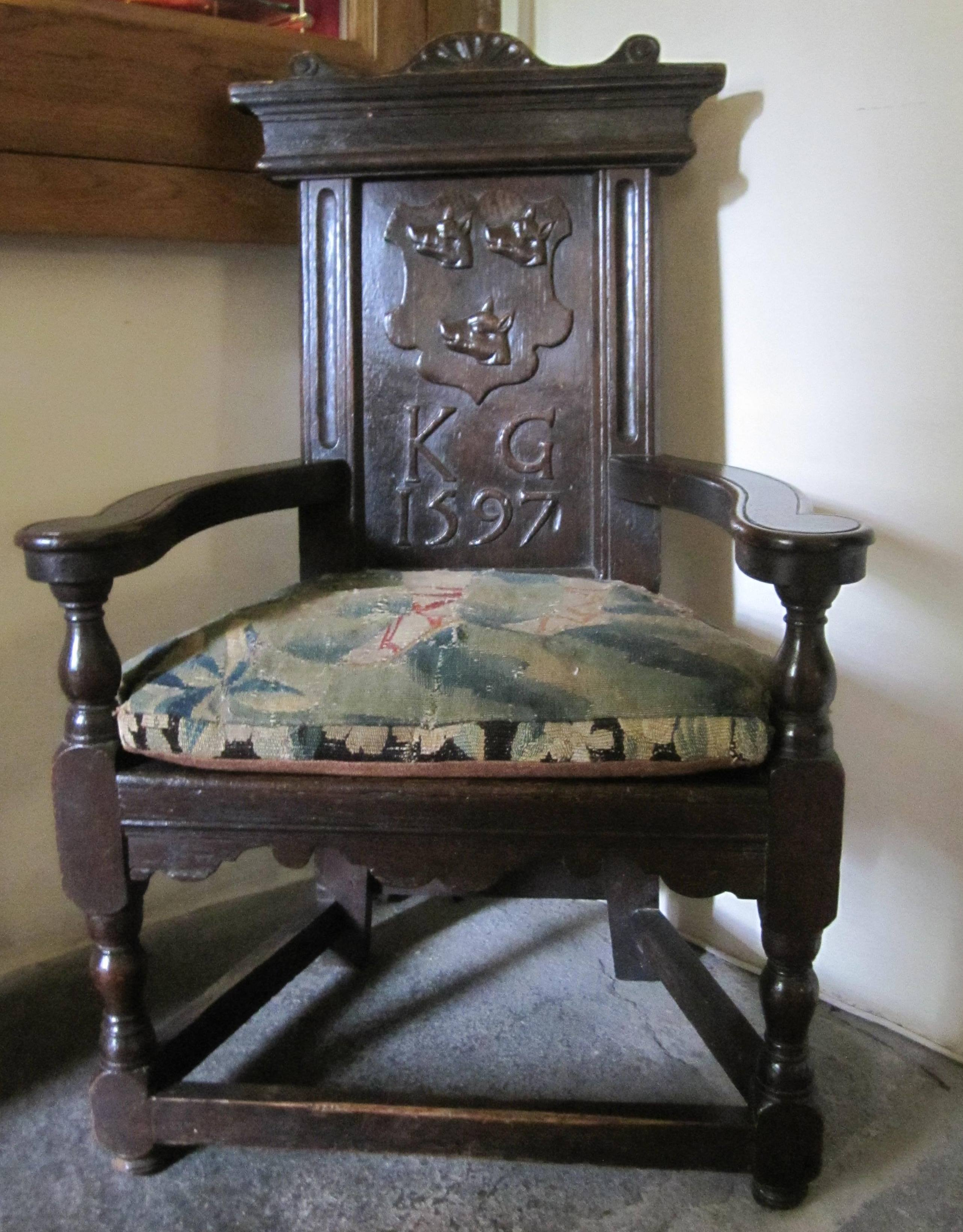
Chair made for Katherine Gordon, 1597, at Crathes Castle, Scotland.

The French chairs were often made from walnut rather than oak allowing the frames to be more elaborately carved. They were built with mortise and tenon joinery, so no nails were exposed and no glue had to be used. The supports were baluster-turned and terminated in bun feet.

The form of an arm chair with a splayed trapezoidal seat became popular in Scotland and several oak examples from the 16th and 17th centuries survive. Some were made for aristocratic women and carved with their initials and heraldry, while others of similar form were made for men. Later writers on furniture history called the Scottish chair a "caqueteuse", a French word for a gossiping woman. There seems to have been no precise contemporary Scottish term for the chairs.
