= Lockhart baronets of Lee (1806) =

The Lockhart baronetcy, of Lee in the County of Lanark, was created in the Baronetage of the United Kingdom on 24 May 1806 for Alexander Lockhart, Member of Parliament for Berwick-upon-Tweed. He was a member of the extended Lockharts of Lee family. The title became extinct on the death of the fifth baronet in 1919.

== Lockhart baronets, of Lee (1806) ==
- Sir Alexander Macdonald Lockhart, 1st Baronet (died 1816)
- Sir Charles Macdonald Lockhart, 2nd Baronet (1799–1832)
- Sir Norman Macdonald Lockhart, 3rd Baronet (1802–1849)
- Sir Norman Macdonald Lockhart, 4th Baronet (1845–1870)
- Sir Simon Macdonald Lockhart, 5th Baronet (1849–1919)

=== Coat of arms ===
Coat of arms of Lockhart baronets of Lee
Crest A boar's head erased Argent. Escutcheon Quarterly, I and IV, Argent a man's heart Gules within a fetterlock Sable, on a chief Azure three boar's heads erased of the first (Lockhart). II and III Quarterly, 1st, Or, a lion rampant Gules 2nd, Or, a naked ann issuing from the sinister side in fesse Proper holding a cross-crosslet fitchée in pale Gules 3rd, Argent a galley her oars in saltire Sable ensigned Gules 4th, Vert, a salmon in fesse Argent (Macdonald). Supporters Dexter: A chevalier armed cap-a-pie a chain gold about his neck thereat pendent a man's heart Gules ensigned with an imperial crown Or, and on his helmet a plume of feathers the centre Gules the other Argent. Sinister: A buck Proper. Motto Corda serrata pando (Lockhart); Semper pugnare paratus pro patria (Macdonald)

== Notes ==
Baronetage of the United Kingdom
Preceded by Ramsay baronets	Lockhart baronets of Lee; 24 May 1806	Succeeded by Fraser baronets
