= Sir James Burnett, 13th Baronet =

British Army officer

Major-General Sir James Burnett Bt CB CMG DSO*
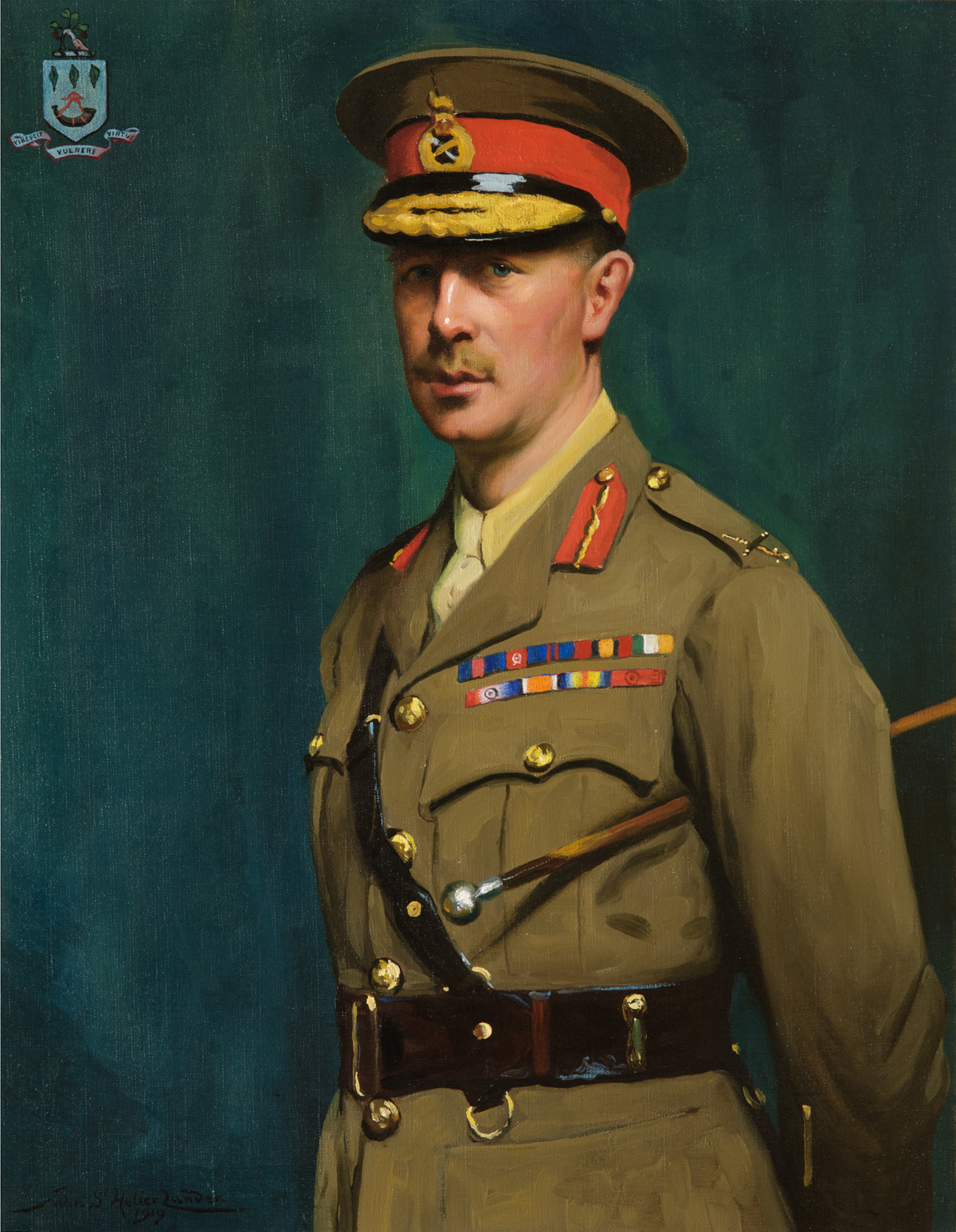
- Portrait by John St Helier Lander
- Born: 1 April 1880
- Died: 13 August 1953 (aged 73)
- Military career
- Allegiance: United Kingdom
- Branch: British Army
- Service years: 1899–1935
- Rank: Major-General
- Commands: 51st (Highland) Division; 8th Infantry Brigade; 153rd Infantry Brigade; 14th Infantry Brigade; 1st Battalion, Gordon Highlanders
- Conflicts: Second Boer War; First World War
- Awards: Companion of the Order of the Bath; Companion of the Order of St Michael and St George; Distinguished Service Order & Bar; Mentioned in Despatches; Officer of the Legion of Honour (France)

Major-General Sir James Lauderdale Gilbert Burnett, 13th Baronet, CB, CMG, DSO & Bar (1 April 1880 – 13 August 1953) was a British Army officer.

== Military career ==
Born the son of Colonel Sir Thomas Burnett, 12th Baronet, and Mary Elizabeth Cumine and educated at Wellington College, Burnett was commissioned into the Gordon Highlanders on 6 December 1899. He was appointed a Companion of the Distinguished Service Order in March 1915 and subsequently commanded the 1st Battalion, the Gordon Highlanders during the First World War. On 3 December 1917 he was placed in command of the 186th (2/2nd West Riding) Brigade and was granted the temporary rank of brigadier general while employed in this role.

After serving as commanding officer (CO) of a battalion of the Gordon Highlanders he was placed on half-pay. Promoted on 15 January 1927 to colonel, with seniority backdated to 3 June 1919, he went on to be commander of the 14th Infantry Brigade in January 1927, commander of the 153rd Infantry Brigade in January 1928 and commander of the 8th Infantry Brigade on 25 March 1930, being granted the temporary rank of brigadier while employed in this role. He was promoted to major general in May 1931 and his last appointment was as GOC 51st (Highland) Division in June, when he took command, before relinquishing the assignment, and being placed on half-pay in June 1935. He retired from the army in November 1935.

Burnett was colonel of the Gordon Highlanders from 1939 to 1948. He gave Crathes Castle, which had served as the ancestral seat of the Burnetts of Leys, to the National Trust for Scotland in 1951.

== Family ==
In 1913, Burnett married Sybil Crozier Smith; they had two sons and a daughter, Rohays, who was the mother of the racehorse trainer Sir Henry Cecil.

Military offices
Preceded by Sir William Thomson	GOC 51st (Highland) Division; 1931–1935	Succeeded by Douglas Brownrigg
Baronetage of Nova Scotia
Preceded by Thomas Burnett	Baronet (of Leys); 1926–1953	Succeeded by Alexander Burnett
