= Ramsay baronets of Whitehill (1665) =

Escutcheon of the Ramsay baronets of Whitehill

The Ramsay baronetcy, of Whitehill in the County of Edinburgh, was created in the Baronetage of Nova Scotia on 2 June 1665 for John Ramsay. The title became extinct on the death of the fifth Baronet in 1744.

== Ramsay baronets, of Whitehill (1665) ==
- Sir John Ramsay, 1st Baronet (1624–1674)
- Sir John Ramsay, 2nd Baronet (1645–1715)
- Sir John Ramsay, 3rd Baronet (died 1717)
- Sir Andrew Ramsay, 4th Baronet (1678–1721)
- Sir John Ramsay, 5th Baronet (1720–1744)
