= Alexander Burnett of Leys =

Scottish landowner

Alexander Burnett, 12th Laird of Leys (died 5 July 1619) was a Scottish landowner.

Burnett was the Laird of Crathes Castle in the late 16th and early 17th century, and is credited for the completion of Crathes in 1596. He acquired Muchalls Castle about 1600 and commenced its early 17th-century reconstruction.

He married Katherine Gordon of Lesmoir. Two caquetoire chairs and a bed at Crathes are carved with their initials and heraldry.

After his death in 1619, Muchalls Castle was completed by his son, Sir Thomas Burnett, 1st Baronet. Alexander Burnett's daughter, Helen, was married to John, Laird of Allardice, on 3 September 1617.
