= Lesmoir Castle =

Castle in Aberdeenshire, Scotland

Location
- Coordinates: 57.33964194°N 2.880595328°W

Site history
- Built: 14th century

Lesmoir Castle was a 16th-century castle, about 2.0 miles (3.2 km) west of Rhynie, Aberdeenshire, Scotland, south-west of Tap o' Noth, at Mains of Lesmoir.

== History ==
Jock o’Scurdargue used the castle in the 15th century. Although it has been suggested that there was construction dating back to 1508 while the earliest evidence suggests 1544. It is said to have been repaired around 1600. It became a Gordon stronghold in the 16th century. David Leslie captured it in 1647 by draining the wet moat; he sacked the castle and hanged 27 of the garrison. The Grants of Rothiemaise purchased it in 1759, and dismantled it.

Clan member crest badge - Clan Gordon

== Structure ==
The castle was in 13th-century circular earthworks. There are few remains of the castle. In 1647, there was a tower with a walled courtyard, which enclosed outbuildings. There was a moat. A house here remained until 1759 when it was demolished for building materials. There was a motte. The bailey which was to the south was a triangle about 5 feet (1.5 m) above the marshland.

== See also ==
- Castles in Great Britain and Ireland
- List of castles in Scotland
