= Sir Thomas Burnett, 1st Baronet =

Sir Thomas Burnett, 1st Baronet of Leys (died 27 June 1653) was a feudal baron and leading Covenanter who had represented Kincardineshire in the Scottish Parliament in 1621.

== Early years ==
The eldest surviving son of Alexander Burnett of Leys and Katherine, eldest daughter of Alexander Gordon of Lesmoir, "Thomas Burnaetus de Leyes" appears in the records of King's College, Aberdeen and Aberdeen University, as a student who matriculated in 1603. In 1604 and 1606 when he was a witness to sasines he is designed as his father's "son and heir apparent", whom he succeeded in 1619 in the feudal barony of Leys and a range of other lands and rights. He completed the work of restoring Muchalls Castle, which his father acquired in the year 1588.

In 1619, prior to his father's death, Thomas Burnet younger of Leys was one of a body of Commissioners named by King James VI of Scotland, at the instance of Bishop Patrick Forbes, to visit the universities of Aberdeen. The same year he was made an honorary Burgess of Aberdeen, and in 1620 he was knighted. He was one of the earliest recipients of the dignity of Baronet of Nova Scotia, his patent dated at Holyroodhouse on 21 April 1626.

In the Act of 1621 for the Plantation of new kirks, mention is made of Burnet of Leys having petitioned for the erection of a new church at Fetteresso, the parish in which his lands and castle of Muchalls lay, the castle being begun by his father was completed by Sir Thomas in 1627. The religious strife of the 1620s found Sir Thomas a decided opponent of the Episcopalian Court party and he became a supporter of the Solemn League and Covenant.

== Covenanting wars ==
Immediately on the subscription of the Covenant in Edinburgh, the powerfully organized body, known as the Tables, made arrangements for enforcing its acceptance throughout the whole country and gathering funds to support military detachments.

Sir Thomas Burnett of Lees was one of their commissioners for the district north of the Grampians. He and other Commissioners paid a preliminary visit to Aberdeen in early July 1638 where they were told politely but firmly by the town's magistrates and other leading citizens that they had no legal authority to exact the subscriptions demanded. The deputation returned in force on the 20th of that month headed by the Earl of Montrose, then an earnest Covenanter, with several notable Covenanting preachers with them. The latter were promptly refused the pulpits of the city churches. The university promptly denounced the Covenant as unlawful, and three of the leading preachers, Henderson, Dickson, and Cant, made a temporary retreat to the safety of Sir Thomas's Muchalls Castle.

In March 1639, some 11000 men under Montrose and Huntly were told to 'reduce' the northern districts to subjection, but on 12 March 1639, Montrose and Argyll wrote to Sir Thomas Burnett of Leys to reassure him. Aberdeen made strong representations to Montrose who retired to Strathbogie whilst his army were admitted into the town for accommodation, most of the opposition to them having fled. Sir Thomas Burnett was one of the tribunal established to sit on 2 April in Greyfriars Church there and on following days, to force 'malignants' to subscribe to the Covenant under pain of confiscation of their goods. Viscount Aboyne's part of the Covenanting army then encamped at Muchalls and ransacked Burnett's property, despite his protestations.

Further Covenanters arrived at Aberdeen in 1644 under the Earl of Argyll and the Earl Marischal, and during that occupation a Committee of the Estates for Northern Business met there, to which a petition was presented by Lord Fraser, Sir Thomas Burnett of Leys, Patrick Leslie the Provost, and others, complaining of their losses by the quartering of troops and seeking redress from the first and readiest effects of the 'malignants' which come to hand.

Later that year, Montrose, raised to a Marquess and now opposed to the Covenant, marched north to suppress opposition to the King's cause. Leys clearly thought the Covenanters had gone too far in open rebellion against their King, and summoned Montrose to his castle at Crathes to sup with him, whereupon he offered Montrose arms, horses, and 5000 merks. Montrose accepted the arms and horses but refused the money. Sir Thomas and his son were subsequently the only known Covenanters who were protected by the Marquess. In the meantime Sir Thomas armed and organised half of his retainers to protect his lands from robber bands now all too plentiful due to the state of the north. At the same time Sir Thomas petitioned the Scottish Parliament for an exemption from excise and other heavy taxation being raised for Covenanting armies being sent to England, and for aid against marauding Highlanders.

It would appear that Sir Thomas was refused exemption for he subsequently sent his whole silver plate to Edinburgh to be melted down, by way of a loan, and also loaned money to the Marquess of Argyll.

== Charles II ==
Following the Proclamation of Charles II as King in Scotland, the Scottish Parliament adopted the most uncompromisingly covenanting character and its records for 1649 contain a complaint from Sir Thomas Burnett of Leys to the effect that he was owed £67,000 for supporting their cause. The result was an act of Parliament in favour of Sir Thomas exempting him from further levies and recommending he be repaid, although it is unclear he ever was.

Charles II summoned Sir Thomas to support him in a letter dictated to the Earl Marischal dated 5 October 1650. The King wrote again to Sir Thomas on 12 April 1651, granting him an exemption from the quartering of soldiers. There followed Charles's defeat at the battle of Worcester after which there were widespread persecutions. However, Sir Thomas Burnett appears to have again trod a diplomatic course as General Monck wrote to him from Dundee on 26 December 1651, assuring him of protection.

== Educational matters ==
Sir Thomas Burnett had co-operated with Bishop Patrick Forbes in removing 'abuses' in King's College, Aberdeen, and amending its discipline, although there is no trace of his having had a hand in its "purgation" in 1640. His continued love of his Alma Mater, notwithstanding its prelatic leanings, is shown by his endowment, in October 1648, of three Bursaries of Philosophy in King's College. The Parliamentary records of 1649 record Sir Thomas again as one of a proposed Commission to visit Aberdeen University.

Another education foundation by Sir Thomas Burnett was an endowment by a bond of 5,000 merks to the Grammar School of Banchory-Ternan on 29 October 1651.

At a later period he built a hospital at Banchory for the support of the aged dwelling on his estates and, in October 1651, he mortified 6300 merks secured on his lands in the parish of Crimond for the inmates of that hospital.

== Marriage ==
Sir Thomas was twice married with issue from both. He married (1) Margaret (d. before August 1621), eldest daughter of Sir Robert Douglas of Glenbervie, second son of William Douglas, 9th Earl of Angus. They had two sons and two daughters,

He remarried by contract dated 9 August 1621 (2) Jean, daughter of Sir John Moncrieff of that Ilk, and widow of Sir Simon Fraser of Inverallochy. They had three sons and four daughters.

A portrait of Sir Thomas by the Scottish painter George Jameson remains in Crathes Castle.

Baronetage of Nova Scotia
New creation	Baronet (of Leys); 1626–1653	Succeeded by Alexander Burnett
