= Burnett baronets =

Baronetcy in the Baronetage of the United Kingdom

Sir Thomas Burnett, 1st Baronet

There have been two baronetcies created for persons with the surname Burnett, one in the Baronetage of Nova Scotia and one in the Baronetage of the United Kingdom. As of 2010 one creation is extant while one is dormant.

The Burnett Baronetcy, of Leys in the County of Kincardine, was created in the Baronetage of Nova Scotia on 21 April 1626 for the leading Covenanter Thomas Burnett. He was the uncle of Gilbert Burnet, Bishop of Salisbury. The third Baronet was one of the Scottish representatives to the 1st Parliament of Great Britain. The eighth, tenth and twelfth Baronets all served as Lord Lieutenant of Kincardineshire. The thirteenth Baronet was a major general in the British Army. The title became dormant on the death of the fourteenth Baronet in 1959.

The sixth Baronet married Catherine, sister and heiress of Sir Alexander Ramsay-Irvine, 6th and last Baronet, of Balmain (see Ramsay Baronets). Their second son Alexander Burnett succeeded to the Ramsay estates on his uncle's death in 1806 and assumed the surname of Ramsay in lieu of his patronymic. The same year the baronetcy of Balmain was revived in his favour. His descendant Sir Alexander William Burnett Ramsay, 7th Baronet, is presumed to be the heir to the Burnett Baronetcy of Leys.

The Burnett Baronetcy, of Selborne House in the County Borough of Croydon, was created in the Baronetage of the United Kingdom on 17 October 1913 for Sir David Burnett, Lord Mayor of London between 1912 and 1913. As of 2010 the title is held by his great-grandson, the fourth Baronet, who succeeded his father in 2002.

== Burnett baronets, of Leys (1626) ==
Escutcheon of the Burnett baronets of Leys

- Sir Thomas Burnett, 1st Baronet (died 1653)
- Sir Alexander Burnett, 2nd Baronet (died 1663)
- Sir Thomas Burnett, 3rd Baronet (died 1714)
- Sir Alexander Burnett, 4th Baronet (died 1758)
- Sir Robert Burnett, 5th Baronet (died 1759)
- Sir Thomas Burnett, 6th Baronet (died 1783)
- Sir Robert Burnett, 7th Baronet (1755–1837)
- Sir Thomas Burnett, 8th Baronet (1778–1849)
- Sir Alexander Burnett, 9th Baronet (1789–1856)
- Sir James Horn Burnett, 10th Baronet (1801–1876)
- Sir Robert Burnett, 11th Baronet (1833–1894)
- Sir Thomas Burnett, 12th Baronet (1840–1926)
- Sir James Lauderdale Gilbert Burnett, 13th Baronet (1880–1953)
- Sir Alexander Edwin Burnett, 14th Baronet (1881–1959) died unmarried.

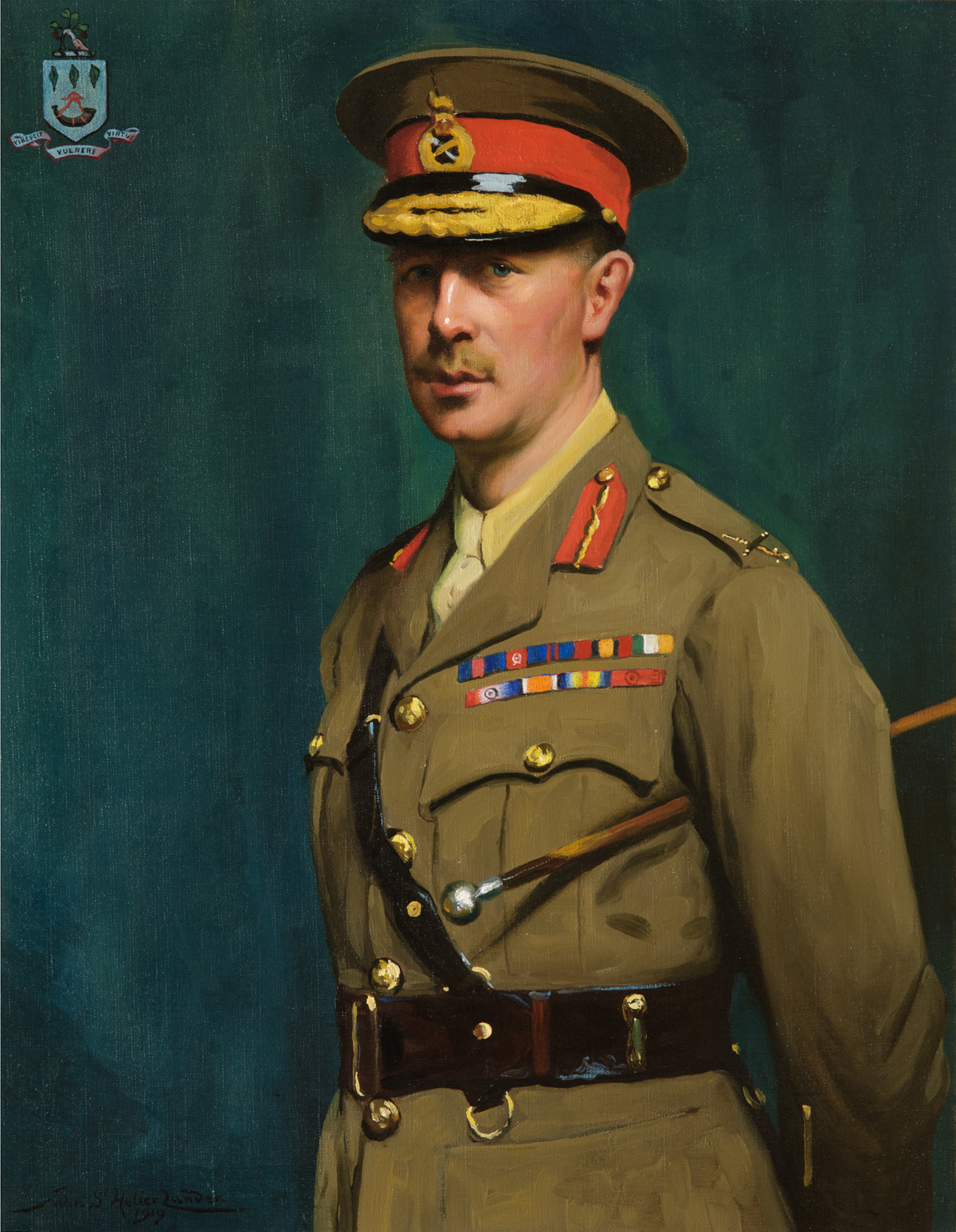
A 1919 portrait of the 13th baronet, Major General Sir James Lauderdale Gilbert Burnett, by John St Helier Lander

- The 13th Baronet's two sons, Alexander and Roger, both died as young men, so the estate passed through his daughter Elizabeth to her son James Cecil, who was obliged to change his surname to Burnett in order to succeed to the estate. However, the title of Baronet passes only through the male line, as long as a male line exists, so the heir to the Baronetcy of Burnett of Leys is Alexander William Burnett Ramsay, 7th Baronet, of Balmain (Ramsay Baronets), whose family line succeeded to the Ramsay estates and changed of surname by royal licence. Alexander William Burnett Ramsay lives in Australia.

== Burnett baronets, of Selborne House (1913) ==
Escutcheon of the Burnett baronets of Selborne House

- Sir David Burnett, 1st Baronet (1851–1930)
- Sir Leslie Trew Burnett, 2nd Baronet (1884–1955)
- Sir David Humphrey Burnett, 3rd Baronet (1918–2002)
- Sir Charles David Burnett, 4th Baronet (born 1951)

The heir presumptive is the present holder's brother John Godfrey Burnett (born 1954).

== See also ==
- Ramsay baronets
- Clan Burnett
