= List of Phi Kappa Psi members =

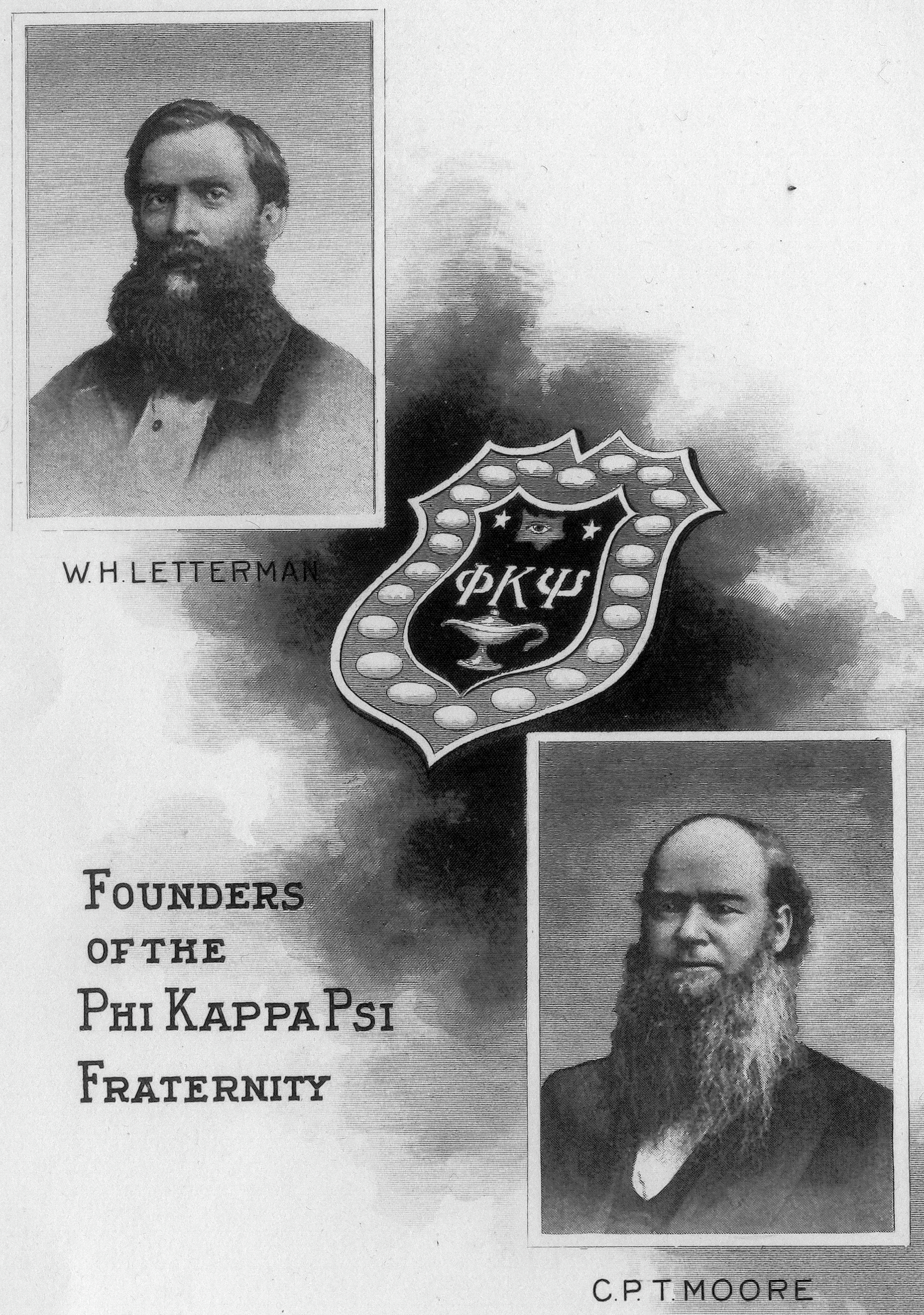
Phi Kappa Psi founders William Henry Letterman and Charles Page Thomas Moore

Phi Kappa Psi (ΦΚΨ), also called "Phi Psi", is an American collegiate social fraternity founded at Jefferson College in Canonsburg, Pennsylvania on February 19, 1852. There are over a hundred chapters and colonies at accredited four year colleges and universities throughout the United States.

More than 112,000 men have been initiated into Phi Kappa Psi since its founding, and many have achieved recognition in their field. Phi Psis in public service include U.S. President and Nobel Peace Prize recipient Woodrow Wilson, over a hundred members of Congress (including 18 senators and Speaker of the House Warren Keifer), three-term New York City Mayor and Bloomberg L.P. founder Mike Bloomberg, over a dozen state governors, two directors of the Peace Corps, and "Wild Bill" Donovan, the founding director of the Office of Strategic Services (the Central Intelligence Agency's predecessor) and recipient of the Medal of Honor and of the Freedom Award. Academian Phi Psis include over a dozen university presidents (among these are Priestley Medal recipient Edgar Fahs Smith, and Presidential Medal of Freedom recipient Detlev Bronk), Rhodes scholars, and Pulitzer Prize-winning historian Frederick Jackson Turner. Amidst the Phi Psis who have served in the military are dozens of generals and admirals, including "Father of the U.S. Air Force" Billy Mitchell, World War I Army Chief of Staff Tasker Bliss, National Security Agency director Kenneth Minihan, and three Judge Advocate Generals. In the arts, Phi Psis have received Academy Awards, Emmys, Golden Globes, Grammys, and Tony Awards. Journalist Sy Hersh has won the Pulitzer Prize, Orwell Award and George Polk Award. Phi Psi businessmen include Bank of America founder Orra E. Monnette, Dow Chemical founder Herbert Dow, PIMCO founder Bill Gross, and Yahoo! founder Jerry Yang. Three Phi Psis have served as presidents of the American Bar Association. Sportsmen include Heisman Trophy winner Nile Kinnick, Olympic gold medalists including 7-time gold swimmer Mark Spitz, "Father of College Basketball Coaching" Phog Allen, NFL visionary Tex Schramm, and Commissioner of Baseball Ford Frick.

An active member of the fraternity is a full-time enrolled student at his chapter's host institution at the undergraduate, graduate, or post-graduate level; all others, including members who have graduated or transfer to a school without a Phi Psi chapter, are considered alumni. Men may be initiated into Phi Kappa Psi either by an active chapter, or as part of a colony that is being installed as a chapter. Members typically join Phi Kappa Psi when a chapter extends an offer to enter into a probationary period known as pledgeship, which lasts for six weeks and concludes with initiation.

Membership is normally only granted to men who are enrolled as full-time students at a chapter's host institution. There have been three exceptions to this:

1. Alumni of a colony which became a chapter after their graduation, and for two years after.
2. Men who have been of service to a chapter, but not students at the institution.
3. Honorary membership extended to men of prominence, a practice that was banned in 1885.

== Academia ==
Name	Original chapter	Initiation year	Notability	Ref.
Henry H. Apple	Pennsylvania Eta	1885	President of Franklin & Marshall College (1910–1935)	
William E. Boggs	South Carolina Alpha	1857	President of the University of Georgia (1889–1898)	
George F. Bovard	Indiana Alpha	1877	President of the University of Southern California (1903–1921)	
Detlev Bronk	Pennsylvania Kappa	1915	Presidential Medal of Freedom recipient (1964); a founder (1960) and past President of the World Academy of Art and Science; President of Rockefeller University (1953–1968); President of the National Academy of Sciences (1950–1962); President of Johns Hopkins University (1949–1953); credited with formulating the modern theory of the science of biophysics; allegedly a member of the Majestic 12	
Luther P. Eisenhart	Pennsylvania Epsilon	1893	Dod Professor of Mathematics at Princeton University (1929–1945)	
Frank Fetter	Indiana Beta	1879	Prominent economist of the Austrian School; President of the American Economic Association (1913)	
Herbert S. Hadley	Kansas Alpha	1888	Chancellor of Washington University (1923–1927); Governor of Missouri (1909–1913)	
Thomas H. Hamilton	Indiana Alpha	1933	President of the University of Hawaii (1963–1967); President of the State University of New York (1959–1962)	
David C. Hardesty Jr.	West Virginia Alpha	1964	President of West Virginia University (1995–2007); Rhodes Scholar (1967)	
Charles Homer Haskins	Pennsylvania Beta	1883	One of three advisors to President Wilson at the Paris Peace Conference, 1919, medieval historian at Harvard University (1912–1931)	
Edmund J. James	Illinois Alpha	1879	President of the University of Illinois (1904–1920); founder and President of the American Academy of Political and Social Science (1889–1895)	
Timothy R. Lannon	Nebraska Beta	1970	President of Creighton University (2011–2015); President of Saint Joseph's University (2003–2011)	
Leverett S. Lyon	Wisconsin Gamma	1906	Economist, lawyer, and business executive; CEO of the Chicago Association of Commerce and Industry (1939–1954); Executive vice-president of the Brookings Institution (1932–1939); Dean of Washington University's School of Commerce and Finance (1923–1925); 25th President of Phi Kappa Psi (1936–1938)	
John McBryde	South Carolina Alpha	1859	President of Virginia Tech (1891–1907); President of the University of South Carolina (1883–1891)	
Ernest Merritt	New York Alpha	1885	Physicist; chair of Cornell's Physics department (1919–1935); president of the American Physical Society (1914–1916); first dean of Cornell's Graduate School (1909–1914); co-founder of Physical Review (1893)	
Paul M. O'Leary	Kansas Alpha	1919	Economist; first dean of the Samuel Curtis Johnson Graduate School of Management; member of Franklin D. Roosevelt's Brain Trust	
John W. Oswald	Indiana Alpha	1935	President of Pennsylvania State University (1970–1983); Executive Vice President of the University of California (1968–1970); President of the University of Kentucky (1963–1968)	
Boyd C. Patterson	Pennsylvania Alpha	1921	President of Washington & Jefferson College (1950–1970)	
Edwin W. Pauley	California Gamma	1920	University of California Regent (1940–1972); Democratic National Committee Treasurer (1930s–1940s); namesake of the Pauley Pavilion (sports arena at UCLA)	
John P. Schlegel	Nebraska Beta	1979	President of Creighton University (2000–2011); President of the University of San Francisco (1991–2000)	
Edgar Fahs Smith	Pennsylvania Epsilon	1873	Priestley Medal recipient (1926); Provost of the University of Pennsylvania (1911–1920); President of the American Philosophical Society (1902–1908); President of the American Chemical Society (1895, 1921); first editor of The Shield of Phi Kappa Psi; founder of Phi Psi's University of Pennsylvania chapter (1877)	
James R. Thornton	Virginia Gamma	1867	President of Hampden–Sydney College (1904)	
Rees Edgar Tulloss	Ohio Beta	1901	President of Wittenberg University (1920–1949)	
Andrew Truxal	Pennsylvania Eta	1916	President of Anne Arundel Community College (1961–1968); President of Hood College (1948–1961); 27th President of Phi Kappa Psi (1940–1942)	
Frederick Jackson Turner	Wisconsin Alpha	1878	Winner of the Pulitzer Prize for History for The Significance of Sections in American History (1933); professor of history at the University of Wisconsin (1890–1910) and Harvard University (1911–1924); President of the American Historical Association (1910); authored The Significance of the Frontier in American History (1893)	

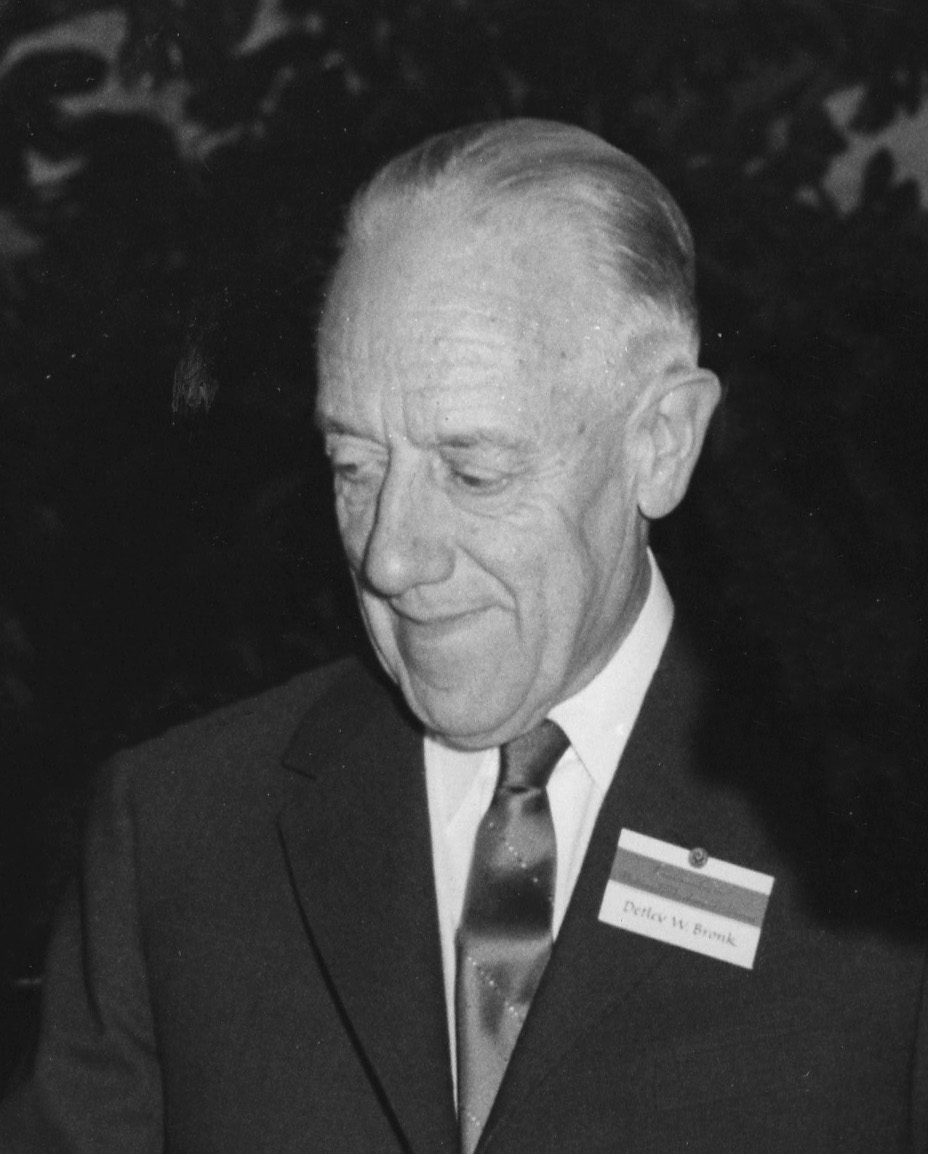
Detlev Bronk

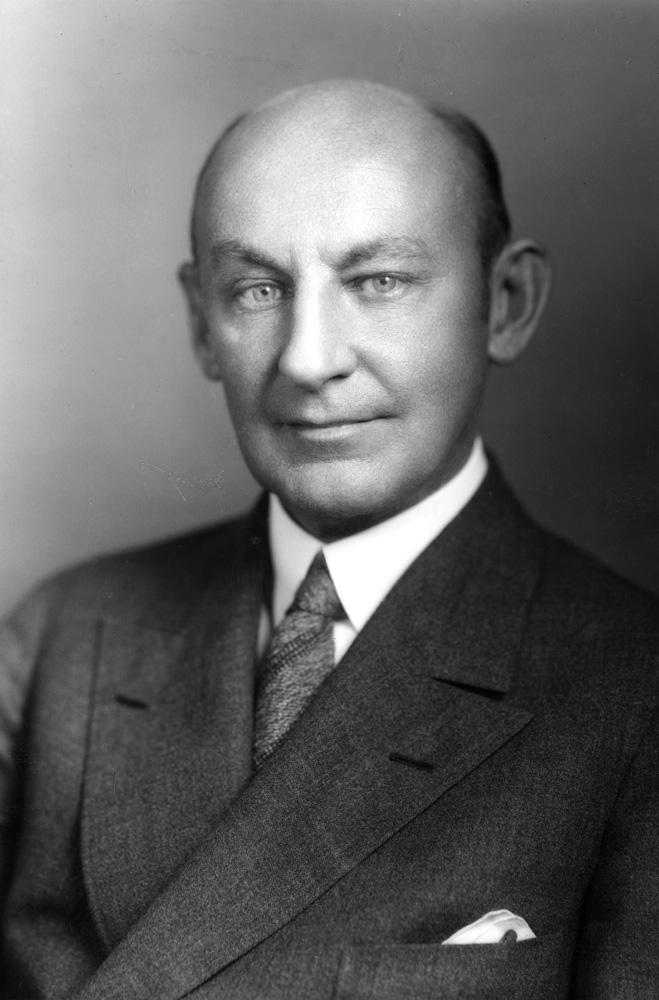
Leverett S. Lyon

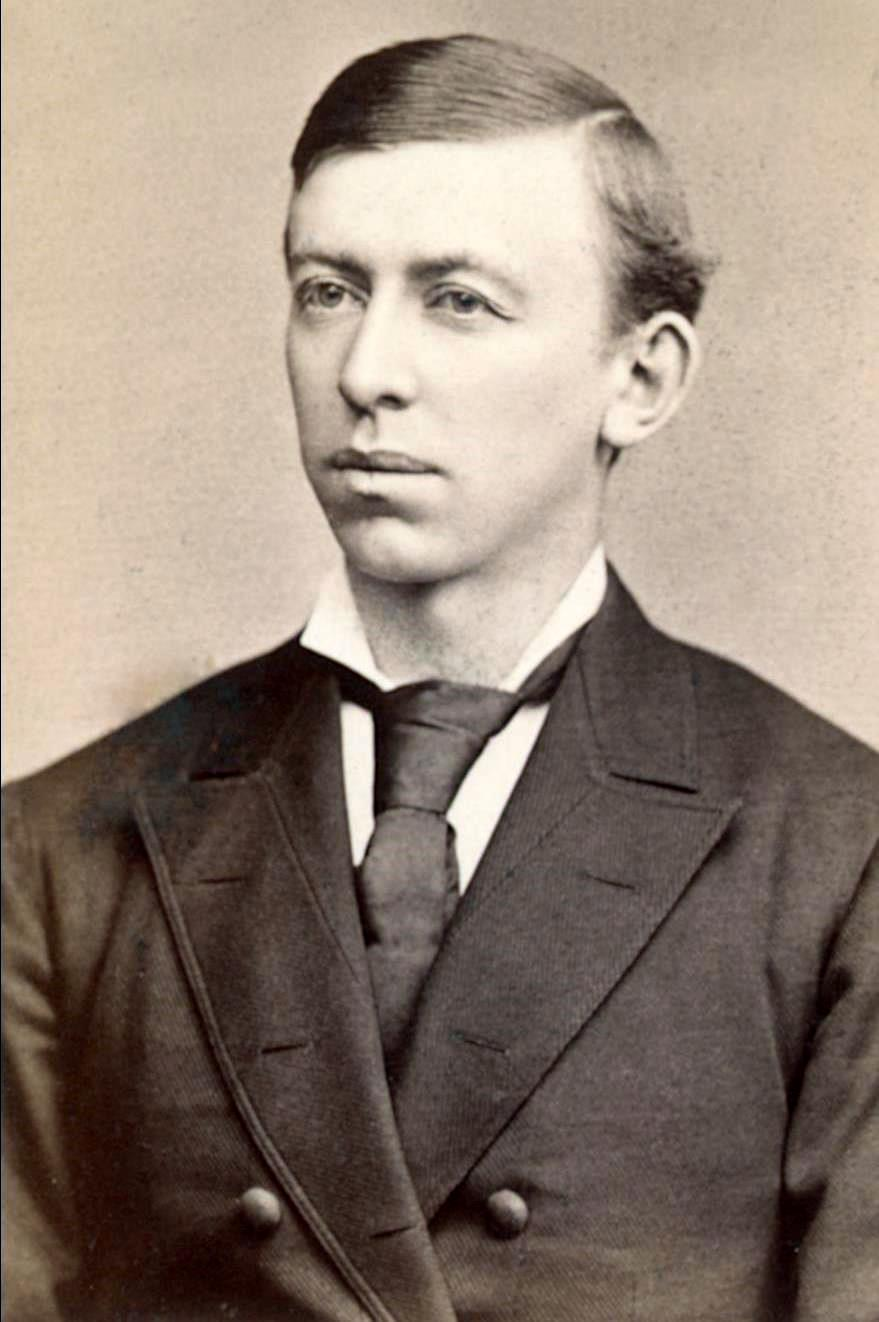
Edgar Fahs Smith

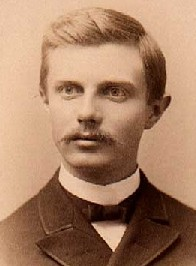
Frederick Jackson Turner

== Arts, entertainment, and journalism ==
=== Drama ===
Name	Original chapter	Initiation year	Notability	Ref.
John Astin	Maryland Alpha	1949	Actor famous for his role as Gomez Addams in The Addams Family television series; received an Academy Award nomination for Prelude, a short film that he wrote, produced, and directed	
Kirk Baily	Ohio Lambda	1982	Actor famous for playing Kevin 'Ug' Lee on the Nickelodeon sitcom Salute Your Shorts. Later known for voice acting roles as Tetsuya Kajiwara in Fushigi Yûgi, Millions Knives in Trigun, and Shin in Cowboy Bebop	
Zach Braff	Illinois Alpha	1994	Actor, director, screenwriter, producer; played Dr. John Dorian on the television series Scrubs; won a Grammy Award for the Garden State soundtrack	
Anthony De Longis	California Theta	1968	Actor in Masters of the Universe (film) & Road House (1989 film) as well as TV shows Star Trek: Voyager & Highlander: The Series. Well-known stunt choreographer.	
Ato Essandoh	New York Alpha	1992	Actor and playwright, co-founder of The Defiant Ones writing and performance group	
Peter Graves	Minnesota Beta	1946	Actor; won a Golden Globe Award for portraying James Phelps on the Mission: Impossible television series, and an Emmy Award for hosting Biography	
Walter Hampden	New York Zeta	1897	Actor and theater manager	
Edward Herrmann	Pennsylvania Gamma	1962	Actor who earned an Emmy award for guest appearances on The Practice, and a Tony Award for Best Featured Actor in a Play for his portrayal of Frank Gardner in Mrs. Warren's Profession, Fulbright scholar	
Grant Heslov	California Delta	1982	Academy Award-nominated producer and screenwriter for Good Night, and Good Luck	
Edward Everett Horton	New York Zeta	1907	Stage, screen and television actor	
Buck Houghton	California Epsilon	1935	Produced the first three seasons of The Twilight Zone	
Robert Leeshock	New York Alpha	1981	Actor who portrayed Liam Kincaid in Earth: Final Conflict	
Alexander Ludwig	California Delta	2010	Actor; played the role of Cato in The Hunger Games	
Frank Morgan	New York Alpha	1908	Academy Award-nominated actor; best known for playing five separate characters, including the title character, in The Wizard of Oz (1939).	
Charles "Buddy" Rogers	Kansas Alpha	1923	Actor and bandleader; starred in Wings (1927), the first movie to win the Academy Award for Best Picture; married movie legend and "America's Sweetheart" Mary Pickford	
Roy Scheider	Pennsylvania Eta	1954	Academy Award-winning Actor who portrayed Martin Brody in Jaws, won the Oscar for Best Supporting Actor in The French Connection, and was nominated for an Academy Award for his portrayal of Joe Gideon in All That Jazz	
Justin Walker	Virginia Beta	1987	Actor, played the role of Christian in Clueless	

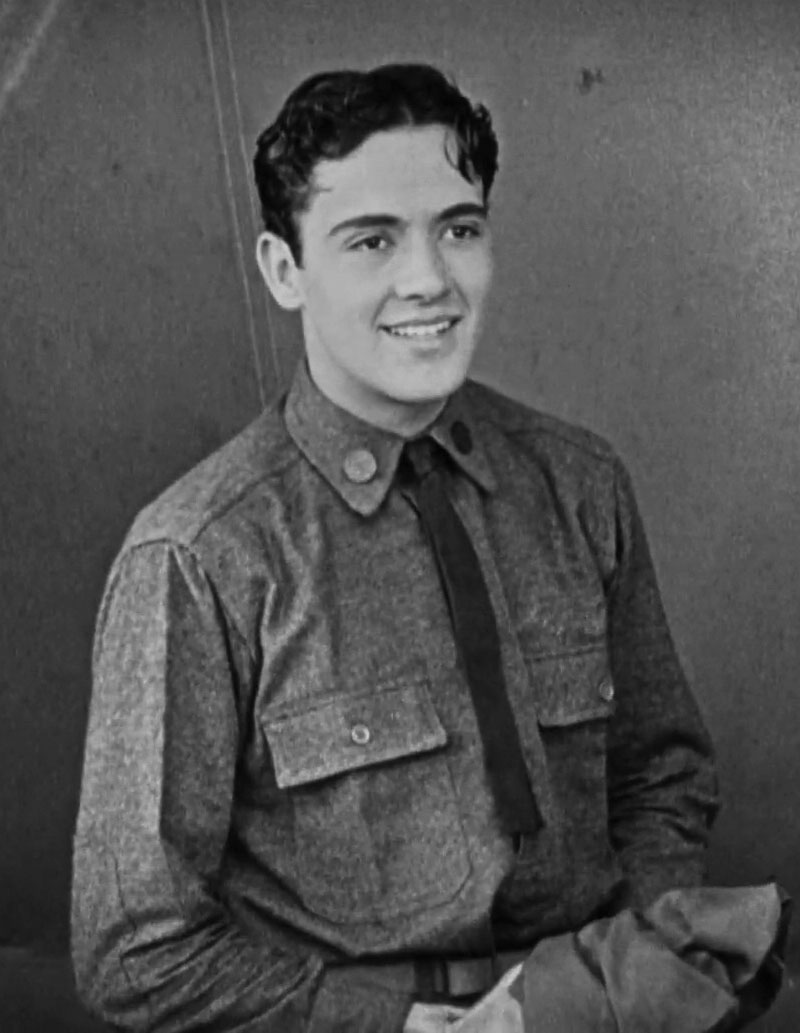
Charles "Buddy" Rogers

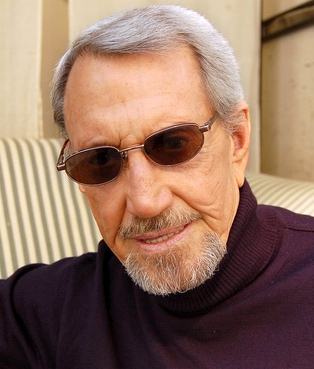
Roy Scheider

=== Journalism and media ===
Name	Original chapter	Initiation year	Notability	Ref.
Tony Aiello	Indiana Beta	1982	Broadcast journalist at WCBS-TV	
Thomas Scott Cadden	Kansas Alpha	1942	Television commercial advertising executive; wrote, produced and directed the original Mr. Clean television commercials and composed the "Mr. Clean" advertising jingle	
Sy Hersh	Illinois Beta	1956	Journalist and recipient of the Pulitzer Prize, Orwell Award and George Polk Award	
Harlan D. Logan	Indiana Beta	1923	Rhodes Scholar; New Hampshire State Representative (1969–1972, Majority Leader); directed Look Magazine (1939–1952); editor of Scribner's Magazine (1936–1939)	
John Andrew Rea	Ohio Alpha	1866	First Executive Director of the Port of Tacoma (1918–1921); University of Washington Board of Regents (1910–1922); editor-in-chief of The Olympian (1891–1892); drafted the constitution adopted by North Dakota when it became a state in 1889; correspondent for the Chicago Tribune and the New York Herald, covered the 1877 flight of Chief Joseph and the Nez Perce to Montana and their final battle with the US Army, as well the Battle of the Little Bighorn in 1876; founder of Phi Psi's New York Alpha chapter at Cornell University	
William Edwin Self	Illinois Beta	1940	Feature film and television producer	
Jeff Siegel	Pennsylvania Rho	1992	Financial writer and publisher	
Emmett Tyrrell	Indiana Beta	1962	Founder and editor-in-chief of The American Spectator, New York Times bestselling author, and columnist	
Pat Weaver	New Hampshire Alpha	1927	Pioneering television executive and Emmy Award winner; creator of "The Today Show" and "The Tonight Show;" father of actress Sigourney Weaver	

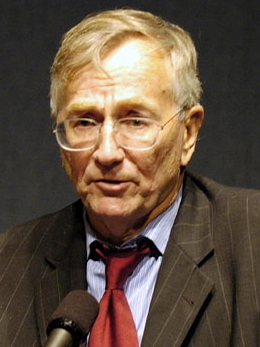
Sy Hersh

=== Literature ===
Name	Original chapter	Initiation year	Notability	Ref.
Robert Jones Burdette	Indiana Gamma	1878	Humorist who first wrote for The Hawk Eye, and then for The Brooklyn Daily Eagle	
James Whitcomb Riley	Indiana Alpha	1883	Poet and writer known as the "Hoosier Poet"	
Steve Tesich	Indiana Beta	1962	Screenwriter, playwright and novelist; won an Academy Award for Best Original Screenplay for Breaking Away	
James Thurber	Ohio Delta	1918	Tony Award-winning author and humorist, namesake of the Thurber Prize for American Humor	
Andrew Weinberg	New York Alpha	1995	Screenwriter who won an Emmy Award for his work with Late Night with Conan O'Brien in 2007	

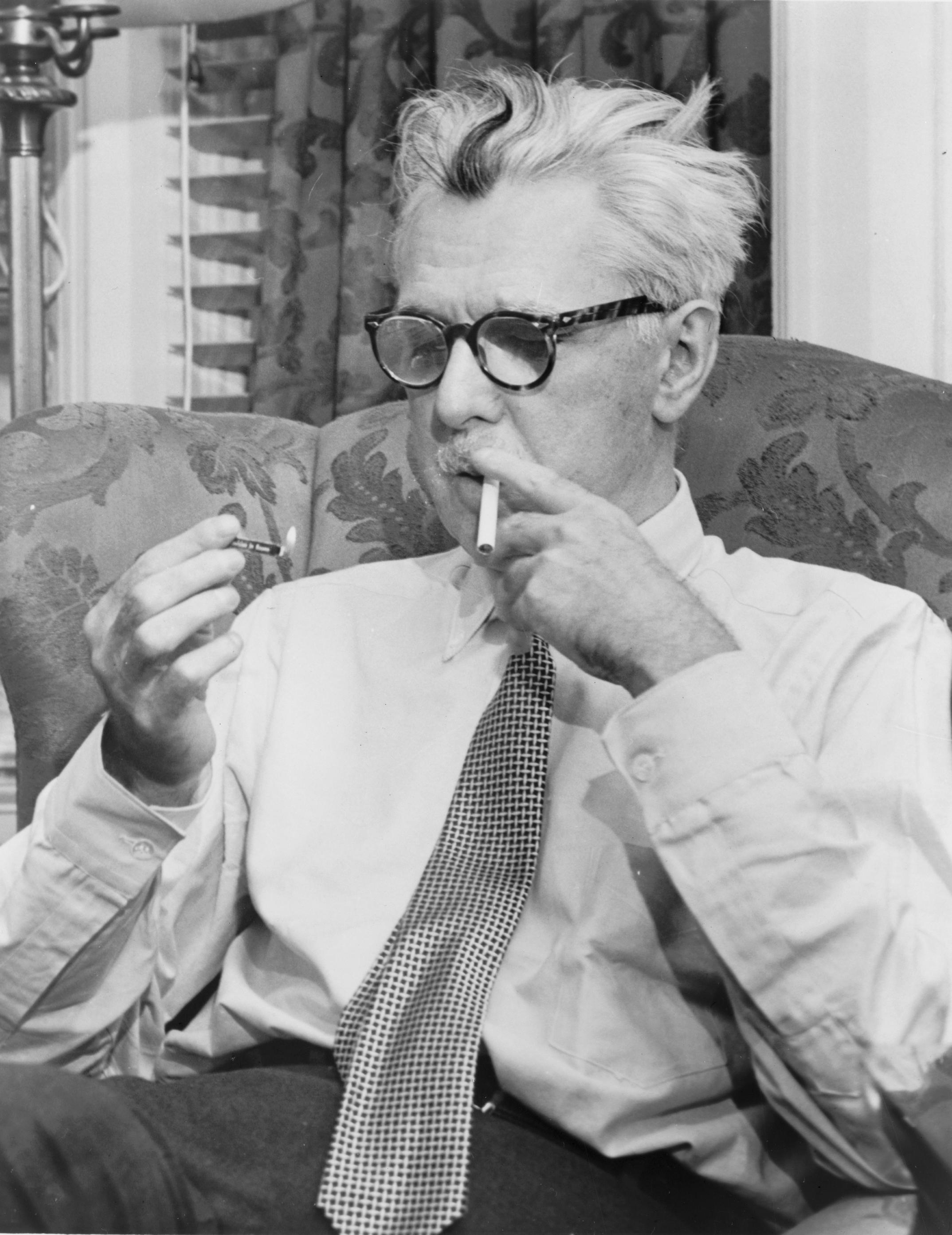
James Thurber

=== Music ===
Name	Original chapter	Initiation year	Notability	Ref.
Robert MacArthur Crawford	Ohio Epsilon	1920	Music composer known for writing "The U.S. Air Force" song	
John Driskell Hopkins	Georgia Alpha	1990	Grammy Award-winning bass guitarist and vocalist for Zac Brown Band	
Chris Jamison	Ohio Xi	2012	Finished in 3rd place in Season 7 of The Voice	
Rick Recht	California Delta	1989	Rock musician focused on Jewish culture	
Paul Winter	Illinois Alpha	1958	Six-time Grammy Award-nominated saxophonist	

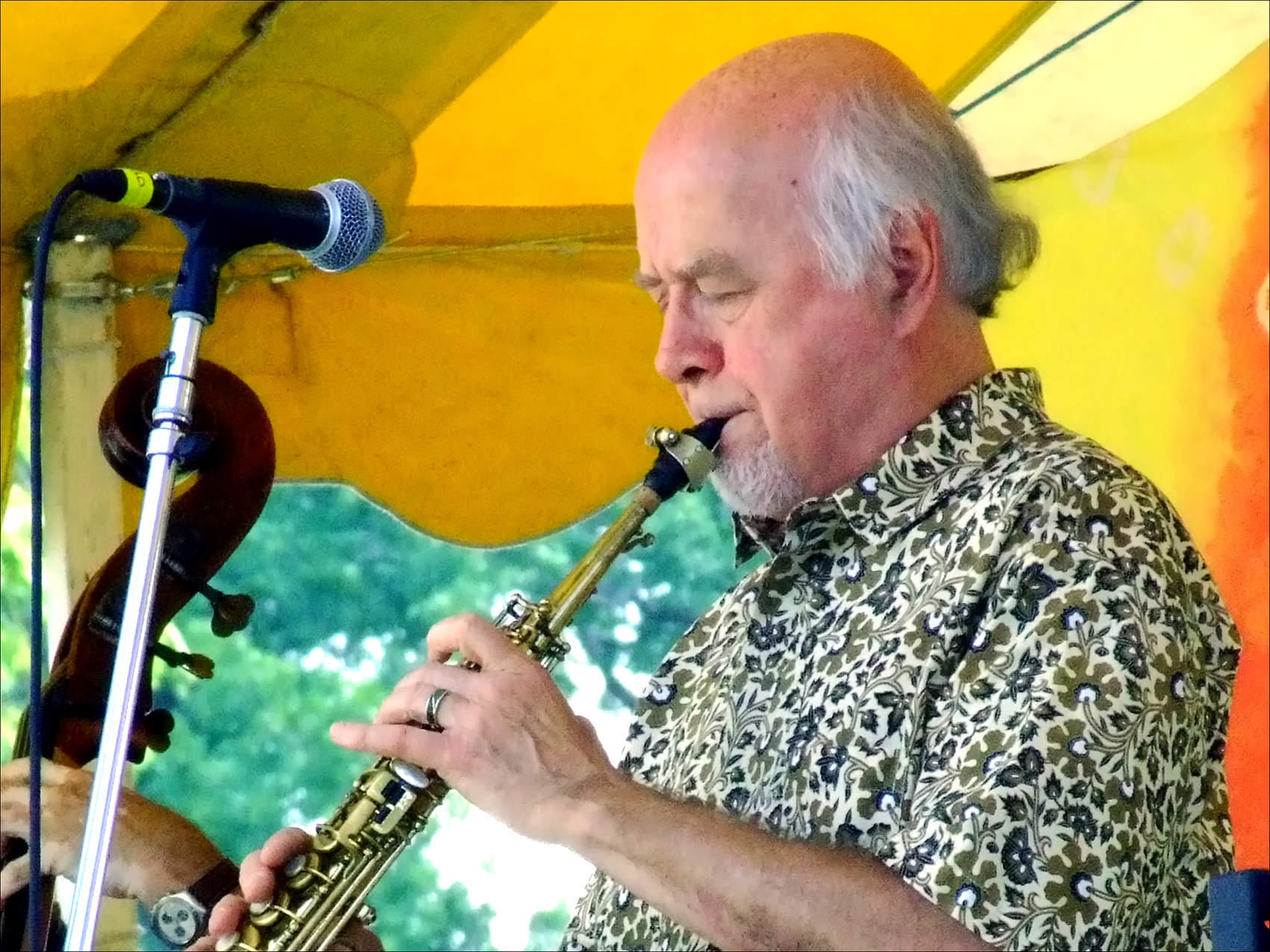
Paul Winter

=== Visual arts ===
Name	Original chapter	Initiation year	Notability	Ref.
Reynolds Beal	New York Alpha	1887	Painter of the impressionist, and then modernist art movements	
Enrique Martínez Celaya	New York Alpha	1983	Painter, sculptor, photographer and poet	
Roy Crane	Texas Alpha	1922	Reuben Award-winning nationally syndicated cartoonist and creator of the comic strip characters Wash Tubbs, Captain Easy, and Buz Sawyer; pioneered the adventure comic strip genre	
Harry Livingston French	New York Alpha	1890	Beaux-Arts architect	

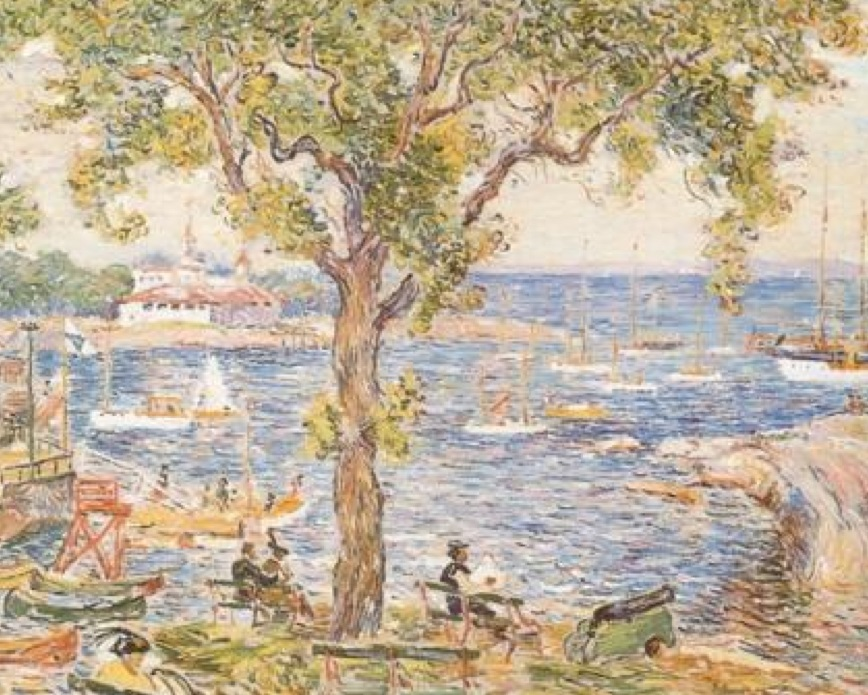
Echo Bay, New Rochelle by Reynolds Beal

== Business ==
Name	Original chapter	Initiation year	Notability	Ref.
John R. Donnell	Ohio Epsilon	1931	Oilman, banker and philanthropist; served on the board of the World Scout Foundation; 1958 recipient of the Silver Buffalo Award	
Herbert Dow	Ohio Epsilon	1906	Dow Chemical Company founder	
Bob Dudley	Illinois Delta	1974	CEO of BP (2010–present)	
Donald V. Fites	Indiana Epsilon	1953	Chairman and CEO of Caterpillar Inc. (1990–1999); Carnegie Endowment for International Peace trustee; Phi Kappa Psi Foundation trustee	
Bill Gross	North Carolina Alpha	1963	Co-founded PIMCO; investment author; former professional blackjack player; philatelist	
Warren Hellman	California Gamma	1952	Co-founded Hellman & Friedman; founding partner at Matrix Partners; past President of Lehman Brothers	
Tony Horton	Rhode Island Beta	1977	Exercise instructor; spokesman for the P90X home fitness program	
Lloyd Huck	Pennsylvania Lambda	1942	Former chairman of the board of Merck & Co.	
Michael A. Miles	Illinois Alpha	1958	Serves on the board of directors of Time Warner, Sears Holdings Corporation, Dell Inc., AMR Corporation, and Citadel Broadcasting Corporation; former chief executive officer of Kraft Foods and Philip Morris Companies	
Robert Warren Miller	New York Alpha	1952	Billionaire, entrepreneur, co-founder of DFS Group, and sailing champion	
Orra E. Monnette	Ohio Alpha	1891	Attorney, author and founder of the Bank of America; 13th President of Phi Kappa Psi (1912–1914)	
Howard C. Sheperd	Indiana Alpha	1913	Chairman of Citigroup (1952–1959)	
Mark Stevens	California Delta	1981	Partner and venture capitalist at Sequoia Capital	
Angus G. Wynne, Jr.	Texas Alpha	1933	Six Flags founder; CEO of Great Southwest Corp. and Great Southwest Industrial District	
Jerry Yang	California Beta	1987	Yahoo! co-founder and former CEO	

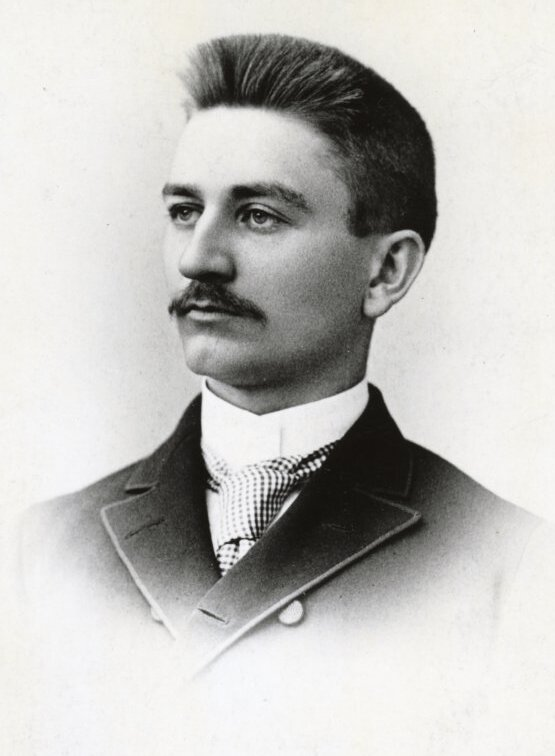
Herbert Dow

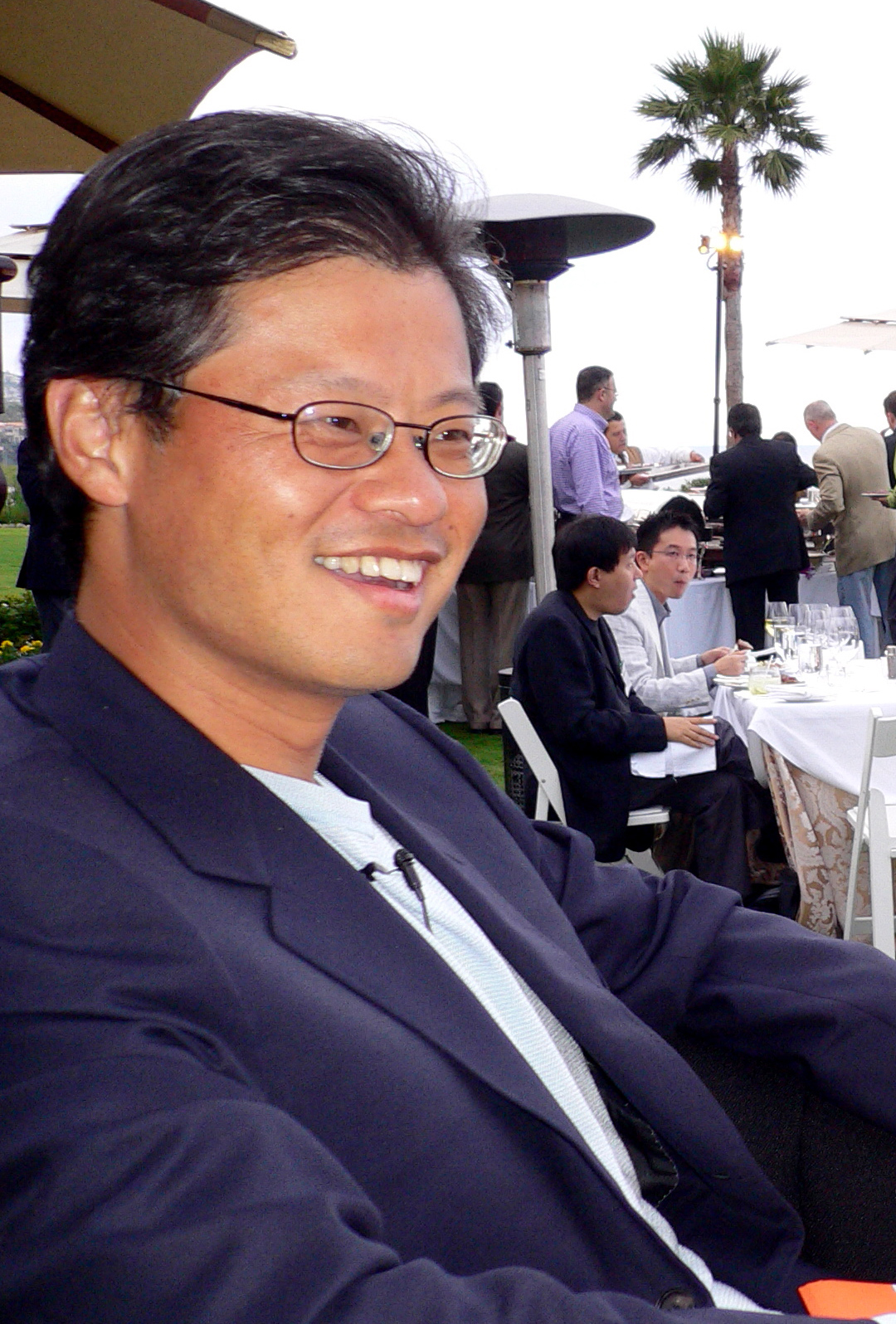
Jerry Yang

== Government, law, and public policy ==
=== President ===
Name	Original chapter	Initiation year	Notability	Ref.
Woodrow Wilson	Virginia Alpha	1879	President of the United States (1913–1921); Commander-in-Chief during World War I; Governor of New Jersey (1911–1913); President of Princeton University (1902–1910); Nobel Peace Prize recipient (1919) for promulgating the League of Nations and the Fourteen Points to end World War I; his presidency is noted for the Progressive Movement and a moral approach to foreign policy that set the tone for America's world posture still in place today	

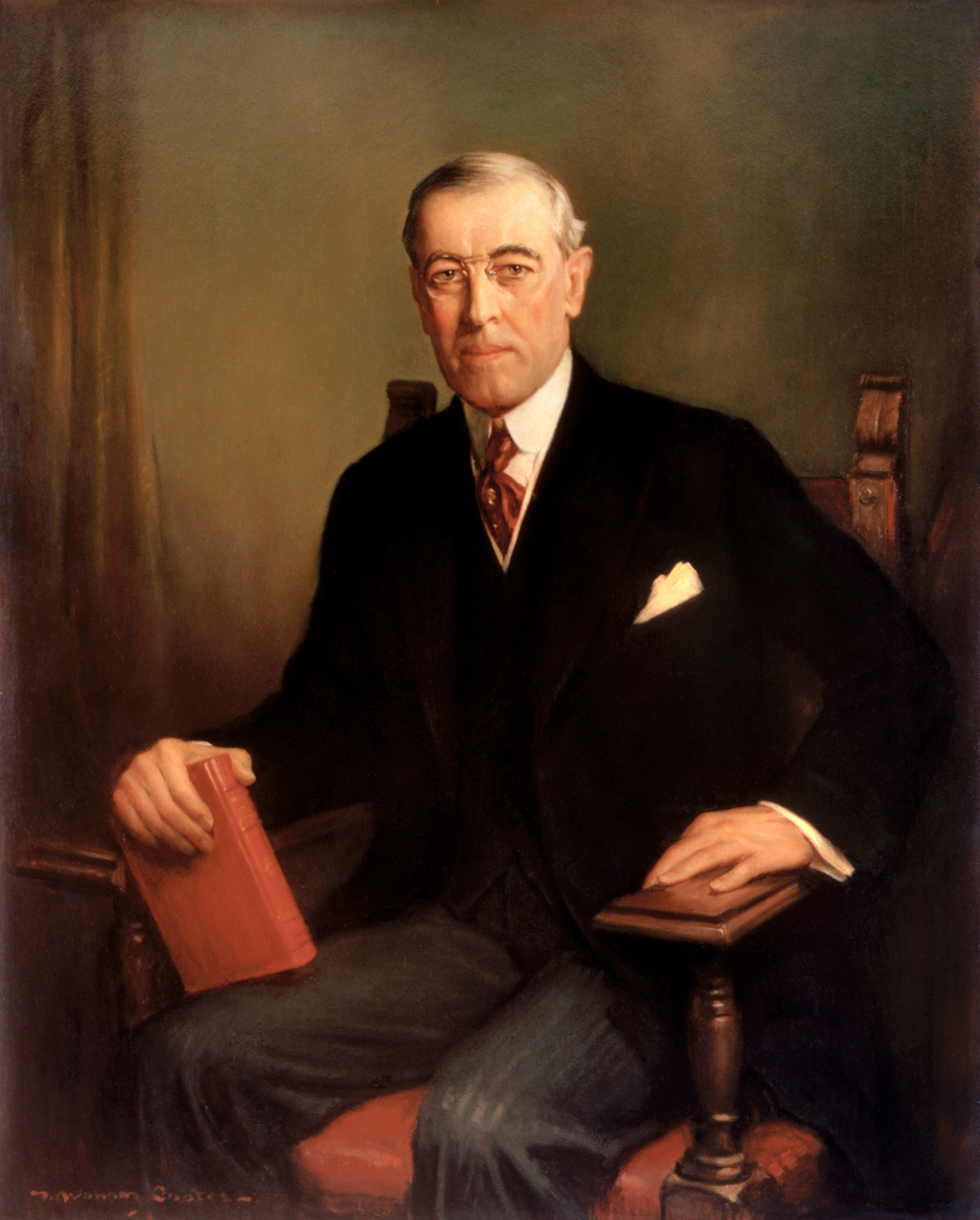
Woodrow Wilson

=== Cabinet and cabinet-level positions ===
Name	Original chapter	Initiation year	Notability	Ref.
Joseph W. Barr	Indiana Alpha	1936	United States Secretary of the Treasury (1968–1969); Undersecretary of the Treasury (1965–1968); Federal Deposit Insurance Corporation Chairman (1963–1965); U.S. Representative from Indiana (1959–1961)	
John T. Connor	New York Beta	1933	United States Secretary of Commerce (1965–1967)	
J. Edward Day	Illinois Beta	1939	United States Postmaster General (1961–1963)	
Mark Filip	Illinois Delta	1986	Acting United States Attorney General (2009); United States Deputy Attorney General (2008–2009)	
Stephen Hadley	New York Alpha	1966	U.S. National Security Advisor (2005–2009)	
George A. Jenks	Pennsylvania Alpha	1854	U.S. Solicitor General (1886–1889); U.S. Representative from Pennsylvania (1875–1877)	
A. Mitchell Palmer	Pennsylvania Kappa	1889	United States Attorney General (1919–1921); candidate for 1920 Democratic presidential nomination; U.S. Representative from Pennsylvania (1909–1915); famous in American history for the post-World War I Palmer Raids	
James M. Ridenour	Indiana Alpha	1961	Director of the National Park Service (1989–1993); Director of the Indiana Department of Natural Resources for eight years before becoming NPS director in April 1989, Vietnam War veteran; he served in the U.S. Army (1966–1969)	
Carl Schurz	New York Alpha	1870	United States Secretary of the Interior (1877–1881); U.S. Senator from Missouri (1869–1875); U.S. Minister to Spain (1861)	

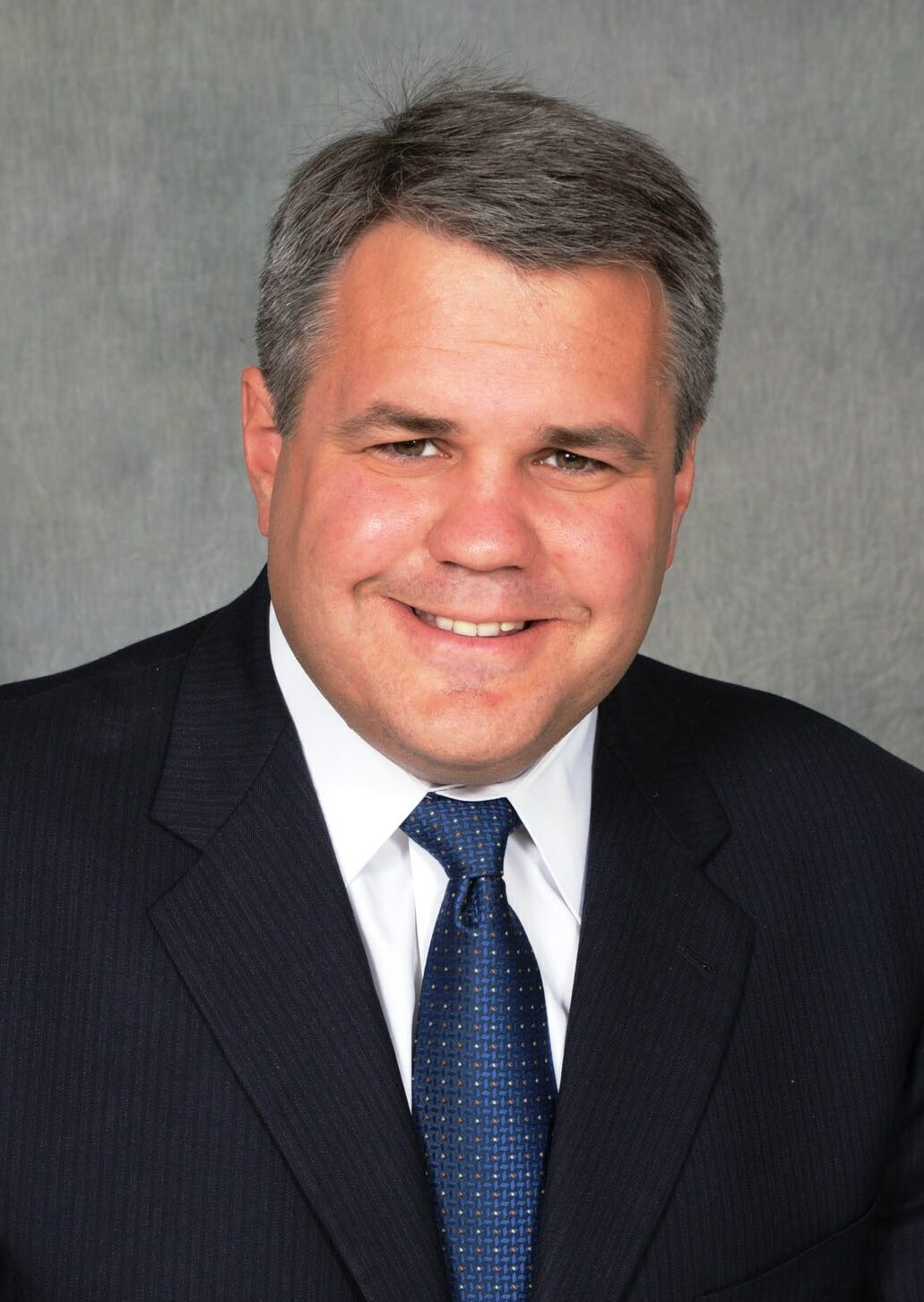
Mark Filip

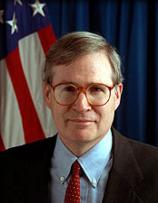
Stephen Hadley

=== Members of the United States Congress ===
Name	Original chapter	Initiation year	Notability	Ref.
Ernest F. Acheson	Pennsylvania Alpha	1873	U.S. Representative from Pennsylvania (1895–1909)	
Wilbur L. Adams	Pennsylvania Zeta	1902	U.S. Representative from Delaware (1933–1935)	
Henry T. Bannon	Ohio Delta	1885	U.S. Representative from Ohio (1905–1909)	
Laird Howard Barber	Pennsylvania Theta	1869	U.S. Representative from Pennsylvania (1899–1901)	
Arthur Laban Bates	Pennsylvania Beta	1876	U.S. Representative from Pennsylvania (1901–1913)	
Evan Bayh	Indiana Beta	1975	U.S. Senator from Indiana (1999–2011); Governor of Indiana (1989–1997); Secretary of State of Indiana (1987–1989)	
John Beatty	Ohio Alpha	1870	U.S. Representative from Ohio (1868–1873)	
Joseph M. Belford	Pennsylvania Zeta	1868	U.S. Representative from New York (1897–1899)	
Frank Eckels Beltzhoover	Pennsylvania Epsilon	1858	U.S. Representative from Ohio (1879–1883, 1891–1895)	
Henry H. Bingham	Pennsylvania Alpha	1858	U.S. Representative from Pennsylvania (1879–1912); Medal of Honor recipient as a Union Army officer at the Battle of the Wilderness; conveyed the personal effects of Confederate General L. Armistead to Union General W. Hancock at the Battle of Gettysburg	
Bruce Braley	Iowa Beta	1976	U.S. Representative from Iowa (2007–2015)	
James E. Bromwell	Iowa Alpha	1939	U.S. Representative from Iowa (1961–1965)	
Joseph W. Byrns, Jr.	Tennessee Delta	1924	U.S. Representative from Tennessee (1939–1941)	
William H. Calkins	Indiana Alpha	1883	U.S. Representative from Indiana (1877–1883)	
George Earle Chamberlain	Virginia Beta	1872	U.S. Senator from Oregon (1909–1921); Chairman of the Senate Armed Services Committee (1913–1919); Governor of Oregon (1903–1909)	
Edwin V. Champion	Illinois Delta	1908	U.S. Representative from Illinois (1937–1939)	
Ralph E. Church	Illinois Alpha	1908	U.S. Representative from Illinois (1935–1941, 1943–1950)	
James Cooney	Missouri Alpha	1869	U.S. Representative from Missouri (1897–1903)	
Paul Coverdell	Missouri Alpha	1959	U.S. Senator from Georgia (1993–2000); Director of the Peace Corps (1989–1991); Georgia State Senator (1970–1989); sponsored federal legislation creating the Coverdell Education Savings Accounts	
William J. Crow	Pennsylvania Zeta	1922	U.S. Representative from Pennsylvania (1947–1949)	
Thomas Henry Dale	Pennsylvania Theta	1892	U.S. Representative from Pennsylvania (1905–1907)	
Robert Daniel	Virginia Alpha	1955	U.S. Representative from Virginia (1973–1983)	
Charlie Dent	Pennsylvania Lambda	1982	U.S. Representative from Pennsylvania (2005–present); Pennsylvania State Senate#Membership (1999–2004); Pennsylvania State Representative (1991–1998)	
Winfield K. Denton	Indiana Alpha	1915	U.S. Representative from Indiana (1949–1953, 1955–1966)	
Clarence Dill	Ohio Alpha	1906	U.S. Senator from Washington (1923–1935); U.S. Representative from Washington (1915–1919)	
P. Henry Dugro	New York Gamma	1874	U.S. Representative from New York (1881–1883)	
Allan C. Durborow, Jr.	Indiana Beta	1877	U.S. Representative from Indiana (1891–1895)	
Hamilton G. Ewart	South Carolina Alpha	1870	U.S. Representative from South Carolina (1889–1891); mayor of Hendersonville, North Carolina (1878–1879)	
George W. Faris	Indiana Alpha	1870	U.S. Representative from Indiana (1895–1901)	
David E. Finley	South Carolina Alpha	1886	U.S. Representative from South Carolina (1899–1917)	
Joseph B. Foraker	Ohio Alpha	1866	U.S. Senator from Ohio (1897–1909); Governor of Ohio (1886–1890); candidate for 1908 Republican presidential nomination; first President of Phi Kappa Psi (1886–1888); founder of Phi Psi's New York Alpha chapter at Cornell University	
Ralph W. Gwinn	Indiana Alpha	1901	U.S. Representative from New York (1945–1959)	
T. Millet Hand	Pennsylvania Zeta	1919	U.S. Representative from New Jersey (1945–1956); Mayor of Cape May (1937–1944)	
Thomas W. Harrison	Virginia Alpha	1867	U.S. Representative from Virginia (1916–1921)	
Charles S. Hartman	Indiana Gamma	1879	U.S. Representative from Indiana (1893–1899)	
Daniel Brodhead Heiner	Pennsylvania Zeta	1873	U.S. Representative from Pennsylvania (1893–1897)	
Charles Henderson	California Beta	1892	U.S. Senator from Nevada (1918–1921)	
Thomas J. Henderson	Pennsylvania Alpha	1855	U.S. Representative from Illinois (1875–1895)	
Charles L. Henry	Indiana Alpha	1868	U.S. Representative from Indiana (1895–1899)	
Frederick C. Hicks	Pennsylvania Kappa	1890	U.S. Representative from Pennsylvania (1915–1923)	
J. French Hill	Tennessee Delta	1976	U.S. Representative from Arkansas (2015–present)	
John D. Hoblitzell, Jr.	West Virginia Alpha	1931	U.S. Senator from West Virginia (1958)	
Herschel M. Hogg	Illinois Gamma	1873	U.S. Representative from Colorado (1903–1907)	
Craig Hosmer	California Gamma	1934	U.S. Representative from California (1953–1974)	
Charles J. Hughes, Jr.	Missouri Alpha	1872	U.S. Senator from Colorado (1909–1911)	
John S. Jones	Ohio Alpha	1861	U.S. Representative from Ohio (1877–1879)	
J. Warren Keifer	Ohio Beta	1868	U.S. Representative from Ohio (1877–1885); Speaker of the House (1881–1883); served as a U.S. Army general in both the Civil War and Spanish–American War	
William S. Kenyon	Iowa Alpha	1886	U.S. Senator from Iowa (1911–1922); justice of the United States Court of Appeals for the Eighth Circuit (1922–1933); considered for the 1924 Republican presidential and vice presidential nominations, and for appointment to the U.S. Supreme Court in 1930 and 1932	
Thomas Kuchel	California Delta	1929	U.S. Senator from California (1953–1969); Senate Minority Whip (1959–1969); co-floor manager for the Civil Rights Act of 1964 and the Voting Rights Act of 1965	
George Swinton Legaré	South Carolina Alpha	1889	U.S. Representative from South Carolina (1903–1913)	
Edward C. Little	Kansas Alpha	1878	U.S. Representative from Kansas (1919–1924)	
Edward L. Martin	Virginia Alpha	1857	U.S. Representative from Delaware (1879–1883)	
Sam C. Massingale	Mississippi Alpha	1889	U.S. Representative from Oklahoma (1935–1941)	
Addison S. McClure	Pennsylvania Alpha	1855	U.S. Representative from Ohio (1895–1897)	
John Y. McCollister	Iowa Alpha	1941	U.S. Representative from Nebraska (1971–1977)	
Welty McCullogh	Pennsylvania Alpha	1868	U.S. Representative from Pennsylvania (1887–1889)	
James McKinney	Illinois Gamma	1874	U.S. Representative from Illinois (1905–1913)	
Clarence B. Miller	Minnesota Beta	1891	U.S. Representative from Minnesota (1909–1919)	
Hugh Mitchell	New Hampshire Alpha	1927	U.S. Representative from Washington (1949–1953); U.S. Senator from Washington (1945–1946)	
John I. Mitchell	Pennsylvania Gamma	1881	U.S. Senator from Pennsylvania (1881–1887); U.S. Representative from Pennsylvania (1877–1881)	
Hunter Holmes Moss, Jr.	West Virginia Alpha	1895	U.S. Representative from West Virginia (1913–1916)	
James C. Needham	California Alpha	1884	U.S. Representative from California (1899–1913)	
James Ellsworth Noland	Indiana Beta	1939	U.S. Representative from Indiana (1949–1951)	
Henry Page	Virginia Alpha	1859	U.S. Representative from Maryland (1891–1892)	
William H. Perry	South Carolina Alpha	1857	U.S. Representative from South Carolina (1885–1891); served as a Confederate Army officer	
Samuel R. Peters	Ohio Alpha	1861	U.S. Representative from Kansas (1883–1891); served as a Union Army officer	
Peter A. Peyser	New York Epsilon	1942	U.S. Representative from New York (1971–1977, 1979–1983)	
John Pickler	Iowa Alpha	1867	U.S. Representative from South Dakota (1889–1897)	
Hugh H. Price	Wisconsin Alpha	1878	U.S. Representative from Wisconsin (1887)	
William J. Randall	Missouri Alpha	1932	U.S. Representative from Missouri (1959–1977)	
Robert F. Rich	Pennsylvania Zeta	1903	U.S. Representative from Pennsylvania (1930–1943, 1945–1951)	
William Nathaniel Rogers	New Hampshire Alpha	1912	U.S. Representative from New Hampshire (1923–1925)	
William S. Shallenberger	Pennsylvania Gamma	1859	U.S. Representative from Pennsylvania (1877–1883)	
Don L. Short	Minnesota Beta	1924	U.S. Representative from North Dakota (1959–1965)	
Ellison D. Smith	South Carolina Alpha	1885	U.S. Senator from South Carolina (1909–1944); South Carolina State Representative (1896–1900); known as "Cotton Ed," Chairman of the Senate Committee on Agriculture and Forestry	
Martin L. Smyser	Ohio Beta	1867	U.S. Representative from Ohio (1889–1891, 1905–1907)	
Hubert D. Stephens	Mississippi Alpha	1894	U.S. Senator from Mississippi (1923–1935); U.S. Representative from Mississippi (1911–1921)	
Charles Sumner	Indiana Alpha	1867	U.S. Senator from Massachusetts (1851–1874)	
Frank Sundstrom	New York Alpha	1920	U.S. Representative from New Jersey (1943–1949); inducted into the College Football Hall of Fame in 1978	
Dean P. Taylor	New York Epsilon	1922	U.S. Representative from New York (1943–1961)	
David Gardiner Tyler	Virginia Beta	1867	U.S. Representative from Virginia (1893–1897); Virginia State Senator (1891–1892, 1900–1904); Confederate Army veteran; son of U.S. President John Tyler	
James A. Walker	Virginia Alpha	1854	U.S. Representative from Virginia (1895–1899); Lieutenant Governor of Virginia (1878–1882); Brigadier General, Confederate States Army; Commander of the Stonewall Brigade (May 14, 1863 – May 12, 1864) and Early's Division (1865)	
James Eli Watson	Indiana Alpha	1881	U.S. Senator from Indiana (1916–1933); Majority Leader (1929–1933); U.S. Representative from Indiana (1895–1897, 1899–1909); Republican Party Whip (1905–1909); credited with originating the saying "If you can't lick 'em, jine 'em"	
Earle D. Willey	Pennsylvania Zeta	1907	U.S. Representative from Delaware (1943–1945)	
George S. Williams	Pennsylvania Zeta	1897	U.S. Representative from Delaware (1939–1941)	
James R. Williams	Indiana Beta	1874	U.S. Representative from Illinois (1889–1895, 1899–1905)	
Boyd Winchester	Virginia Alpha	1855	U.S. Representative from Kentucky (1869–1873)	
Larry Winn	Kansas Alpha	1938	U.S. Representative from Kansas (1967–1985)	
Simon Peter Wolverton	Pennsylvania Gamma	1857	U.S. Representative from Pennsylvania (1891–1895)	
Dudley G. Wooten	Virginia Alpha	1877	U.S. Representative from Texas (1901–1903)	
Seth H. Yocum	Pennsylvania Zeta	1859	U.S. Representative from Pennsylvania (1879–1881)	

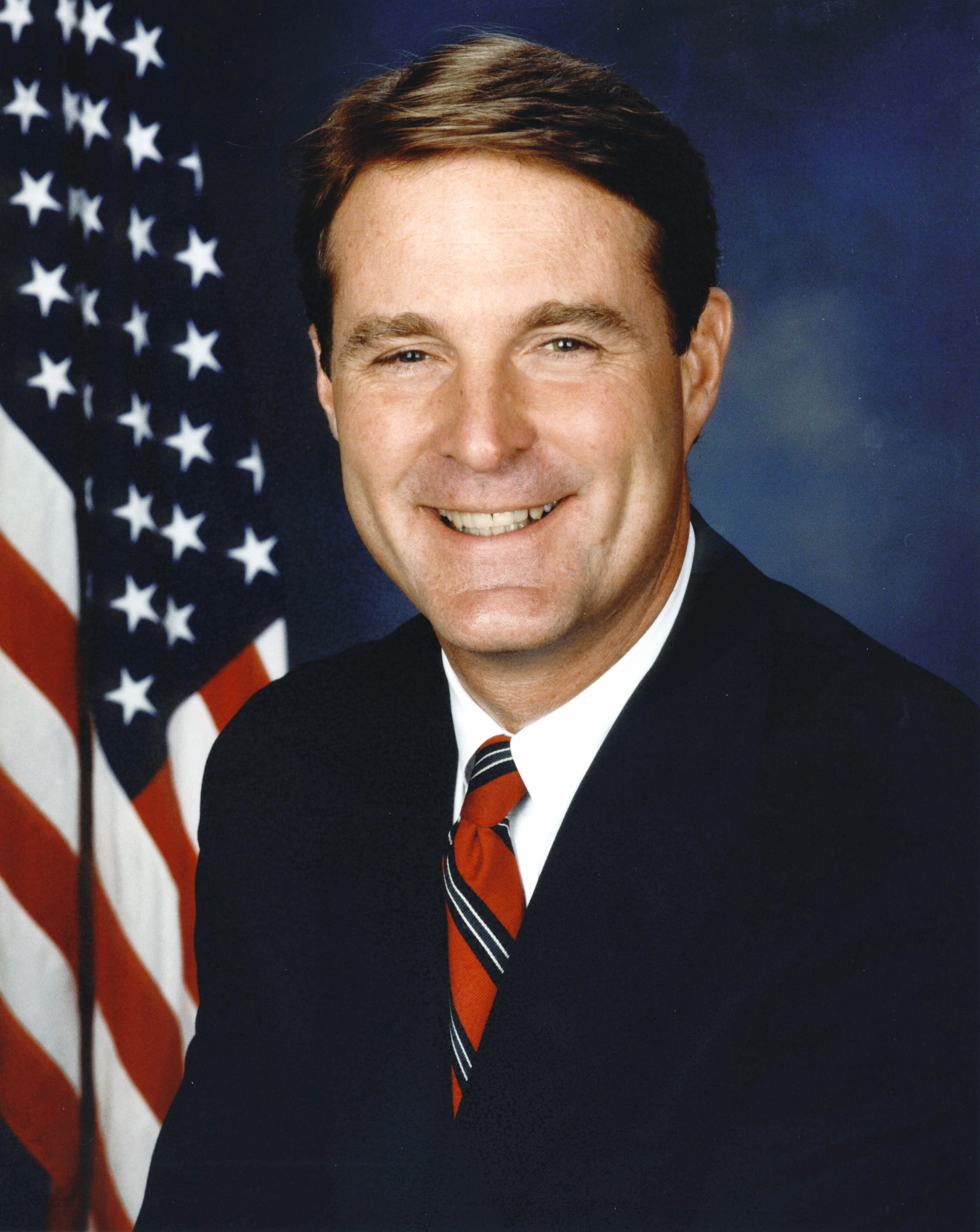
Evan Bayh

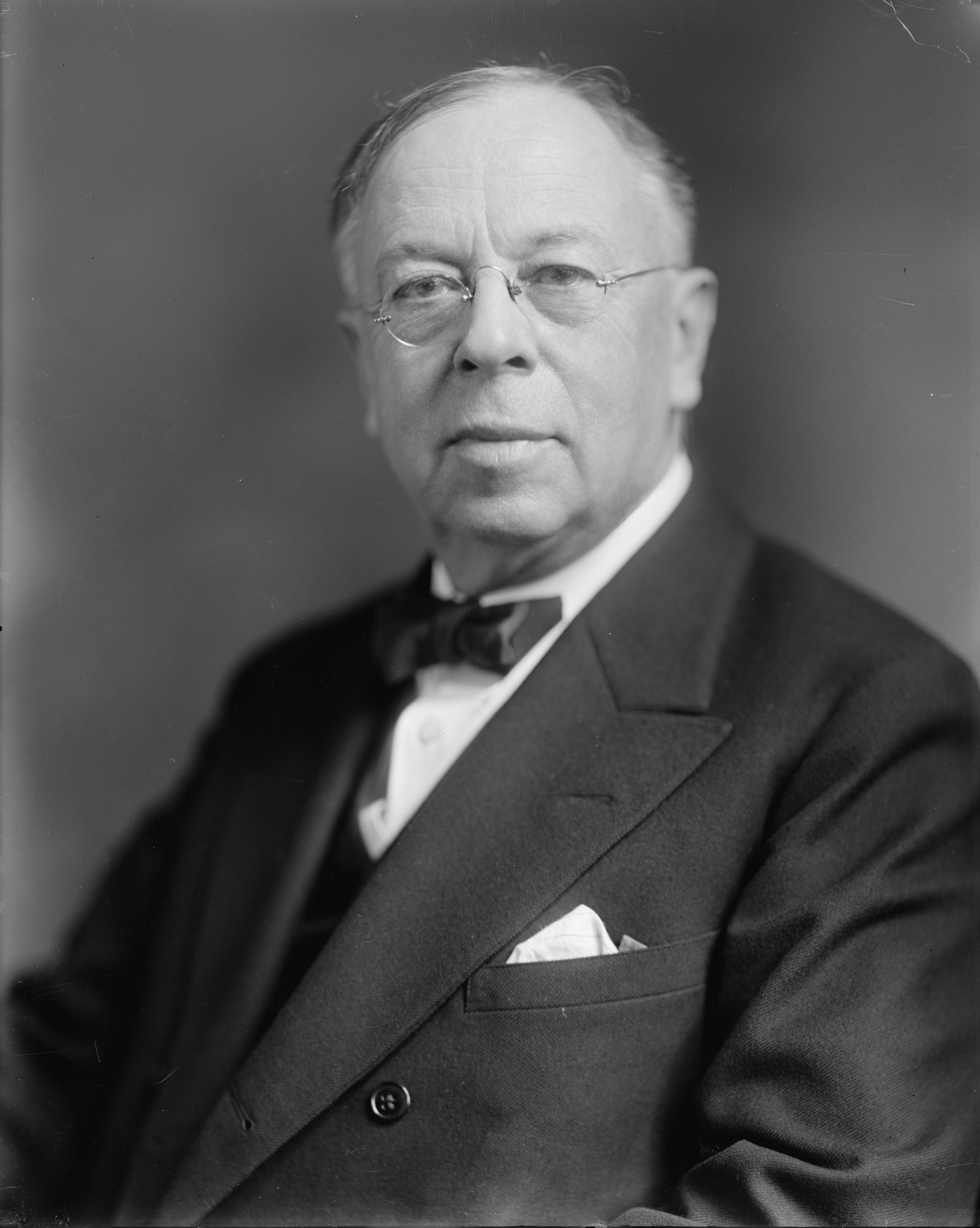
George E. Chamberlain

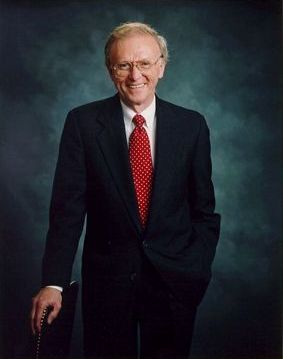
Paul Coverdell

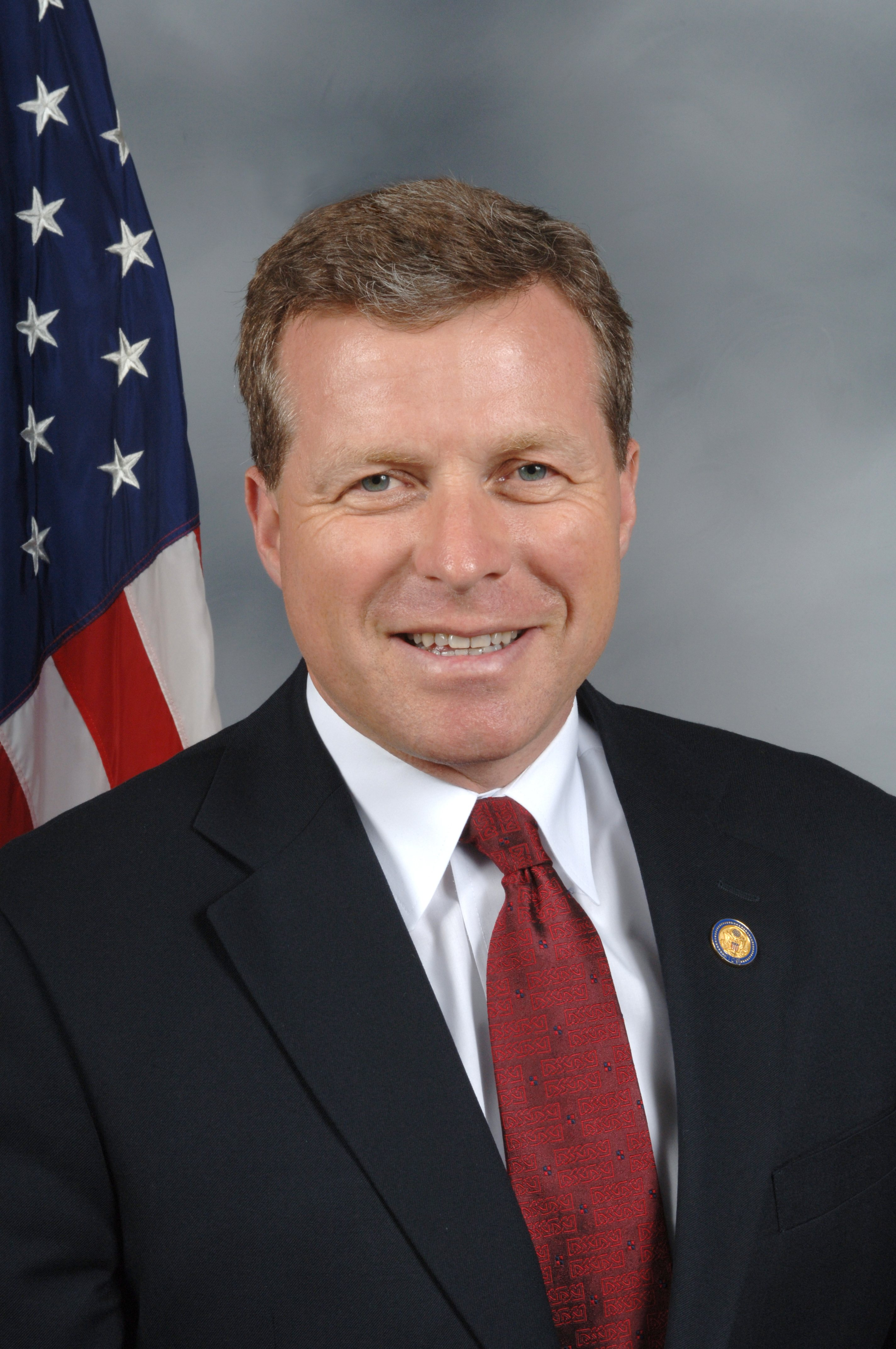
Charlie Dent

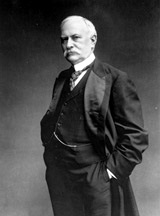
Joseph B. Foraker

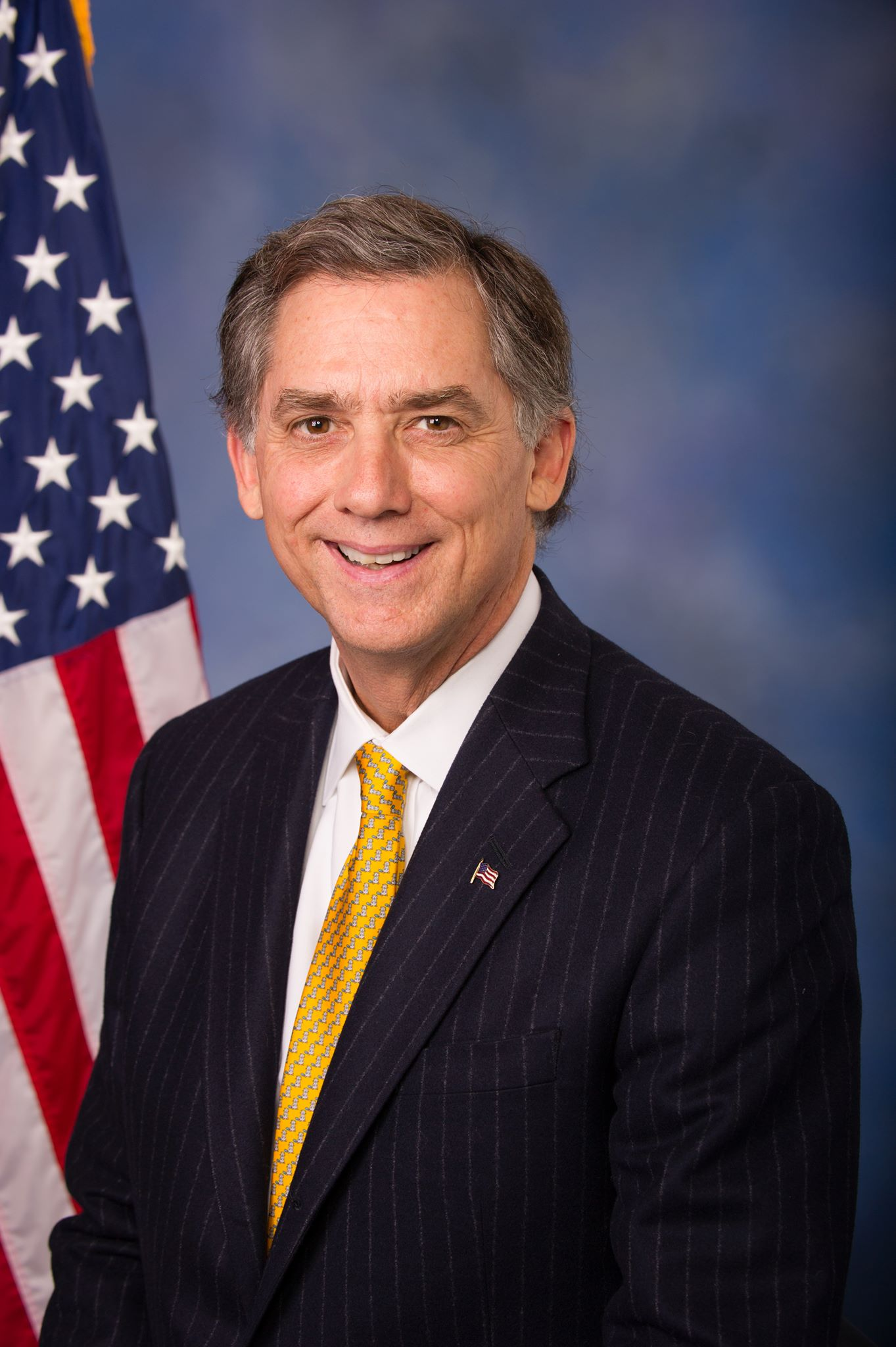
French Hill

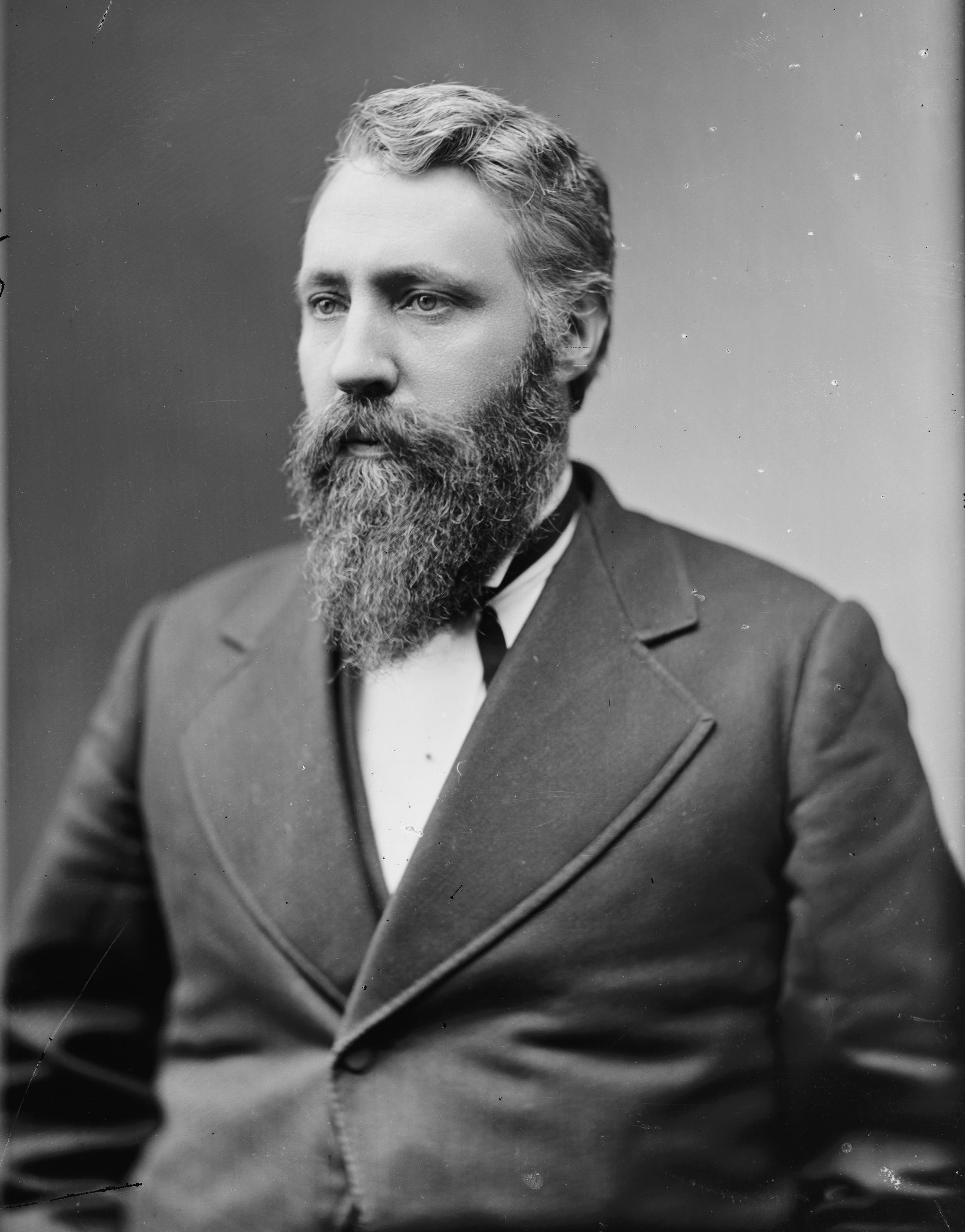
J. Warren Keifer

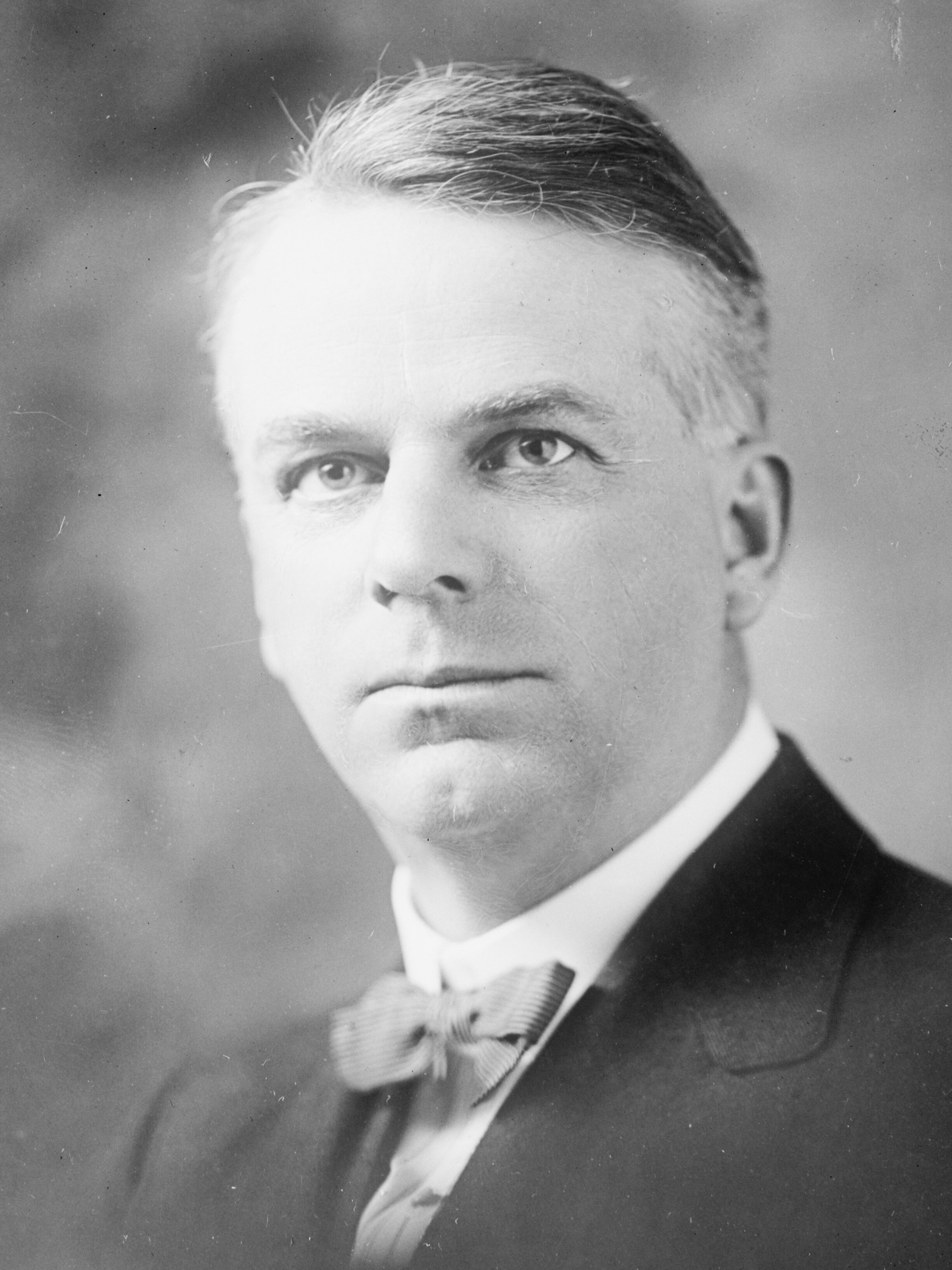
William S. Kenyon

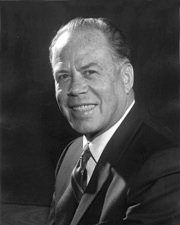
Thomas Kuchel

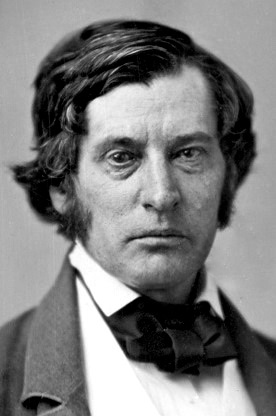
Charles Sumner

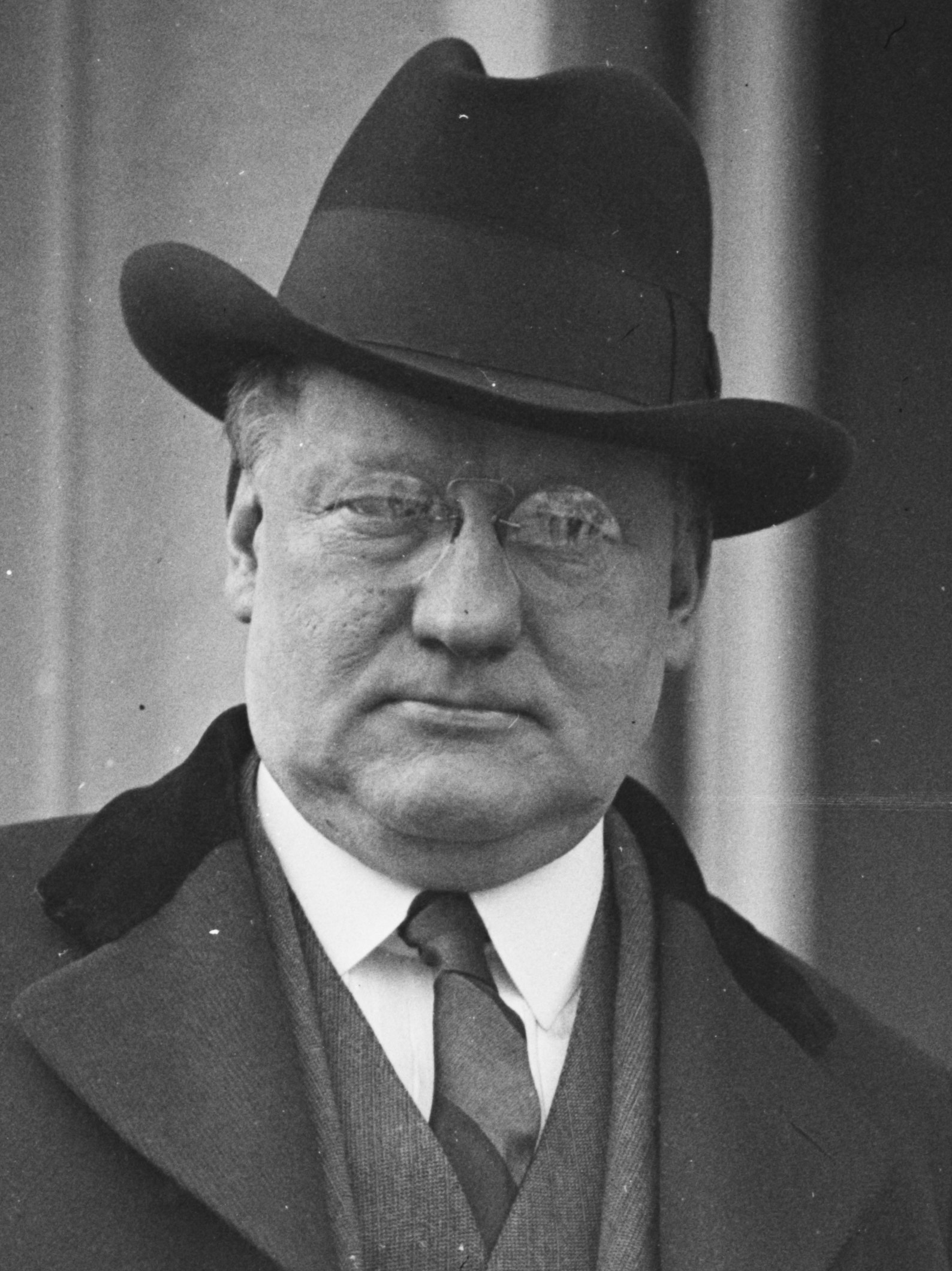
James Eli Watson

=== United States Supreme Court ===
Name	Original chapter	Initiation year	Notability	Ref.
Pierce Butler	Minnesota Alpha	1885	Associate Justice of the Supreme Court of the United States (1922–1939); President of the Minnesota State Bar Association (1908); known as one of the court's "Four Horsemen" who opposed New Deal legislation	

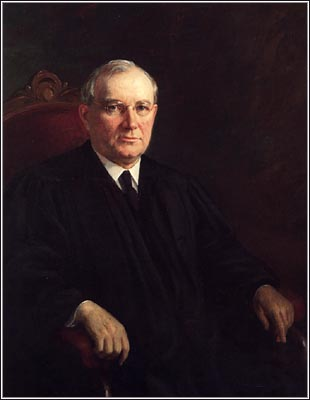
Pierce Butler

=== U.S. governors and lieutenant governors ===
Name	Original chapter	Initiation year	Notability	Ref.
Newton W. Gilbert	Ohio Delta	1882	Governor-General of the Philippines (1907–1908); U.S. Representative from Indiana (1905–1906); Lieutenant Governor of Indiana (1901–1905)	
James P. Goodrich	Indiana Alpha	1885	Governor of Indiana (1917–1921); candidate for 1920 Republican presidential nomination	
Homer A. Holt	Virginia Beta	1916	Governor of West Virginia (1937–1941); Attorney General of West Virginia (1933–1937)	
Lawrence M. Judd	Pennsylvania Iota	1907	Territorial Governor of Hawaii (1929–1934); Governor of American Samoa (1953)	
William Preston Lane, Jr.	Virginia Alpha	1910	Governor of Maryland (1947–1951); Attorney General of Maryland (1930–1934)	
Lloyd Lowndes, Jr.	Pennsylvania Beta	1864	Governor of Maryland (1895–1899); U.S. Representative from Maryland (1873–1875)	
Raymond P. Shafer	Pennsylvania Beta	1935	Governor of Pennsylvania (1967–1971); Lieutenant Governor of Pennsylvania (1963–1967); Pennsylvania State Senator (1959–1962)	
William Cameron Sproul	Pennsylvania Kappa	1889	Governor of Pennsylvania (1919–1923); candidate for 1920 Republican presidential nomination; namesake of Sproul State Forest	
William Ellery Sweet	Pennsylvania Kappa	1889	Governor of Colorado (1923–1925)	

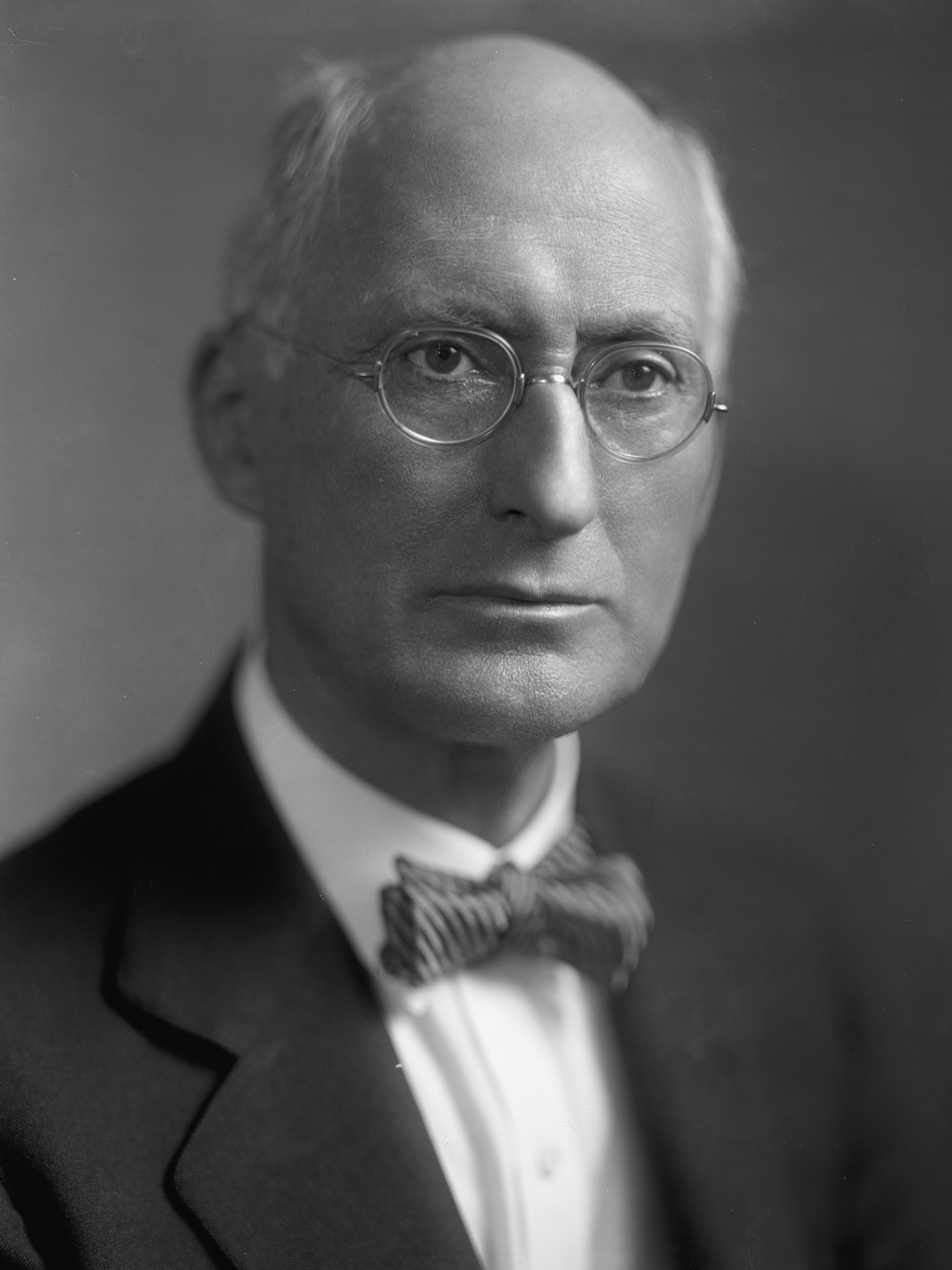
James Goodrich

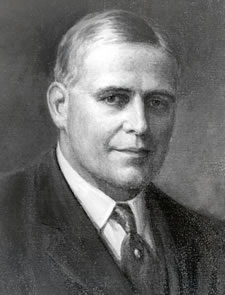
William C. Sproul

=== Mayors ===
Name	Original chapter	Initiation year	Notability	Ref.
Michael Bloomberg	Maryland Alpha	1961	Mayor of New York City (2002–2013); founder of Bloomberg L.P.	
James Brainard	Indiana Zeta	1973	Mayor of Carmel, Indiana (2003–present)	
Paul Helmke	Indiana Beta	1970	President of Brady Campaign to Prevent Gun Violence (2006–2011); Mayor of Fort Wayne (1987–1999)	
Frank W. Burke	California Delta	1939	Mayor of Louisville (1969–1973); U.S. Representative from Kentucky (1959–1963)	
Daniel P. Meyer	New York Alpha	1984	Director of Whistleblowing & Transparency, Office of the Inspector General, U.S. Department of Defense, Mayor of Burkittsville, Maryland (2000–2004)	

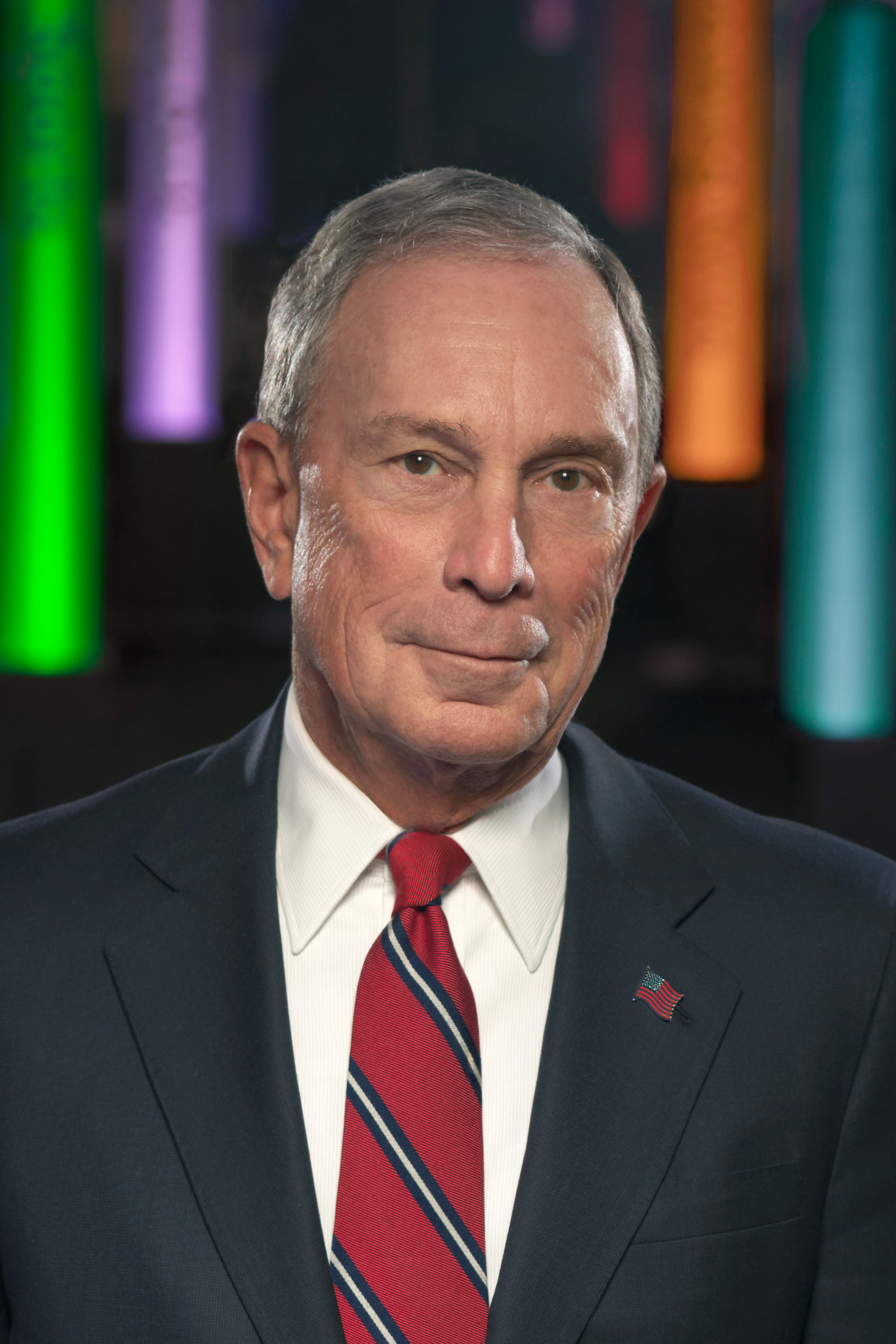
Mike Bloomberg

=== State and local legislators ===
Name	Original chapter	Initiation year	Notability	Ref.
Earl Ehrhart	Georgia Alpha	1978	Georgia State Representative (1989–2019)	
Robert J. Garagiola	New Jersey Gamma	1991	Maryland State Senator (2002–2013, Majority Leader)	
Bryan Pratt	Missouri Alpha	1992	Missouri State Representative (2003–2011, Speaker Pro Tem)	
Jeff Pyle	West Virginia Alpha	1983	Pennsylvania State Representative (2005–2021)	
Scott T. Rupp	Missouri Alpha	1994	Missouri Public Service Commission (2014-present); Missouri State Senator (2006–2014); Missouri State Representative (2003–2006)	
David Shafer	Georgia Alpha	1983	Georgia State Senator (2002–2019)	
Tracy Stafford	Florida Beta	1967	Florida State Representative (1990–2000)	

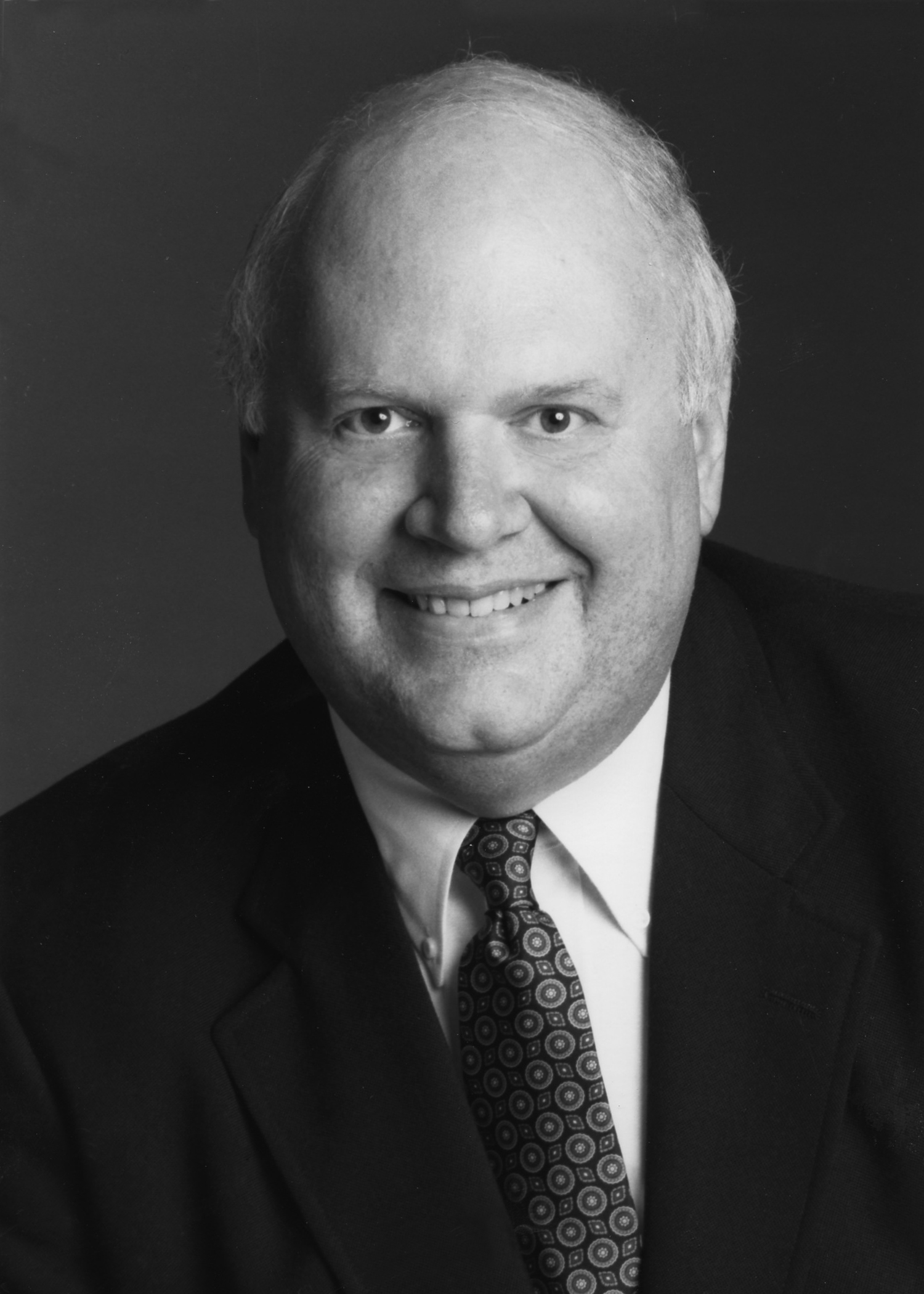
Tracy Stafford

=== Diplomats ===
Name	Original chapter	Initiation year	Notability	Ref.
Burton Y. Berry	Indiana Beta	1920	United States Ambassador to Iraq (1952–1954)	
Edward P. C. Lewis	Virginia Alpha	1854	United States Ambassador to Portugal (1885–1889)	
Herbert B. Powell	Oregon Alpha	1923	United States Ambassador to New Zealand (1963–1967); Commanding General of the Third United States Army (1960)	
Boyd Winchester	Virginia Alpha	1855	United States Ambassador to Switzerland (1885–1889); U.S. Representative from Kentucky (1869–1873); Kentucky State Senator (1867–1868)	

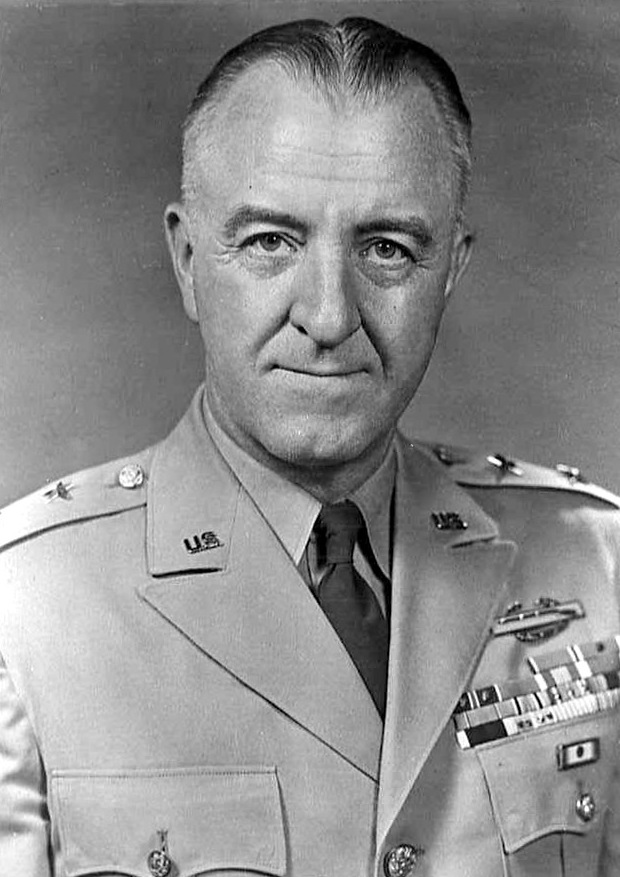
Herbert Powell

=== Judges and lawyers ===
Name	Original chapter	Initiation year	Notability	Ref.
Leslie Boslaugh	Nebraska Alpha	1941	Justice of the Nebraska Supreme Court	
John W. Davis	Virginia Beta	1889	Democratic presidential nominee (1924); President of the American Bar Association (1922–1923); United States Ambassador to the United Kingdom (1918–1921); U.S. Solicitor General (1913–1918); U.S. Representative from West Virginia (1911–1913)	
James D. Fellers	Oklahoma Alpha	1932	President of the American Bar Association (1974–1975)	
Franklin Ferriss	New York Alpha	1870	Special Master - United States v. Standard Oil Company; Justice of the Missouri Supreme Court (1910–1912)	
Theodore G. Garfield	Iowa Alpha	1912	Justice on the Iowa Supreme Court (1941–1969); Chief Justice (1961–1969)	
Whitney R. Harris	Washington Alpha	1930	Prosecutor at the Nuremberg Trials, namesake of the Whitney R. Harris World Law Institute at the Washington University School of Law	
Joseph Welles Henderson	Pennsylvania Gamma	1905	President of the American Bar Association (1943–1944)	
Glenn Kirschner	Virginia Beta	1980	Chief of Homicide Section of United States Attorney for the District of Columbia office, portrayed in “Georgetown (film)” (2019) and NBC News/MSNBC legal analyst.	
Charles Page Thomas Moore	Pennsylvania Alpha	1852	Founder of Phi Kappa Psi; Justice of the Supreme Court of Appeals of West Virginia (1871–1881)	
John Patterson Rea	Ohio Alpha	1865	Grand Army of the Republic Commander-in-Chief (1887–1888); Judge of Probate, Hennepin County, Minnesota (1877–1881); editor of the Minneapolis Tribune (1875–1877); third President of Phi Kappa Psi (1890–1892)	
Kingsley A. Taft	Massachusetts Alpha	1921	Chief Justice of the Ohio Supreme Court (1963–1970); U.S. Senator from Ohio (1946–1947)	

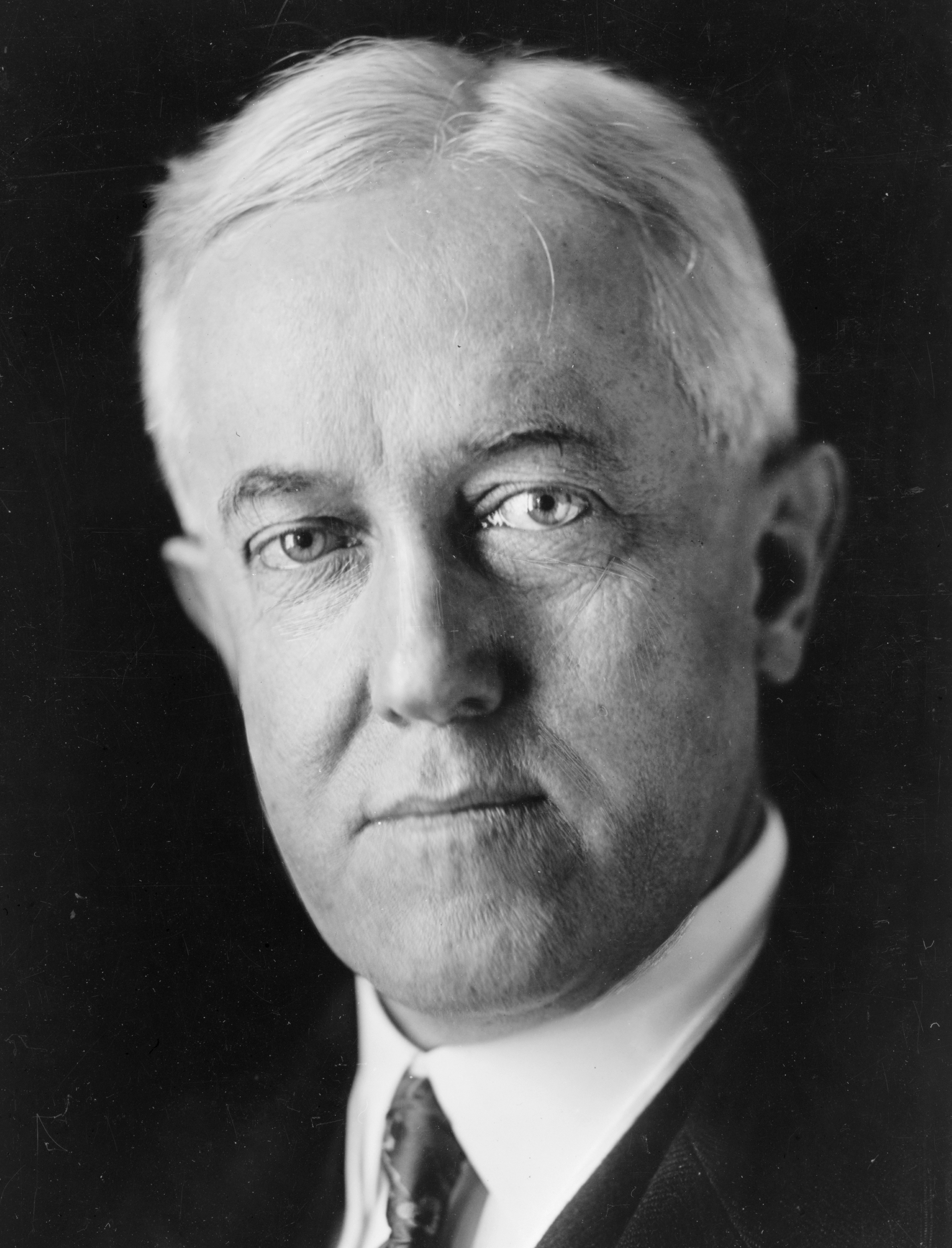
John W. Davis

=== Other U.S. political and legal figures ===
Name	Original chapter	Initiation year	Notability	Ref.
Joseph Blatchford	California Epsilon	1953	Director of the Peace Corps (1969–1971)	
William J. Donovan	New York Gamma	1903	Known as the "Father of American Intelligence;" Freedom Award recipient (1959); founder and Director of the Office of Strategic Services (precursor of the CIA) during World War II; World War I Medal of Honor recipient; United States Ambassador to Thailand (1953–1954)	
Ernest O. Thompson	Texas Alpha	1913	Texas Railroad Commission's chairman and longest-serving member (1933–1965); Mayor of Amarillo, Texas (1929–1932); Lieutenant General, United States Army; Commanding General, Texas National Guard	
Luigi Mangione	Pennsylvania Alpha	c. 2018	Former member of Phi Kappa Psi; indicted in connection with the 2024 killing of UnitedHealthcare CEO Brian Thompson in New York City; pleaded not guilty as of 2025	

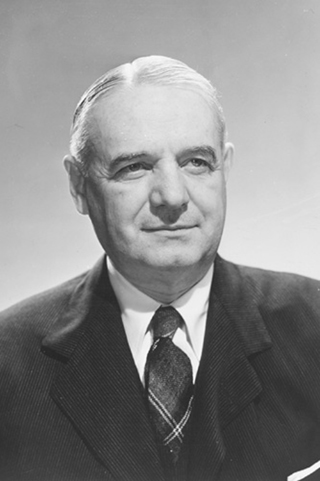
William Donovan

== Military ==
Name	Original chapter	Initiation year	Notability	Ref.
Stephen Ailes	West Virginia Alpha	1934	United States Secretary of the Army (1964–1965)	
Scott C. Black	California Eta	1974	37th Judge Advocate General of the United States Army (2005–2009)	
Tasker H. Bliss	Pennsylvania Gamma	1870	General, United States Army; Chief of Staff of the United States Army during World War I (1917–1918)	
Lynn Compton	California Epsilon	1940	United States Army; Portrayed in HBO miniseries Band of Brothers by Neal McDonough; recipient of the Silver Star	
Walter B. Huffman	Texas Beta	1964	Dean of Texas Tech University School of Law (2002–2010); 35th Judge Advocate General of the United States Army (1997–2001)	
John A. Hull	Iowa Alpha	1890	15th Judge Advocate General of the United States Army (1924–1928)	
William Campbell Langfitt	Ohio Delta	1880	Major General, United States Army; chief of staff and chief engineer for the American Expeditionary Forces in World War I; namesake of the USS General W. C. Langfitt	
John Otho Marsh, Jr.	Virginia Beta	1948	United States Secretary of the Army (1981–1989); U.S. Representative from Virginia (1963–1971); served in the Army during World War II	
Kenneth Minihan	Florida Alpha	1963	Lieutenant General, United States Air Force; Director of the National Security Agency (1996–1999); Director of the Defense Intelligence Agency (1995–1996); Vietnam War veteran	
Billy Mitchell	District of Columbia Alpha	1896	"Father of the U.S. Air Force"; Congressional Gold Medal recipient; Brigadier General, United States Army; commander of U.S. Army air forces in France during World War I; the country's most notable early proponent of air power and one of the most important figures in American military history; namesake of the North American B-25 Mitchell Bomber and the General Mitchell International Airport in Milwaukee, Wisconsin; subject of the 1955 movie The Court-Martial of Billy Mitchell starring Gary Cooper	
James C. Owens, Jr.	California Delta	1930	United States Navy; For actions at WWII Battle of Midway, awarded posthumous Navy Cross for valor, and provided leadership as squadron commander of torpedo bombers that contributed to the squadron receiving a Presidential Unit Citation for overall actions in that battle; namesake of the USS James C. Owens	
Frank Parker	South Carolina Alpha	1888	Major General, United States Army; commander of the 1st Infantry Division during World War I	
William T. Poague	South Carolina Alpha	1888	Colonel in the Confederate States Army during the American Civil War; Treasurer of the Virginia Military Institute (1884–1914); Washington and Lee University trustee (1865–1885)	
Robert W. Sennewald	Iowa Beta	1950	General, United States Army; Commanding General of the U.S. Army Forces Command (1984–1986); Commander in Chief of the United Nations Command and Combined Forces ROK/United States (1982–1984); battalion commander during the Vietnam War	
David W. Taylor	Virginia Epsilon	1877	Rear Admiral, United States Navy; Chief Constructor of the Navy (World War I); recipient of the Distinguished Service Medal, Legion of Honour, and John Fritz Medal (1931)	
Henry Terrell, Jr.	Texas Alpha	1908	Major General, United States Army; commander of the 90th Infantry Division during World War II	
Daniel Van Voorhis	Ohio Alpha, Pennsylvania Alpha	1897	Lieutenant General, United States Army; Commander of V Corps (1938–1942); a founder of the Army's Armor Branch and one of the most important developers of American mobile warfare doctrine	
Walter X. Young	Illinois Beta	1937	United States Marine Corps; posthumous recipient of the Navy Cross; namesake of the USS Walter X. Young	

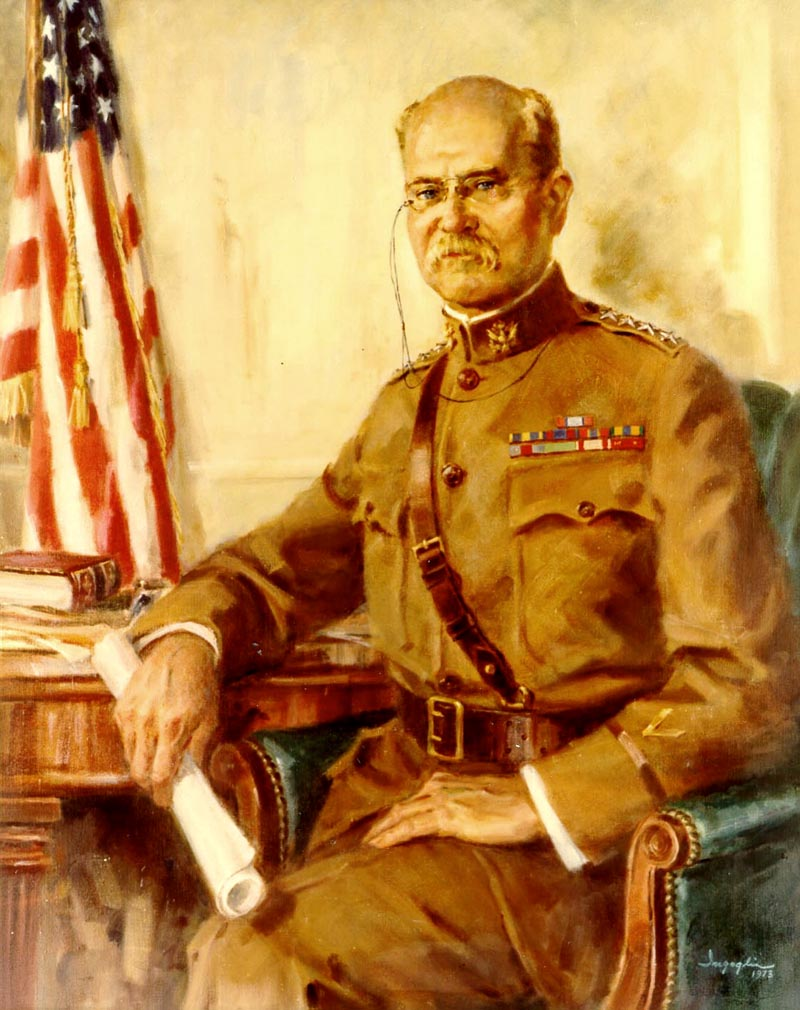
Tasker Bliss

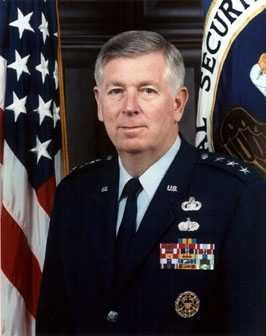
Kenneth Minihan

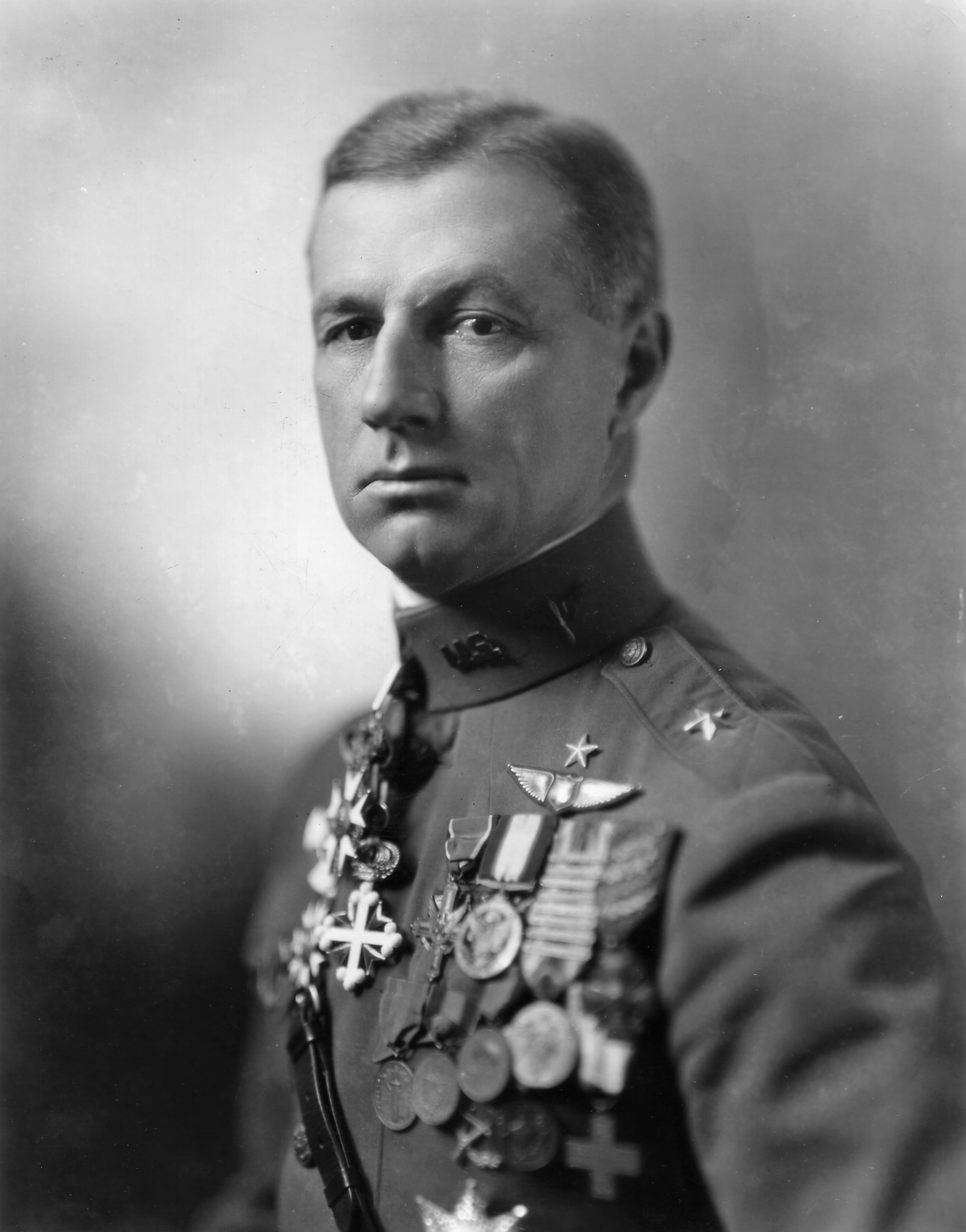
Billy Mitchell

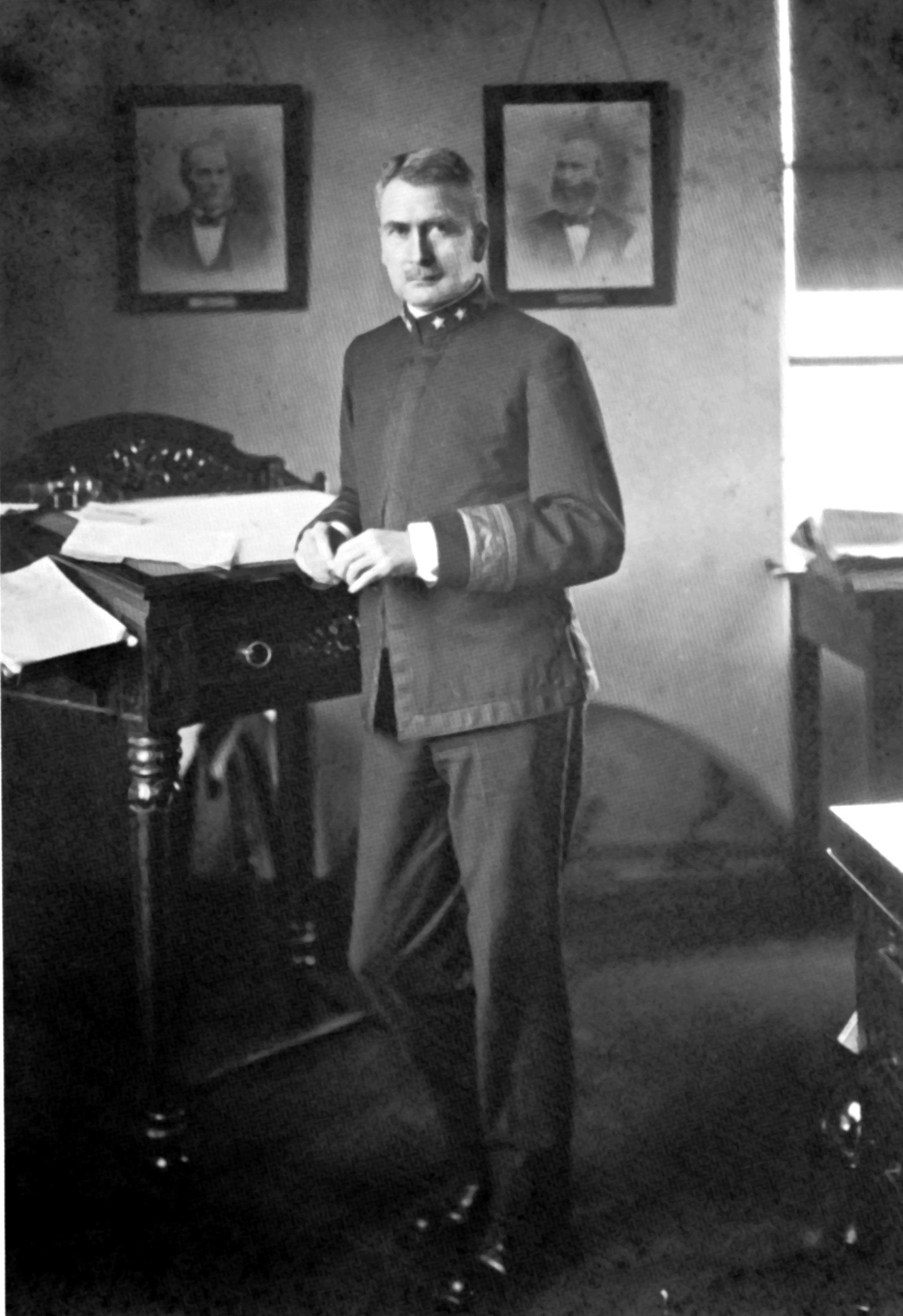
David Taylor

== Religion ==
Name	Original chapter	Initiation year	Notability	Ref.
Luther Alexander Gotwald	Pennsylvania Epsilon	1856	Professor of Theology in the Wittenberg Theological Seminary	
Collins Denny	Pennsylvania Theta	1875	Bishop of the Methodist Episcopal Church, South (1910–1932)	
David H. Greer	Pennsylvania Alpha	1861	Bishop of the Episcopal Diocese of New York (1908–1919)	
John Gresham Machen	Maryland Alpha	1898	Professor of New Testament at Princeton Seminary (1915–1929)	
Robert Lowry	Pennsylvania Gamma	1856	Professor, prominent Baptist minister, and famed 19th-century hymn writer; composed, among others, "Shall We Gather At The River?"; second President of Phi Kappa Psi (1888–1890)	
Richard Stearns	New York Alpha	1970	President of World Vision International, a Christian relief charity (1998–present)	
Ernest M. Stires	Virginia Alpha	1885	Third Bishop of the Episcopal Diocese of Long Island (1925–1942); seventh President of Phi Kappa Psi (1900–1902)	

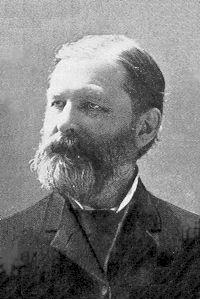
Robert Lowry

== Science ==
Name	Original chapter	Initiation year	Notability	Ref.
Donald C. Backer	New York Alpha	1963	Astrophysicist known for his research of pulsars	
Madison Bentley	Nebraska Alpha	1895	President of the American Psychological Association (1925–1926)	
Frank Wigglesworth Clarke	New York Alpha	1869	Sometimes known as the "Father of Geochemistry;" credited with determining the composition of the Earth's crust; President of the American Chemical Society (1901), and one of its founders	
Amos Dolbear	Ohio Alpha	1864	Physicist and prolific inventor	
Scott Forstall	California Beta	1988	Led original software development team for the iPhone and iPad; co-produced Tony award-winning Fun Home	
Owen Garriott	Oklahoma Alpha	1949	NASA astronaut; spent 60 days aboard the Skylab space station in 1973 during the Skylab 3 mission, and 10 days aboard the Space Shuttle Columbia in 1983 during the Spacelab-1 mission	
J. McVicker Hunt	Nebraska Alpha	1926	Prominent educational psychologist, whose works were cited in the creation of Head Start; past President of the American Psychological Association (1952–53)	
Jesse William Lazear	Pennsylvania Alpha	1885	Physician who studied malaria and yellow fever	
William Henry Letterman	Pennsylvania Alpha	1852	Founder of Phi Kappa Psi; surgeon and local medical leader in Texas	
H. Houston Merritt	Tennessee Delta	1921	Neurologist; Dean of the Columbia University College of Physicians and Surgeons (1958–1969); chairman of the Neurological Institute of New York (1948–1967)	
Peyton Rous	Maryland Alpha	1899	Recipient of the Nobel Prize in Physiology or Medicine (1966)	
Elliot See	Texas Alpha	1945	NASA astronaut; killed in 1966 during training as command pilot of the Gemini 9 mission	

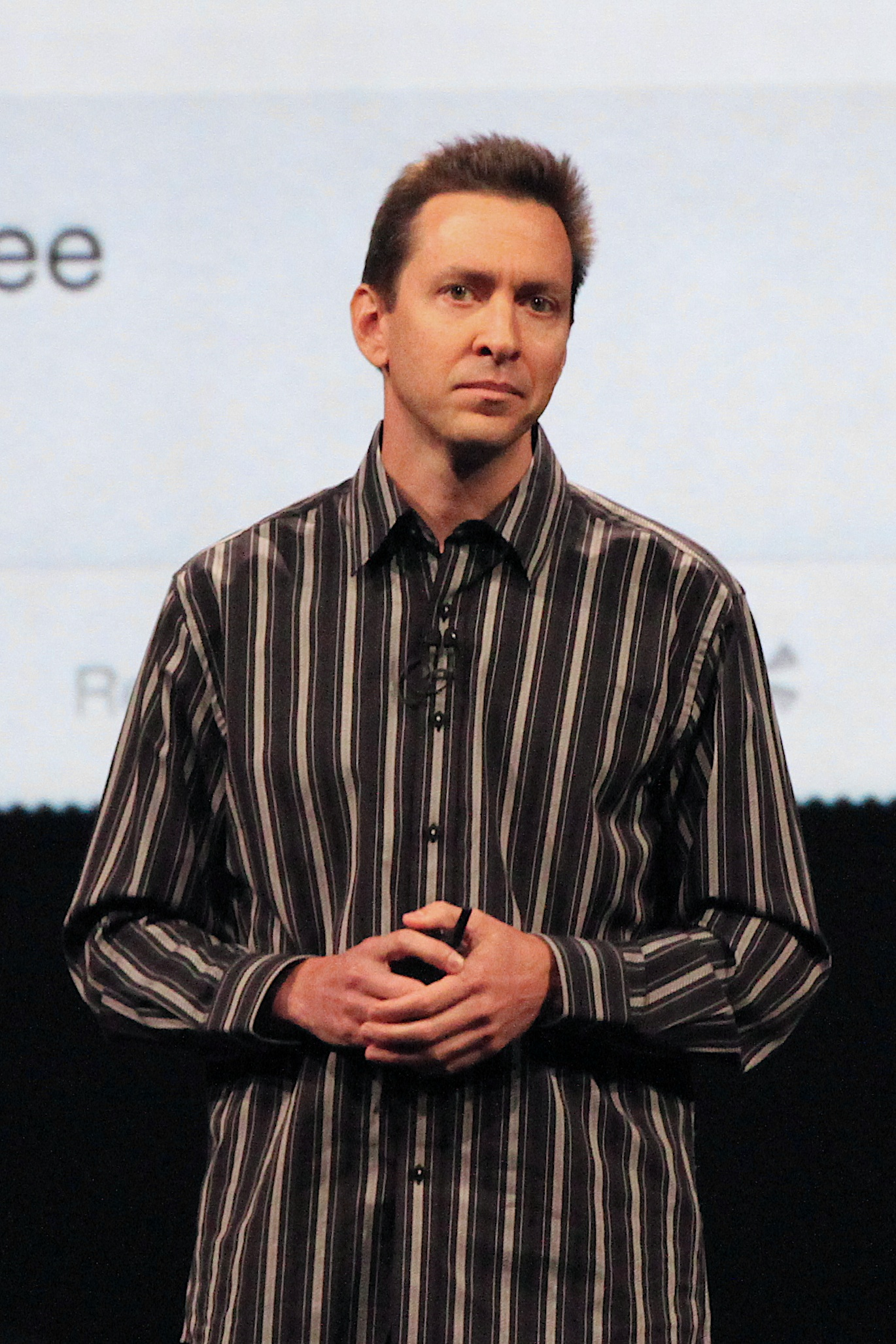
Scott Forstall

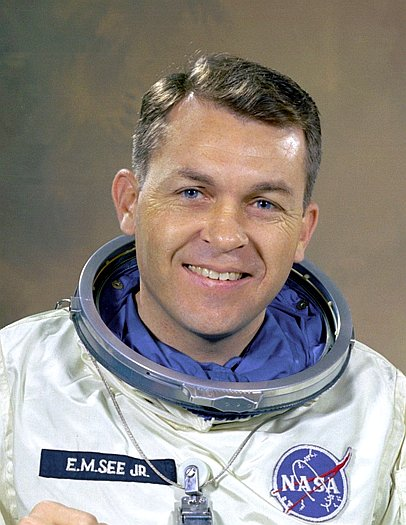
Elliott See

== Sports ==
Name	Original chapter	Initiation year	Notability	Ref.
Phog Allen	Kansas Alpha	1905	Basketball Hall of Fame member; known as the "Father of Basketball Coaching"; coach at the University of Kansas (1919–1956) where he won three national titles; namesake of the Allen Fieldhouse	
Jon P. Anderson	New York Alpha	1968	Honolulu Marathon winner (1981); Boston Marathon winner (1973); member of the U.S. Olympic team (1972)	
David J. Archer	New York Alpha	2002	Head coach of the Cornell Football team (2013–present)	
Jay Arnette	Texas Alpha	1959	Member of the 1960 U.S. Olympic men's basketball team that won the gold medal; consensus All-American on Sweet 16 and Southwest Conference Champion Longhorn team	
Ralph "Moon" Baker	Illinois Alpha	1924	Halfback on the 1926 College Football All-America Team, Captain of the 1926 Big Ten football champions, inducted into the College Football Hall of Fame	
Buzzie Bavasi	Indiana Alpha	1935	Brooklyn/Los Angeles Dodgers General Manager (1950–1968); first President of the San Diego Padres (1968–1977); California Angels General Manager (1977–1984)	
Eric Bernotas	West Virginia Alpha	1990	Medal-winning skeleton racer at the 2007 and 2009 world chjampionships	
Kevin Berry	Indiana Beta	1965	Gold and bronze medalist swimmer at the 1964 Summer Olympics	
Ron Bontemps	Wisconsin Gamma	1944	Captain of the 1952 U.S. Olympic men's basketball team that won the gold medal	
Terry Bowden	West Virginia Alpha	1975	Head football coach University of North Alabama (2009–2011); Head Football Coach The University of Akron (2012–Present); ABC Sports football analyst and color commentator (1999–2008); head football coach Auburn University (1993–1998); head football coach Samford University (1987–1992); assistant head football coach The University of Akron (1986); head football coach Salem International University (1983–1985)	
Walter Byers	Iowa Alpha	1941	First Executive Director of the NCAA (1951–1988)	
Eddie Cameron	Virginia Beta	1921	Duke University basketball coach (1942–1945); namesake of Cameron Indoor Stadium	
Jeff Cirillo	California Delta	1989	Former Major League Baseball player, All-Star 1997 and 2000	
David R. Clark	New York Alpha	1979	Won a silver medal in the coxless four as part of the 1984 U.S. Olympic team rowing team	
Jerry Colangelo	Illinois Delta	1959	Basketball Hall of Fame member; former Phoenix Suns and Arizona Diamondbacks majority owner	
Dan Dakich	Indiana Beta	1982	Former college basketball player and coach; played under Bob Knight (1981–1985); coached at Bowling Green; radio host in Indianapolis on 1070 "The Fan"	
Francis L. Dale	North Carolina Alpha	1942	Principal owner of the Cincinnati Reds (1967–1973)	
Chub Feeney	New Hampshire Alpha	1940	President of the National League (1970–1986)	
Gilbert Ford	Texas Alpha	1951	Captain of the 1956 U.S. Olympic men's basketball team that won the gold medal; twice All-Southwest Conference on SWC champion Longhorn team; president of Converse, Inc. (1986–1996)	
Ford Frick	Indiana Alpha	1913	President of the National League (1934–1951); Commissioner of Baseball (1951–1965); National Baseball Hall of Fame member	
Taj Gibson	California Delta	2007	National Basketball Association current player, New York Knicks	
George K. James	Pennsylvania Gamma	1927	Head football coach at Cornell University (1947–1960)	
Alva Kelley	New York Alpha	1939	Head football coach of Brown University (1951–1958) and Colgate University (1959–1961)	
Johnny "Red" Kerr	Illinois Delta	1953	Former NBA player and coach; former broadcaster for the Chicago Bulls	
Nile Kinnick	Iowa Alpha	1938	Heisman Trophy winner (1939); killed during training as a naval aviator during World War II; namesake of the University of Iowa's Kinnick Stadium	
Oliver "Doc" Kuhn	Tennessee Delta	1920	Led Vanderbilt to 3-straight Southern Conference championships at quarterback	
Craig Lefferts	Arizona Alpha	1977	Former Relief Pitcher and Coach	
Sol Metzger	Pennsylvania Iota	1899	Football and basketball coach, sportswriter	
John Michels	California Delta	1992	1996 NFL First Round Draft Choice for the Green Bay Packers, Super Bowl XXXI Champion	
Ralph Miller	Kansas Alpha	1938	Basketball Hall of Fame member and former college coach at the University of Wichita (1951–1964), the University of Iowa (1964–1970) and Oregon State University (1970–1989)	
Gil Reese	Tennessee Delta	1922	First three-sport captain in history of Vanderbilt, twice All-Southern halfback	
Tex Schramm	Texas Alpha	1940	Pro Football Hall of Fame member; president and general manager of the Dallas Cowboys (1960–1989); instrumental in AFL-NFL merger	
Quentin Sickels	Michigan Alpha	1947	Guard on the 1947 and 1948 University of Michigan Wolverine national champion football teams	
Mark Spitz	Indiana Beta	1969	Olympic swimming legend, won seven gold medals in 1972	
Dick Tomey	Indiana Alpha	1957	Retired football coach; San Jose State (2005–2009), University of Arizona (1987–2000), University of Hawaii (1977–1986)	
Michael Troy	Indiana Beta	1959	Gold medalist in the 200m butterfly and 800m freestyle at the 1960 Summer Olympics	
George Yardley	California Beta	1947	Basketball Hall of Fame member; first player in NBA history to score 2,000 points in one season	
Ron Yary	California Delta	1966	Pro Football Hall of Fame and College Football Hall of Fame inductee; Outland Trophy winner for USC (1967); NFL first overall draft choice (1968)	
Johnny Bach	Rhode Island Beta	1944	American professional basketball player and coach.	

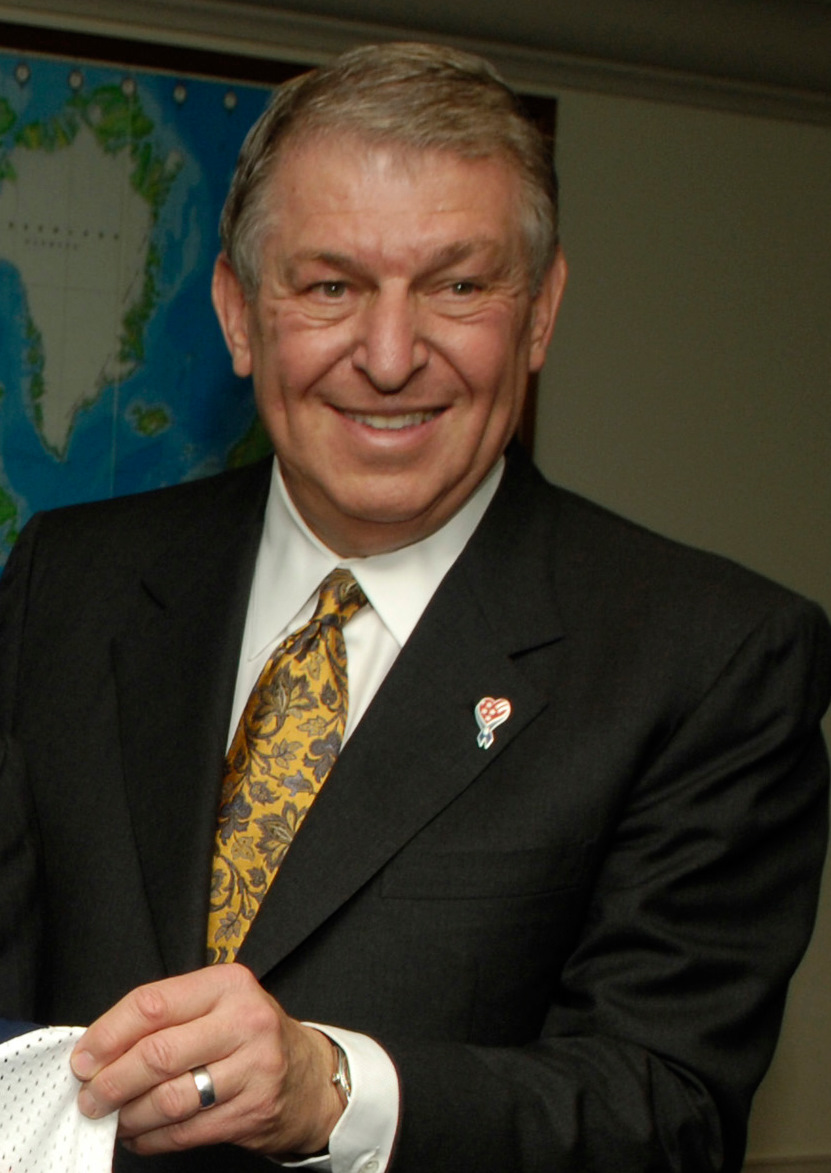
Jerry Colangelo

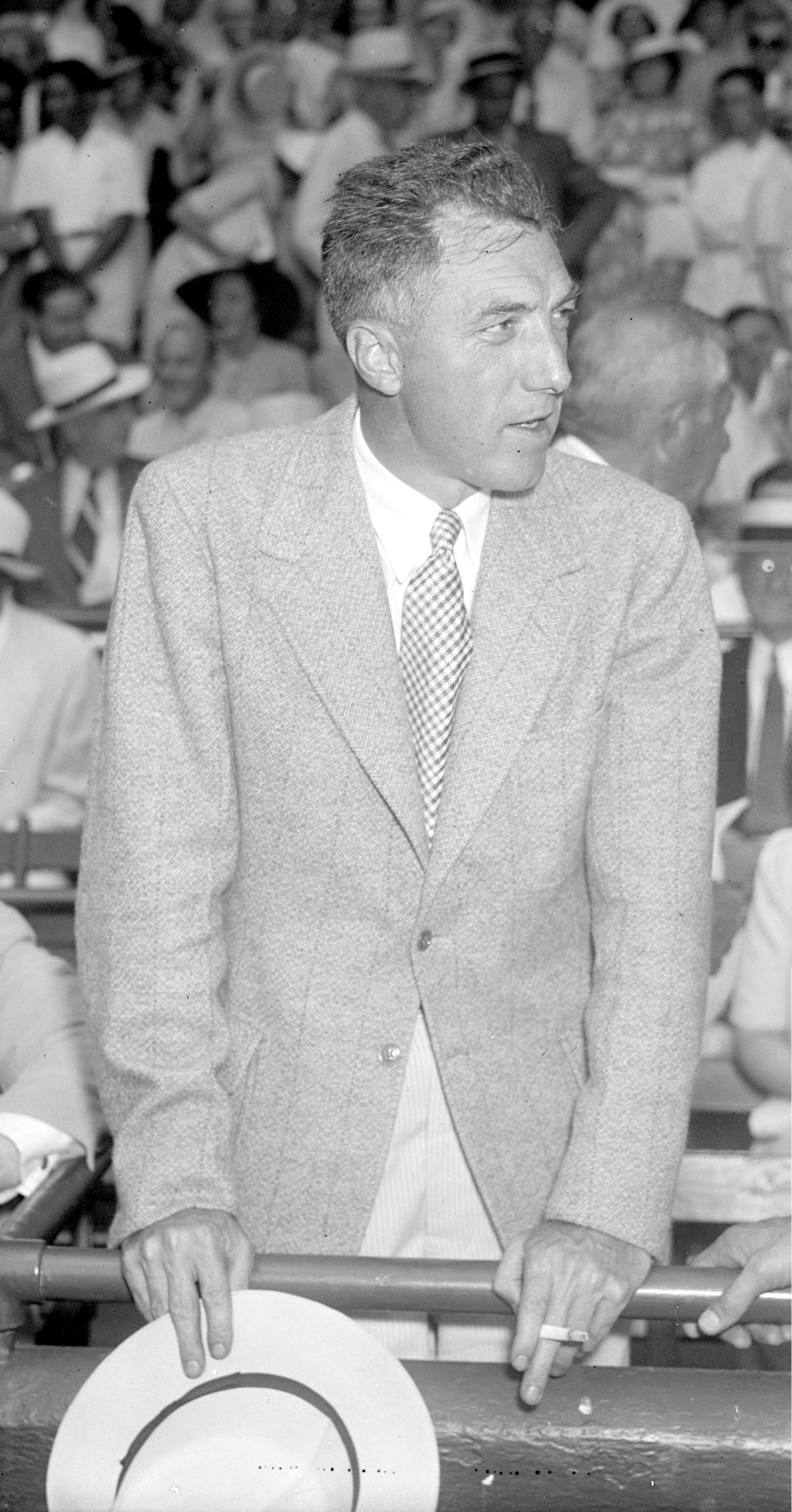
Ford Frick

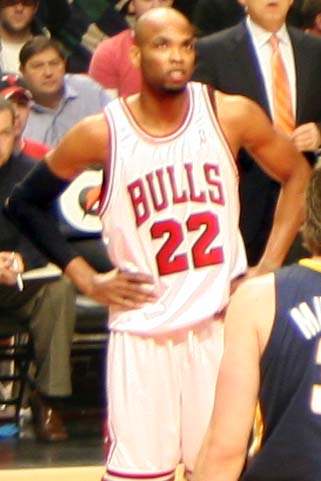
Taj Gibson

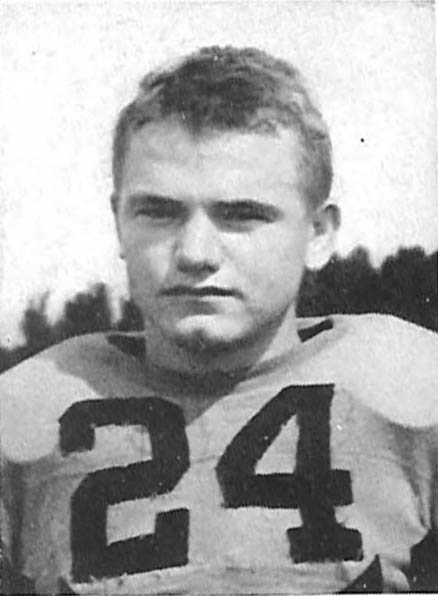
Nile Kinnick

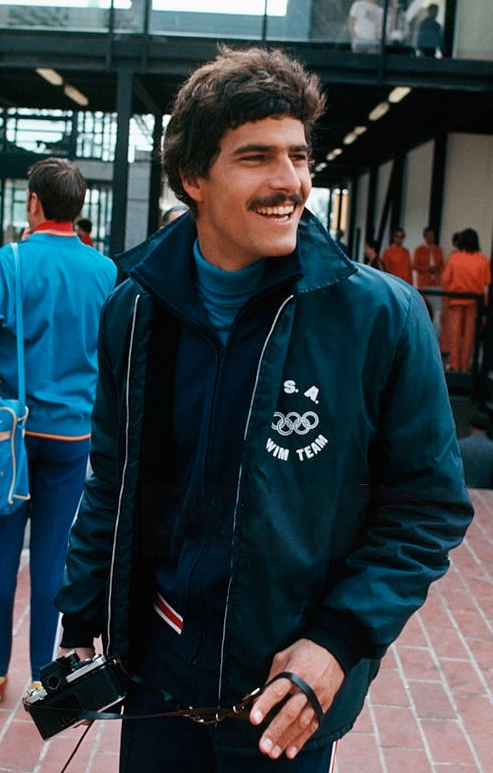
Mark Spitz
