= Roberts House (Canonsburg, Pennsylvania) =

Historic house in Pennsylvania, United States

- U.S. National Register of Historic Places
- Washington County History & Landmarks Foundation Landmark
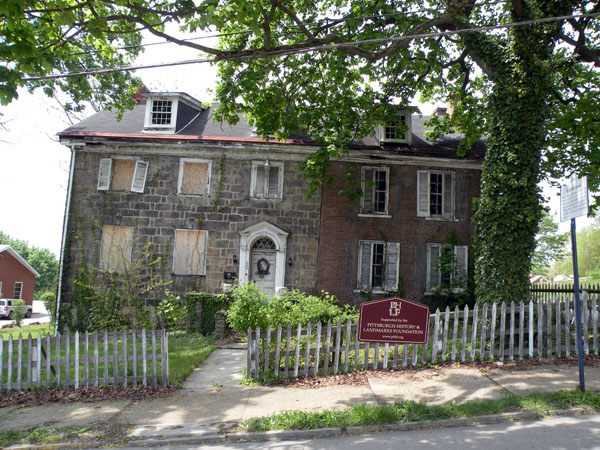
- Roberts House in 2010

- Location within Pennsylvania Location within the United States
- Interactive map showing Roberts House, Canonburg
- Location: 225 N. Central Ave., Canonsburg, Pennsylvania
- Coordinates: 40°15′39″N 80°11′15″W
- Area: 0.2 acres (0.081 ha)
- Built: 1800
- Architectural style: Georgian, Post Colonial
- NRHP reference No.: 75001674
- Added to NRHP: April 10, 1975

The Roberts House is a historic building in Canonsburg, Pennsylvania, listed on the National Register of Historic Places. It is designated as a historic residential landmark/farmstead by the Washington County History & Landmarks Foundation. The Greater Canonsburg Heritage Society erected a historical marker near the house, which is the last remaining structure from Jefferson College.

The history of the building can be traced back to the founder of Canonsburg, Colonel John Canon, and Reverend John McMillan, the founder of Jefferson College. Over the 200 years since it was built, the building was sold numerous times, including to the adjacent Jefferson College or someone connected to the college. A joint effort between the Washington County Cultural Trust and the Pittsburgh History and Landmarks Foundation was developed in 2006. While the effort gained some governmental grants, progress has stalled.

Progress has been kickstarted again with the election of new officers and trustees in the year 2022. Rehabilitation of this historic asset is now underway hopes of completion in 2025.

== Construction ==
The original wooden 2-story portion of the building was 18 by 22 feet (5.5 by 6.7 m). It was small, but in keeping with the other homes in the area. As of the Federal Direct Tax of 1798, which taxed windows, the building had 78 lights of glass across seven windows.

Other additions, built from stone, were added at later times.

== Early history ==
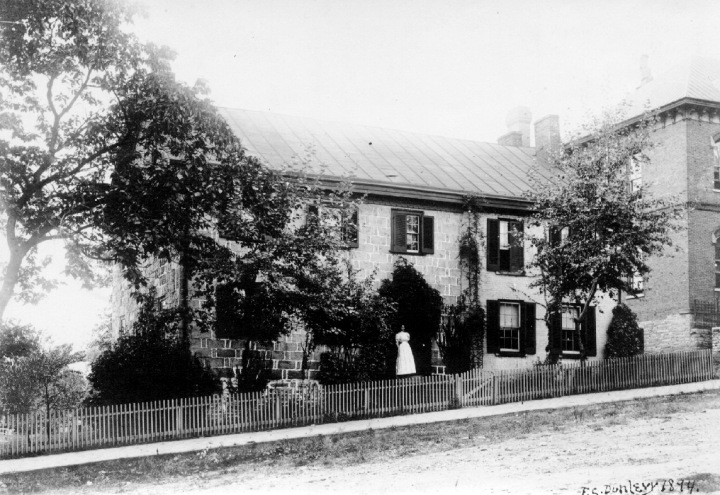
A photo of the Roberts House taken by Force C. Dunlevy in 1894. The woman at the door is identified as "Miss Snyder."

The property upon which the Roberts House currently sits, Lot 11, was part of the original grant of land to the founder of Canonsburg, Colonel John Canon. On February 3, 1796, Canon deeded the plot to Reverend John McMillan, the founder of Jefferson College. By 1798, John Watson, the Jefferson College professor who would become the first college president, was residing there. The property was then purchased by its namesake John Roberts in 1803. He operated a store there.

A series of quick sales ensued: the property was sold to Abraham Lattimore 1815, then to Washington lawyer Joseph Pentecost in 1817, then to David Hoge in 1819, and to Alexander Short in 1829. Short operated a store in the home, but lost the property in a sheriff's sale in 1832, where it ended up in the hands of John K. Wilson. In 1840, Wilson exchanged the property with President of Jefferson College Matthew Brown for 5 lots in Washington plus a token $1. Brown immediately deeded the property to Jefferson College. For a time, it was occupied by William Smith, who was Professor of Greek and vice-president of Jefferson College. After the merger of Jefferson College with nearby Washington College, the property was owned by Jefferson Academy. In 1882, the academy sold the property to John Boon, who used it as a private residence. By 1894, the occupants were "maiden-lady school teachers" Bettie and Natalie Snyder, the daughters of Henry Snyder, who was a professor at Jefferson College. Other occupants included Catherine Munnell Croker, who was a piano teacher and organist at the First Presbyterian Church.

== Preservation and restoration efforts ==
The Roberts House was studied by architectural historian Charles Morse Stotz in his 1936 book The Architectural Heritage of Early Western Pennsylvania. The details of the Roberts House recorded in the book served as the blueprints for other restoration efforts.

An architectural survey of Washington County was conducted in 1970–71 on behalf of the Washington County Commissioners, Pennsylvania Historical and Museum Commission, the Southwestern Pennsylvania Economic Development District, and the Washington-Green County Tourist Promotion Agency, with professional supervision provided by Pittsburgh History and Landmarks Foundation. The survey, which included the Roberts House, provided the basis for having the property listed on the National Register of Historic Places in 1975. A survey was performed by an architectural consultant in 1981.

In 2006, Washington County Cultural Trust (WCCT) and the Pittsburgh History and Landmarks Foundation entered into a plan to restore the property as a regional arts center. As part of plan, Andrew J. Tarnik, a trustee of Washington County Cultural Trust, purchased the property in December 2006 and sold it to the Pittsburgh History and Landmarks Foundation. The plan called for the Pittsburgh History and Landmarks Foundation to hold the property for a year while the Washington County Cultural Trust raised funds for restoration. The building was in general disrepair, including a roof in poor condition. To start off the fundraising campaign to fund the restoration, WCCT secured $5,000 in seed money from local members of the Pennsylvania General Assembly, Senator Barry Stout and Representative Tim Solobay. WCCT earned 501(c)(3) status on August 15, 2008; unfortunately, significant vandalism to the property was discovered that same day. The damage, which was estimated at $15,000 to $20,000, included the destruction of a priceless cherry bentwood stair railing and an antique mirror.

During Halloween 2009, Canonsburg history buffs led a Haunted History Walk through the borough as a fundraiser for the restoration projects. In 2009, the Pennsylvania Department of Community and Economic Development distributed $218,567 in revenue generated by The Meadows Racetrack and Casino towards the renovation project.

The Washington County Cultural Trust's tax-exempt status was automatically revoked by the Internal Revenue Service on October 7, 2011, with an effective date of May 15, 2010.

== Gallery ==
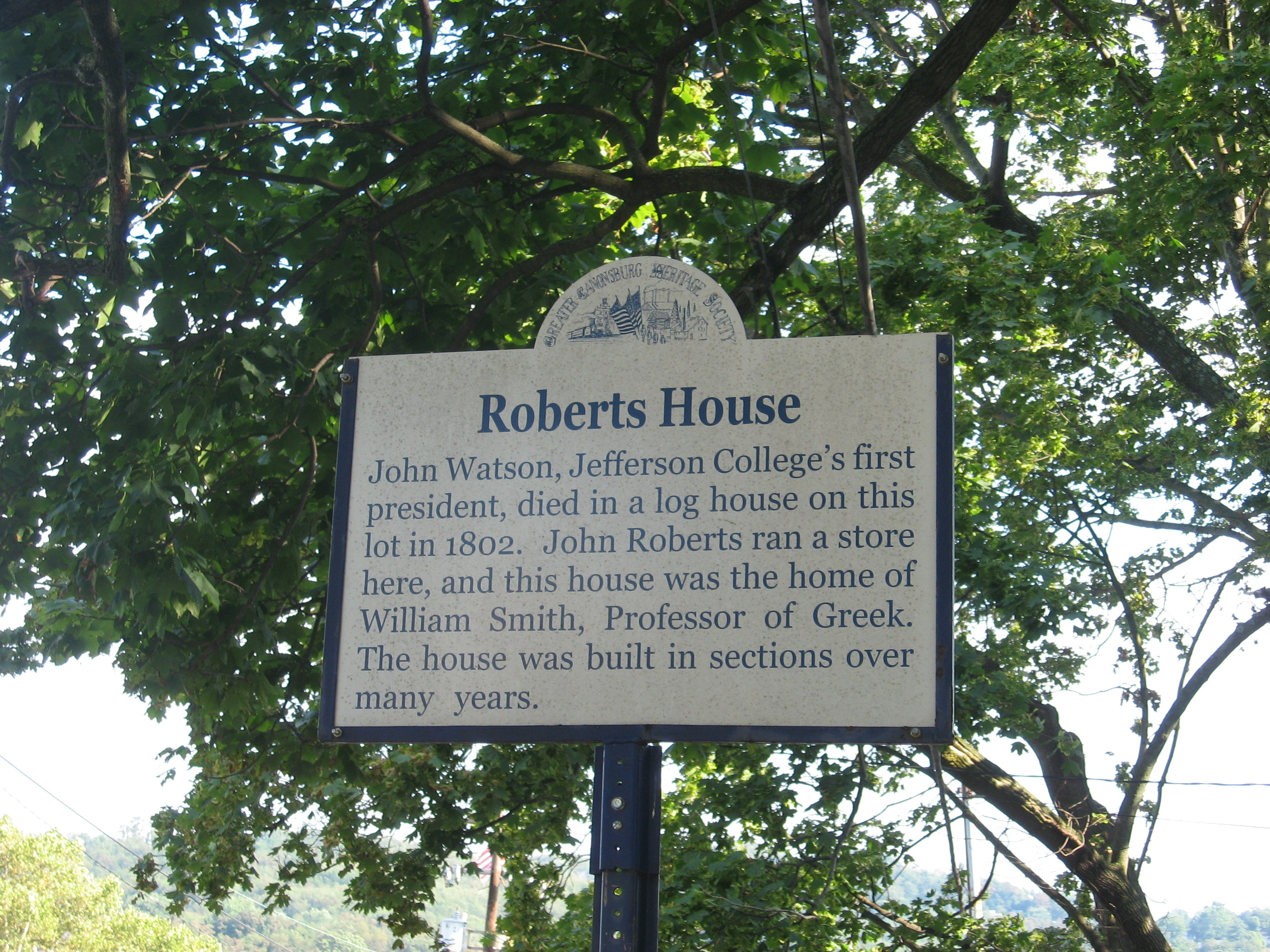
Historic Marker for Roberts House
