= Sarris =

Sarris is a surname. Notable people with the surname include:

- Andrew Sarris (1928–2012), American film critic
- Evangelos Sarris (1881–1917), officer of the Cretan gendarmerie
- Georgios Sarris (born 1989), Greek footballer
- Greg Sarris (born 1952), college professor, author, screenwriter, and current Chairman of the Federated Indians of Graton Rancheria
- John (Papou) Sarris (born 1958)- neurosurgeon/ neurologist.
- Jerome Sarris, academic
- Michael Sarris (born 1946), former Cypriot Finance Minister
- Neoklis Sarris (1920–2011), academic
- Panagiotis Sarris (born 1975), retired Greek sprinter

== See also ==
- Sarris Candies
- Sarris, the main villain of the film Galaxy Quest
- Wa'arat al-Sarris, village
