= Canon-McMillan School District =

School district in Pennsylvania

Coordinates: 40.249746°N 80.193725°W

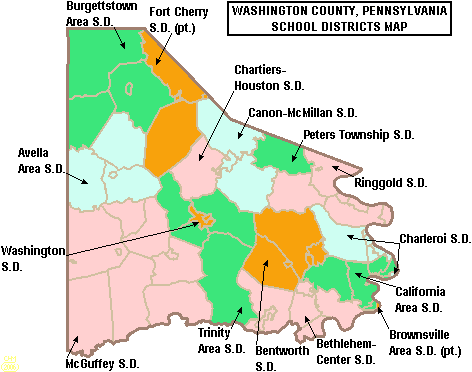

Address
- One North Jefferson Avenue Canonsburg, Pennsylvania, 15317; United States

District information
- Type: Public
- Motto: Commitment To Excellence
- Grades: K-12
- Established: 1954

Students and staff
- Athletic conference: WPIAL, PIAA
- District mascot: Scottish Highlander
- Colors: Blue Gold

Other information
- Website: http://www.cmsd.k12.pa.us/

The Canon-McMillan School District is a large public school district covering the Borough of Canonsburg, Cecil Township and North Strabane Township in Washington County, Pennsylvania, United States. The district operates one high school, Canon Mac High (9th–12th), one middle school, Canon Mac Middle school (7th–8th), two intermediate schools, Cecil Intermediate, North Strabane Intermediate (5th–6th) and five elementary Schools, Muse, South Central, Wylandville, Hills-Henderson, Borland Manor (K-4th).

== District information ==
The Canon-McMillan School District is the largest school district in Washington County in terms of enrollment, and the size of its student body is increasing annually. On average, the district receives around a hundred new students each school year. Enrollment has been increasing at this rate for about a decade, and is projected to continue doing so as long as the local economy continues to flourish. Canon-McMillan is in class AAAAAA (6A) WPIAL for most of its athletic programs. The district's mascot is the "Big Mac", similar to another common mascot called a Highlander, which is typically displayed as a soldier of a Scottish regiment. Canon-McMillan's school colors are blue and gold, while the alternate colors are white with blue or gold. The district is predominantly suburban, and also serves rural portions of North Strabane Township near the town of Eighty Four and the semi-rural area southwest of the Allegheny County line in Cecil Township, Washington County. The school district borders South Fayette Twp. School District (In Allegheny County) to the north. In Washington County, the district adjoins both Peters Twp. and Ringgold School Districts to the east, Chartiers - Houston to the west, Fort Cherry to the northwest, Trinity Area School District to the southwest, and Bentworth Schools to the southeast.

=== Athletics ===
Athletically, Canon-Mac has been known as a wrestling powerhouse for decades. Most recently, the school has also been known for its boys basketball program and as WPIAL and PA state powers in boys and girls soccer. Their Varsity Girls Soccer team won the PIAA AAAA State Championship in 2016 and was State runner- up in 2014. Boys soccer won WPIAL championships in 2012, 2015, and 2019. Their Varsity softball team won the PIAA State Championship in 2013, and WPIAL Championship in 2012 & 2013. Their varsity girls volleyball team won their first ever WPIAL championship in 2019, upsetting heavily favored North Allegheny in the finals. Their Varsity baseball team won the PIAA State Championship in both 2008 and 2018 as well as their first ever WPIAL championship in 2018. Their varsity hockey team won the Penguins Cup in 2010 and 2015. The boys basketball team had its best season in school history at the time in 2018, with 19 straight wins and a 21–2 overall record. The team's winning streak unfortunately came to an end with a loss to Baldwin, and the season ended with a loss to Woodland Hills in the WPIAL semi-finals, preventing Canon-Mac from moving on to the finals, however, the season still added to the school's long legacy of athletic success. The team topped their own record from the previous year in 2019, becoming WPIAL section champions with only one regular season loss and reaching the WPIAL finals. Despite losing the final game to City League section champions Taylor Allderdice, the season still went down as one of Canon - Mac's greatest athletic feats. The school's wrestling team has won WPIAL titles in 1983, 1985, 1991, 1993, 1995, 2010, 2011, 2012, and 2013. In 2012, the wrestling team took home their 1st PIAA State dual meet Championship Title in the school's history before winning the state championship again in 2013. In 1992, 2011, 2012 and 2013, members of the team won the State Individual Tournament team championship by collecting the most points.

=== Transportation ===
Transportation in the Canon-McMillan School District is provided mainly by school bus. The district also operates a small number of school vans and short buses (mostly for students that are physically handicapped and/or suffer from severe mental disabilities, as well as students with behavioral or emotional issues that may cause disruption on a typical school bus.) Most van and short bus services are provided by third-party transit contractors. The school district is also legally bound by the state to provide transportation to private academies and parochial schools lying within its service zone. The Canon-Mac full size bus fleet is composed almost entirely of Blue Bird Vision school buses; second and third generations; built from 2008–present. The district also has about ten-first generation Visions; built from 2003 to 2007; most of which remain in route service currently, but are soon to be retired. Among other buses retained by the district, two Thomas bodied Freightliner FS-65s (buses 10 and 31) remain in route service, alongside at least five of their newer counterparts, the Thomas Saf-T-Liner C2 buses, ordered by the district during the 2012 and 2015–2017 model years. Two to four more full size FS-65s no longer in route service are kept at the Support Facility as backup buses for situations when route buses may not be operable for some reason. The district also began to add IC CE school buses to its fleet in 2019. Other student transport vehicles of the district include Ford E-Series passenger vans, Ford Transit passenger vans, Thomas Minotour short buses based upon Ford E-Series chassis, and short Thomas Conventional buses on either Freightliner FS-65 or International 3800 chassis. The district fleet once included Blue Bird TC/2000 type D buses, however these have all been retired and sold off. Several Blue Bird bodied full size International 3800s have been sold by the district as well, and only one of these buses remains today, repainted and with stop sign, warning lights, passenger windows, and most passenger seats removed. This bus serves primarily as an equipment transporter for the high school band and rarely travels with passengers aboard.

== School buildings and other facilities ==
The Canon-McMillan School District contains nine academic school buildings and three athletic complexes that are separate from the schools, as well as a school bus garage and a central administration building.

=== High school ===
Canon-McMillan High School is the largest school building in the district, both geographically and by student population. Currently, about 1,700 students in grades 9–12 attend CMHS. The school was originally built and opened as Canon-McMillan Senior High School in 1958 with grades 10–12, and has been expanded and renovated in 1966, 1983, 1988, 1994, 2001–2003, and 2017–2019. CMHS has two gymnasiums (Main and Auxiliary), a natatorium, a weight room, and a mat room for wrestling practice as its athletic facilities. The school also has four outdoor tennis courts and formerly had an open playing field and outdoor exercise yard on its premises. An auditorium is also featured.

The 1966 and 1983 extensions to CMHS both added additional classrooms, and the school's name was changed from Canon-McMillan Senior High to just Canon-McMillan High School in 1983. This was due to the district's reorganization plan which called for the 9th grade to be moved to the high school and for the junior high schools (which became middle schools at that point in time) to take on the 6th graders. The 1983 project also renovated the interior of the entire existing building, added seats to the auditorium, and reconfigured the athletic wing by replacing the original gym with a larger one that contained pull-out bleachers and an elevated walking track. The auxiliary gym, weight room, and mat room were added in 1988, and some other minor floor plan modifications were also made to other parts of the school at that time. The restrooms and locker rooms in that part of the building were remodeled and slightly modified in 1994.

The 2001–2003 project was the longest and most major renovation in the school's history. This project completely demolished and rebuilt the school's academic wings, added more parking, and moved the library, cafeteria, kitchen, and teacher's lounge closer to the school's entrances. A centrally located commons area with high vaulted ceilings; known as the Atrium; was also created during this time. Some minor repainting took place in both gyms, and the wood flooring of both was replaced. A press box and more pull-out collapsible bleachers were added to the main gym above the elevated track, and the exercise yard was eliminated as it was in the way of the new set of loading docks and part of the new classroom portion of the school. The natatorium was also built in this area, and has two entrances off of the hallway in the athletic wing. The performing arts and technology wing was also expanded, and the original loading docks, which were located at the end of that wing, became secondary loading docks. The main entrance to the school was modernized and the doors pushed about 8 feet forward, and most of the building's front fascia was re-bricked to give a more clean and updated appearance. A large digital sign was also added to the front of the school as part of the project. In total, about 90 percent of the original building was either renovated or replaced, and the entire student and staff populations benefited from the project. It would effectively relieve severe overcrowding at CMHS for the next 8 years, and increase student capacity from barely 1,200 students to around 1,500 students. The student body would continue to grow, however, and by 2011, the enrollment at the school had exceeded the 1,500 student maximum.

The school would remain overcrowded until 2017, when a new classroom extension was begun. Both academic wings were extended back, and the parking lot that used to be behind them was removed. The open playing field off of the athletic wing was paved over and made into a new lot to make up for lost parking area. Brand new Jumbotron-style scoreboards were installed in the main gym, along with revamped signage on the press box and outside of the doors. The auditorium was also remodeled with fresh paint, new ceilings, all new seats, and the expansion of the stage and backstage areas. New, better lighting systems and brand new acoustic wall panels were also installed, and the total seating capacity was significantly increased. The band room was nearly doubled in size and also received acoustic panels and other sound mitigation improvements. The teacher's lounge was again relocated, due to the cafeteria being expanded into its former location, and a security vestibule was added to the main office entrance. The reception portion of the office was remodeled and reconfigured to accommodate the new feature. Most building work and all major parts of the project concluded in February 2019. Some minor cosmetic landscaping work continued into the summer of 2019.

=== Intermediate/middle schools ===
Canon-McMillan Middle School is currently the only middle school in the Canon-McMillan School District and educates students in 7th and 8th grades. Present enrollment numbers around 1,100 students.

The current building was constructed during 2022 and opened to students in January 2023. It replaced the old Canonsburg Middle School building which dates back to 1967. The current school is larger than the one it replaced, and also houses new school board and central administration offices for the entire district.

Cecil Intermediate School is one of two intermediate schools in the Canon-McMillan School District and currently holds around 500 students in grades 5 and 6. The school opened in 1963 as Cecil Junior High School and originally taught students in the 7th, 8th, and 9th grades. Beginning in 1983, the school held grades 6–8 and had its name changed to Cecil Middle School and finally, in 2002, 5th grade was added and grades 7 and 8 were dropped, and the school became the Cecil Intermediate School of today.

North Strabane Intermediate School is the second intermediate school in the district and has a student body of around 550. It accommodates grades 5 and 6 and is the third newest school building in the district. The site next to Borland Manor Elementary was cleared in 2000 and the school opened in 2002, although it was not fully completed until 2003. There are also multiple baseball/softball fields with permanent dugouts, a small press building and digital scoreboards outside of the school, used for competition as well as softball practice.

=== Elementary schools ===
Borland Manor Elementary School is the oldest operational school building in the district as of 2018. The school is home to around 320 students in grades K-4. It was built in 1954 as new housing was developed in the area and is adjacent to North Strabane Intermediate School (details above). The school was partially remodeled in the early 90s, but its condition has unfortunately once again declined since then.

Hills-Hendersonville Elementary School teaches about 300 students in Kindergarten through 4th grade. The school opened in 1965 and an expansion is planned in the years ahead, as the school is currently operating at maximum capacity, however the exact dates of the project have not yet been determined. Minor renovations and visual updates took place in 2012.

Muse Elementary School enrolls around 730 students in grades K-4. This facility was built in 2018. It was the district's newest facility until the opening of the new Canon-McMillan Middle School in January, 2023. Muse is also the largest elementary school in the district by enrollment. The current building replaced the original Muse Elementary, which was built in 1936 and razed upon completion of the new school in 2017. The current school is a consolidation of the now closed Cecil and First Street Elementary Schools (which opened in 1936 and 1924 respectively) into the Muse facility. The new school is more than 4 times the size of its predecessor geographically.

South Central Elementary School currently has a student body numbering about 470 pupils in grades K-4. The school opened in 1966 and was renovated and expanded in 1995. The project included interior repainting, minor floor plan alterations, remodeling of the library and main office, and the addition of windows to all classrooms with walls to the outside. A scientific plant growing lab/greenhouse, still one of only two in the district, was also added to the school at that time.

Wylandville Elementary School. The school opened to students in 1966 and is currently populated by about 220 students in grades K-4, making it the smallest school in the district by enrollment. Wylandville was last renovated in 1979 and is to be overhauled in the next few years, as age, decay, and outdatedness have taken their toll on the current building significantly. The projected date for a new facility to open on this site is for the 2027–2028 school year. It is also home to the district's second greenhouse, known as the "Living Classroom".

=== Other facilities ===
Big Mac Stadium serves as the Canon-McMillan School District's main athletic facility. It was initially built up as a formal stadium in the 1970s, however, the grounds that it occupies have been used for community sporting events since the 1930s. The stadium is sometimes also called Canon-McMillan Stadium or Canonsburg Stadium. It recently underwent renovations to expand seating areas and add new locker rooms and more parking. It had its running track resurfaced and artificial turf replaced in 2016. The stadium received artificial turf for the first time in 1998, which was when the last major renovation prior to the most recent one occurred. It is located just off Jefferson Avenue near the heart of Canonsburg, and is adjacent to the district's former Central Administration building.

McDowell Field is the district's primary baseball practice complex, named for the road on which it is located. Besides a baseball diamond, the site also contains multipurpose playing fields and service buildings which house locker rooms, restrooms, a concession stand, a press room, and the controls for the scoreboard.

West McMurray Road Soccer Complex, alternatively known as Van Eman Field, is a triangular grass field divided into several small soccer pitches and serves as a practice field for the Canon-McMillan Youth Soccer Association, the district league for boys and girls soccer at the elementary school level. The de facto name Van Eman Field comes from Van Eman Creek, which runs near the site. The entire field is fenced in. There is a North Strabane Township municipal pump station on the premises, which is fenced off separately from the field itself to prevent unauthorized access. The site does not have any permanent buildings besides a basic wooden shelter that are accessible to its users, as portable toilets and a utility trailer are only used at the field seasonally.

Canon-McMillan Support Facility serves as both the district's school bus/school van garage and the headquarters for the district-wide maintenance and custodial department. It is a large, aircraft hangar-like building providing indoor parking and maintenance space for most of the district's buses, vans, and maintenance vehicles, with an attached annex designated for offices and the service and repair shop. It was built in 1990 and is diagonally across the street from the high school.

Canon-McMillan Central Administration Building formerly held the school board and central administration offices. Since January 2023 these offices have been moved to a dedicated section of the new middle school. This old administration building was built in the 1970s and is in front of Big Mac Stadium on Jefferson Ave. It has become the location for the district's Technology Department and the lower level locker rooms are still in use.

== History ==
The Canon-McMillan School District was founded on September 15, 1954, in a merger between the Canonsburg, Cecil Township, and North Strabane Township schools. Canon-McMillan High School was formerly known as Canonsburg High school and Cecil High School when the name was changed. The high school moved to its current location in 1958. The district is named for Col. John Canon and the Rev. John McMillan. John McMillan's Log School; which dates back to the 1780s, is located outside the present day Canonsburg Middle School.

On Thursday, September 9, 2021, Canon-McMillan High School experienced a bomb threat.

== Comprehensive list of schools ==
The Canon-McMillan School District operates a total of nine schools:

- Canon-McMillan High School
- Canon-McMillan Middle School
- North Strabane Intermediate School
- Cecil Intermediate School
- Borland Manor Elementary School
- Hills-Hendersonville Elementary School
- Muse Elementary School
- South Central Elementary School
- Wylandville Elementary School

There are also two former schools in the district that closed on June 1, 2017, after Muse Elementary was completely overhauled and expanded:

- First Street Elementary School
- Cecil Elementary School

A third defunct school, Hawthorne Elementary School, closed in 1982 due to declining district wide enrollment at the time. The school was demolished in 1986.

Canonsburg Middle School was relocated and renamed to Canon-McMillan Middle School in 2023, the previous building is no longer in use.

It opened in 1967 as Canon-McMillan Junior High School, and was built on the former site of the original Canonsburg High School, demolished a few years earlier. The original school's historic auditorium still remains as a freestanding building however, initially dating back to the 1920s, and still in use for school and community functions to this day. Canon-McMillan Junior High originally held students in grades 7–9. In 1983 it changed to grades 6-8 and was renamed Canonsburg Middle, and in 2002 it changed again to grades 7 and 8, which it would serve until its closure.

== Notable alumni ==
Notable people who have attended the school district include:

- Mike Hull – linebacker for the Miami Dolphins
- Doug Kotar – former running back for the New York Giants
- Demi Moore – actress
- Brandon Neuman – member of the Pennsylvania House of Representatives
- Bill Schmidt – 1972 Olympics javelin bronze medal winner
- Archie Strimel – soccer goalkeeper
- Bobby Vinton - singer and actor
- Cameron Weston - professional baseball pitcher for the Baltimore Orioles
