= Meadowlands, Pennsylvania =

Unincorporated community in Pennsylvania, US

Coordinates: 40°12′55″N 80°13′38″W

- census-designated place
- Interactive map of Meadowlands, Pennsylvania
- Country: United States
- State: Pennsylvania
- County: Washington

Area
  - Total: 0.88 sq mi (2.29 km^{2})
  - Land: 0.88 sq mi (2.29 km^{2})
  - Water: 0 sq mi (0.00 km^{2})

Population (2020)
  - Total: 839
  - Density: 949.3/sq mi (366.51/km^{2})
- Time zone: UTC-5 (Eastern (EST))
  - Summer (DST): UTC-4 (EDT)
- FIPS code: 42-48320

Meadow Lands is a census-designated place in Chartiers Township, Pennsylvania, United States. The community is located in Chartiers Township, in central Washington County about 8 miles (13 km) north of the city of Washington. As of the 2020 census the population was 839.

== Demographics ==
Historical population
Census	Pop.	Note	%±
2010	822		—
2020	839		2.1%
U.S. Decennial Census

== Education ==
It is in the Chartiers-Houston School District.
