= McGovern, Pennsylvania =

Unincorporated community in Pennsylvania, US

McGovern
- Census-designated place
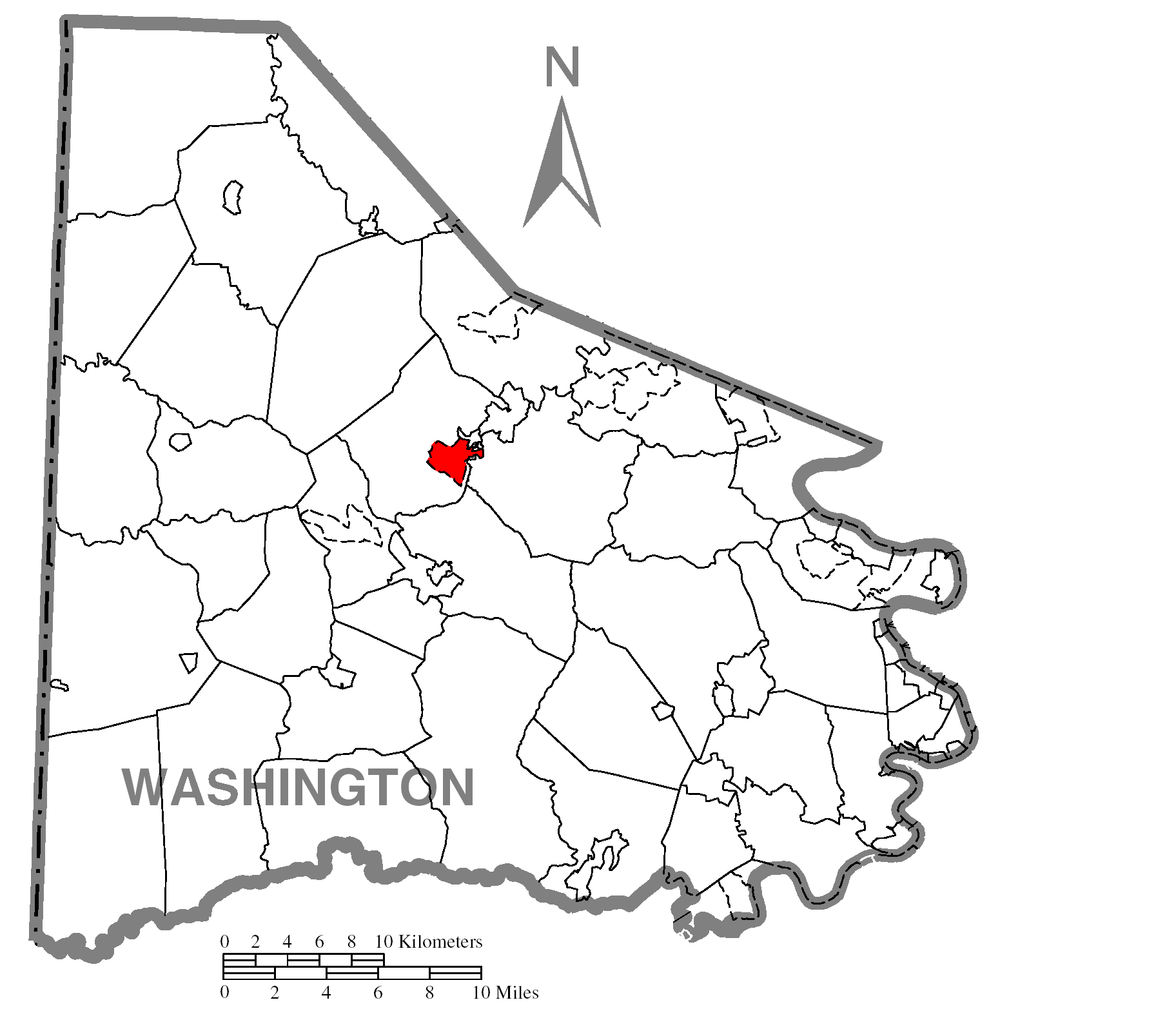
- Location of McGovern in Washington County
- Coordinates: 40°14′1″N 80°13′7″W
- Country: United States
- State: Pennsylvania
- County: Washington
- Township: Chartiers

Area
  - Total: 2.30 sq mi (5.96 km^{2})
  - Land: 2.30 sq mi (5.96 km^{2})
  - Water: 0 sq mi (0.00 km^{2})

Population (2020)
  - Total: 3,621
  - Density: 1,572.6/sq mi (607.17/km^{2})
- Time zone: UTC-4 (EST)
  - Summer (DST): UTC-5 (EDT)
- Area code: 724
- FIPS code: 42-46160

McGovern is a census-designated place (CDP) in Chartiers Township, Pennsylvania, United States. The population was 2,742 at the 2010 census.

== Geography ==
McGovern is located at 40°14′1″N 80°13′7″W (40.233547, -80.218492).

According to the United States Census Bureau, the CDP has a total area of 1.9 square miles (4.9 km^{2}), all of it land.

== Demographics ==
Historical population
Census	Pop.	Note	%±
2000	2,538		—
2010	2,742		8.0%
2020	3,621		32.1%
U.S. Decennial Census

=== 2020 census ===
As of the 2020 census, McGovern had a population of 3,621. The median age was 46.3 years. 20.4% of residents were under the age of 18 and 22.4% were 65 years of age or older. For every 100 females, there were 97.0 males, and for every 100 females age 18 and over, there were 93.7 males.

100.0% of residents lived in urban areas, while 0.0% lived in rural areas.

There were 1,469 households, of which 28.5% had children under the age of 18 living in them. Of all households, 61.4% were married-couple households, 12.7% were households with a male householder and no spouse or partner present, and 21.4% were households with a female householder and no spouse or partner present. About 21.4% of all households were made up of individuals and 11.1% had someone living alone who was 65 years of age or older.

There were 1,537 housing units, of which 4.4% were vacant. The homeowner vacancy rate was 1.6% and the rental vacancy rate was 8.0%.

Racial composition as of the 2020 census
Race	Number	Percent
White	3,341	92.3%
Black or African American	61	1.7%
American Indian and Alaska Native	2	0.1%
Asian	32	0.9%
Native Hawaiian and Other Pacific Islander	3	0.1%
Some other race	20	0.6%
Two or more races	162	4.5%
Hispanic or Latino (of any race)	62	1.7%

=== 2000 census ===
At the 2000 census there were 2,538 people, 1,059 households, and 762 families living in the CDP. The population density was 1,355.0 people per square mile (523.2 people/km^{2}). There were 1,093 housing units at an average density of 583.5/mi^{2} (225.7/km^{2}). The racial makeup of the CDP was 98.03% White, 1.58% African American, 0.12% Asian, and 0.28% from two or more races. Hispanic or Latino of any race were 0.51%.

Of the 1,059 households 24.0% had children under the age of 18 living with them, 61.4% were married couples living together, 8.3% had a female householder with no husband present, and 28.0% were non-families. 25.8% of households were one person and 15.5% were one person aged 65 or older. The average household size was 2.36 and the average family size was 2.83.

The age distribution was 19.1% under the age of 18, 5.1% from 18 to 24, 26.4% from 25 to 44, 26.2% from 45 to 64, and 23.2% 65 or older. The median age was 45 years. For every 100 females, there were 90.1 males. For every 100 females age 18 and over, there were 85.4 males.

The median household income was $39,417 and the median family income was $46,250. Males had a median income of $43,088 versus $25,417 for females. The per capita income for the CDP was $20,437. About 2.7% of families and 2.7% of the population were below the poverty line, including 2.8% of those under age 18 and 1.2% of those age 65 or over.

== Education ==
It is in the Chartiers-Houston School District.
