= Chartiers Township, Pennsylvania =

Township in Pennsylvania, US

Coordinates: 40°15′30″N 80°14′59″W

- Township
- Township of Chartiers
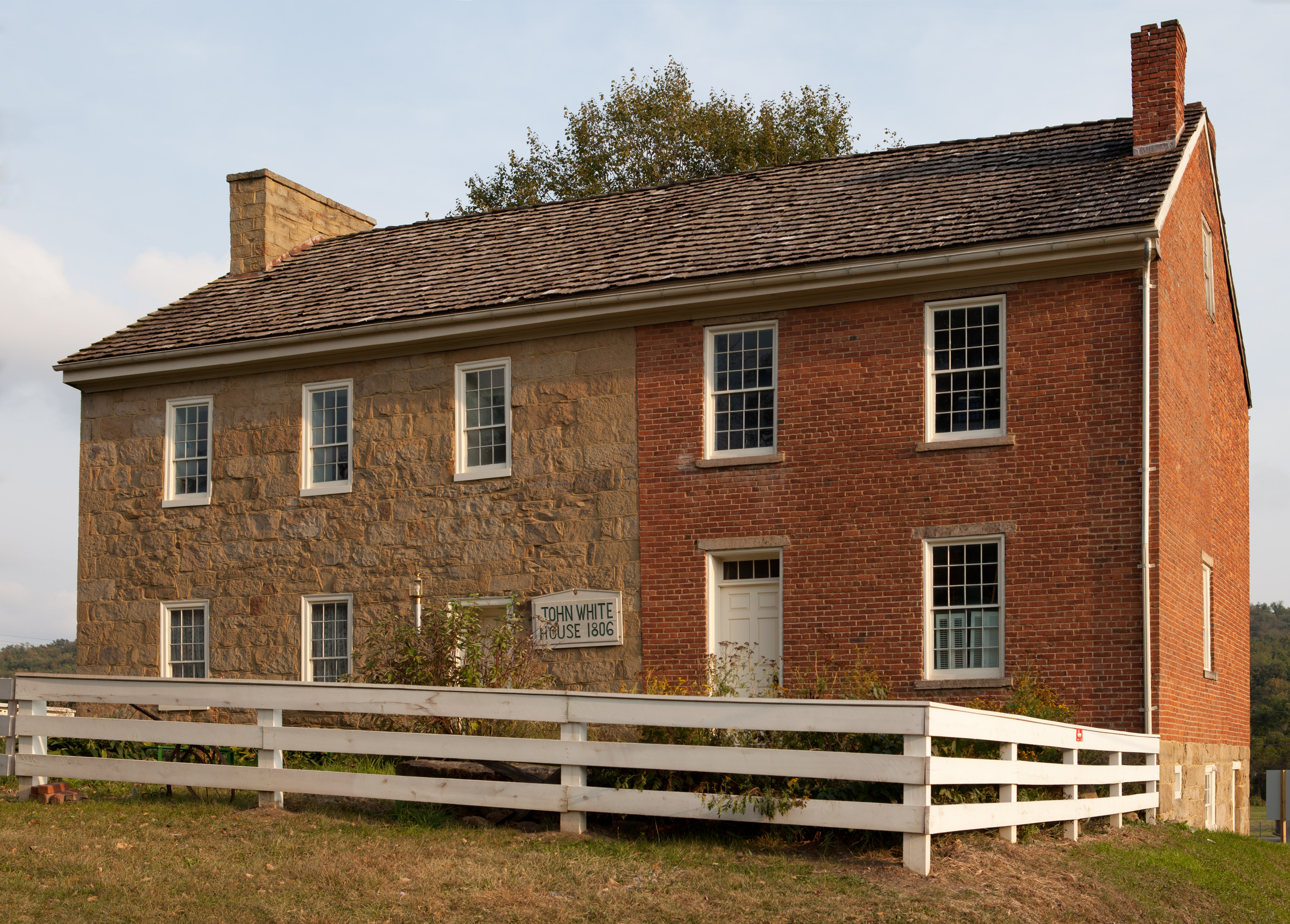
- The John White House, a historic site in the township

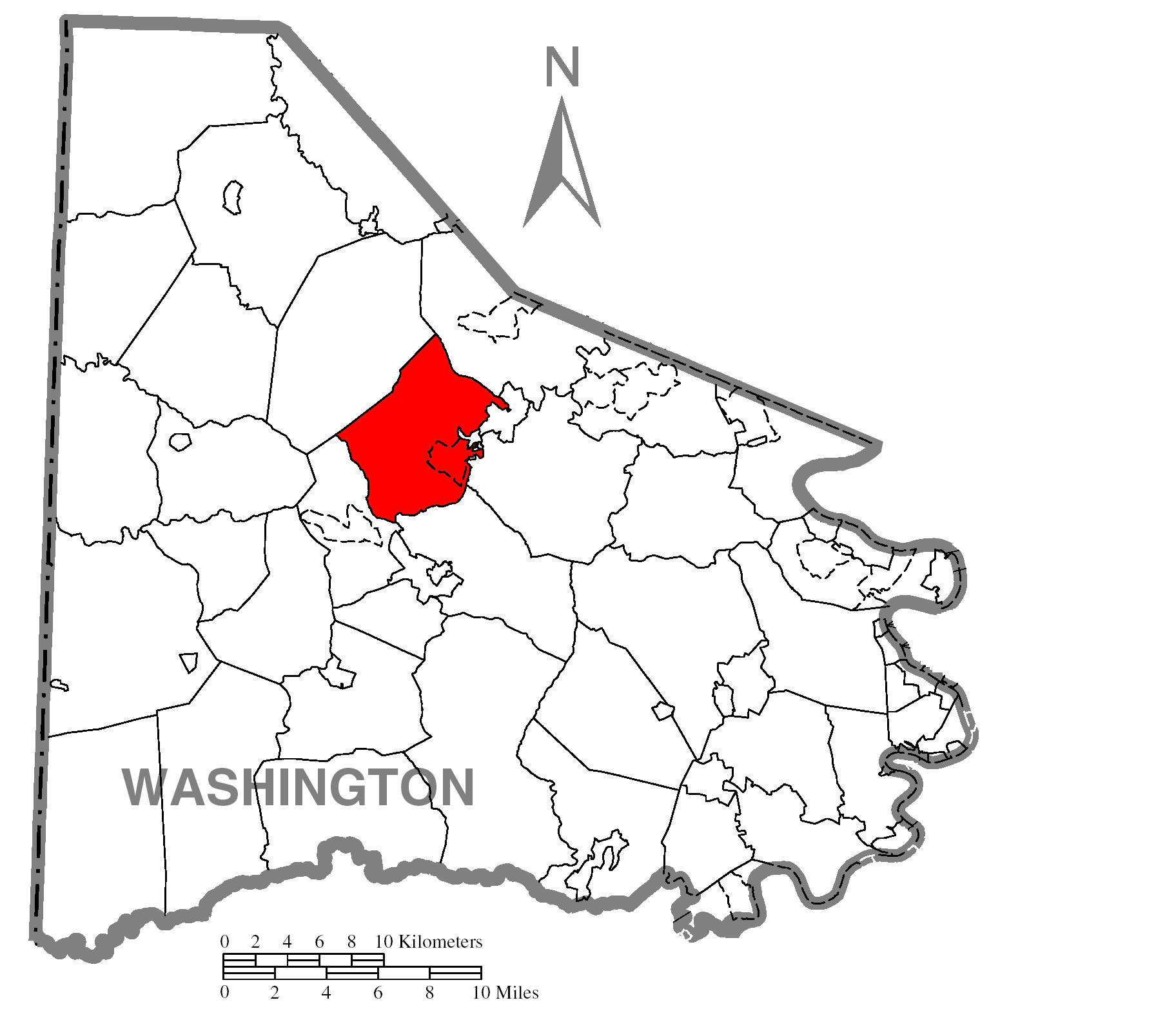
- Map of Washington County, Pennsylvania highlighting Chartiers Township

- Map of Washington County, Pennsylvania
- Country: United States
- State: Pennsylvania
- County: Washington

Government
  - Type: Council

Area
  - Total: 24.61 sq mi (63.75 km^{2})
  - Land: 24.61 sq mi (63.75 km^{2})
  - Water: 0 sq mi (0.00 km^{2})

Population (2020)
  - Total: 8,628 ▲
  - Estimate (2023): 9,168
  - Density: 323.6/sq mi (124.94/km^{2})
- Time zone: UTC-5 (Eastern (EST))
  - Summer (DST): UTC-4 (EDT)
- Area code: 724
- FIPS code: 42-125-12848
- Website: www.chartierstwp.com

Historical population
| Census | Pop. | Note | %± |
|---|---|---|---|
| 2000 | 7,154 | | — |
| 2010 | 7,818 | | 9.3% |
| 2020 | 8,628 | | 10.4% |
| 2025 (est.) | 9,302 | | 7.8% |
U.S. Decennial Census

Chartiers Township is a township in Washington County, Pennsylvania, United States. The population was 8,628 at the 2020 census. Along with the borough of Houston, the township makes up the Chartiers-Houston School District. It is part of the Pittsburgh metropolitan area.

== Geography ==
According to the United States Census Bureau, the township has a total area of 24.5 square miles (63 km^{2}), all land.

== Demographics ==
As of the census of 2000, there were 7,154 people, 2,814 households, and 2,006 families residing in the township. The population density was 291.7 people per square mile (112.6 people/km^{2}). There were 2,938 housing units at an average density of 119.8 per square mile (46.3/km^{2}). The racial makeup of the township was 95.40% White, 3.68% African American, 0.03% Native American, 0.13% Asian, 0.06% Pacific Islander, 0.13% from other races, and 0.59% from two or more races. Hispanic or Latino of any race were 0.36% of the population.

There were 2,814 households, out of which 26.7% had children under the age of 18 living with them, 58.3% were married couples living together, 9.1% had a female householder with no husband present, and 28.7% were non-families. 25.1% of all households were made up of individuals, and 13.3% had someone living alone who was 65 years of age or older. The average household size was 2.45 and the average family size was 2.93.

In the township the population was spread out, with 20.5% under the age of 18, 5.6% from 18 to 24, 26.4% from 25 to 44, 26.3% from 45 to 64, and 21.1% who were 65 years of age or older. The median age was 44 years. For every 100 females there were 92.4 males. For every 100 females age 18 and over, there were 87.5 males.

The median income for a household in the township was $37,679, and the median income for a family was $45,417. Males had a median income of $37,101 versus $26,170 for females. The per capita income for the township was $18,116. About 5.2% of families and 6.9% of the population were below the poverty line, including 9.9% of those under age 18 and 4.1% of those age 65 or over.

== History ==
=== Origins of the township ===
The township was named after Peter Chartier, a trapper of French and Shawnee parentage who established a Pekowi Shawnee community in this area in 1734. In April 1745, Chartier and the Shawnees abandoned the town when the Pennsylvania provincial council indicted him for treason after he defied Governor Patrick Gordon over the sale of rum to the Shawnees.

The historical character of Chartiers Township has been significantly influenced by its agricultural history, its natural resources such as coal and oil and its location along major transportation routes. In 1774, Colonel James Allison was one of the first settlers on Chartiers Creek. His family was one of the twenty families who came to this area in that year, among whom were the Scotts, McDowells, Parks, Morrisions, Struthers, Norrises, and others. At this time, there was navigation on Chartiers Creek. The US Congress declared this creek navigable and in fact some local entrepreneurs used it as a means of shipping flour to New Orleans.

Chartiers Township is located in Washington County, which was formed during the Revolutionary War period on March 28, 1781, from part of Westmoreland County. It was the first County formed after the signing of the Declaration of Independence. The new County was quite large and contained what would later become Greene, Allegheny and Beaver Counties.

On March 23, 1790, Chartiers Township was established by the Washington County Court of Quarter Session from the southern part of Cecil Township, with a petition from the inhabitants residing in its boundaries. The boundaries of the Township were reduced in 1791 by the establishment of Canton Township and Mt. Pleasant Township in 1808, and by the incorporation of and annexations by Canonsburg and Houston Boroughs. The emergence of the Chartiers Valley Railroad and then the local Interstate Highways mitigated the creek's use for transportation, but its significance at the end of the 18th century is demonstrated in the name for the Township. In May 1790, John Canon, the founder of Canonsburg, loaded two boats with forty barrels of flour from his mill and shipped them to New Orleans via Chartiers Creek and the Ohio River. On April 8, 1793, an act was passed by the state legislature declaring "Chartiers Creek a public highway for boats and rafts."

When coal was discovered in Washington County in the 1880s, it was shipped down Chartiers Creek to the Ohio River in times of high water. Coal had also become one of the main products of Chartiers Township for many years. Bituminous coal was first discovered in Washington County on the James Allison tract circa 1800. It was mined for a long time for domestic use and for blacksmithing purposes at twenty-five (25) cents a bushel. By 1876, twenty (20) or more coal banks could be counted and with the coming of the railroads, mining became a big business. The wealth of coal drew interest in the Township for its solid employment opportunities, though the work could be dirty and dangerous. Soon the extraction and transportation of coal become more advanced and the need for workers escalated. Mining was the chief occupation, with mines in the Meadow Lands, Richhill, Arden, Midland and Westland areas. Early towns were Arden, Meadow Lands, McGovern, Shingiss, McConnells Mill and Gretna.

In 1850, the Township's population was 1,677 persons and by 1900 it was 2,141 persons. In 1834, the Township was divided into seven districts, and in 1836 comfortable school houses were erected in each district. School funding in 1836 was $876.15 but had decreased in 1837 to $696.62. By 1880, there were ten districts with ten teachers and 369 students and in 1908; there were twenty schools and 830 students. Average salary for a teacher was $57.50 (males) and $48.00 (females) in 1908. The Township began building its own high school in the early 1940s. Chartiers and Houston formed a jointure and the Chartiers-Houston School District had its first graduating class in 1956. By 2005 and 2006, Allison Park Elementary and Chartiers Houston Junior/Senior High School had 1188 students.

=== Significant historical sites and events ===
Chartiers Township has been the site of significant historical events over the past three hundred years. The "Concord Coaches" stage coach line ran through the Meadow Lands on the Pittsburgh and Washington line, whose function was later replaced by Chartiers Valley Railway also located in the Township. The Chartiers Valley Railroad Company was begun in 1830 and was the second railroad project of its size in the United States. The Railroad Company started to build rail lines from Pittsburgh in 1857, to Canonsburg in 1869, finally completed to Washington in 1871. This railroad brought a great change in the valley as coal mines were opened and farmers could ship their produce and milk to Pittsburgh and many other kinds of trade were carried over the new railroad.

In 1886, Ewing Pump Station was erected by the Southwest Pennsylvania Oil Company and was located in the Meadow Lands. It pumped about 50,000 barrels of oil per day, to and from different points within a radius of thirty-five miles. The total tankage stored at the station was about 2,409,000 barrels, contained in seventy tanks. On June 23, 1908, two 50,000 barrel oil tanks were struck by lightning. One tank exploded sending thousands of barrels of burning oil floating down Chartiers Creek, killing all vegetation and trees along the stream for a mile.

In 1911, the Washington County Fair Association was chartered and the first fair exhibition was held at Arden Downs in the Township. The Hagan Stock farm at Arden was chosen to purchase as the fair's location due to its excellent race track. The farm had been used for training and racing horses, with complete facilities for horse boarding year round. The principal attraction of the fair at that time and for years to follow was this racing track. The fair has expanded over the years drawing thousands to view its agricultural events and exhibits and for traditional fair rides, entertainment, games and local food. Other events are also located at the fairgrounds throughout the year. The Washington County Fair has continued through the century as a growing and flourishing enterprise and continues as a showcase for the region's agricultural enterprises.

The Pennsylvania Trolley Museum is also located in the Township, on the former Pittsburgh Railways Company's trolley line to Washington, a line which was abandoned in 1953. This trolley system served as an important link for the south hills of Pittsburgh and Washington County residents who traveled for work, shopping, and recreation. The non-profit Pittsburgh Electric Railway Club (later the Pennsylvania Railway Museum Association) purchased a 2,000-foot section of abandoned railway line from the Pittsburgh Railways Company in 1954. It had been used by the Washington interurban trolley line from Washington to Pittsburgh. The museum is located near the Washington County Fairgrounds in Chartiers Township. On February 7, 1954, the museum's first three cars were moved to the site. The museum was opened to the public in June 1963, providing visitors with short demonstration trolley rides and an informal tour of the car house. Since then, using mostly volunteer help, new cars and facilities including the Visitor Education Center, Museum store and Trolley Display Building have been built and more than thirty (30) cars are on display to the public. A "spur" off the original section of trolley track has been built across the road to the County Fairgrounds to allow fair visitors to experience a ride a scenic 4-mile ride on a restored trolley. The Pennsylvania Trolley Museum exceptionally preserves the historical significance of this once vital form of transportation through the region.

In the early 1950s, a one-room office building with garage was constructed for a township municipal building. In 1993, the Board of Supervisors entered into a building project to renovate the existing Township Building and garages into administrative offices, tax offices and Police Department, plus razing a portion of the Fort Pitt Fixture Building to make room for a new meeting center and parking lot. The remaining section of Fort Pitt's building was steel-sided and houses the Public Works Department.

The John White House was listed on the National Register of Historic Places in 1998.

=== Present and regional setting ===
Chartiers Township is a 24.53 square mile municipality located in central Washington County, five (5) miles north of the City of Washington and twenty-five (25) miles southwest of the major metropolitan area of Pittsburgh. The Township is bordered on the northwest by Mount Pleasant Township, northeast by Cecil Township, the east by Canonsburg Borough, Houston Borough and North Strabane Township, the southeast by South Strabane Township and the southwest by Canton Township. Along its southeastern border, runs Chartiers Creek separating it from North and South Strabane. Regional access to the Township is provided by Interstate 79 on to Racetrack Road and Pike Street. The Township is governed by a Board of Supervisors, with the assistance of municipal staff and Commissions, such as the Planning Commission and Zoning Hearing Board. The Chartiers-Houston School District services the educational needs of the Township in addition to the residents of Houston Borough.

Chartiers Township can be categorized as primarily a residential and agricultural community. Many seek rural parcels in the Township for the keeping of private horses, and farming is still a viable enterprise. There are many post World War II housing developments along with new residential developments making it a 'bedroom community'. Residential development pressures have increased from nearby growth areas such as Peters Township, North and South Strabane and Allegheny County. New residential development in the Township over the past ten years includes Arden Mills, The Ridgeview Plan and The Summit. Despite this, much of Chartiers nearly twenty-five (25) square miles is still rural in nature. Most suburban development in the Township has and will occur on agricultural land and/or on wooded sites.

The Meadow Lands is home to most of the commercial establishments. There are a number of light industrial sites between the Washington County Fairgrounds and Chartiers-Houston High School. Throughout the 1970s and 1980s the region suffered with the loss of traditional mining and manufacturing employment base. As some of these mining and industrial enterprises in the Township have closed, new industry has located in the Township such as the DBT National Headquarters. The Arden Landfill is located in the Township and the Department of Environmental Protection has issued a major permit modification to Arden Landfill Inc., authorizing an expansion of the existing municipal landfill in Chartiers Township from 280 acres to 434 acres. Historically, the Township is best known for the two important cultural amenities of the Washington County Fairgrounds and the Pennsylvania Trolley Museum. These two resources and the events held at them should be utilized to promote the Township in the region.

Chartiers Township's resources and convenient location in the regional transportation network has attracted increased development pressures. The Township's proximity to the retail development along Route 19/Interstate 79 from Allegheny County and the substantial development of the North and South Strabane corridor with Trinity Point, the Meadows Racetrack and Casino and the Tanger Outlets have had a significant impact on the community. The easy access and proximity of these employment and commercial activities make the Township even more attractive as a place to reside. These centers provide employment, shopping and cultural opportunities while their proximity will continue to place growth and development pressures upon the Township. The availability of land in the area will act as impetus for the attraction of development in the community. The lack of water and sewage service in many areas may be one of the impediments to future growth.
