= Canonsburg Opera House disaster =

1911 disaster in Pennsylvania, US

Coordinates: 40.2586°N 80.1862°W

Canonsburg Opera House Disaster
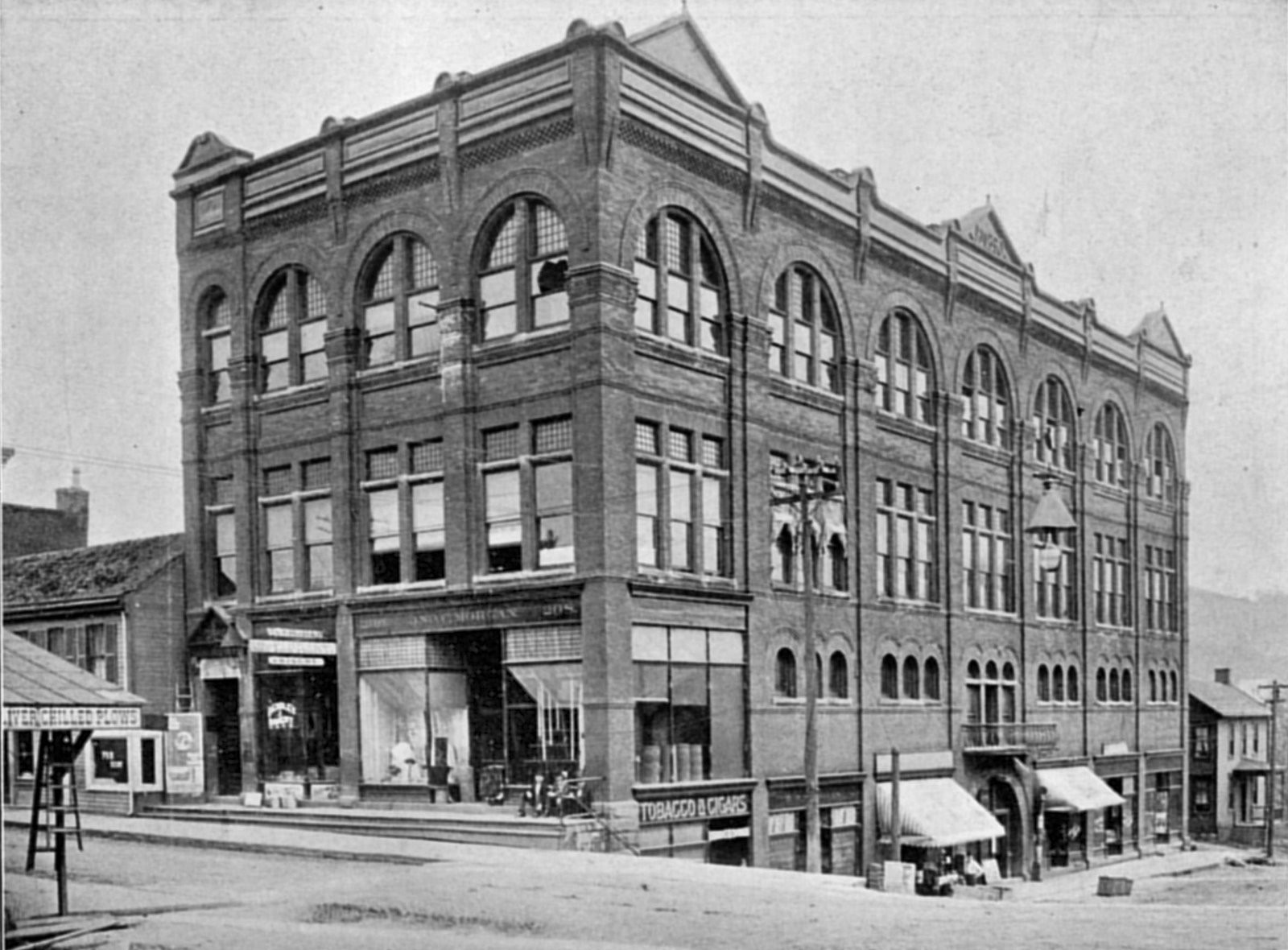
- The Morgan Building in Canonsburg, Pennsylvania
- Date: August 26, 1911
- Location: Morgan Building, Canonsburg, Pennsylvania, United States
- Type: Stampede
- Cause: Projector Malfunction / False Alarm
- Deaths: 26

The Canonsburg Opera House disaster occurred on August 26, 1911, in Canonsburg, Pennsylvania. A false shout of "fire" triggered a panic that killed twenty-six people.

During the evening showing of a motion picture, a projector malfunction resulted in a sudden flash of light on the screen. Although no fire resulted, a crowd of theater patrons rushed to the exit of the second story theater and became lodged in the doorway which served as the theater's main entrance and exit.

== The building ==
Constructed in 1891, the Morgan Building is located at the intersection of North Central Avenue and Pike Street in Canonsburg. It contains two floors of commercial space, the lowest level of storefronts facing North Central Avenue and two more being situated on its second floor, which is level with Pike Street. In its original configuration, the theater, which was situated on the third level, seated approximately five-hundred people. Two lodging rooms occupied the uppermost floor.

In 1902, the theater was renovated. The lodging rooms were removed and the auditorium space heightened to accommodate a balcony, private boxes, better lighting and improved ventilation. The seating capacity increased to 884—with 552 seats being on the floor, 132 situated in the balcony and the gallery holding 200. The entrance and stairway to the theater, a single and continuous flight of twenty-six steps that accommodated both incoming and outgoing patrons, remained unchanged.

The doors at the foot of the stairs were reportedly able to swing both inward and outward. On the evening of the disaster, they were opened inwardly and latched, creating a bottleneck for a crowd moving from the six-and-a-half foot wide staircase to the four-foot eight-and-a-half inch doorway.

Less than twenty days after the panic, the decision was made to convert the auditorium into apartments and workers began removing the seats.

== Aftermath ==
Sixteen months after the Canonsburg event, a false shout of "fire" was used to purposefully incite a panic at the Italian Hall in Calumet, Michigan.

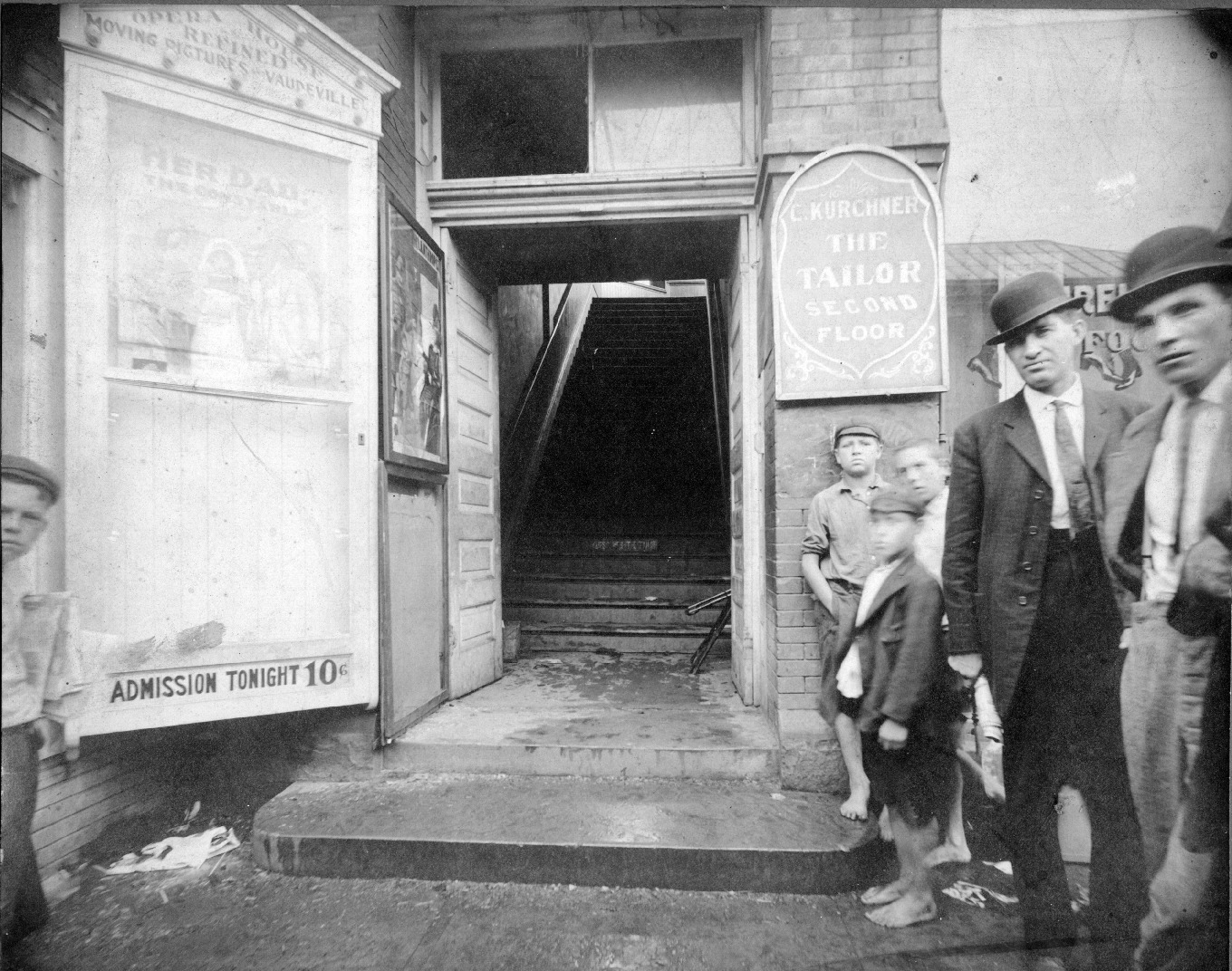
Entrance and stairway to the Canonsburg Opera House as photographed on the morning after the stampede

As both the Canonsburg and Calumet panic events were international news stories occurring less than a decade before, there is speculation that both events were the inspiration for Oliver Wendell Holmes's illustration of unprotected speech in his opinion in the 1919 United States Supreme Court case Schenck v. United States.

== Victims ==
Of those killed, twenty-four died inside the stairwell, one rescuer was killed by a person falling from a transom, and one audience member who, according to eyewitness accounts, escaped the theater, ran across the street and died. The man had escaped by running across the heads and faces of the trapped victims as they were being crushed. He had also pushed a phonograph machine through a transom window where it and a shower of broken glass landed on rescue workers. He then crossed the street and died from some combination of panic-related health complications and injuries he incurred while being physically assaulted by onlooking townspeople.
