= Archie Strimel =

American soccer player

Personal information
- Full name: Archibald Louis Strimel
- Date of birth: June 30, 1918
- Place of birth: Cecil, Pennsylvania, United States
- Date of death: March 29, 1990 (aged 71)
- Position: Goalkeeper

Senior career*
Years	Team	Apps	(Gls)
- Morgan Strasser
- Curry Vets
- Pittsburgh Beadling

International career
1948	United States	3	
- * Club domestic league appearances and goals

Archibald Louis Strimel (June 30, 1918 – March 29, 1990) was an American soccer goalkeeper who was a member of the 1948 U.S. Olympic soccer team. He also earned two caps with the U.S. national team that year.

== Biography ==
Strimel graduated from Cecil High School where he played soccer, basketball and baseball. In 1935, Strimel and his team mates won the Pennsylvania Class B High School Basketball championship. He then went to work in the coal mines before being drafted into the Army during World War II.

In the late 1930s and early 1940s, Strimel played for Morgan Strasser. He also played for Pittsburgh Beadling

In 1948, Strimel was selected for the U.S. soccer team at the Summer Olympics. He played in the 9–0 loss to Italy in the first round of the Olympics, which eliminated the U.S. from the tournament. Following the Olympics, the U.S. played two full internationals, an 11–0 loss to Norway, followed by a 5–0 loss to Northern Ireland on August 11, 1948.

At the time he was selected for the Olympic team, he was playing for the Curry Vets of Curry, Pennsylvania. Curry was a top amateur team, losing the 1948 National Amateur Cup to Fall River Ponta Delgada. He was also a successful minor league baseball player for the Brooklyn Dodgers.

In 2009, Strimel was inducted into the Pennsylvania Sports Hall of Fame.
