= Canonsburg Lake =

Lake in Canonsburg, Pennsylvania

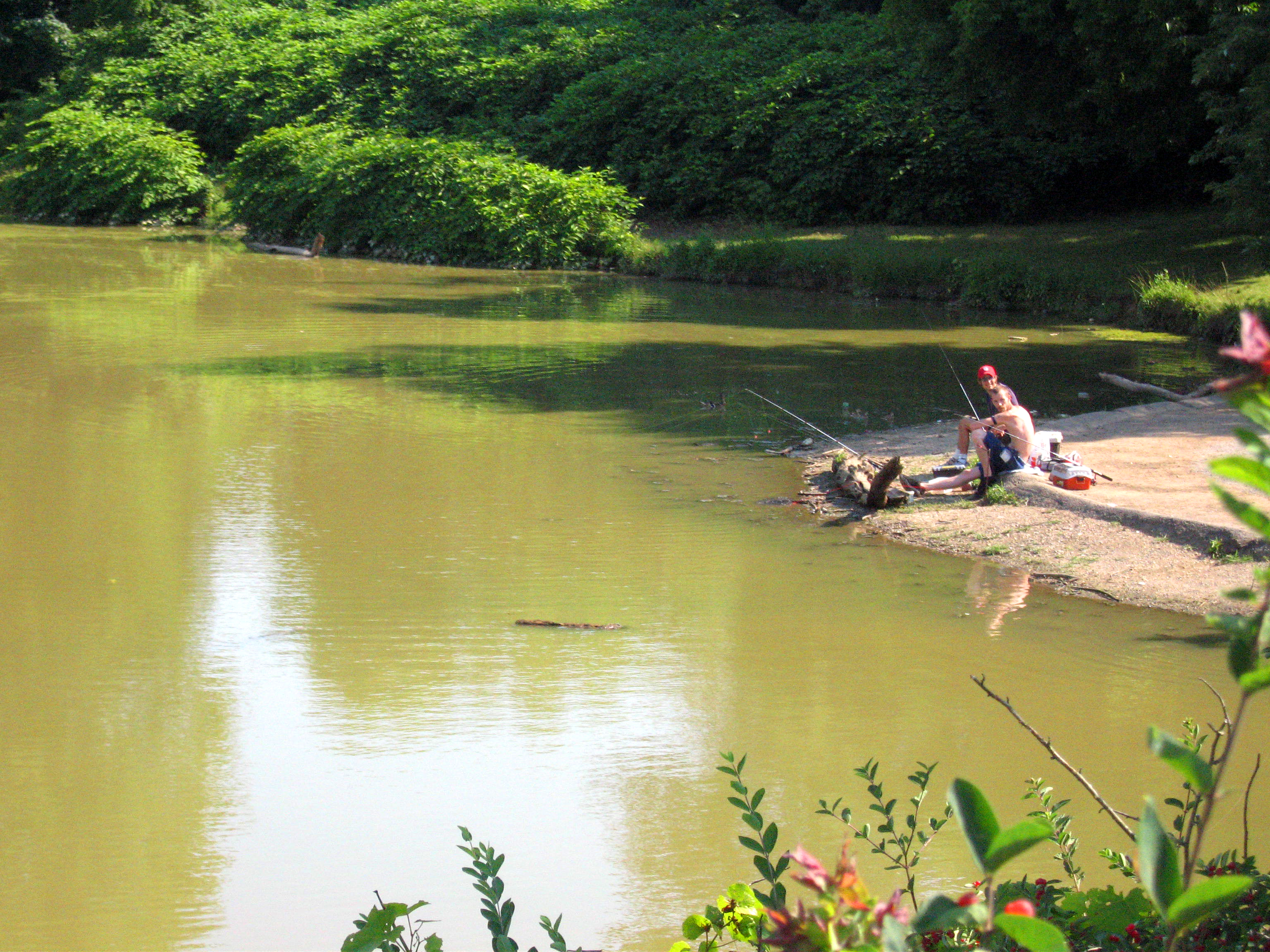
- People fishing on the shore of the lake

- Location within Pennsylvania Location within the United States
- Location: Washington County, Pennsylvania
- Coordinates: 40°16′7″N 80°7′52.68″W
- Lake type: artificial
- Primary inflows: Little Chartiers Creek
- Primary outflows: Chartiers Creek
- Catchment area: 46 square miles (120 km^{2})
- Basin countries: United States
- Built: 1943
- Surface area: 76 acres (31 ha)
- Max. depth: 18 feet (5.5 m) (approximate)
- Surface elevation: 899 feet (274 m)
- Settlements: Canonsburg, Pennsylvania

Canonsburg Lake is a lake in Canonsburg, Pennsylvania. It is an artificial lake formed by the waters of Little Chartiers Creek behind a 525 feet (160 m) long and 45 feet (14 m) high concrete dam. The dam was built in 1943 by Alcoa to create a freshwater reservoir for the Canonsburg Forging Plant, which was considered a strategic resource during World War II. In 1957, (Note: Some sources claim 1958 instead of 1957.) the Pennsylvania Fish and Boat Commission (PFBC) acquired the 138-acre (56 ha) property from Alcoa, which included the 76-acre (31 ha) surface area of the lake plus the dam and surrounding lands. The PFBC converted the body of water from an industrial reservoir into a recreational lake.

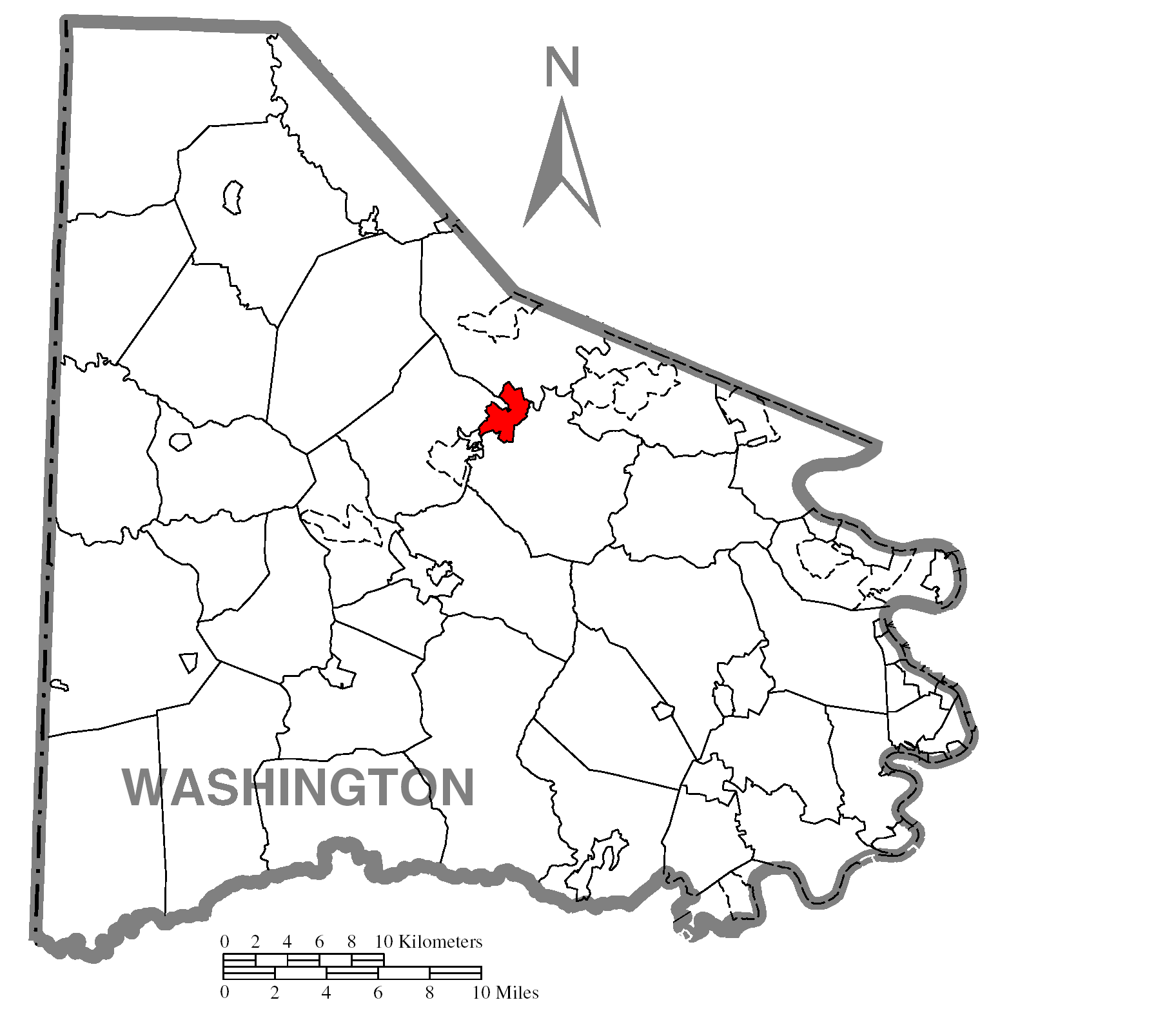
Map of Washington County with Canonsburg highlighted

== Boating ==
Most boats on Canonsburg Lake are small craft such as canoes, inflatable boats, and shallow-draft, lightweight fishing boats. Restrictions limit powered boats to those that use an electric motor. Diesel-powered boats are not allowed. There is a boat launch ramp on the eastern shore of the lake with a parking lot with a capacity of "at least 10 vehicles." (Note: This is the capacity the PFBC claims, but aerial photography of the parking lot suggests it is actually substantially larger than that.) Only registered boats (or those with a valid launch permit issued by the Commission or PA Dept. of Conservation and Natural Resources) are allowed on the lake.

== Fishing ==
Recreational shore fishing is permitted at Canonsburg Lake under the statewide fishing regulations for Commonwealth Inland Waters, which govern fishing season, minimum fish size, and daily catch limits for many species of fish. The PFBC stocks Canonsburg Lake with several species, including channel catfish, muskellunge, tiger muskellunge fingerlings, and trout. According to a survey of the lake conducted by PFBC staff in May 2000, the following species of fish were present in Canonsburg Lake, sorted here by number of specimen caught:

Fish Species	Number Collected	Size Range (inches)	Additional Comments
Gizzard shad	732	Not measured	N/A
White crappie	383	3–14	2% greater than 9 inches (23 cm)
Largemouth bass	95	4–20	51% greater than 12 inches (30 cm), 27% greater than 15 inches (38 cm)
Brown bullhead	92	3–12	4% greater than 10 inches (25 cm)
Black crappie	47	3–11	N/A
Common carp	38	Not measured	N/A
Bluegill	34	3–8	9% greater than 7 inches (18 cm)
White sucker	32	Not measured	N/A
Channel catfish	23	4–24	57% greater than 16 inches (41 cm)
Brown trout (hatchery)	14	Not measured	N/A
Golden shiner	10	Not measured	N/A
Pumpkinseed	7	3–6	N/A
Rainbow trout (hatchery)	3	Not measured	N/A
Green sunfish	1	3	N/A

The surveyors noted that the lake "contained an excellent population of largemouth bass. Quality-size bass were present in high numbers". The lake is also renowned by fishermen in southwestern Pennsylvania for its robust population of channel catfish.

== Maintenance problems ==
Due to the chronic underfunding of lake maintenance, an organization called the Canonsburg Lake Restoration & Improvement Committee formed in 2000 to raise awareness and to raise funds for Canonsburg Lake's maintenance issues. The two primary problems are the need for dam repairs and silt removal.

=== Dam deficiencies ===
The dam of Canonsburg Lake was considered deficient in several ways by a 1996 assessment by Schnabel Engineering Associates. The deficiencies included minor surface deterioration of the concrete, insufficient spillway capacity, and the lack of a low level outlet for the reservoir, among other problems. According to the PFBC, the estimated cost for repairs to the dam is $83 million, but no funding exists for this maintenance, either.

=== Silting problems ===
Like many other aging artificial lakes, Canonsburg Lake has a problem with silting raising the bed of the lake. This process has already made some parts of the lake unnavigable, and if left untreated by dredging, it may ultimately make the lake unusable by boaters. A dredging program would cost approximately $3 million, but no funding exists to implement one. There is a website that has been created to raise the funds coordinated by local residents who live on the lake. Visit Save Canonsburg Lake for more information on how to help.
