= Canonsburg Armory =

- U.S. National Register of Historic Places
- Washington County History & Landmarks Foundation Landmark
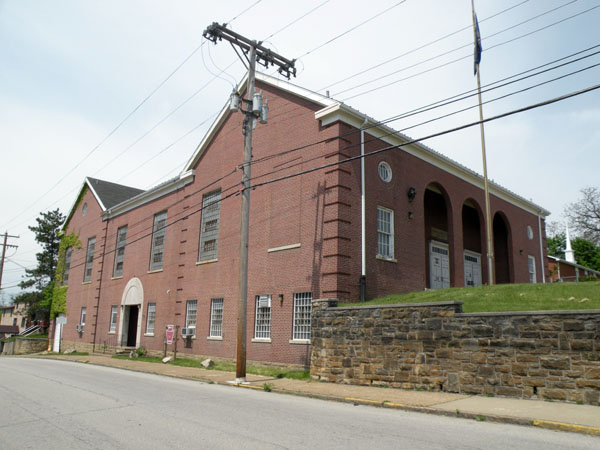
- Canonsburg Armory in 2010

- Location within Pennsylvania
- Location: West College Street and North Central Avenue, Canonsburg, Pennsylvania
- Coordinates: 40°15′37.2″N 80°11′15″W
- Area: 0.51 acres (0.21 ha)
- Built: 1938
- Architect: George W. Brugger
- Architectural style: Colonial Revival
- MPS: Pennsylvania National Guard Armories MPS
- NRHP reference No.: 89002070
- Added to NRHP: December 22, 1989

The Canonsburg Armory is a former Pennsylvania National Guard armory in Canonsburg, Pennsylvania. It was listed on the National Register of Historic Places on December 22, 1989.

It is designated as a historic public landmark by the Washington County History & Landmarks Foundation.

== History ==
The armory was built in 1938 at a cost of $85,548, funded by the Public Works Administration.

In 2010, the armory was sold to the Borough of Canonsburg for $268,000.

== See also ==
- National Register of Historic Places listings in Washington County, Pennsylvania
