= John White House (Chartiers Township, Pennsylvania) =

Historic house in Pennsylvania, United States

- U.S. National Register of Historic Places
- Washington County History & Landmarks Foundation Landmark
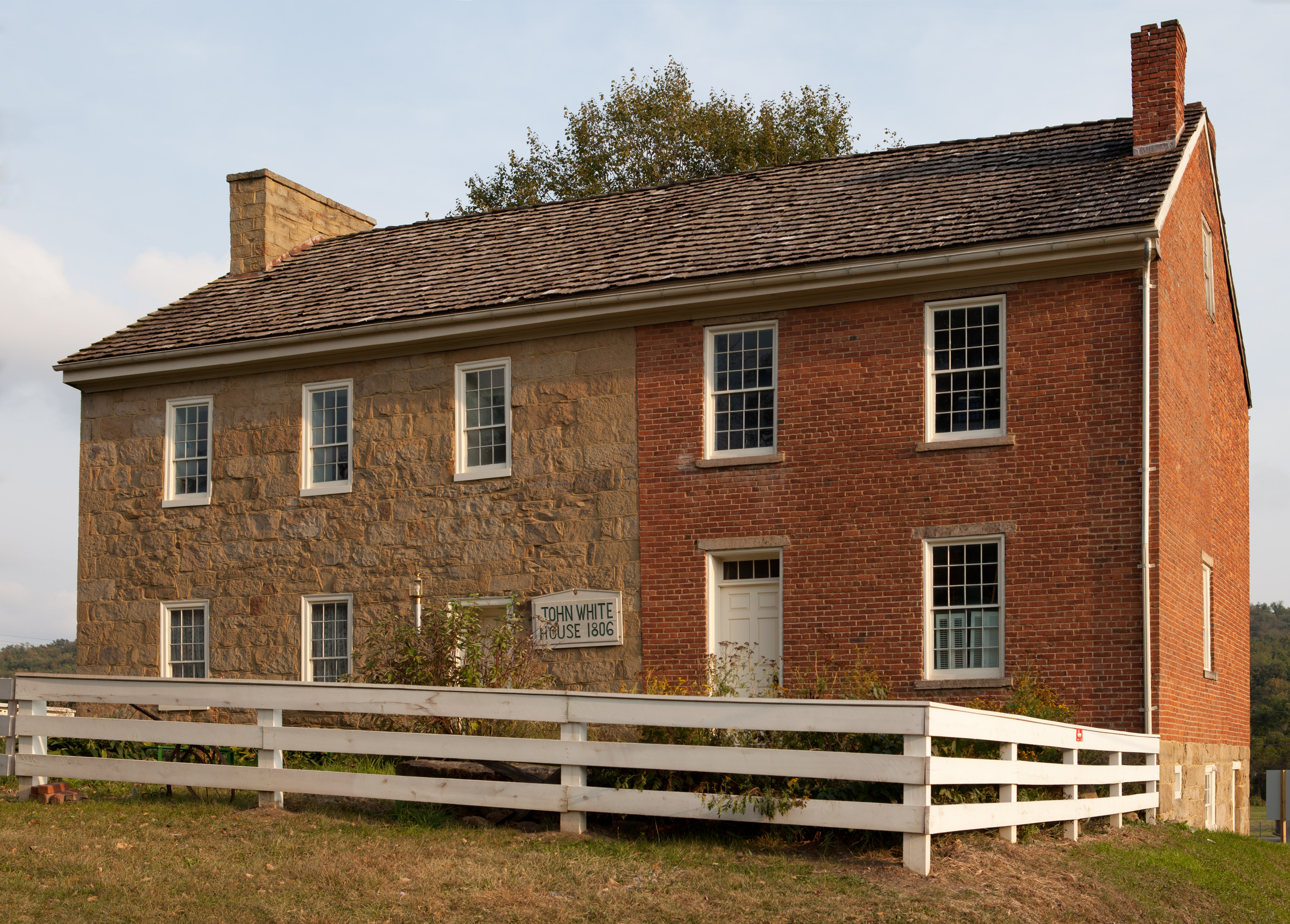

- Location within Pennsylvania Location within the United States
- Location: 2151 N. Main St. Extension, Chartiers Township, Pennsylvania
- Coordinates: 40°12′28″N 80°15′25″W
- Area: less than one acre
- Built: 1806
- Architectural style: Federal
- NRHP reference No.: 98001370
- Added to NRHP: November 12, 1998

The John White House is an historic building that is located in Chartiers Township, Washington County, Pennsylvania, United States.

== History and architectural features ==
This structure was designated as a historic residential landmark/farmstead by the Washington County History & Landmarks Foundation.
