= John McMillan's Log School =

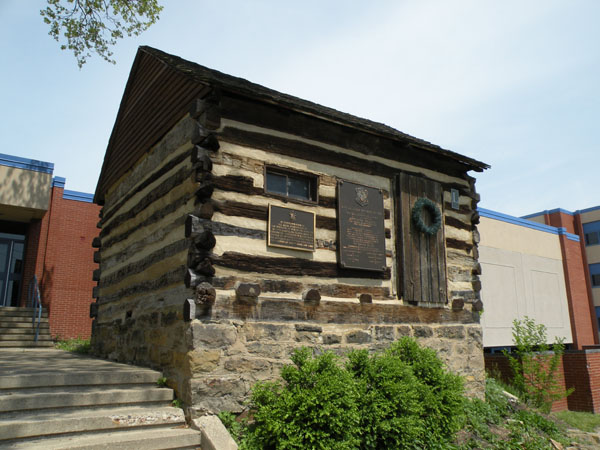
- The log school in 2010
- Interactive map of the John McMillan's Log School area

General information
- Type: Log building
- Architectural style: Vernacular architecture
- Location: Outside the Canonsburg Middle School, 25 East College Street; Canonsburg, Pennsylvania, Canonsburg, Pennsylvania, United States
- Coordinates: 40°15′38″N 80°11′11″W

John McMillan's Log School is a landmark log building in Canonsburg, Pennsylvania that was the site of John McMillan's frontier Latin school during the 1780s. It is a symbol of Canonsburg and Canonsburg's educational tradition. In 1930, The Pittsburgh Press said that the building was "viewed by the pioneers with even more reverence than Pittsburgh now view the towering Cathedral of Learning in Oakland." It is one of the oldest buildings in Western Pennsylvania. It is the "oldest educational building west of the Allegheny Mountains."

The school grew into Canonsburg Academy, which eventually developed into Washington & Jefferson College.

The building is rectangular in shape and is 14 feet long.

It was originally located in a field a mile south of Canonsburg. McMillan based the school on the William Tennent's Log College in eastern Pennsylvania. The building doubled as a stable when McMillan was not teaching classes. After only a year, the original building was destroyed by fire and rebuilt. The curriculum was a generalized classical education, including mathematics, grammar, rhetoric, natural history, Greek, and Latin, with a focus on preparing young men for Presbyterian ministry. It was moved to its current location in front of the Canonsburg Middle School, which stood of the location of Jefferson College, in 1895.

After McMillan died in 1833, his family continued to operate his farm and used the building as a workshop space. Jefferson College students often made the pilgrimage from Canonsburg to the building. In 1894, the building was offered to Jefferson Academy, which then occupied the former Jefferson College campus. Jefferson Academy closed in 1910 and the maintenance of the building fell to Phi Gamma Delta and Phi Kappa Psi, two fraternities that were founded at Jefferson College. In 1930, the building was adopted by the national officers of Phi Gamma Delta. The original preservation plan called for the college to be protected by a steel and glass canopy. The fraternity agreed to fund the restoration of the building.

In 1940, Phi Gamma Delta attempted to move the building to the campus of Washington & Jefferson College in Washington, Pennsylvania, a plan that caused an uproar from the Canonsburg community. In response, Phi Gamma Delta let the town retake control over the building, which was then placed under the care of a "Log Cabin Association."

In 2004, the Jefferson College Historical Society's Log Cabin Preservation Project Committee decided to restore the building. The renovation project was jointly funded by Phi Gamma Delta, Phi Kappa Psi, and the historical society's Log Cabin Fund.

== Gallery ==
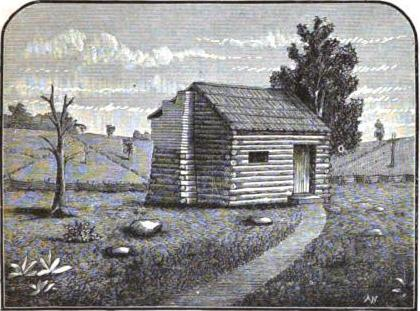
An engraving showing the building in its original location

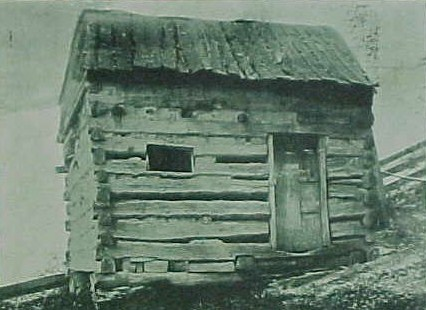
The building at its original location on the McMillan farm

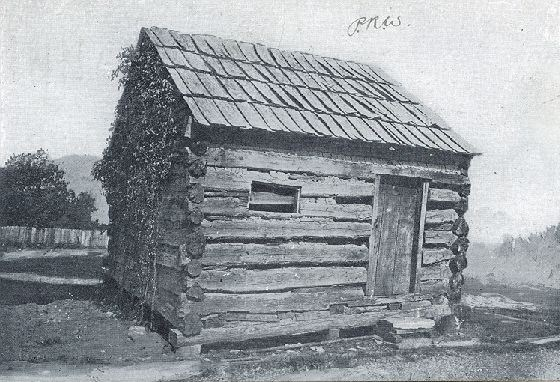
The building in its first Canonsburg location on the campus of Jefferson Academy

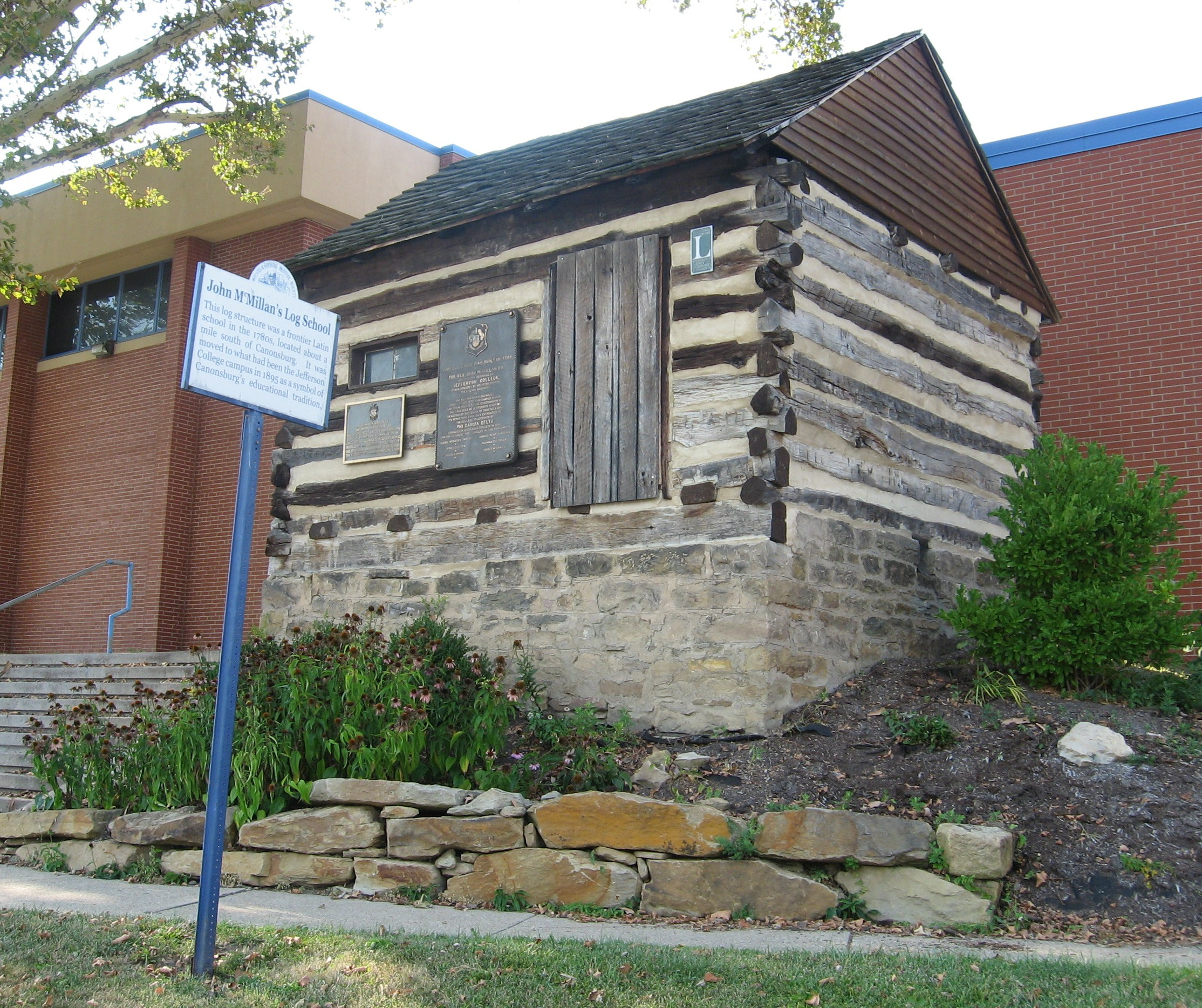
The building in its current location, showing the "L" landmark tag and the Canonsburg historical marker

== See also ==
- Media related to John McMillan's Log School at Wikimedia Commons
- Colonial Colleges
