= Houston, Pennsylvania =

Borough in Pennsylvania, US

Houston
- Borough
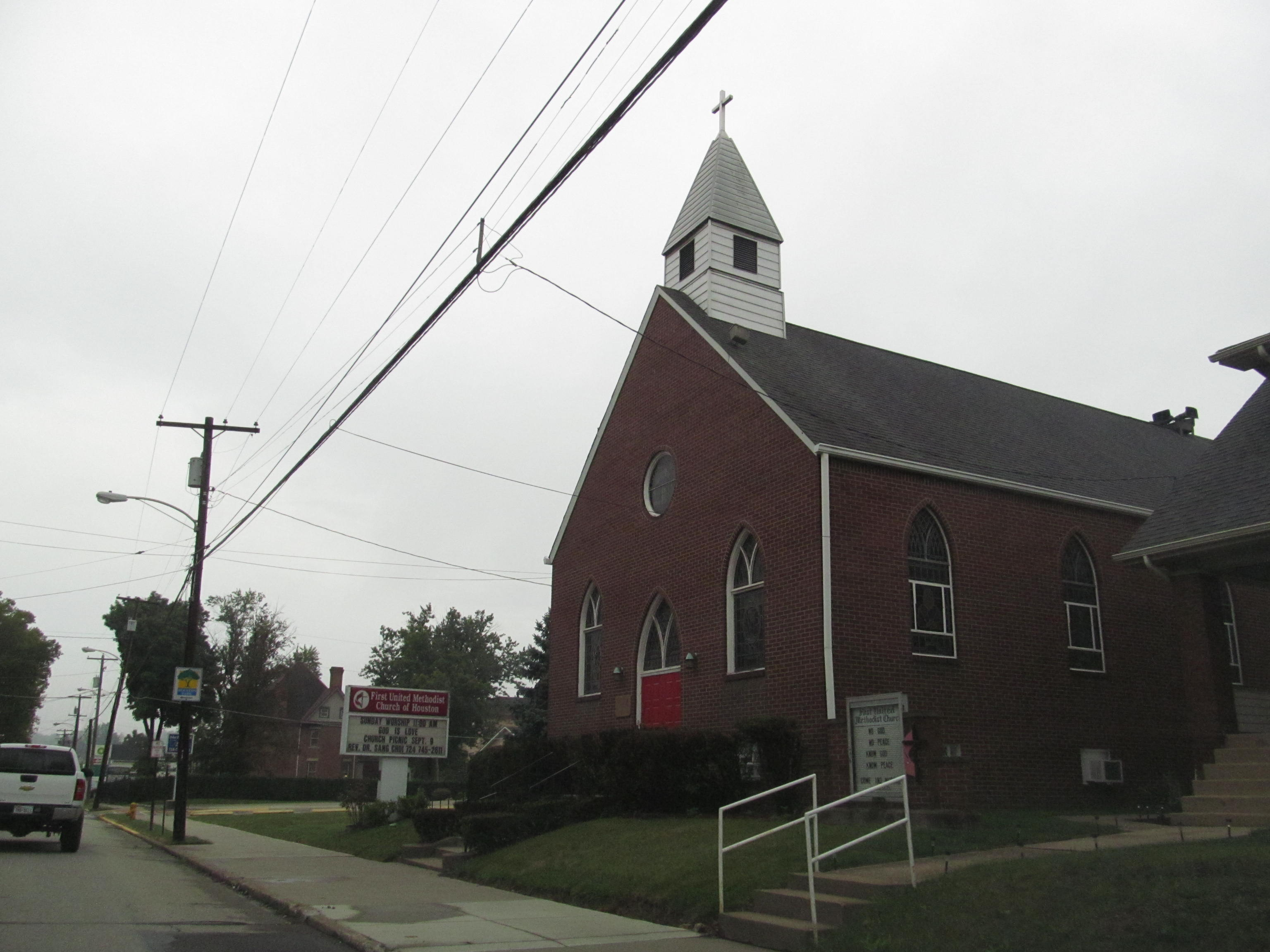
- Pike Street north of downtown

- Location of Houston in Washington County, Pennsylvania.

- Location of Houston in Pennsylvania
- Coordinates: 40°14′59″N 80°12′37″W
- Country: United States
- State: Pennsylvania
- County: Washington
- Established: 1901

Government
  - Mayor: Nicholle R. Hollenbach

Area
  - Total: 0.41 sq mi (1.06 km^{2})
  - Land: 0.41 sq mi (1.06 km^{2})
  - Water: 0 sq mi (0.00 km^{2})

Population (2020)
  - Total: 1,172
  - Density: 2,852.4/sq mi (1,101.31/km^{2})
- Time zone: UTC-5 (EST)
  - Summer (DST): UTC-4 (EDT)
- ZIP code: 15342
- Area code: 724
- FIPS code: 42-35896
- Website: https://houstonborough.org/

Houston is a borough in Washington County, Pennsylvania, United States. The population was 1,165 at the 2020 census.

Students in Houston and neighboring Chartiers Township attend school in the Chartiers-Houston School District.

== Geography ==
Houston is located at 40°14′59″N 80°12′37″W (40.249790, -80.210275).

According to the United States Census Bureau, the borough has a total area of 0.4 square miles (1.0 km^{2}), all land. Several waterways go through Houston:

- Chartiers Creek flows through the borough.
- Chartiers Run joins Chartiers Creek at the borough of Houston.
- Plum Run joins Chartiers Run in the borough of Houston.

== Surrounding neighborhoods ==
Houston has three borders, including Chartiers Township to the north, south and west, Canonsburg to the northeast, and North Strabane Township to the east and southeast.

== History ==
The land on which this town stands was part of a tract purchased from John Haft on January 24, 1827, by Daniel Houston, a near relative of Gen. Sam Houston, leader of the Texans in their war for independence from Mexico. After the Chartiers Valley Railroad was completed through that section in 1871, David C. Houston, a son of Daniel Houston, saw the possibilities of a town at that point and laid out the present plan of Houstonville. The first house in the new town was completed in the summer of 1871 by A. T. Haft and the second by J. C. Johnson. A few years later H. E. Riggle laid out a plan adjoining which was called Riggletown. On May 13, 1901, The Borough of Houston was incorporated from land of Chartiers & North Strabane Townships.

== Demographics ==
Historical population
Census	Pop.	Note	%±
1910	793		—
1920	1,398		76.3%
1930	1,742		24.6%
1940	1,610		−7.6%
1950	1,957		21.6%
1960	1,865		−4.7%
1970	1,812		−2.8%
1980	1,568		−13.5%
1990	1,445		−7.8%
2000	1,314		−9.1%
2010	1,296		−1.4%
2020	1,172		−9.6%
2025 (est.)	1,126		−3.9%

As of the census of 2000, there were 1,314 people, 614 households, and 340 families residing in the borough. The population density was 3,581.7 inhabitants per square mile (1,382.9/km^{2}). There were 668 housing units at an average density of 1,820.8 per square mile (703.0/km^{2}). The racial makeup of the borough was 94.44% White, 3.65% African American, 0.08% Native American, 0.53% Asian, 0.15% from other races, and 1.14% from two or more races. Hispanic or Latino of any race were 0.38% of the population.

There were 614 households, out of which 22.8% had children under the age of 18 living with them, 38.4% were married couples living together, 12.5% had a female householder with no husband present, and 44.6% were non-families. 39.6% of all households were made up of individuals, and 19.4% had someone living alone who was 65 years of age or older. The average household size was 2.13 and the average family size was 2.91.

In the borough the population was spread out, with 19.1% under the age of 18, 7.8% from 18 to 24, 28.5% from 25 to 44, 23.3% from 45 to 64, and 21.3% who were 65 years of age or older. The median age was 42 years. For every 100 females, there were 87.2 males. For every 100 females age 18 and over, there were 82.3 males.

The median income for a household in the borough was $30,598, and the median income for a family was $42,083. Males had a median income of $31,413 versus $22,371 for females. The per capita income for the borough was $18,001. About 8.8% of families and 10.5% of the population were below the poverty line, including 17.8% of those under age 18 and 9.5% of those age 65 or over.

== Education ==
It is in the Chartiers-Houston School District.

== In popular culture ==
Houston's was one of the main filming locations for the 1988 film The Prince of Pennsylvania. The filming took place at a residence on S McNary Street as well as inside and outside of Chartiers Houston High School, the only high school in Houston borough.
