= Welcome Turner Jones =

American physician (1865–1940)

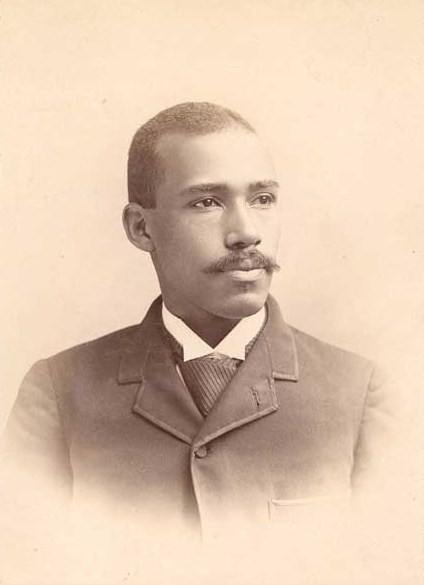
Welcome Turner Jones

Welcome Turner Jones (November 13, 1865 – January 12, 1940) was an American physician, who founded with three other African-American physicians the first black hospital in Newport News, Virginia. The hospital later became the Whittaker Memorial Hospital.

== Early life and education ==
Jones was born in Canonsburg, Pennsylvania, shortly after the end of the civil war in 1865, to S. T. Jones, an African Methodist Episcopal minister, and Margaret A. Jones, a homemaker. S. T. Jones pursued seminary studies at Western Theological Seminary in Pittsburgh, Pennsylvania, in 1862. Welcome Jones' paternal grandfather was Samuel Jones and maternal grandparents were George and Frances Hilton.

He attended and graduated from Washington and Jefferson College (W&J) in Washington, Pennsylvania, where he earned a bachelor's degree in 1890. Jones was the first African American on record to graduate from W&J College. He was awarded a masters degree from W&J College in 1900.

In A History of the Class of '90, published by W&J in 1901, John Campbell Palmer Jr. wrote that the class of 1890 was proud that among its class members was the only man of African descent who ever graduated from W&J College. Palmer wrote: "It is still prouder of the fact that Welcome Turner Jones has demonstrated to the world that when he has equal opportunities with his white brother, the [Black] man can be as successful in the profession as the Anglo-Saxon.".

Jones received a medical degree from Case Western University School of Medicine (formerly Western Reserve University) in Cleveland, Ohio in 1893. He worked his way through medical school at jobs ranging from hard labor in a brick yard, in harvest fields, and at a florist establishment.

== Medical career ==
After completing his medical degree in 1893, Jones relocated from Pennsylvania to Norfolk, Virginia, to establish a private practice for two years. In 1895, he moved to neighboring town Newport News, Virginia, where he built a lucrative private practice that focused largely on pediatrics with a special attention to diseases affecting children

=== Whittaker Memorial Hospital ===
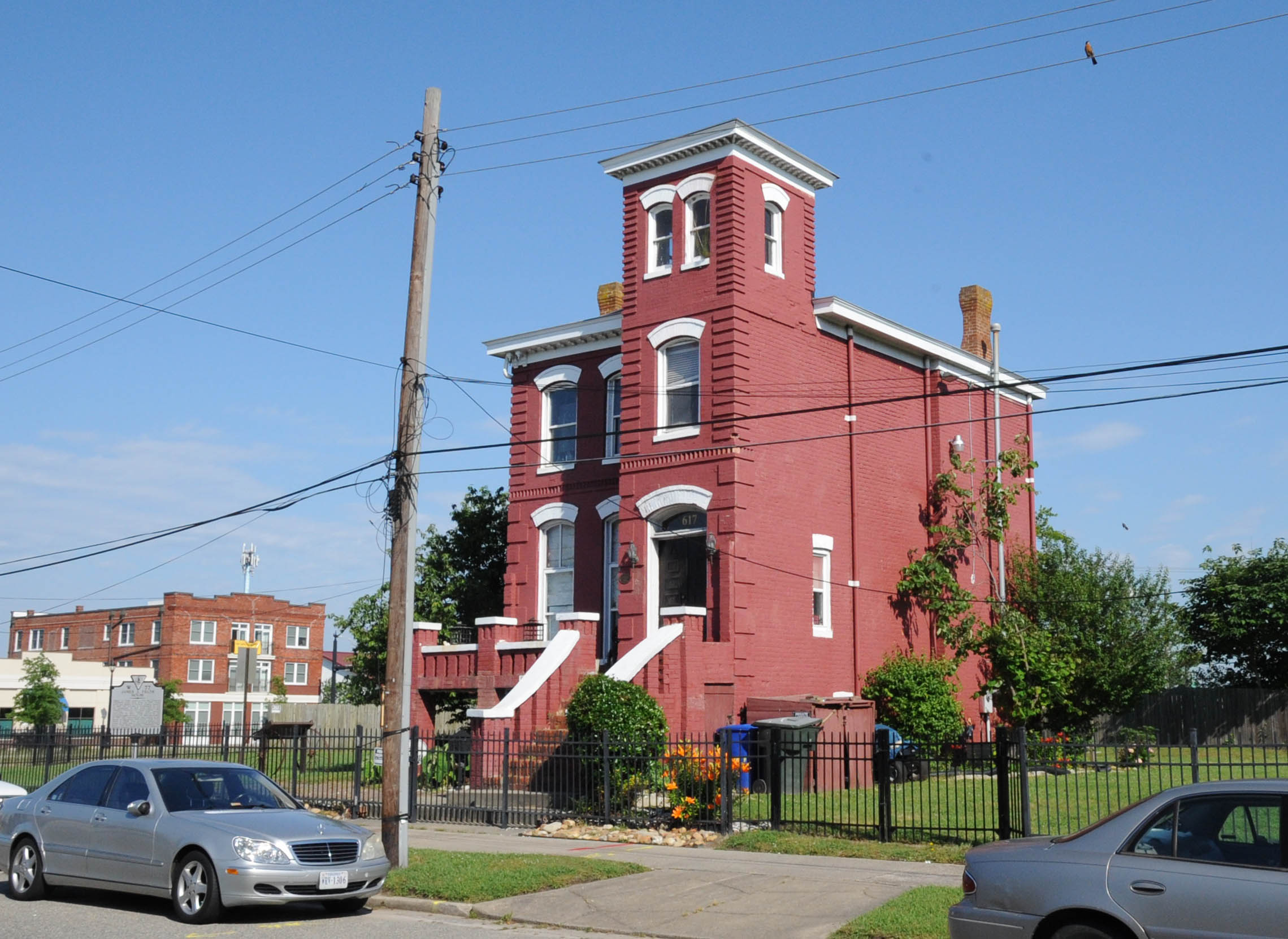
James A. Fields House, Newport News, VA

At the turn of the 20th century, African Americans throughout the United States were often denied medical attention or relegated to segregated, substandard medical facilities. In 1908, a team of four African-American doctors established the first hospital serving the black community. Jones and physicians Walter T. Foreman, W. P. Dickerson, and Robert L. Whittaker pooled together their savings to open a hospital on the top floor of the Italianate-style red brick building owned by James A. Fields, a prominent black lawyer and member of the Virginia House of Delegates. Prior to the hospital's founding, blacks could only receive medical care at a clinic in the city jail.

As the medical needs of the black community increasingly grew, the doctors set their sights on building a larger hospital to serve the black community. Jones served as the president of the Whittaker Memorial Association and helped the board trustees to raise funds for the construction and maintenance of the new hospital. A foundation was laid for the new general hospital, Whittaker Memorial Hospital, on May 27, 1914. Named in honor of Whittaker, who died prior to erecting the building, the hospital became the largest medical facility serving the black community in the state of Virginia.

Jones was a leading public health advocate and spoke out about health disparities affecting African Americans in Newport News and the U.S.

== Personal life ==
Jones married Bessie Lucas of Oil City, Pennsylvania on February 22, 1899. Bessie was the daughter of Samuel and Mary Ann Lucas of Oil City, Pennsylvania. The couple had two children, Margaret and Arnetta. Margaret was married Fletcher J. Bryant Sr., a Seventh-Day Adventist minister.

He was a prominent member of the A. M. E. Church. He also belonged to several secret and benevolent orders, including the Masons, Odd Fellows, Pythians, Elks, and Tabors. He was the medical examiner for the Odd Fellows order.

A skillful musician who played the bass and mandolin, he enjoyed reading poetry and the English and American classics.

== Retirement and death ==
Jones retired in 1938 to his family home in Washington, Pennsylvania after practicing medicine for 40 years in Newport News, Virginia. In retirement, he moved to Little Rock, Arkansas, to be closer to his daughter, Margaret Jones Bryant. He died at her home on January 12, 1940. Funeral services took place in Washington, Pennsylvania
