= Sarris Candies =

American confectionery company

Coordinates: 40°15′55″N 80°10′25″W

Sarris Candies, Inc.
- Type: Private
- Founded: 1960; 66 years ago
- Founder: Frank Sarris
- Headquarters: Canonsburg, Pennsylvania, United States
- Products: Baked Goods and Confectionery
- Website: http://www.sarriscandies.com

Sarris Candies, Inc., is a specialty chocolate and candies company based in Canonsburg, Pennsylvania, approximately 18 miles (29 km) southwest of Pittsburgh. It was founded in 1960 by Frank Sarris.

== History ==
Frank Sarris (September 22, 1931 – March 1, 2010) of Canonsburg, the son of Greek immigrants, started his candy business in 1960 by making chocolates in the basement of his Washington County, Pennsylvania, home.

Sarris learned how to produce chocolate from lifelong friend and mentor John Macris, a fellow Greek and founder of Philadelphia Candies. By 1963, Sarris had outgrown his basement, so he built a small candy shop next door to his house, and five years later the house was demolished to make room for an even bigger candy shop.

Over the years, the company grew to include more than 350 employees and $16 million in annual sales, according to the company's Web site. In 1982, with the help of his son, Sarris created his very own old-fashioned Ice cream parlor complete with period-style, red and brass booths and shimmering crystal chandeliers.

Today, the Sarris Chocolate Factory and Ice Cream Parlour fill an area the size of a football field with over 100 yards of chocolate, penny candy, ice cream and lifelike plush toys. Sarris' candies can be found at hundreds of annual fundraising events to kiosks in more than 500 Hallmark stores around the country.

On February 3, 2012, the factory caught fire shortly before 7AM with 20,000 pounds of chocolate but has since been restored.

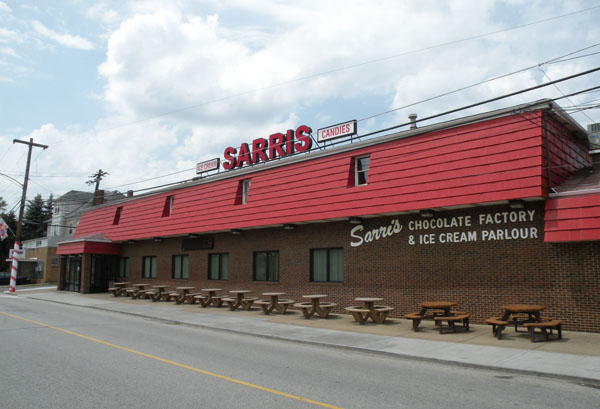
Sarris Candies Inc. in Canonsburg, Pennsylvania
