= Jerome Sarris =

Australian academic

Jerome Sarris is the Chief Scientific Officer (CSO) of Neurala Biosciences Pty Ltd (Co-CEO 2022-24) and an Executive Co-Director of the associated Not-For-Profit Psychae Institute. Neurala Biosciences (previously, Psychae Therapeutics Pty Ltd) is a biotechnology company seeded by Genesis and Tin Alley Ventures at Melbourne University. He was also appointed in the field of psychology to the position of Professor of Psychedelic Medicine at The Centre of Mental Health at Swinburne University of Technology.

He is an Honorary Enterprise Professor (Biomedical Innovation) at the Medical Faculty at the University of Melbourne, Australia, and an Adjunct Professor at NICM Health Research Institute at Western Sydney University.

Sarris' principal research interests have evolved over the years, and now primarily pertain to the development and clinical study of psychoactive medicines including psychedelic therapies for mental disorders and other diseases. He is also interested in lifestyle medicine in anxiety and mood disorders, psychotropic plant medicines (such as kava), as well as the use of pharmacogenetics to guide psychiatric treatment. He is involved in prominent research projects investigating the therapeutic potential of psychedelic medicines.

== Early life ==
Jerome Sarris was born in Sydney, Australia. He was raised on the North Shore of Sydney and attended Mosman Preparatory School. After moving to Brisbane at age 9, Sarris attended Ironside State School, then Brisbane Boys College. At age 17, Sarris lived in Glastonbury, England, for several years before returning to Brisbane to pursue further study. Sarris' heritage is primarily Austrian, German and French, and he has a great-grandmother from the Polynesian Gilbertese Islands.

== Academic career ==
Sarris has completed a Doctorate in the field of Psychiatry at the University of Queensland under the mentorship of Professors David Kavanagh and Gerard Byrne. Prior to completing postgraduate qualifications in psychology at Monash University he also completed qualifications (and practiced clinically) in the health science field, studying clinical medicine, acupuncture, and nutritional medicine, in addition to being awarded a Master’s Degree in plant-based medicine (specialising in psychoactives).

After a period of clinical practice, Sarris received a National Health and Medical Research Council (NHMRC) Early Career Fellowship where he undertook his postdoctoral training at the University of Melbourne, under the mentorship of Professor Isaac Schweitzer. His post-doctoral studies were also based at The Centre of Human Psychopharmacology with Professors Con Stough and Andrew Scholey, as well as The Depression Clinical Research program at Harvard Medicinal School with Professor David Mischoulon. Sarris held the role of Deputy and Research Director at NICM Health Research Institute before transitioning to Biotech entrepreneurial work at Neurala Biosciences.

Sarris has been listed in the top 0.1% in Stanford's World Top 2% Scientists (2024), Expertscape listed top 0.12% of Mental Health Researchers, 0.09% in Mood Disorders, being awarded the accolade of one of Australia’s Top 250 researchers (‘The Australian’ 2023 Research Awards).

== Research and scientific contributions ==
Sarris is currently involved in prominent research projects investigating the therapeutic use of psychedelic medicines (including Psilocybin and Ayahuasca) and medical cannabis. He is a principal investigator on the Global Ayahuasca Project, has published several research studies investigating the use of psychedelic medicines in psychiatric conditions, and is a founding member of the Medicinal Psychedelics Research Network at the University of Melbourne. Sarris is Chair of the Integrative and Complementary Medicine Task Force of the World Federation of Societies of Biological Psychiatry. He is also a contributing member of the European Commission's Joint Research Centre (JRC), exploring the relationship between envirome and depression.

Previously, Sarris' main research contributions have been in the areas of integrative mental health, nutritional psychiatry and in the development of evidence-based practice in naturopathy. He has co-authored a textbook, and published many highly cited papers in these fields. His work has impacted treatment guidelines for mood and anxiety disorders. Sarris has advocated for a more integrated model of treatment of depression, involving an evidence-based application of select nutraceuticals and lifestyle modification, alongside mainstream judicious use of pharmacotherapies and psychological techniques. Sarris has been a prominent figure in the investigation of South Pacific psychotropic medicinal plant kava (Piper methysticum), playing an assistance role in the direction of kava policy at the Australian Therapeutic Goods Administration. He has conducted several RCTs in anxiety and mood disorder involving extracts of this plant. His research on traditional water-extracted noble cultivars of the plant has influenced the safety guidelines around usage and development of such extracts for the treatment of anxiety.

Sarris was on the executive committee of The International Network of Integrative Mental Health, The International Society for Nutritional Psychiatry Research, and the Australian Medicinal Cannabis Research and Education Collaboration (co-founded with Justin Sinclair).
