= Canonsburg, Pennsylvania =

Borough in Pennsylvania, US

- Borough
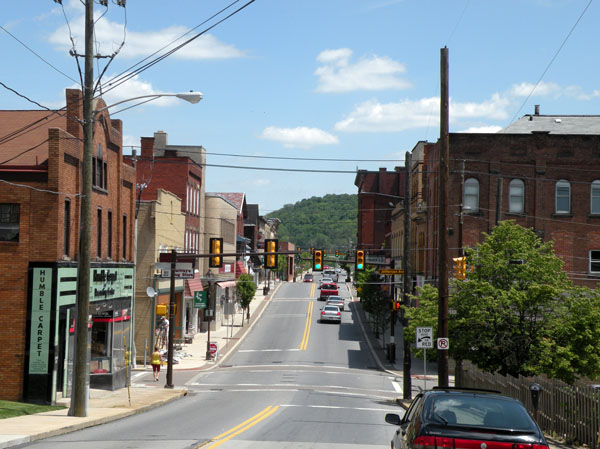
- West Pike Street near the intersection of North Jefferson Avenue
- Nickname: Guntown
- Motto: "America's Small Town Music Capital"
- Interactive map of Canonsburg, Pennsylvania
- Location within Pennsylvania Location within the United States
- Coordinates: 40°15′43″N 80°11′6″W
- Country: United States
- State: Pennsylvania
- County: Washington
- Established: 1791
- Named for: John Canon

Government
  - Mayor: David H. Rhome (D)

Area
  - Total: 2.31 sq mi (5.98 km^{2})
  - Land: 2.31 sq mi (5.98 km^{2})
  - Water: 0 sq mi (0.00 km^{2})

Population (2020)
  - Total: 9,744
  - Density: 4,218.1/sq mi (1,628.63/km^{2})
- Time zone: UTC-5 (EST)
  - Summer (DST): UTC-4 (EDT)
- ZIP code: 15317
- Area code: 724/412
- School District: Canon-McMillan
- Website: www.canonsburgboro.com

Canonsburg is a borough in Washington County, Pennsylvania, United States, 18 miles (29 km) southwest of Pittsburgh. The population was 9,735 at the 2020 census. Canonsburg was laid out by Colonel John Canon in 1789 and incorporated in 1802. The town lies in a rich coal district, and most of the town's work force once worked in local steel mills or coal mines. Interstate 79 and U.S. Route 19 pass through the town, as does the Pittsburgh and Ohio Central Railroad. A trolley used to operate from Washington, Pennsylvania to Pittsburgh through the borough until 1953.

The town is home to Sarris Candies and All-Clad Metalcrafters, makers of cookware and other bonded metals. It is adjacent to the Southpointe office park located in Cecil Township, which has a number of large corporate tenants. Yenko Chevrolet, one of largest and most notable custom muscle car shops of the late-1960s and early-1970s, was also located in Canonsburg.

The second-largest Fourth of July parade in the state of Pennsylvania, second only to Philadelphia, is held in Canonsburg. In the weeks leading up to the parade, the town frequently gains media attention for its residents setting up folding chairs along the town's main street to stake claim to prime viewing areas. Additionally, Canonsburg is host to an annual Oktoberfest. In the television series Supernatural, the town is featured in the episode "Monster Movie", which is set in the borough during the Oktoberfest celebration. However, the filming of the episode took place in Richmond, British Columbia.

== History ==
=== 18th century ===
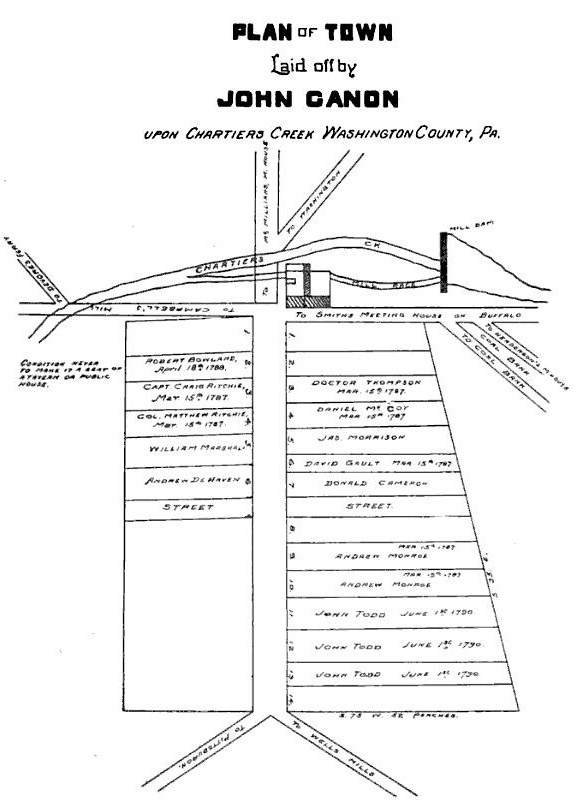
Original plots laid by Colonel John Canon

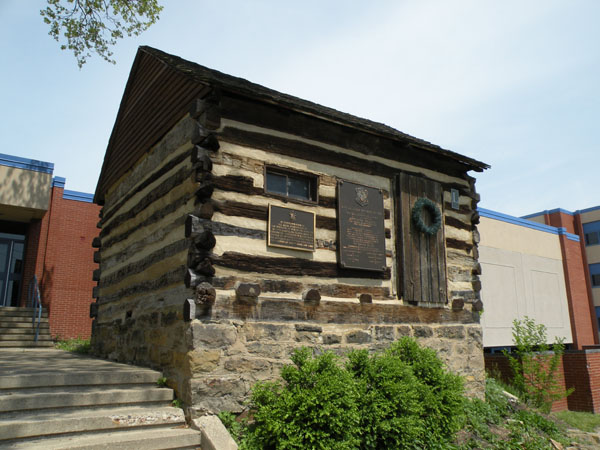
John McMillan's Log School, built in the 1780s

Sometime prior to May 1780, Colonel John Canon, a common miller who served as justice of the Virginia courts at Fort Pitt, purchased some land around Chartiers Creek from the state of Virginia. The state had claimed what is now southwestern Pennsylvania in a dispute that would not finally be settled until later in the decade. In 1781 Pennsylvania carved Washington County out of Westmoreland County, and the county seat was established at Washington. The notes of the first session of the Washington County Court during that year indicate a call for a road from Canon's mill to Pittsburgh. The road to Pittsburgh, called Pitt Street, remains in part today as an archaic and indirect route to the city. The first surviving plat of the town is from April 15, 1788. Lots were sold around Canon's property, and the emerging town took the name of Canonsburg shortly thereafter.

Many of the participants in the Whiskey Rebellion in July 1794 were residents of present-day Washington County, which includes Canonsburg. Some of the insurrectionists are believed to have gathered in the town's Black Horse Tavern. However, records do not indicate whether any Canonsburg residents participated in any of the violent acts which occurred during the rebellion.

=== 19th century ===
The town was the site of the first institution of higher learning west of the Allegheny Mountains, Jefferson College. Founded in 1802, it was the eleventh such institution in the United States. The Phi Gamma Delta and Phi Kappa Psi fraternities were both founded at Jefferson College. Phi Gamma Delta, of whom President Calvin Coolidge was a member, was founded in 1848. Phi Kappa Psi, of whom President Woodrow Wilson and over 100 U.S. Congressmen claim membership, was founded in 1852. The school would go on to become Washington & Jefferson College in nearby Washington.

For generations, Jefferson College financially supported Canonsburg by accounting for much of its income. In 1868, however, the college was moved to nearby Washington, leaving behind empty college rooming and boarding houses, known as the "forts". Canonsburg's largest financial draw having left, it would take the introduction of the railroad system to return the city to its former glory. The railroad system, on its way from Mansfield (Carnegie) to Washington (See: Chartiers Branch), was fully operational, as scheduled, on May 18, 1871. The first scheduled train departed from the Washington depot carrying "borough authorities, the committee of arrangement and reception, as well as Rankin's Cornet Band and a number of...prominent citizens who had been invited to join the excursion." They traveled to Mansfield, where they waited for the special to arrive from Pittsburgh. The special had 12 coaches pulled by two locomotives and was filled with a large number of dignitaries, most especially the mayors of Pittsburgh and Allegheny. The special then made it down the newly laid tracks, passing stations full of spectators to cheer on the train. Canonsburg had a large crowd of supporters, and many people climbed aboard the train to ride along to Washington. There, led by Pittsburgh's Great Western Band, the crowd marched to Town Hall for a round of speeches. The Washington Reporter editor pronounced the day "a grand success."

=== 20th century ===
In 1903, the Washington and Canonsburg Railway Company linked the two towns with a trolley line. The company was bought by the Philadelphia Company in 1906, later becoming part of the Pittsburgh Railway Company, linking through to Pittsburgh as part of their interurban service in 1909. The line closed on August 29, 1953, with the last three trolley cars travelling south through Canonsburg to the Pennsylvania Trolley Museum in 1954 shortly before the track was removed.

In 1911, South Canonsburg was annexed. On August 26, 1911, 26 people were killed in the Canonsburg Opera House disaster. A false shout of "fire" triggered a panic that killed twenty-six people.

The Canonsburg Armory, Hawthorne School and Roberts House are listed on the National Register of Historic Places.

The Standard Chemical Company operated a radium refining mill from 1911 to 1922 on a 19-acre (77,000 m^{2}) plot of land. From 1930 to 1942, the company purified uranium ore. Marie Curie was invited to the United States in 1921 and was given an honorary degree by the University of Pittsburgh, and one gram of radium.

From 1942 to 1957, Vitro Manufacturing Company refined uranium and other rare metals from various ores and onsite residues, government-owned uranium ore, process concentrates, and scrap materials. The government bought the uranium ore from Vitro and used it in the Manhattan Project. Waste from incomplete extraction and other metallurgical processes accumulated during the site's long history. About 11,600 tons of mill tailings were moved to railroad property near Blairsville between 1956 and 1957. After the closure of Vitro, the site was used by the U.S. Atomic Energy Commission. The site was then used by the Canonsburg Pottery Company, operated by the George Family, for land and clay.

The Canonsburg mill site was designated in the 1978 Uranium Mill Tailings Radiation Control Act as eligible for federal funds for clean up. It was the only uranium mill east of the Mississippi River to receive funds. In a $48 million cleanup project, the mill site and 163 nearby properties in Canonsburg were remediated. Residual radioactivity was consolidated into a covered, clay-lined cell at the Canonsburg mill site, which is fenced and posted.

== Geography ==
Canonsburg is located at 40°15′43″N 80°11′6″W (40.262012, −80.185030).

According to the U.S. Census Bureau, the borough has a total area of 2.3 square miles (6.0 km^{2}), all land. Canonsburg Lake, a recreational lake, lies directly east of the town.

Canonsburg has four borders, including Cecil Township to the north and northeast, North Strabane Township to the east and south, Houston to the southwest, and Chartiers Township to the west and northwest.

== Demographics ==
Historical population
Census	Pop.	Note	%±
1820	440		—
1830	792		80.0%
1840	687		−13.3%
1850	627		−8.7%
1860	650		3.7%
1870	641		−1.4%
1880	699		9.0%
1890	2,113		202.3%
1900	2,714		28.4%
1910	3,891		43.4%
1920	10,632		173.2%
1930	12,558		18.1%
1940	12,599		0.3%
1950	12,072		−4.2%
1960	11,877		−1.6%
1970	11,439		−3.7%
1980	10,459		−8.6%
1990	9,200		−12.0%
2000	8,607		−6.4%
2010	8,992		4.5%
2020	9,744		8.4%
2025 (est.)	9,529	▼	−2.2%

As of the 2010 census, there were 8,992 people, 3,809 households, and 2,285 families residing in the borough. The population density was 3,703.5 inhabitants per square mile (1,429.9/km^{2}). There were 4,144 housing units at an average density of 1,783.1 per square mile (688.5/km^{2}). The racial makeup of the borough was 91.01% White, 6.53% African American, 0.06% Native American, 0.64% Asian, 0.08% Pacific Islander, 0.19% from other races, and 1.50% from two or more races. Hispanic or Latino of any race were 0.72% of the population.

There were 3,809 households, out of which 23.6% had children under the age of 18 living with them, 43.6% were married couples living together, 12.8% had a female householder with no husband present, and 40.0% were non-families. 34.9% of all households were made up of individuals, and 17.2% had someone living alone who was 65 years of age or older. The average household size was 2.23 and the average family size was 2.88.

The population distribution by age was 20.3% under the age of 18, 7.1% from 18 to 24, 28.2% from 25 to 44, 22.9% from 45 to 64, and 21.5% who were 65 years of age or older. The median age was 42 years. For every 100 females, there were 87.4 males. For every 100 females age 18 and over, there were 83.8 males.

The median income for a household in the borough was $31,184, and the median income for a family was $42,793. Males had a median income of $32,458 versus $22,733 for females. The per capita income for the borough was $17,469. About 5.8% of families and 8.9% of the population were below the poverty line, including 14.5% of those under age 18 and 6.6% of those age 65 or over.

== Culture ==
=== Fourth of July Parade ===
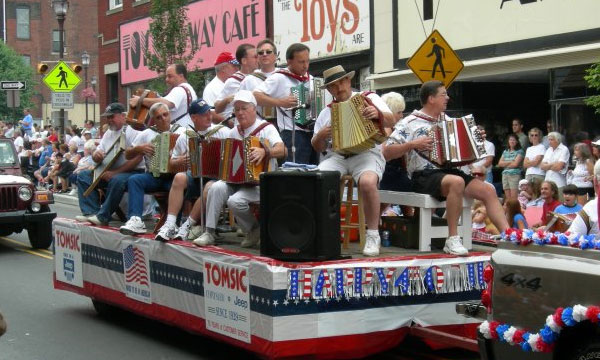
Pike Street in the Canonsburg Fourth of July parade

The Canonsburg Fourth of July Parade is a parade through Canonsburg celebrating Independence Day. It is the second-largest Fourth of July parade in Pennsylvania, second only to Philadelphia, despite Canonsburg having only 9,744 residents. 50,000 to 60,000 people usually attend. The parade starts on Morganza Road and runs down the length of Pike Street, heading westward, for approximately 1.5 miles.

The parade begins at 10:00 am on the Fourth of July. Parade members include high school and other marching bands from Washington County and the surrounding areas, local sports teams and cheerleaders of all ages, fire trucks, emergency responders, shriners, unicyclists, jugglers, pipers, polka bands, various church groups, members of the VFW, local politicians, and the mayor of Canonsburg. Some groups throw candy to the children along the parade route, and others pass out water bottles.

After the parade, the day's festivities continue with food, concerts, events in Canonsburg Town Park, and family entertainment throughout the day. The day ends with fireworks launched near Canon-McMillan Memorial Stadium.

The parade is perhaps regionally best known for the long-standing tradition of enthusiasts placing chairs, benches, and beach chairs along the parade route to reserve their seats, sometimes a week or more ahead of the parade. This has caused controversy among some residents and business owners, but the tradition continues to this day. The seat saving ritual has attracted the attention of CNN, Jay Leno, and David Letterman.

=== Black Horse Tavern ===
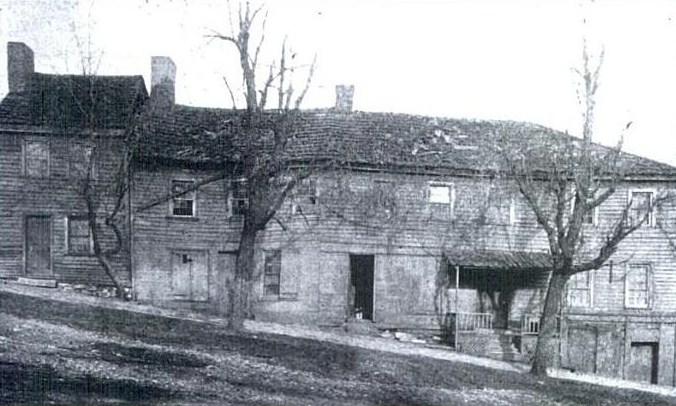
Black Horse Tavern

Black Horse Tavern was founded in 1794, on the road between Budd's Ferry on the Youghiogheny River to McFarlen's Ferry on Monongahela River. Some sources identify the Black Horse Tavern as the birthplace of the Whiskey Rebellion. Other sources are less certain on the role of the tavern in the rebellion, ascribing the tavern's prominent role in the Whiskey Rebellion to "local tradition." By 1795, a "nailing business" was started at the location. In 1910, the remains of the tavern were removed to make room for the new Canonsburg High School.

== Education ==
It is in the Canon-McMillan School District.

== Notable people ==
- Bob Baker, boxer
- John Canon, Founder of Canonsburg
- Perry Como, popular singer and television personality, recipient of Grammy Lifetime Achievement Award (2002)
- All four members of the 1950s-1960s pop vocal group The Four Coins.
- Robert Patterson Hughes, U.S. Army major general
- Mike Hull, NFL linebacker for Miami Dolphins
- H. Ross Hume, distance runner, one of "dead heat twins"
- Robert H. Hume, distance runner, brother of H. Ross Hume
- Hal Hunter, football coach
- Welcome Turner Jones, physician and first African American graduate of Washington & Jefferson College
- Wiz Khalifa, rapper
- Doug Kotar, NFL running back for New York Giants
- Jonathan Letterman, Civil War era military surgeon, pioneered field ambulance technique.
- Delvin Miller, original owner of Meadowcroft Rockshelter, Neolithic native American cave site, and founder of "the Meadows" Harness Horse Race Track
- Demi Moore, actress
- Dorian O'Daniel, NFL Linebacker for Kansas City Chiefs and member of the national champion 2016 Clemson Tigers football team
- Bill Schmidt, Olympic bronze medalist in javelin at Munich Olympics in 1972, national champion 1978, World Military champion and record holder
- Marty Schottenheimer, NFL football coach
- Bobby Vinton, pop singer and recording artist
- Donald Yenko, racer driver, creator of Yenko Camaro at Yenko Chevrolet

== Gallery ==
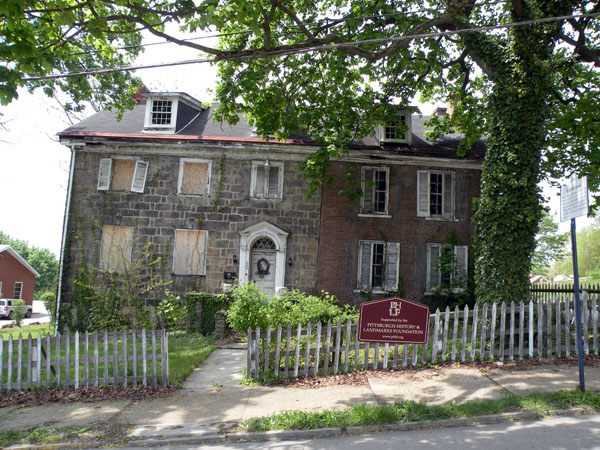
Roberts House, built between 1802 and 1808, at 225 North Central Avenue.

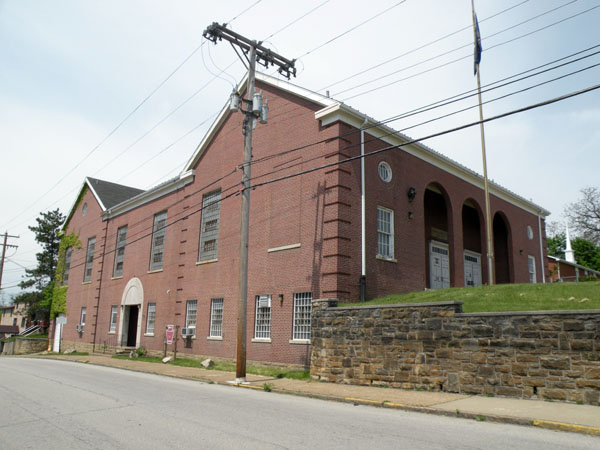
Canonsburg Armory, built in 1938, at West College Street and North Central Avenue.

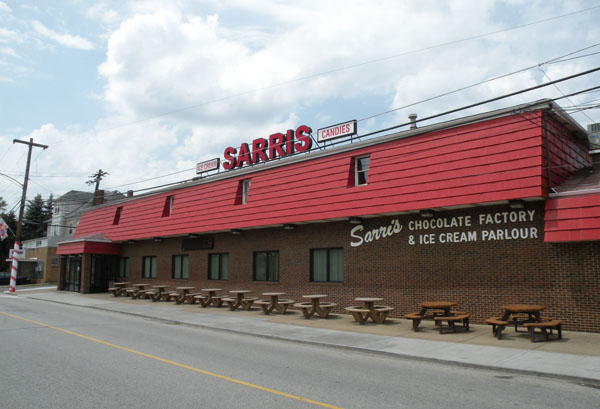
Sarris Candies Inc. store located at 511 Adams Avenue.
