= John McMillan (missionary) =

American missionary (1752–1833)

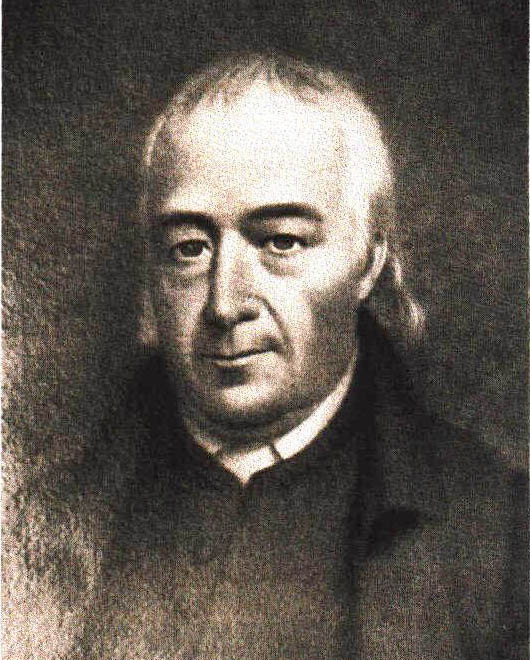
- McMillan in the 1820s
- Born: November 11, 1752; Fagg's Manor, Pennsylvania
- Died: November 16, 1833 (aged 81); Canonsburg, Pennsylvania
- Spouse: Catherine (Brown) McMillan
- Church: Presbyterian

John McMillan (November 11, 1752 – November 16, 1833) was a prominent Presbyterian minister and missionary in Western Pennsylvania when that area was part of the American Frontier. He founded the first school west of the Allegheny Mountains, which is now known as John McMillan's Log School. He is one of the founders of Washington & Jefferson College.

== Biography ==
McMillan was born on November 11, 1752, in Fagg's Manor, Chester County, Pennsylvania. His Scots-Irish parents (William McMillan & Margaret Rea) arrived in Chester County from County Antrim, Ireland, in 1742. McMillan attended Blair's grammar school in Fagg's Manor and studied theology at Robert Smith's Pequea Academy He entered Princeton at 18 and graduated in 1772. It was at Princeton that he declared "that the divine law was not only holy and just but that it was also good and that conformity to it would make me happy."

He was licensed to preach at age 22 in East Nottingham, Pennsylvania, under the Presbytery of Newcastle. He traveled west on foot in 1775, preaching along the way. On 6 August 1776 he married Catherine Brown (daughter of William Brown) of Chester County. He founded Pigeon Creek Church, where he served for 19 years, Chartiers Church, where he served for 47 years and spent eight years with Matthew Brown.

Amid the Revolutionary War and attacks from local Indians, McMillan moved his wife and their first child to a cabin on Shanon Run, the east branch of Chartiers Creek in Washington County, Pennsylvania. McMillan began teaching Greek and Latin to students in his log cabin, eventually graduating several prominent frontier ministers, including James McGready, William Swann, Samuel Porter, and Thomas Marquis. The precise date of the beginning of instruction is unknown.

McMillan was described as large man, with a height of 6 foot and weighing 200 pounds in his middle age. His voice was described as strong and "swarthy". He was a Federalist and opposed the Whiskey Rebellion. He nominated Albert Gallatin for congress. Gallatin's successor, James Ross was a classical teacher at McMillan's log college. McMillan served in the militia in Captain James Scott's Company of the Third Battalion of the Washington County Military. He was ordered to duty on May 8, 1782, and received "donation farm" in Mercer County from the government for his service. He was related to Captain William Fife who was a captain during the Revolutionary War from western Pennsylvania.

McMillan and Rev. Matthew Henderson collected money to build the Canonsburg Academy in Canonsburg, Pennsylvania, and transferred his log cabin students there. He is also considered a founder of the Pittsburgh Academy (later University of Pittsburgh) as well as the Pittsburgh Xenia Theological Seminary and the Western Theological Seminary. All told, he educated over 100 ministers and preached 6,000 sermons. James Carnahan, President of Princeton University, said that he had aided church and education "more than any other man of his generation."

== Legacy ==
In 1949, the Pennsylvania Historical and Museum Commission installed a historical marker on U.S. Route 19, near Pennsylvania Route 519, south of Canonsburg noting McMillan's historic importance. In 1949, the Pennsylvania Historical and Museum Commission placed a marker adjacent to Hill Church and in 1951, adjacent to Bethel Presbyterian Church, both churches founded by McMillan. He is survived by thousands of living descendants, many of whom are members of the Rev. Dr. John McMillan association of descendants. The group has held a reunion every two to three years since 1902.

== See also ==
- John McMillan's Log School
- McMillan Hall

== Works ==
- McMillan, D.D., John (June 1833). Rev. S.C. Jennings (ed.). "Sermon XVI: The Moral Law Established By Faith in the Law". The Presbyterian Preacher. II (3). Pittsburgh: D. and M. MacLean: 225–240.
- McMillan, D.D., John (June 1833). Rev. S.C. Jennings (ed.). "Sermon XXII: The Sinner's Inability Inexcusable, Yet Divine Influence Necessary". The Presbyterian Preacher. II (8). Pittsburgh: D. and M. MacLean: 305–316.
