= Chartiers-Houston School District =

School district in Pennsylvania, US

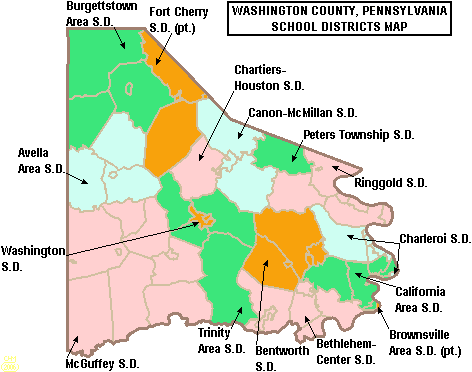

Address
- 2020 West Pike Street Houston, Washington, Pennsylvania, 15342; United States

District information
- Type: Public
- Motto: "Home of the Buccaneers"
- Grades: K–12
- Established: 1955; 70 years ago
- President: Shelly Brose
- Superintendent: Dr. Gary Peiffer
- Budget: $15,384,435 (2009-2010)
- NCES District ID: 4205730

Students and staff
- Enrollment: 1,260 (2023–2024)
- Student–teacher ratio: 14.43
- Athletic conference: WPIAL PIAA
- District mascot: Buccaneers
- Colors: Maroon and Gold

Other information
- Website: www.chbucs.k12.pa.us

The Chartiers-Houston School District covers the Borough of Houston and Chartiers Township in Washington County, Pennsylvania. The district operates Chartiers-Houston Jr/Sr High School (7th–12th) and Allison Park Elementary School (K–6th). Named for Peter Chartier (1690–1759), who established a trading post in the area in 1743.
