= John Canon =

- Born: September 11th 1726
- Died: November 6, 1798 (aged 72)
- Known for: Founder of Canonsburg, Pennsylvania

John Canon (generally referred to as Colonel John Canon) (September 11, 1726 – November 6, 1798) was an American Revolutionary soldier, miller, judge, and businessman, who founded three towns, including Canonsburg, Pennsylvania, which bears his name.

== Early history ==
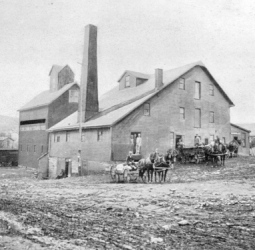
Canon's mill

John Canon was one of the first settlers in Chartiers Valley, a tributary of the Ohio River. He worked as a rent collector for George Washington, who owned a large amount of land in the area. On November 30, 1786 George Washington appointed John Canon Power of attorney as his agent for the management of Washington's property on Millers Run in Washington County, Pennsylvania. At the time, the area was claimed by both Pennsylvania and Virginia. In 1773, Canon acquired 12 acres (4.9 ha) of land along the Chartiers Creek on the Catfish Path, where he built a gristmill and started a farm. In January 1774, he was appointed viewer of a road from Thomas Gist's in Mount Braddock to Paul Froman's mill on Chartiers Creek. He was appointed by Lord Dunmore to serve as judge in Augusta County. After the border dispute between Pennsylvania and Virginia, the area was placed in Yohogania County.

== Military service ==
In 1775, he was named a colonel in the Washington County militia during the American Revolutionary War. He was made sub-lieutenant of the county and participated in a number of Indian expeditions, including the Crawford expeditions. It is not clear whether he participated in some of the more brutal raids, as is claimed by some historical accounts. Some evidence exists that indicate that he was in Philadelphia, serving in the Pennsylvania Provincial Assembly.

== Civic accomplishments ==
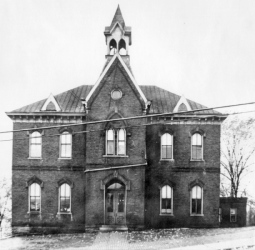
Stone College Building, constructed by Canon

In 1780, he received land in Virginia along the Chartiers Valley through present-day Canonsburg on the north side of Chartiers Creek. In that land, he founded three towns, "Canon Hill" (now Canonsburg, founded April 15, 1788), "Abbington," and "Sugar-Tree Grove." He owned an early flour mill and saw mill that formed the basis of the town. It was water-powered and was erected in 1780. The mill was demolished in 1942 when the milling company ceased flour production.

He was a member of the Board of Trustees of Washington Academy, an academy that would eventually merge with the institution he helped found, from 1789 until his death in 1798. In 1791, he helped found Canonsburg Academy, which would later become Jefferson College and Washington & Jefferson College, by donating a plot of land in Canonsburg and constructing the Stone Academy Building.

== Personal life ==
Canon had five children, Abigail, William, Jane, Joshua, and John, Jr., by his first wife and three children, Samuel, Margaret, and Ann, by his second wife. He died on November 6, 1798.

== Gallery ==
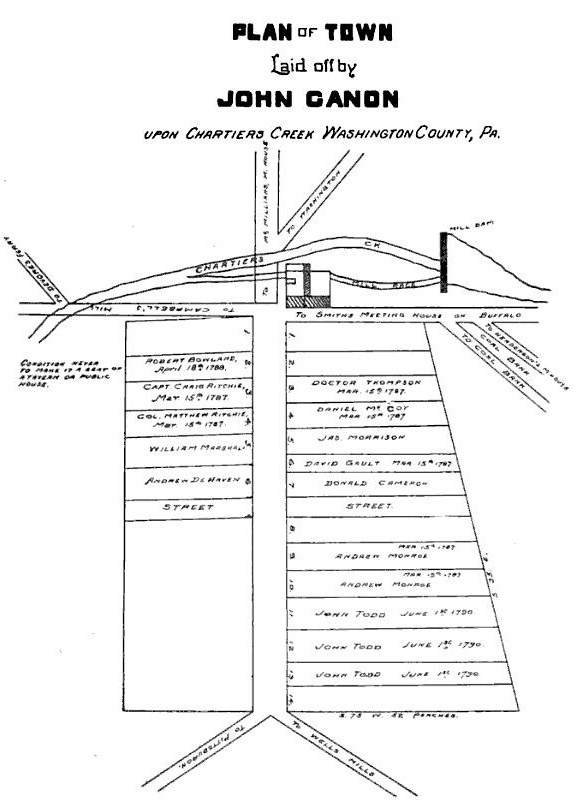
Canonsburg, as laid out by Col. Canon
