= Poffenbarger =

Notable persons with the last name Poffenbarger include:

- George Poffenbarger (1861–1951), justice of the West Virginia Supreme Court
- Livia Simpson Poffenbarger (1862–1937), newspaper editor/owner, historian, social and political activist and wife of George Poffenbarger
- Saylor Poffenbarger (born 2003), American basketball player

Notable persons with variants of the name:

- Albert Poffenberger (1885–1977), American psychologist
- Boots Poffenberger (1915–1999), American baseball pitcher
- Virginia Poffenberger (1934–2013), American politician from Iowa

== See also ==
- Poffenberger Road Bridge, in Maryland, United States
