= Charles Page Thomas Moore =

American judge

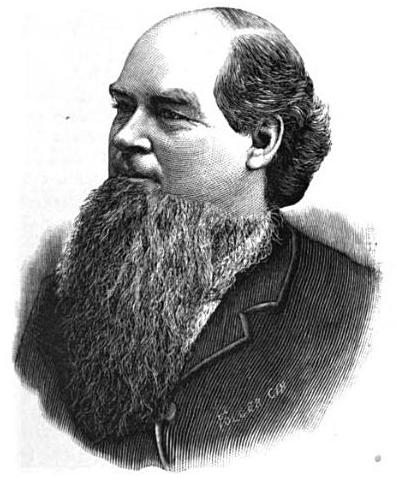

Judge West Virginia Court of Appeals
- In office Jan. 1, 1871 – June 1, 1881
- Preceded by: James H. Brown
- Succeeded by: James French Patton

Personal details
- Born: February 8, 1831 Lewisburg, Virginia, US
- Died: July 7, 1904 (aged 73) Gallipolis Ferry, West Virginia, US
- Party: Democratic
- Education: Jefferson College; Union College; University of Virginia
- Profession: Politician, lawyer, judge
- Known for: Founded Phi Kappa Psi with William Henry Letterman

Charles Page Thomas Moore (February 8, 1831 – July 7, 1904) was a lawyer and justice of the West Virginia Supreme Court of Appeals, who before the American Civil War had helped found the Phi Kappa Psi fraternity in 1852 at Jefferson College (now Washington and Jefferson College) in Canonsburg, Pennsylvania.

== Early and family life ==
He was born in Lewisburg, Virginia, in a portion of the state along the Ohio River which became West Virginia in his lifetime. His father had been born in Shenandoah County and moved across the Appalachian Mountains to the Greenbrier County area, but died when Charles was an infant. His paternal grandfather had married a daughter of Joseph Morgan, who helped settle the trans-Appalachian area. His mother, Augusta Delphia Page of Staunton, Virginia, a daughter of Major Charles Page, died in 1844 so Charles and his sister were raised by their uncle, George Moore in Mason County. When Charles was 16, he was sent to Marshall Academy in Huntington, and he would also study with John I Van Meter in Pike County, Pennsylvania, then attend Jefferson College (which later became Washington and Jefferson College) in Canonsburg, Pennsylvania. While at Jefferson College, Charles Moore helped found the Phi Kappa Psi fraternity before graduating in 1853. Moore then briefly attended Union College in New York. Returning to Virginia, he studied law at the University of Virginia and completed the course in 1856.

He married Urilla Katherine Kline of Hagerstown, Maryland, and they had four daughters: Ida Ogden Moore (1867–1948), Rebecca Francis Moore Bland (1870–1967), Mai L Moore (1873–1965) and Elizabeth Van Meter Moore (1874–1948).

== Career ==
Admitted to the Virginia bar, Moore established his legal practice at Point Pleasant along the Ohio River near his foster father's farm. In 1860 he won election as the Commonwealth's attorney for Mason County. At various times he had legal partnerships with Nicholas Fitzhugh, James H. Couch and William Tomlinson.

After former Confederates were again allowed to hold office, Moore defeated Republican James F. Brown in 1870. He sat as a judge in the first session of the West Virginia Supreme Court of Appeals in 1870. Two years later, West Virginia adopted a new state Constitution, thereby cutting short all the terms of the three-judge court. Moore was a nominee of both parties in 1872 and among the five judges elected to the new Virginia Supreme Court of Appeals. He wrote and delivered 107 opinions before resigning in May 1881. His successor, Richmond-born James French Patton, a fellow Democrat, had been a former Confederate officer. However, in 1888, fellow Mason County lawyer John W. English would be elected to the West Virginia Supreme Court, then George Poffenbarger.

== Death and legacy ==
Moore died at Gallipolis Ferry, West Virginia in 1904.
