= William Henry Letterman =

American physician

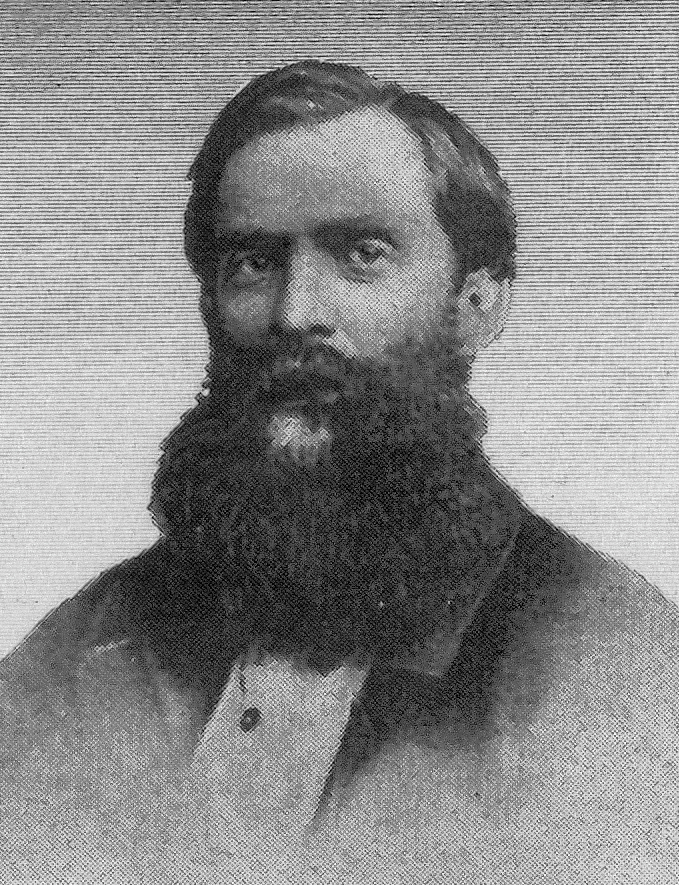
- Born: August 12, 1832; Canonsburg, Pennsylvania
- Died: May 23, 1881 (aged 48); Duffau, Texas
- Resting place: Duffau Cemetery; 32.0644°N 98.0078°W
- Education: Jefferson College (1853); Jefferson Medical College (1856)
- Occupation: Physician
- Known for: Co-founded Phi Kappa Psi with Charles Page Thomas Moore
- Spouse: Laura Letterman
- Relatives: Jonathan K. Letterman (brother)

William Henry Letterman (August 12, 1832 – May 23, 1881) was the co-founder of the Phi Kappa Psi fraternity in 1852 at Jefferson College in Canonsburg, Pennsylvania.

== Early life and education ==
Letterman was born in Canonsburg. He graduated from Jefferson College (now Washington and Jefferson College) and then went on to receive his M.D. from Jefferson Medical College in 1856, where he was president of his graduating class.

== Family ==
His father was the physician to the town of Canonsburg and died early in William's life.

He is the younger brother of Jonathan K. Letterman who is known as the "father of battlefield medicine". His system enabled thousands of wounded men to be recovered and treated during the American Civil War.

== Phi Kappa Psi ==
Letterman and his mother were living just a few houses away from Jefferson College. In the winter of 1850–1851, a typhoid fever epidemic broke out in the area and William and his friend, Charles Page Thomas Moore, spent long nights caring for a sick friend. Letterman and Moore grew to appreciate their service, and decided to form an organization that would ensconce these ideals. On the night of February 19, 1852, the brotherhood of Phi Kappa Psi was born.

== Freemason ==
On January 17, 1868, Letterman received his Freemasons (Masons) apprentice degree from Concordia Lodge #13 in Baltimore, Maryland. He also helped to organize the Masonic Lodge, in Duffau, Texas.

== Life and death ==
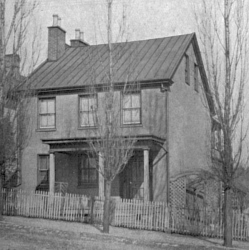
Letterman's home in Canonsburg, Pennsylvania.

In the late fall of 1875, Letterman went to Prairie Home, Missouri, because of continued poor health and remained there for about three years. Then he decided the climate in Texas would be advantageous, so in the spring of 1878 he made a two-month tour to that state.

In November, 1878, with his wife and baby daughter, Laura, he left Missouri for Dallas, Texas, and then went to Stephenville, Texas by stage coach. He stopped at the Texas Hotel and the following day he hired a carriage and arrived at Duffau, Erath County, that afternoon.

At Duffau there were some mineral wells, and he had been told that the railroad would be built through Duffau, westward. However, the railroad was constructed through Hico and Stephenville. When he went to Texas, he carried letters of introduction signed by many prominent men of the East.

He helped organize a county medical association and also a district medical association in Stephenville, and he was elected the first president. He was a member of the Northwest Texas Medical and Surgical Society. He was examined and given a certificate to practice by M. S. Crow, M.D., chairman of the board of medical examiners, Erath County, Texas, and this was recorded on the twenty-seventh of November, 1878, at the office in Stephenville by W. H. Fooshea.

His health grew worse, and he was advised to make a trip to the Gulf. In a covered wagon, with his brother Ritchie as driver and with his wife and two children riding nearby in a buggy, he set out from Duffau on May 15, 1881. Because he grew worse daily, all were compelled to return within a week. Before he turned back, he stayed for a short while at the home of a friend in what is now downtown Austin. The historical site is presently part of 6th street's bar district. While the upstairs loft where Letterman spent his last days has held many merchants during the last century, it is currently a bar named Peckerheads. A small shrine in Letterman's honor exists there today. He died on May 23, 1881, and was buried in the cemetery at Duffau.

The Revered Mrs. Hugart conducted services at the church, and Mr. Franks conducted the Masonic service. Mrs. Letterman sold a riding pony, which her husband had given her, and had a monument placed at his grave. This monument still stands. Shortly after Letterman's death, his widow and children returned to the home of Mrs. Letterman's father, Professor Slaughter, in Missouri.

The last lines Letterman wrote were these:

Dear Sir (Prof. Slaughter)

Today I am used up right sharp—does not express my case too strong. At all events after careful advice, I leave tomorrow, closing the housing and go direct to the Gulf at the mouth of Rio Grande del Norte. This is 400 miles from here. We go through Lampas, thence to Austin, then to the mouth of River, then we rest for 2 or 3 weeks rolling in salt water, then we make a bee line for San Antonio, Laredo, and return home if well. If not well, keep agoing. I will close. Your next, if this is answered, you will direct to Austin. Good-by.

Love to all,

W. H. Letterman
