= DeWitt H. Fessenden =

American architect

- Born: 1885
- Died: after 1952
- Education: Cornell University
- Occupation: Architect

DeWitt Harvey Fessenden (1885 – after 1952) was an American architect, critic, sketch artist, and author of The Life and Works of Claude Deruet (1952). He received a bachelor's degree in architecture from Cornell University.

== Biography ==
DeWitt Fessenden’s father was Harvey George Fessenden (July 26, 1844–Feb. 19, 1901) of Ithaca, New York. Harvey married Isabelle Tichenor Atwater (Sept. 26, 1850–May 10, 1937) of Van Eltenville, New York. The wedding was at Waverly, New York. The roots of the Fessenden family lay in Chilam, Kent, England. They were Puritans, arriving at Cambridge, Massachusetts sometime before 1677. Dewitt’s great-great-grandfather was born in Franklin, Connecticut and emigrated into northeastern Pennsylvania when that territory was claimed by Hartford. The Fessendens settled at South Montrose, Pennsylvania and married into the Lathrops of Bridgewater, Susquehanna, Pennsylvania. Harvey’s great-grandfather moved the family into the Ithaca valley sometime before 1839, settling at the village of Candor, New York. When Fessenden arrived at Cornell, he joined the New York Alpha chapter of Phi Kappa Psi. Fessenden was among the members of this fraternity that rendered comfort to dying members of Chi Psi when that group's lodge caught on fire. He was also a member of the Irving Literary Society. Fessenden joined the freshman baseball team, and was considered part of a strong infield.

Academically, Fessenden worked from Samuel F.B. Morse Hall, now the site of the Johnson Museum of Art, in a bachelors’ architecture program known for its practical exercises.

== Writing ==
Within a decade of graduating from Cornell, DeWitt’s work as an architect gained regional notice. As the Cornell Daily Sun noted,

D. H. Fessenden '05, architect and etcher, has been spoken of in the April issue of the International Studio, as a "serious etcher who is plodding along the difficult road to success and not trying to cut corners by eccentric methods."

Fessenden after leaving Cornell traveled considerably in France and Italy, where he made a special study of the old churches and cathedrals. The International Studio says:

"Mr. Fessenden grasps essentials, is a capital draughtsman and handles his etching needle with great sensitiveness."

Fessenden lived at the Cornell Club, 145 Madison Avenue, New York, New York during the 1930s.

== Published works ==
For both marketing purposes and as a means of expressing his artistic interests, Fessenden began to write professionally after he graduated. Generally, his architectural designs and later writings showed an understanding of the discipline that urban and suburban living would require of an industrialized society. But he was also very conscious of the need to use design to define one’s own space, separate from the outside world. He adored “high style”, trying to bring its essence down to scale for the average homeowner. In December 1914, The International Studio published Fessenden's sketches of Rheims Cathedral; In 1922, the Architectural Record featured Fessenden’s art work.

=== Magazines and journals ===
Fessenden's work was published in the magazines Good Housekeeping, House & Garden, The International Studio, and Architectural Record.

By 1937, DeWitt was working in the architectural trade press, notably with Sketch Book Magazine. Among DeWitt’s writings in Sketch Bookwas the “Pageant of French Architecture”.

=== Books ===
Fessenden's sole published book was an architectural professional's biography of his favorite artist, Claude Deruet. The Life and Works of Claude Deruet was published late in Fessenden's life, and is now included among the Rare Books departments of academic libraries.

- Fessenden, DeWitt H. (1952). The Life and Works of Claude Deruet: court painter, 1588–1660. Brooklyn. ASIN B0006ATLM2. LCCN 53015220.
