= James H. Brown (judge) =

American judge (1818–1900)

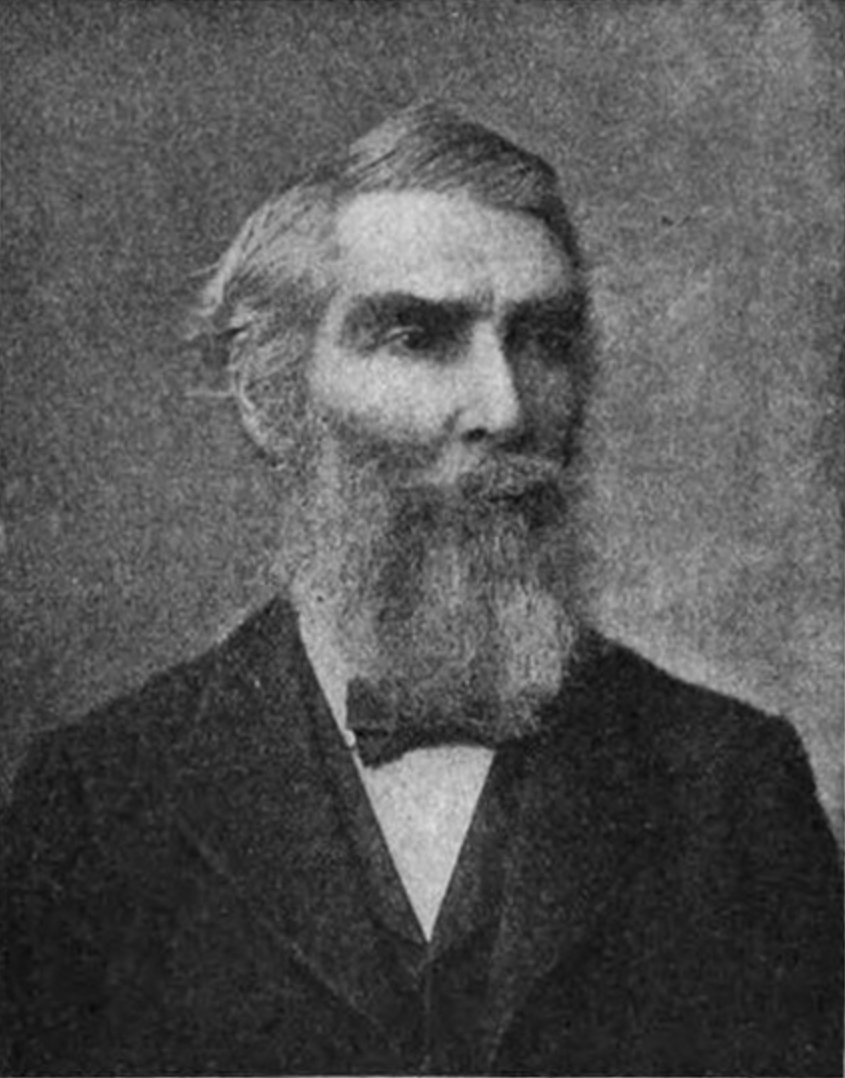
Judge James H. Brown

James Henry Brown (December 25, 1818 – October 28, 1900) was a justice of the Supreme Court of Appeals of West Virginia from June 20, 1863 to December 31, 1870.

== Early life, education, and career ==
Born in Cabell County, Virginia, Brown was of English ancestry, and was the son of Virginia native Benjamin Brown, and North Carolina native Matilda Scales Brown, who was the daughter of Major Nathaniel Scales. Brown attended Marietta College in Ohio, and also Augusta College in Kentucky, where he graduated in 1840. He read law under Cabell County attorney John Laidley, and began his own practice of law in his native county in 1843, and later practiced in other parts of the State. He moved to Charleston, Virginia in 1848.

== Political and judicial career ==
In 1854, Brown was a delegate to the Virginia State Democratic Convention at Staunton that nominated Henry A. Wise for Governor, Brown was a delegate to the Wheeling Convention in 1861 that prevented the western portion of Virginia from seceding during the American Civil War, and took an active part in the formation of the state of West Virginia as a member of most of the conventions looking to the formation of the state. He was elected to the legislature of Virginia on May 23, 1861, from Kanawha County, "in the midst of turmoil in a divided country", and "attended many meetings when his hearers were armed for protection".

In the winter of 1861-1862 he was elected and commissioned judge of the 18th judicial circuit of Virginia. While acting in this capacity the records of his courts were, in many counties, as fast as they were made, captured and destroyed, and on several occasions he narrowly escaped the repeated efforts to capture the court. As a judge he was "courteous, firm and fearless, and no appeal was ever taken from his decision as circuit judge".

In 1863, he was elected to the convention that framed a constitution for the new state and later in that year was elected Judge of the newly-established Supreme Court of Appeals. By this point, Brown had become a Republican due to the progression of the war. On the Supreme Court he exhibited the same qualities as on the bench of the lower court. He was twice a candidate for Congress, but his district was strongly Democratic and he was defeated. He was elected to another term in the state legislature in 1882, which was his last public office. He retired from the practice of law in the 1890s, after half a century in practice.

== Personal life ==
In 1844 he married Miss Louisa Beuhring, with whom he had "a large and talented family". His son, James F. Brown, became "one of the leading lawyers of the State". Brown was a Presbyterian, and was long "an elder in that church".

Brown died at his home in Charleston, West Virginia at the age of 82, after a short sickness.

Political offices
Preceded by Newly established court.	Justice of the Supreme Court of Appeals of West Virginia; 1863–1870	Succeeded by Charles Page Thomas Moore
