= Friedrich Brentel =

German painter

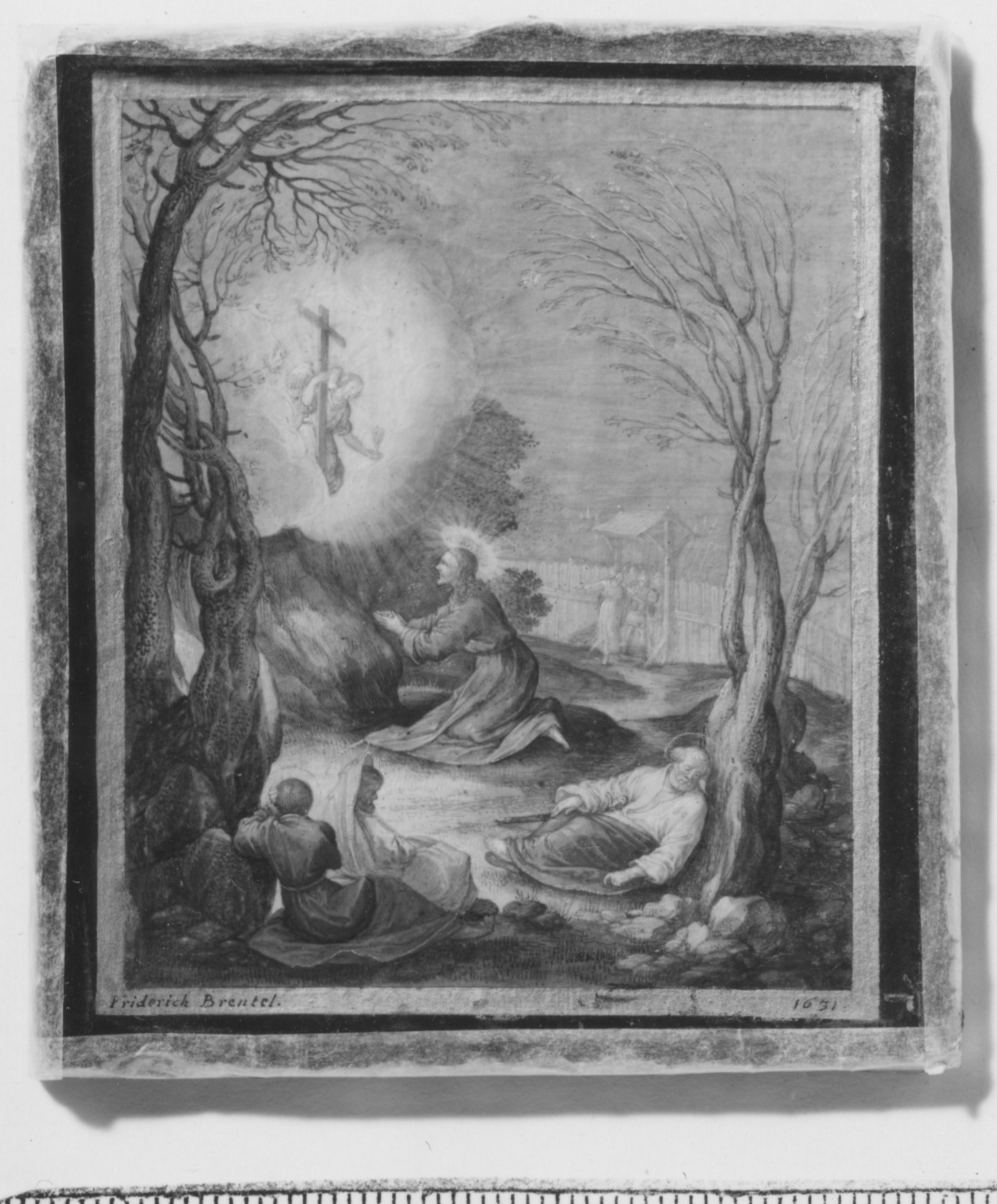
Scenes from the life of Christ by Friedrich Brentel (1631)

Friedrich Brentel (1580–1651) was a German printmaker in engraving and etching, and miniature painter. He was born in Lauingen and became a citizen of Strasbourg in 1601. His principal work is a set of plates for The Funeral of Charles III, Duke of Lorraine and the Royal entry of his son as the new duke, published at Nancy in 1611. They are from the designs of Claude de La Ruelle and Jean La Hire, and are etched in a slight, spirited manner. One plate has a single horse and rider, out of a large group in a procession, done in a very different style, which is thought to be the first venture into etching of the Nancy court painter Jacques Bellange, now known mainly for his prints. Other notable plates of his are a View of the large Hall at Stuttgart (1619) and John Frederick I., Elector of Saxony (1609).

The prints of Brentel are etched with a very light point; and his monogram is found on a series of landscapes ornamented with historical subjects and rich borders, and bearing the dates 1617 and 1619. There are proofs of these borders without the landscapes and figures.

Brentel died in Strasbourg in 1651.
