= Jacques Bellange =

Engraver from Lorraine (1575–1616)

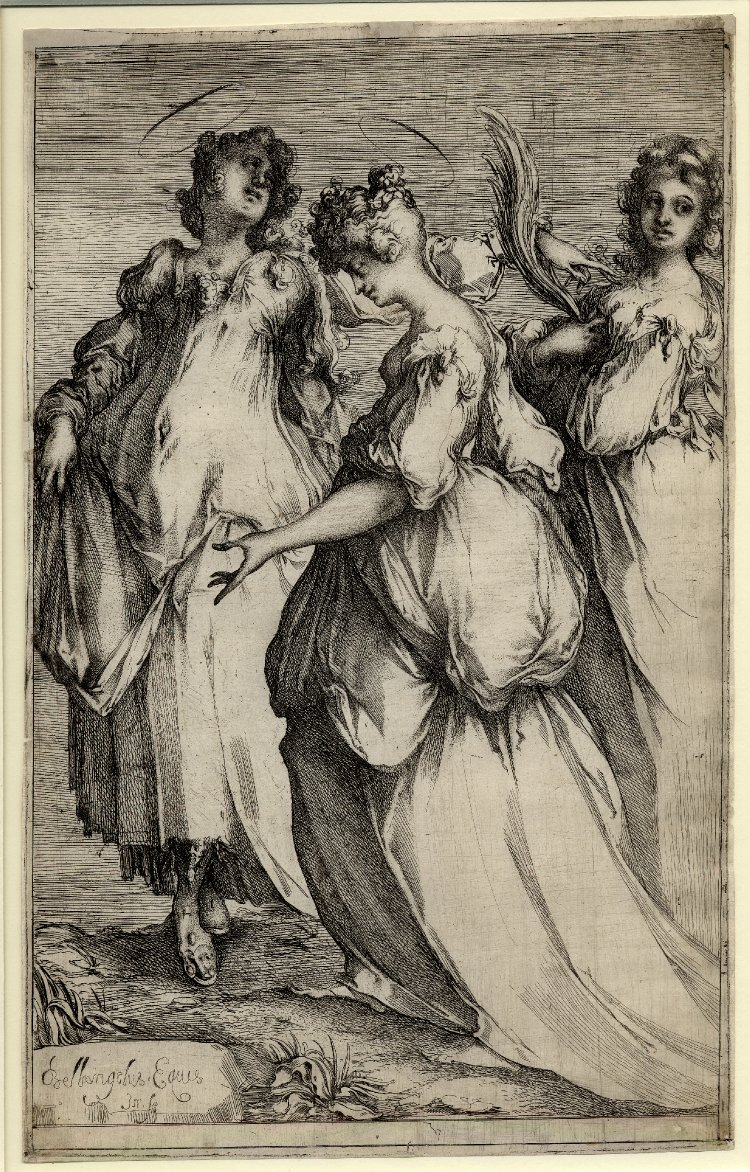
Etching, Three Holy Women, signed Bellangelus. Eques /In. fe.

Jacques Bellange (c. 1575–1616) was an artist and printmaker from the Duchy of Lorraine (then independent but now part of France) whose etchings and some drawings are his only securely identified works today. They are among the most striking Northern Mannerist old master prints, mostly on Catholic religious subjects, and with a highly individual style. He worked for fourteen years in the capital, Nancy as court painter to two Dukes of Lorraine, before dying at the age of about forty, and almost all his prints were produced in the three or four years before his death. None of his paintings are known to have survived, but the prints have been known to collectors since shortly after his death, though they were out of critical favour for most of this period. In the 20th century they have been much more highly regarded, although Bellange is still not a well-known figure.

== Life ==
Bellange's place of birth and family background are unknown, according to Griffiths and Hartley, but most French sources assume he was born in the Bassigny region, also apparently known as "Bellange", in the south of the duchy around the fortified village of La Mothe, where he is first documented in 1595. The village was completely destroyed in 1645 by French armies after a siege during their conquest of Lorraine, and no longer exists.

He is recorded in 1595 as living "at present" in La Mothe; he had travelled to Nancy, where he took on an apprentice, and it is inferred that he must have been at least 20 to do so, hence his approximate date of birth. The complete absence of mentions in the record of his family, his rapid rise from 1602 in the court at Nancy, and his use of the title of "knight" has led to speculation that he may have been the illegitimate son of some court personage.

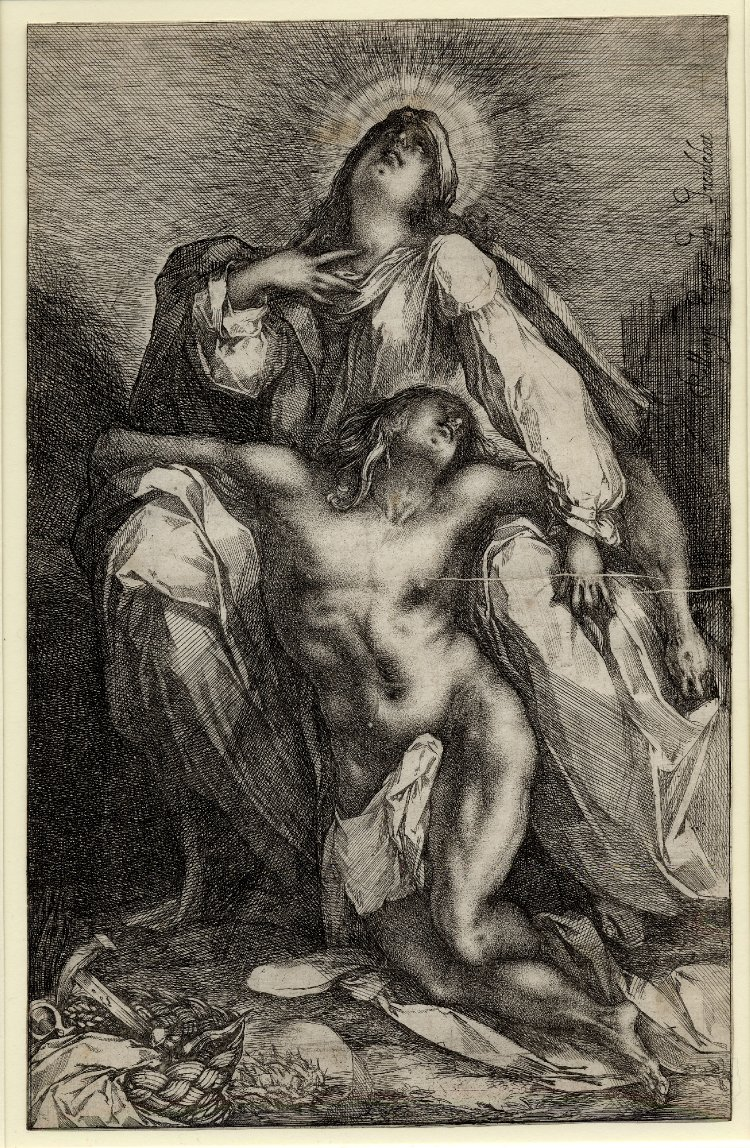
Bellange's Pietá, something of a test-piece for appreciation of his style.

After the 1595 record, there is a complete gap until 1602, although the destruction of La Mothe is likely to be one reason for this. Scholars have speculated that Bellange travelled either in this period or before 1595. The connection with Crispijn de Passe in Cologne (see below) may mean that he had visited that city. In eight of Bellange's prints, his signature describes him as "eques" or "knight", but it seems clear that this title was not given by the Dukes of Lorraine. It is not impossible that he had acquired it at some other court during this period, and returned to Lorraine around 1602 with the prestige of an artist with international experience.

He appears employed as a court painter in Nancy in 1602, and thereafter appears regularly in the court accounts until 1616, the year of his death. After completing his first commission, to paint a room in the palace, he was taken on with a salary of 400 francs in 1603, twice what any previous court painter had been paid, and given the second rank out of the five court painters, with the additional function or title of valet de garderobe.

Some jobs for the court attracted extra payments: in 1606 he repainted, for 1,200 francs, the Galerie des Cerfs, the main public space of the palace, used as a law court among other things. He appears to have repeated the previous scheme of hunting scenes. In the same year he was commissioned (1,700 francs, shared) to execute, but not design, a temporary triumphal arch for the royal entry of Marguerite Gonzaga, the new wife of Henri, the heir to the duchy, who inherited upon the death of his father Charles in 1608. This was Lorraine's first classical triumphal arch, surmounted by a statue of Virgil in honour of the bride's Mantuan home. Bellange also produced a car for use in the ballet produced for the celebrations, with 12 papier-maché putti.

In March 1608, just before the old duke's death, Bellange was given 135 francs for a trip to France to see the new royal art commissions, his only documented travel outside Lorraine. He is not recorded as working on the funeral arrangements in mid-May, so was probably still away. His largest recorded commission, for 4,000 francs in 1610, was to decorate the Salle Neuf of the palace with scenes from Ovid.

In 1612 he married Claude Bergeron, the 17-year-old daughter of a prominent Nancy apothecary, with whom he had three sons. The dowry was 6,000 francs, with a promise that the Bergerons' country house would pass to the couple.

The exact date and cause of Bellange's death in 1616 are unknown. His widow remarried another courtier in 1620 and had a further five children, living into the 1670s. She seems to have neglected her sons from her first marriage, two of whom appear to have died young; Henri, the oldest, was apprenticed in 1626 to Claude Deruet, his father's old apprentice, and was a minor painter, latterly in Paris.

== Etchings ==
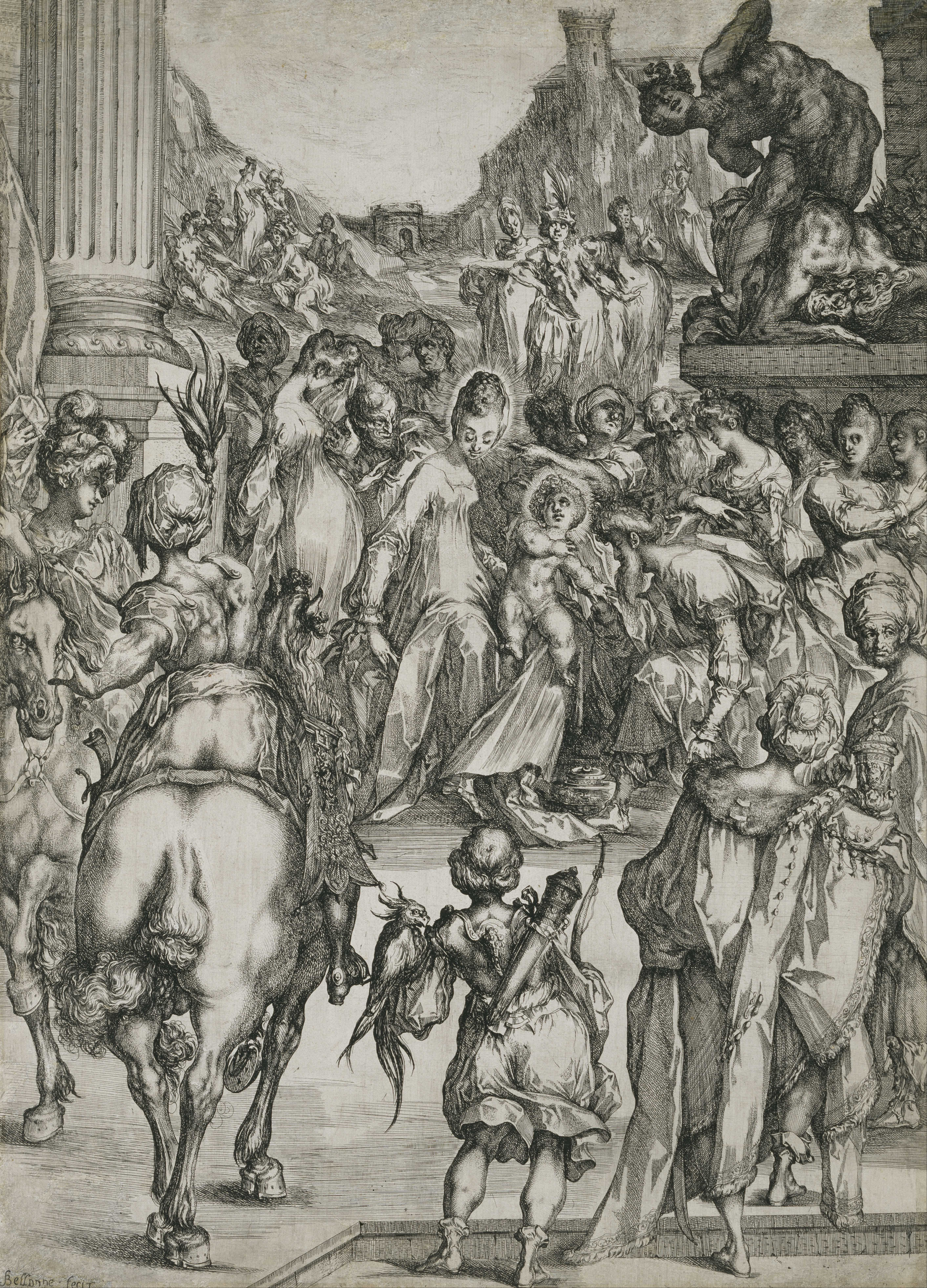
The Adoration of the Magi, at 596 x 429 mm, is Bellange's largest print.

It is generally agreed that 47 or 48 etchings by Bellange survive, and along with a number of drawings these are possibly all that remain of his art today. He probably branched into etching to spread his reputation beyond the rather small world of Nancy, and was successful in this.

His style is a very personal version of the Netherlandish or Northern Mannerism of artists like Bartholomeus Spranger and Hendrik Goltzius, but using a technique derived from Italian etchers like Federico Barocci and Ventura Salimbeni rather than Netherlandish engraving. Sue Welsh Reed relates his style and technique more to the prints of the School of Fontainebleau, while to A. Hyatt Mayor he combined Italian elements "with an all-out emotion that is German and an intricate feminine elegance that is wholly French". Anthony Blunt followed a line of 20th-century criticism that saw his work as:

the last in a long evolution of that particular type of Mannerism in which a private mystical form of religious emotion is expressed in terms which appear at first sight to be merely those of empty aristocratic elegance. The founder of this tradition was Parmigianino, who invented many of the formulas used by his successors, such as the elongation of the figures, the small heads on long necks, the sweeping draperies, the strained, nervous poses of the hands, and the sweet ecstatic smile which those of Protestant upbringing find it hard not to think of as sickly and insincere, but which incorporates a particular kind of mystical feeling.

There are no concessions to realism in his work. Female figures predominate; most, but not the Virgin, dressed in a fantasy mixture of contemporary court fashion and antique dress. Men mostly wear fantastical versions of Ancient Roman parade uniforms mixed with Oriental elements, including some of the most elaborate footwear seen in art. His work for the court in designing costumes for masques and ballets may be an influence here, and it has been suggested that the four female "gardeners" are connected with specific costume designs. Regular special effects in his compositions include manipulation of space, and many large figures seen from behind in the foreground of works; both the Apostles and Magi sets of single figures include ones seen only from behind, with no face visible. Technically, he makes much use of stippling and burnishing to achieve effects of light and to convey texture.

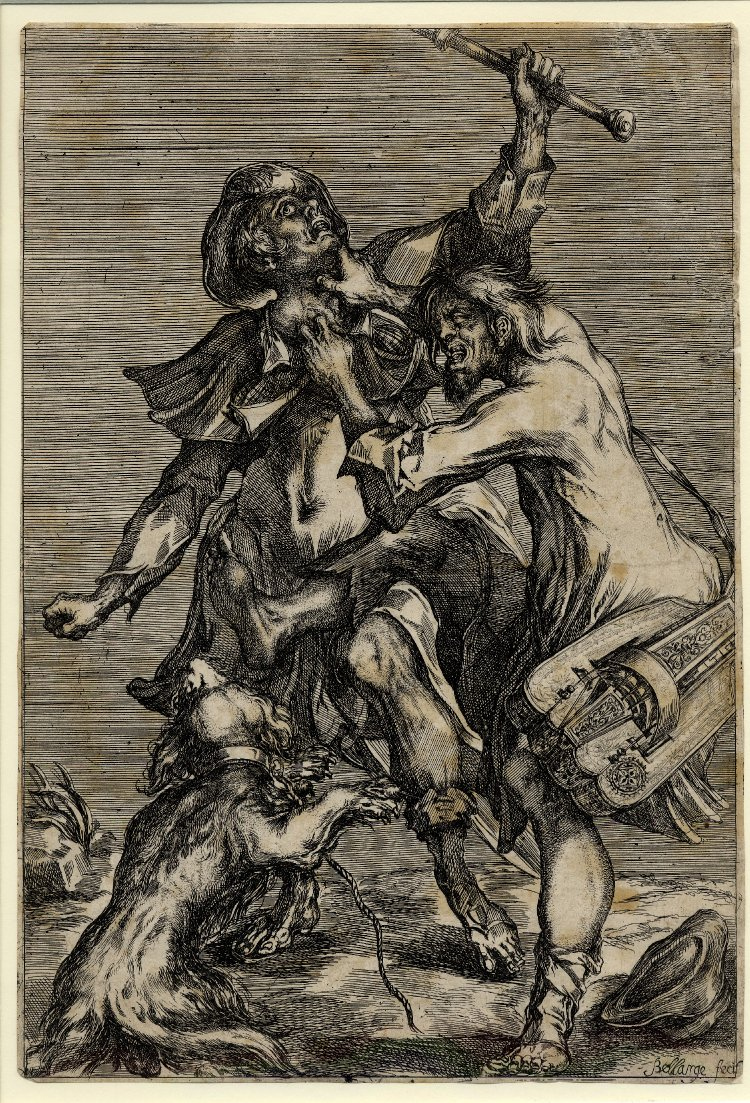
Hurdy-gurdy Player Attacking a Pilgrim, one of only two prints of a genre scene.

His two prints with a hurdy-gurdy man come from a very different world of genre works and realism, and the violence of the larger one was original at the time, anticipating themes to be taken up in later decades by the slightly younger Lorraine artist Jacques Callot and others.

His first venture into etching seems to be a single self-portrait inserted into a large print of the ceremonial entry of the new Duke Henri into Nancy in 1610. The established printmaker Friedrich Brentel and his young assistant Matthias Merian—later a major producer of maps and town views—had been brought in to produce a series of prints depicting the funeral of the old Duke Charles in 1608, and the celebrations for the new duke after mourning was complete. Plate 10 of the series shows a large group of mounted courtiers as part of a procession, and it was realized in 1971 that one of the figures, and his horse, is etched in a completely different style, that can be related to Bellange's other prints. It is now generally agreed that Bellange persuaded Brentel (or vice versa) that he should portray himself. This would have been in 1611, and a bookplate that looks to be an early effort is dated 1613; after that, none of his prints are dated, although most are signed.

Scholars have attempted a tentative chronology for the prints, essentially within the period from 1613 to 1616, based mainly on Bellange's increasing confidence and skill with the medium of etching, which was usually supplemented by a limited amount of engraving and, in a few cases, touches of drypoint. However, Griffiths and Hartley are too cautious to do so, noting that differences of technique can arise as much from the different requirements of individual plates as developing skill. Sue Welsh Reed, on the other hand, makes many comments on the assumed place of individual prints in a chronology, placing works like the Annunciation and Pietá among the last, and also seeing an increasing skill in composition as the sequence progresses.

Bellange's widow is recorded as owning 22 of his etched plates in 1619; probably these included the 18 that were later re-issued by the Parisian publisher Jean Le Blond, who added his name to the plate. This suggests that in his lifetime, Bellange supervised the printing of impressions himself; from at least 1615 there was a printing press for intaglio copperplates (a different piece of equipment to a book press) in Nancy. Distribution of prints through a network of dealers across Europe was already becoming rather efficient. Matthias Merian, whom Bellange must have known from his visit in 1610/11, produced 11 pirate copies of Bellange prints for a publisher in Strasbourg, probably as early as 1615—a standard sign of a successful print in those days. An impression of Bellange's Pieta records that it was bought by John Evelyn in Rome in 1645, and Cassiano dal Pozzo had bought several Bellange prints there, and copies, by the 1650s.

Bellange's subjects can be summarized as:

- Five large prints of religious narrative subjects:Adoration of the Magi, Christ Carrying the Cross, The Martyrdom of St Lucy, Raising of Lazarus, Three Women/Marys at the Tomb
- Smaller religious prints, with several Madonnas and Child
- An incomplete set of figures of Christ, St Paul and the Twelve Apostles, several in two versions, sixteen in total
- A set of three figures of the Three Magi
- Four figures of female "gardeners" or Hortulanae
- Two subjects with a hurdy-gurdy man
- Two scenes from classical mythology, The Death of Portia and Diana and the Hunter (or Orion), and Military figures outside a city, which is either a capriccio, or depicts a classical subject that is now unclear.
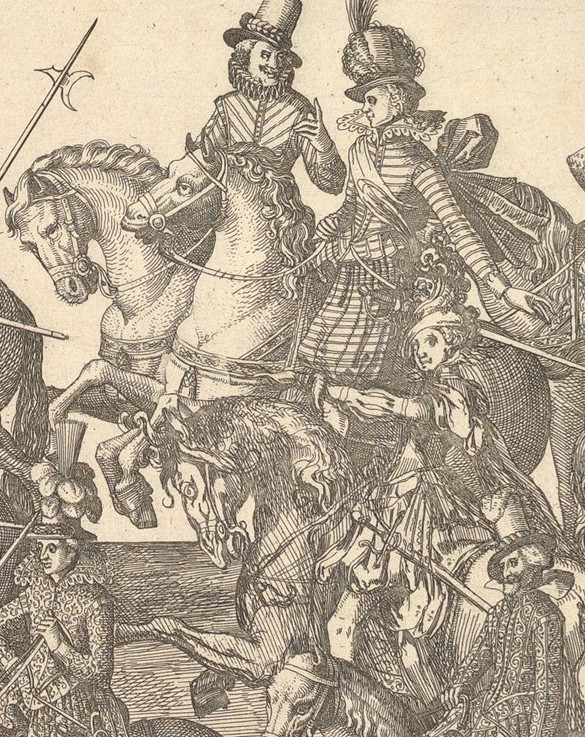
Probable self-portrait at centre of Funeral of Charles III of Lorraine

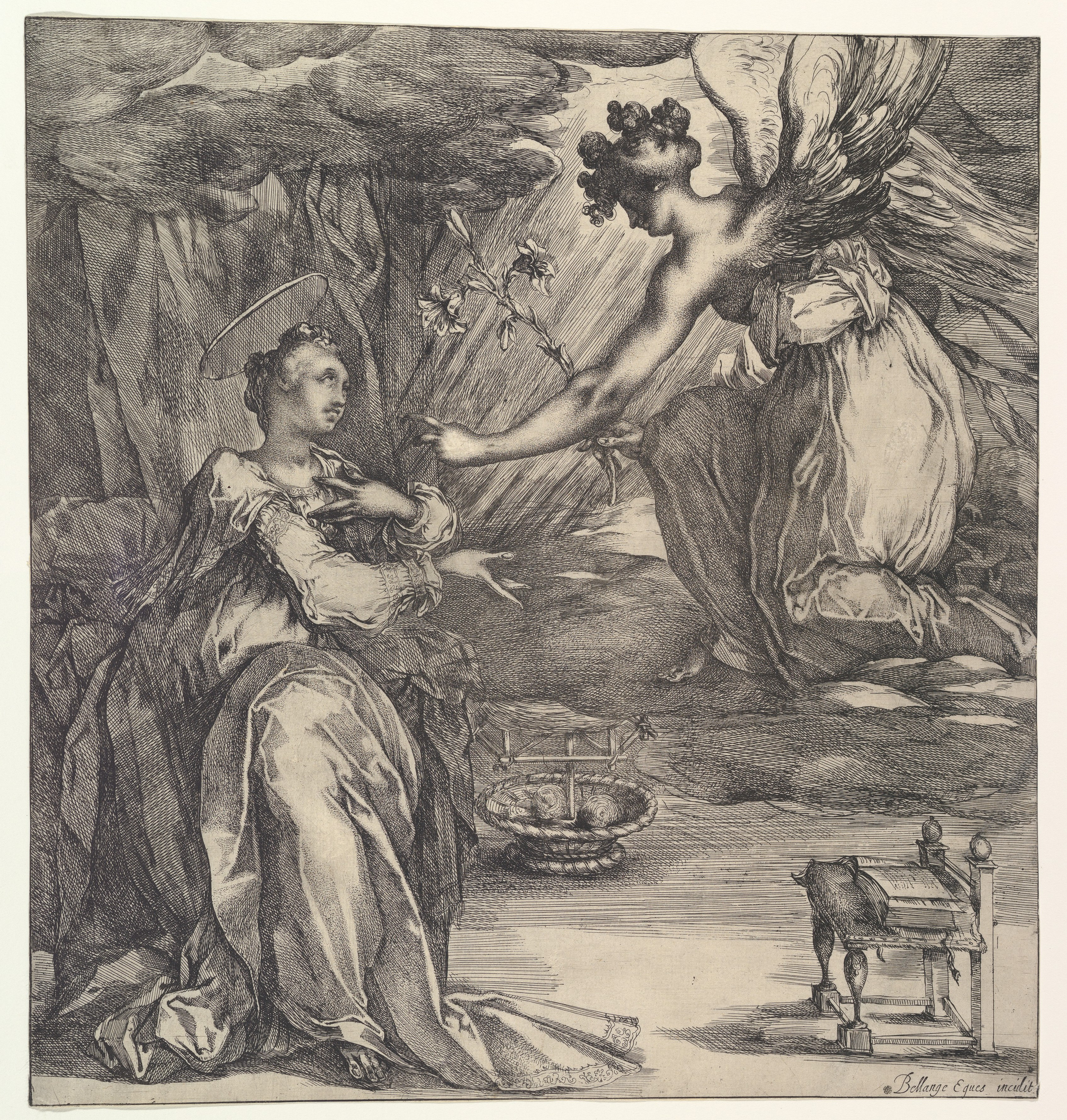
Annunciation

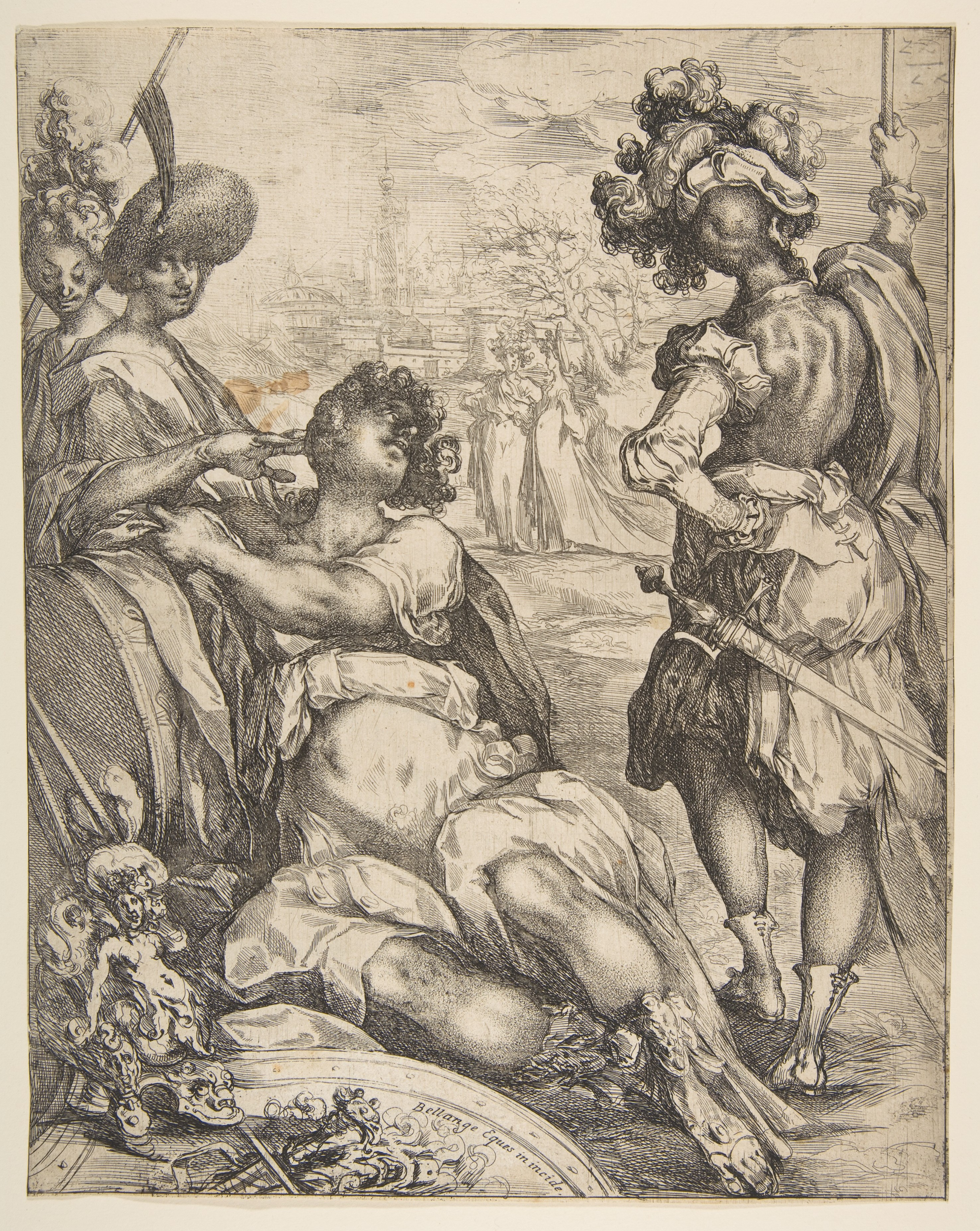
Military figures outside a city

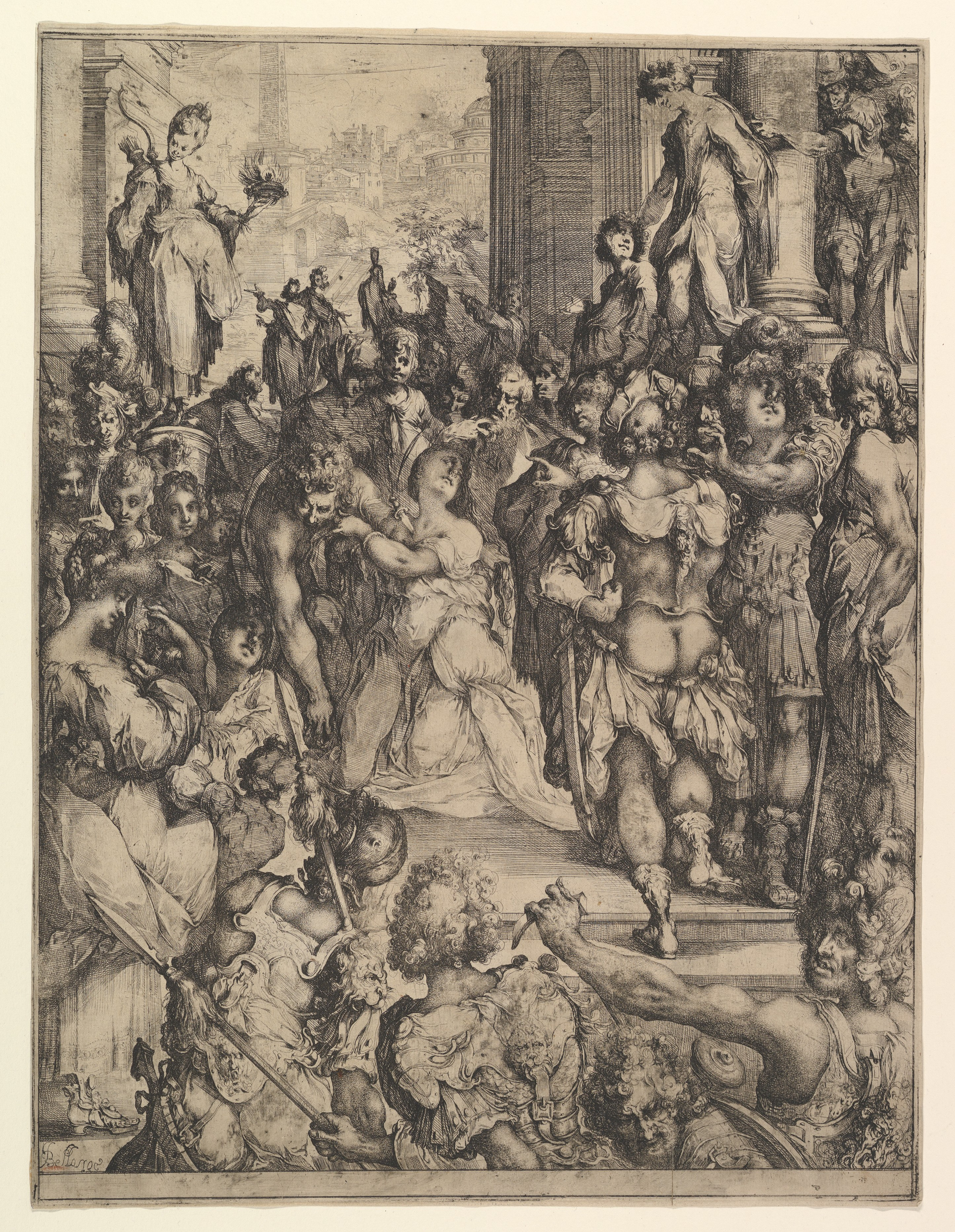
The Martyrdom of St Lucy

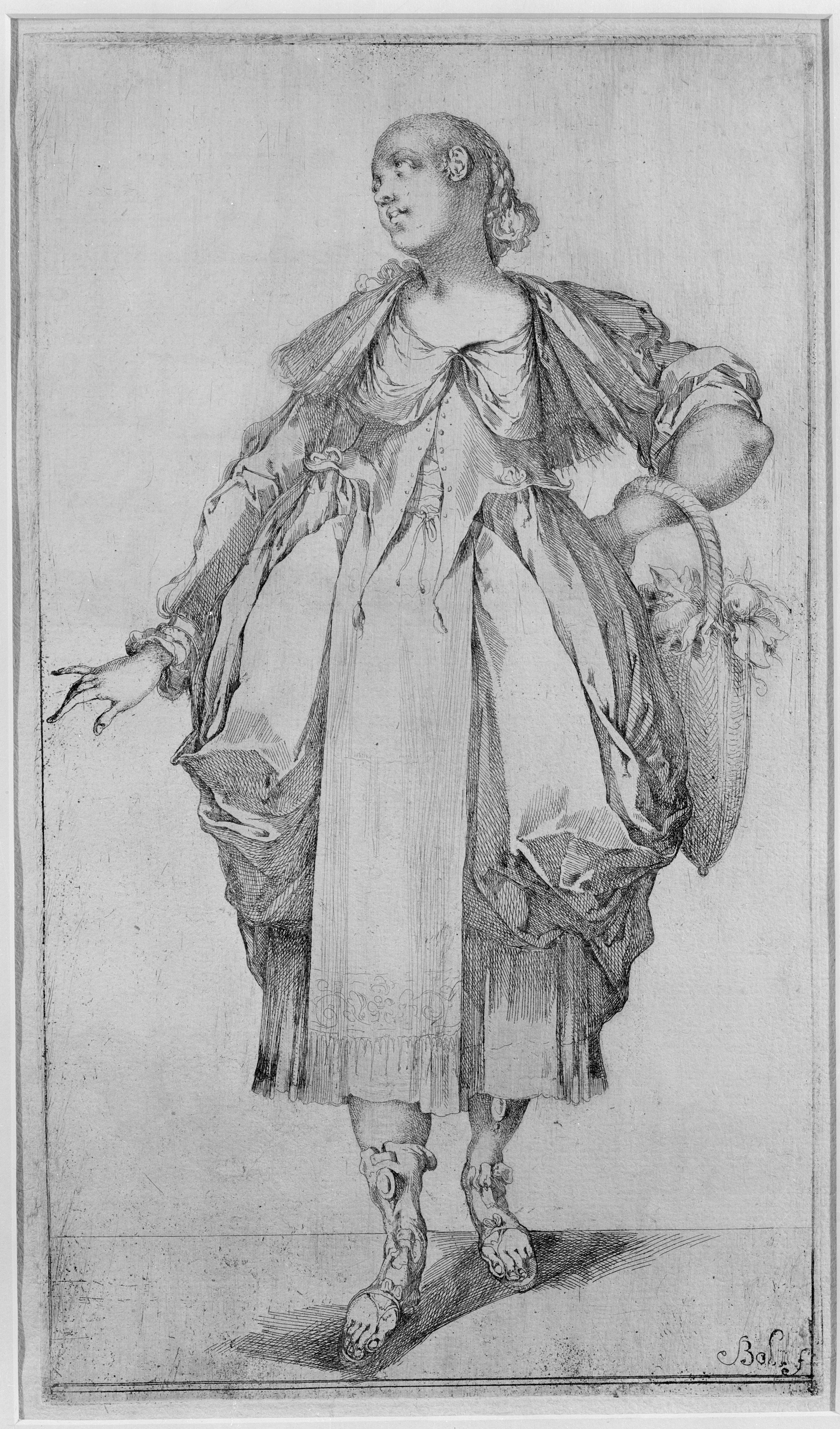
Gardener with basket, one of four "Hortulanae"

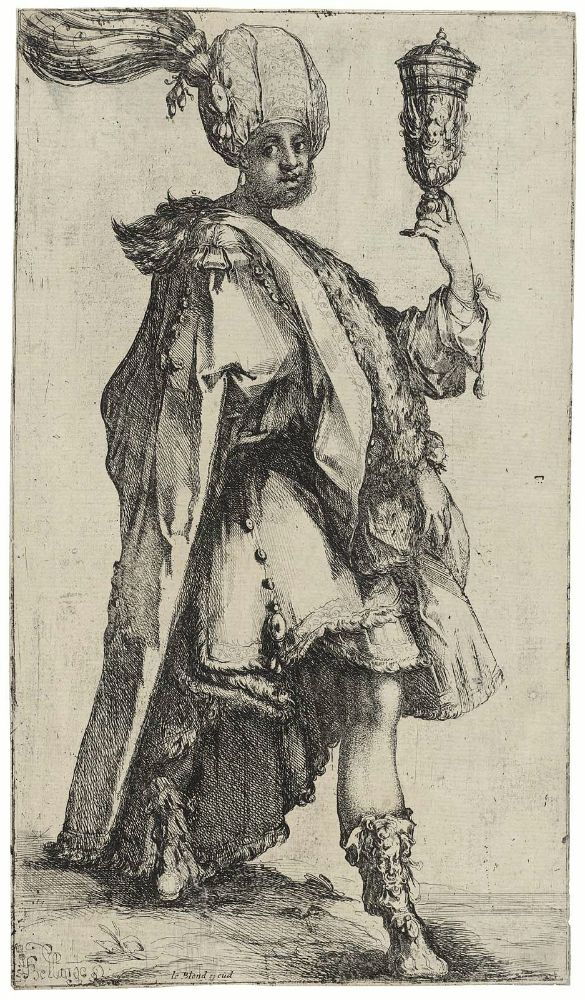
Balthazar, one of the Three Magi

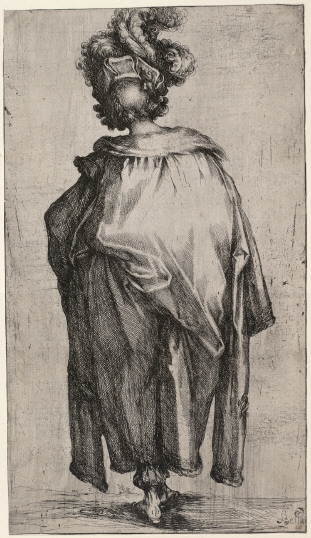
Melchior, another, seen from behind

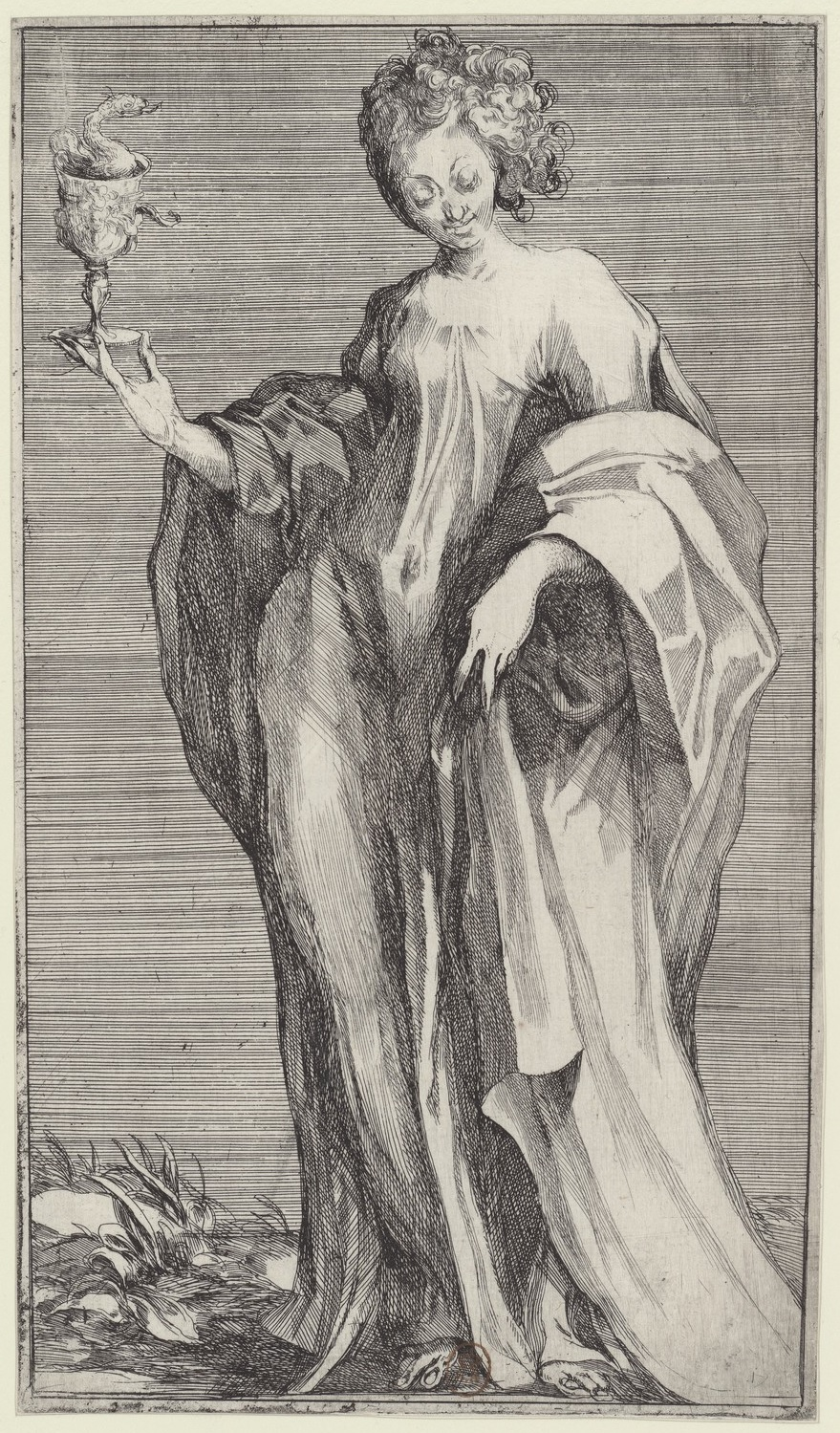
Saint John the Apostle

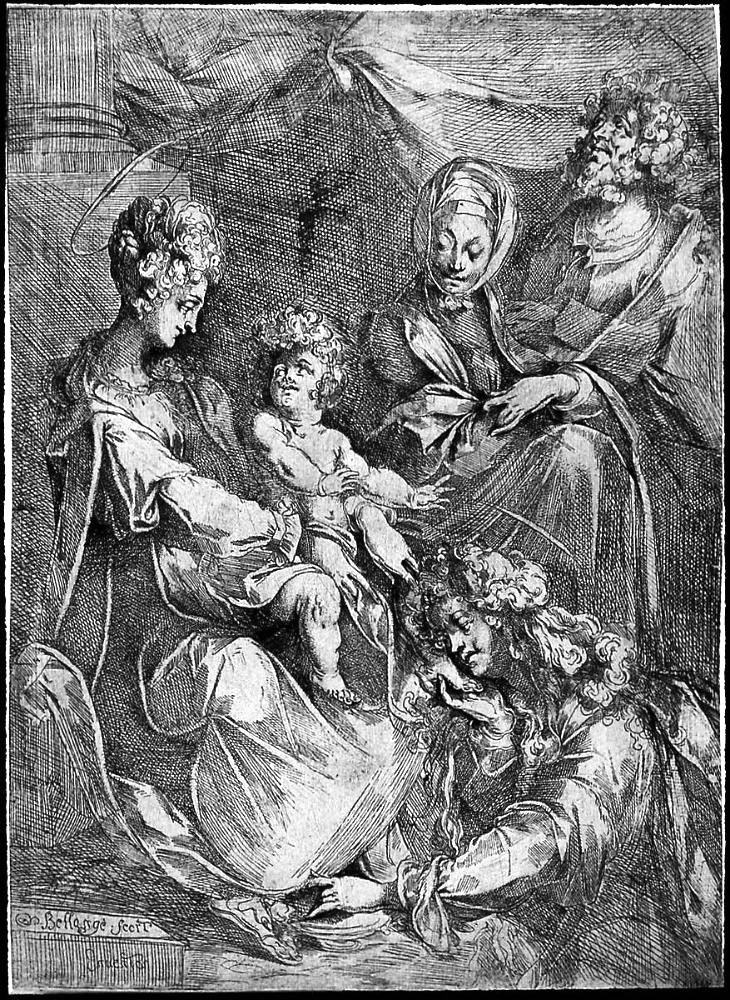
The Virgin and Child with the Magdalen and Saint Anne

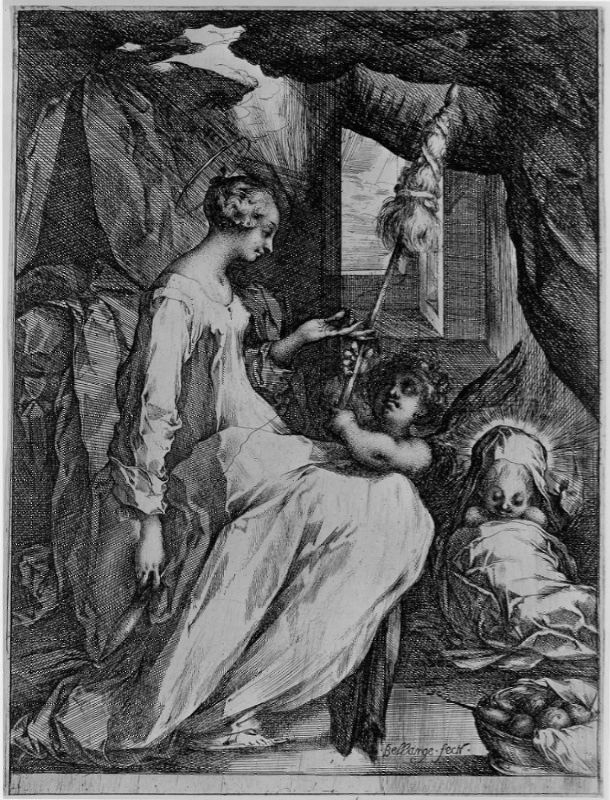
The Virgin with a Spindle

== Paintings ==
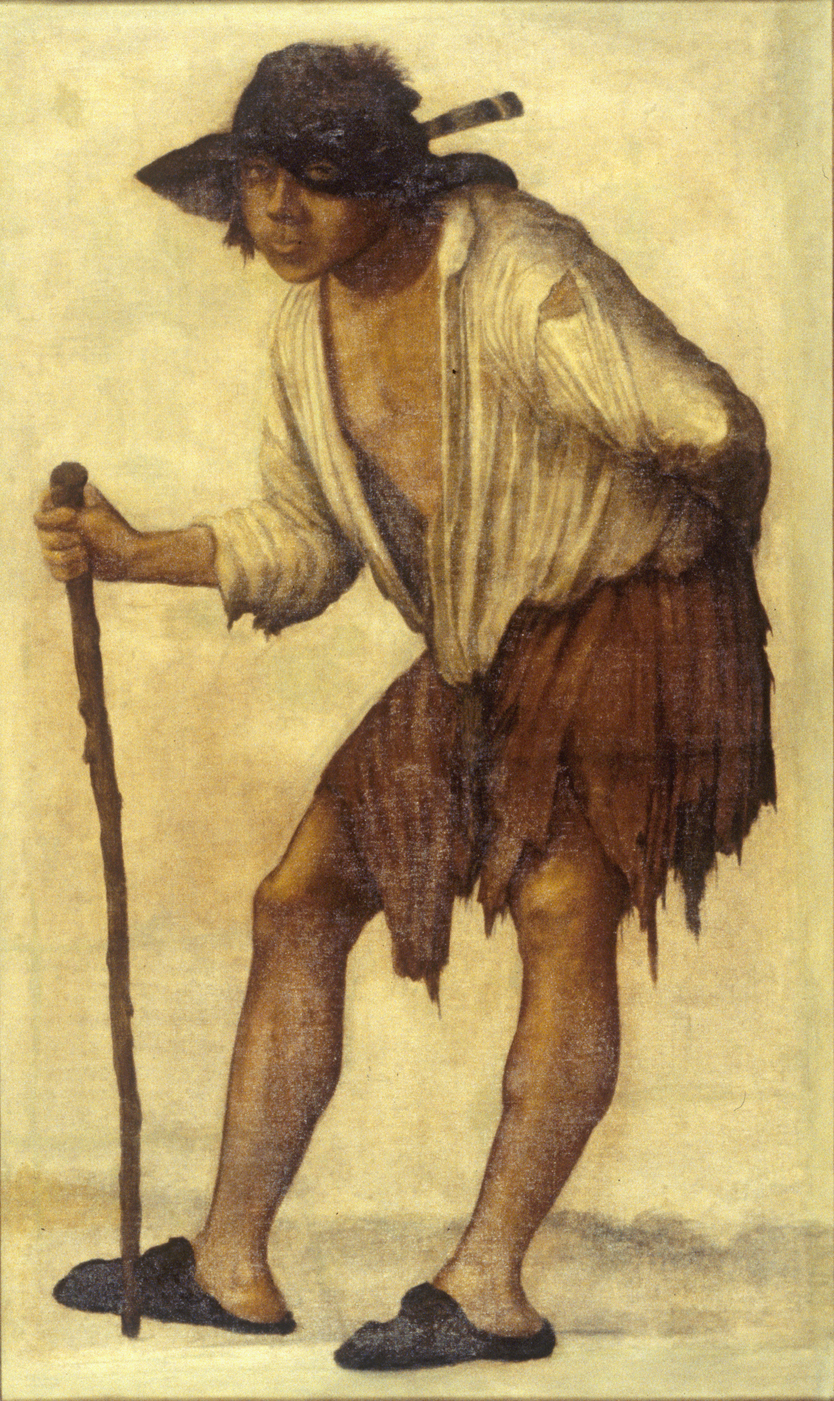
The Beggar looking through his hat in the Walters Art Museum, Baltimore, attributed to Bellange.

No firmly attributed painting by Bellange survives; all the palace decorations that were his major commissions have been destroyed. A number of easel paintings have been attributed to him, but there is little consensus among art historians on the correctness of these attributions, and the works have varying degrees of relation to the idiosyncratic style of Bellange's etchings. A Lamentation of Christ in the Hermitage Museum has been attributed to Bellange since the 1970s, and a related drawing is probably by Bellange, but the Hermitage canvas itself is described by Griffiths and Hartley as "a rather nasty object, with lurid flesh tones, and many have refused to believe that it could be from Bellange's hand". Other leading candidates are Saint Francis in Ecstasy Supported by Two Angels in Nancy, and a pair of panels of the Virgin and Angel of the Annunciation in Karlsruhe.

To his Nancy contemporaries, Bellange must have been known mainly as a painter, but no very useful descriptions of his work survive. He is recorded as painting a number of portraits, but none are known to have survived. A Beggar Looking Through His Hat in the Walters Art Museum, Baltimore, which they attribute to Bellange, was donated by the former Soviet spy Michael Straight (1931–2004): "Given the secretive character of the man depicted, peering at us through a hole in his hat, the painting may have had a particular appeal for its previous owner", the museum suggests. It has been speculated that some of his prints are versions of his paintings, but there is no evidence for this, and the evidence of compositional changes made during the etching process in some prints goes against the theory.

== Drawings ==
About 80 to 100 drawings attributed to Bellange survive, though many of these would not be accepted by all authorities; there is no catalogue raisonné as yet. The concentration on religious subjects in the prints is less marked in the drawings. Only one drawing that is clearly the preparatory working drawing for an etching survives, The Virgin and Child with the Magdalen and Saint Anne at Yale, which has been intensively worked on and was apparently gone over with a blind (inkless) stylus to transfer the main outlines onto the plate at the start of etching. A drawing in the Louvre is of a group of background figures for another print, and many drawings are similar to the etchings but with different compositions, perhaps preliminary sketches; "they are nearly always spontaneous, swift and tense", and often mainly in wash.

Other drawings unrelated to his etchings survive, and in 1600–1602, long before he is known to have etched himself, Bellange supplied the prolific Flemish printmaker Crispijn de Passe, best known in Britain for his print of the Gunpowder Plotters a few years later, who was then living in Cologne, with drawings for eight prints that de Passe engraved, crediting Bellange with the design (inv. or invenit) on the plate. Five of these were a series called Mimicarum aliquot facetiarum icones ad habitum italicum expressi or "Depictions of some droll witticisms, rendered in the Italian manner".

A drawing of a single figure then described as of Hercules sold for the remarkable price of £542,500 at Sotheby's in 2001, and is now in the Metropolitan Museum of Art, New York, which has decided it represents Samson.

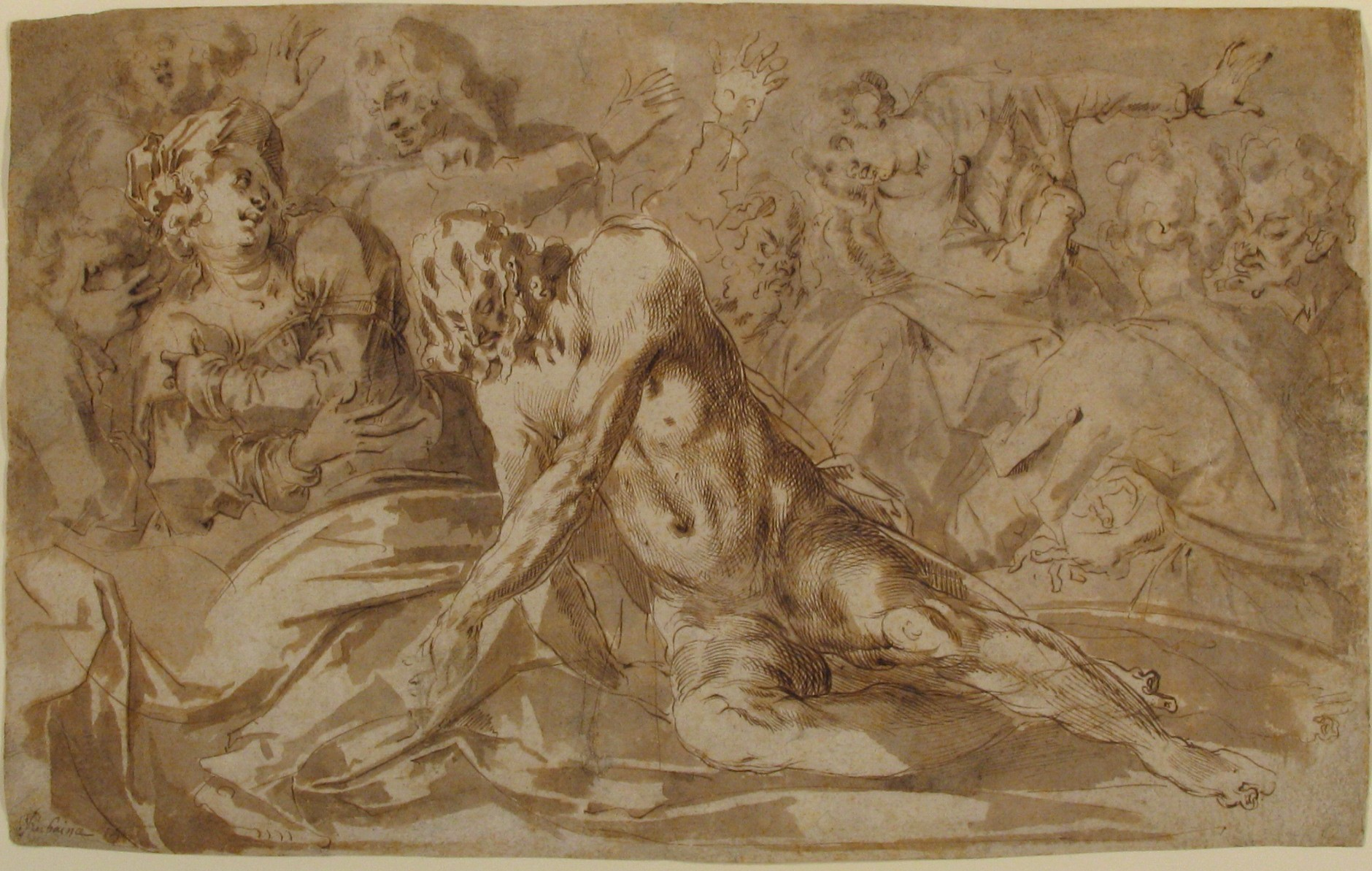
The Raising of Lazarus, Metropolitan Museum of Art

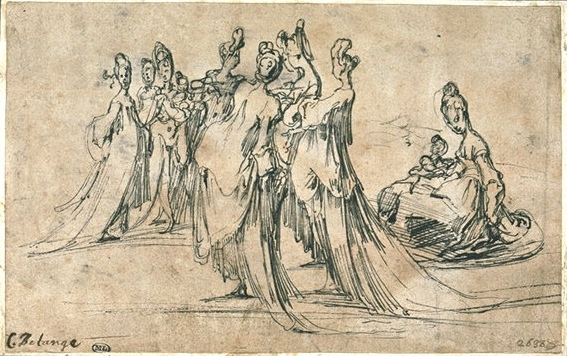
Study for background group in the Raising of Lazarus, Louvre

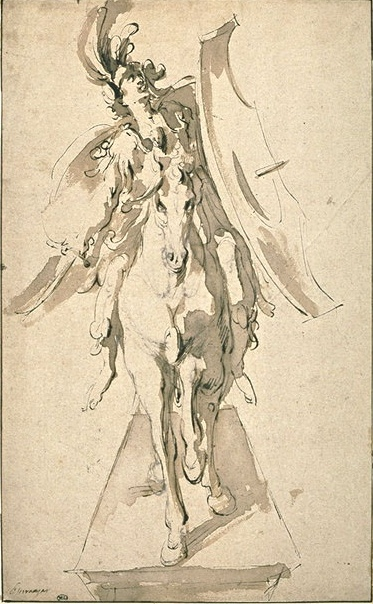
Equestrian statue, Louvre

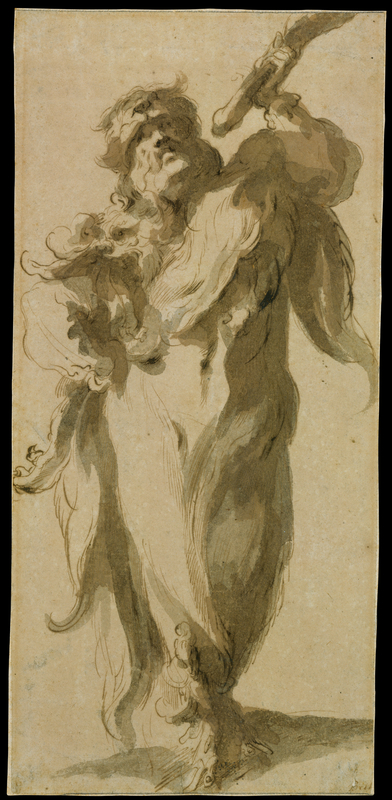
Samson or Hercules, see text. Metropolitan Museum of Art

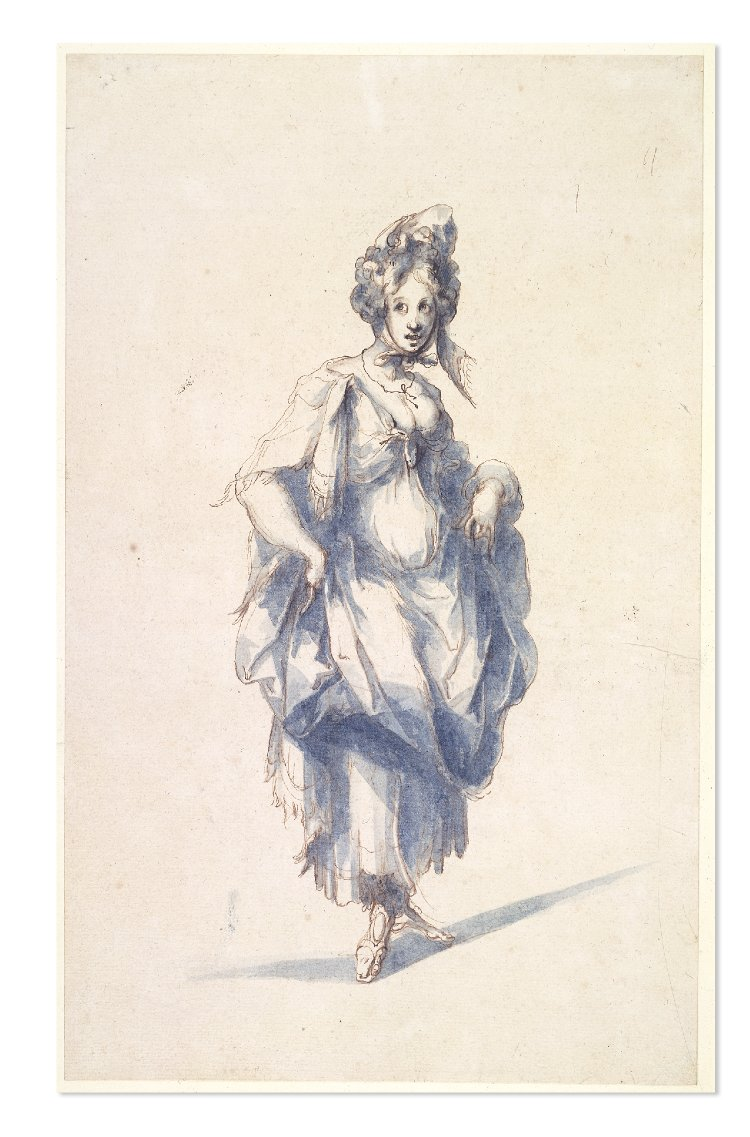
Figure of a young woman, British Museum

== Reputation ==
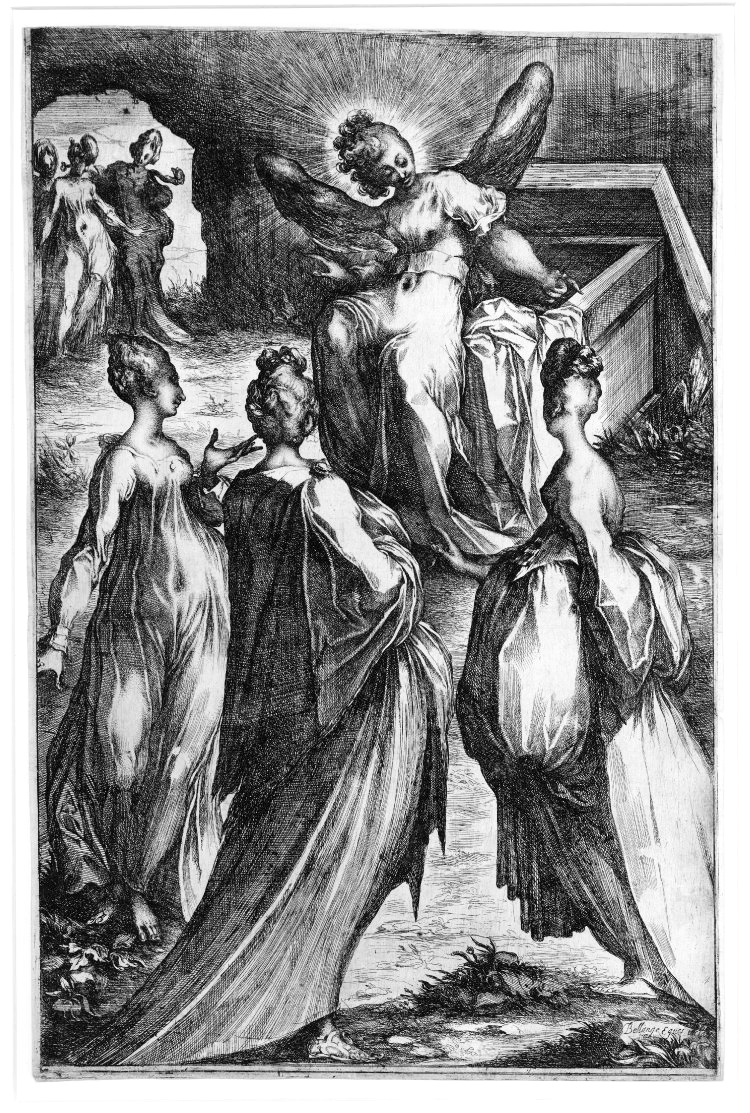
The Three Marys at the Tomb

Bellange's reputation was fairly widespread by soon after his death, presumably very largely through his prints. The imitations by Merian and others, the reprints by Le Blond in Paris, and the large numbers of prints that survive, many from plates worn by large numbers of impressions, all imply that his prints had a healthy market. Many drawings have early inscriptions attributing them to him, which are often not supported by modern scholars, suggesting that an attribution to Bellange was a desirable one to have. In 1620 Balthazar Gerbier, a leading Flemish agent for collectors like the Duke of Buckingham and Charles I, and a friend of Rubens, wrote a memorial poem for Goltzius, part of which translates as: "Italy boasts of Raphael and Michelangelo, Germany of Albrecht Dürer, France of Bellange". In another poem of 1652, from Paris, Bellange is included in a similar list of great names from art.

By this time, however, the taste in French art for a cool and classical form of Baroque that had set in from the 1620s was already reducing the appreciation of Bellange, whose reputation continued to fall, along with that of Mannerism in general. For the same reason, there are no artists who can be seen to have been directly influenced by Bellange's style. Unlike the Dutch and Italians, French artists had no large collection of biographies until the latter part of the century, but the great print collector Michel de Marolles was aware of 47 or 48 prints by Bellange, most of which were in his collections; these would not be exactly the same as the 47 or 48 in modern works, but very largely so. By the mid-18th century, the great French authority Pierre-Jean Mariette was scornful and dismissive: "Bellange is one of those painters whose licentious manner, completely removed from a proper style, deserves great distrust. It nevertheless had its admirers, and Bellange had a great vogue. ... Several pieces by him are known, which one cannot bear to look at, so bad is their taste". Many biographical compendiums simply omitted him, even as late as the 1920s. Another judgment of 1767 was quoted with approval by A. P. F. Robert-Dumesnil in his biographical dictionary Le Peintre-Graveur Français (1841), complaining that Bellange's etchings had "much more bizarreness than judgment, and very little correctness". However, Robert-Dumesnil did recognise that his style had something in common with the Romantics.

Bellange's critical rehabilitation came with a general revival of interest in Mannerism. Ludwig Burchard wrote an article about him in 1911, with somewhat cautious praise. An important lecture by the Viennese art historian Max Dvořák, Über Greco und den Manierismus ("On Greco and Mannerism", published 1921) focused on four artists: Michelangelo, Tintoretto, Bellange, and the almost-as-reviled El Greco. Bellange became an intellectual fashion and his work was interpreted in various ways. The German art historian Erica Tietze-Conrat pursued a Freudian interpretation: "The way in which the artist sees forms is strongly sexual, perversely sexual; and entirely genuine, since it mirrors the artist's sub-conscious. Otherwise he would never have drawn Saint John in a series of Apostles in so female a fashion...The angel of the Annunciation is a hermaphrodite, but not with mixed but with marked characteristics of either sex...". Another tradition, reflected in the quotation from Anthony Blunt above, followed Otto Benesch in placing Bellange in the context of a strain of Gothic mysticism that penetrated French Renaissance art.

The first exhibition devoted to Bellange took place in 1931/32 at the Albertina in Vienna, followed by an American one in 1975 (Des Moines, Boston, and New York), based around the excellent collection that the Boston Museum of Fine Arts had built up over the preceding decades. In 1997 a European exhibition based on an American private collection went to the British Museum, Rijksmuseum Amsterdam and Statens Museum, Copenhagen, as well as the Carnegie Museum of Art in Pittsburgh. An exhibition was held in Rennes in 2001. Bellange has also featured prominently in exhibitions with a broader scope in the period, and there is now a catalogue raisonné of the prints by Nicole Walch, Die Radierungen des Jacques Bellange, Munich 1971.
