= Claude Deruet =

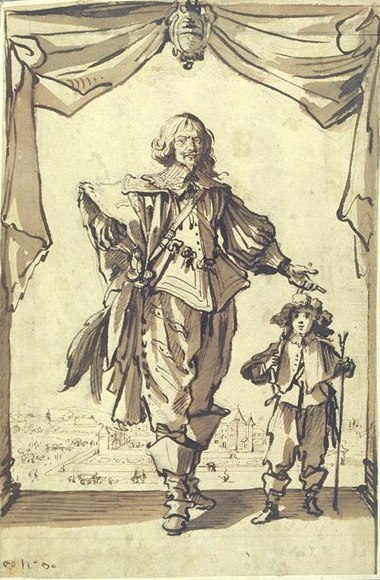
- Portrait of Claude Deruet accompanied by his son Henri-Nicolas, by Jacques Callot, Louvre, Paris
- Born: 1588; Nancy, Kingdom of France
- Died: 20 October 1660 (aged 71–72); Nancy, Kingdom of France
- Education: Jacques Bellange; Antonio Tempesta
- Occupation: Painter
- Movement: Baroque

Claude Deruet (French: [klod dəʁɥɛ]; 1588 – 20 October 1660) was a French Baroque painter of the 17th century, from the city of Nancy.

== Biography ==
Deruet was an apprentice to Jacques Bellange, the official court painter to Charles III, Duke of Lorraine. He was in Rome between c. 1612 and 1619, where – according to André Félibien – he studied with the painter and etcher Antonio Tempesta. During his stay in Rome, he painted the Japanese samurai Hasekura Tsunenaga on a visit to Europe in 1615, and frescoed the private chapel of Cardinal Scipione Borghese at the Villa Borghese Pinciana. The Rome-based engraver and print publisher Philippe Thomassin produced several engravings based on Deruet's preliminary drawings.

Deruet was made a noble by the Duke of Lorraine in 1621, and was then made a Knight of the Order of Saint Michael in 1645 by Louis XIII, who had in 1641 absorbed most of Lorraine into France. He had a luxurious residence in Nancy, named La Romaine, where Louis XIII and Queen Anne of Austria stayed in 1633.

Claude Lorrain was an apprentice to Claude Deruet in 1623 for one year. On 11 September 1623 Deruet married Marie de Saulcourt. The couple had two sons, one of whom grew up to become a painter, Henri-Nicolas Deruet. Jacques Callot created an engraving of a portrait of Deruet; the original preparatory drawing for this work is preserved in the Louvre.

American architect DeWitt H. Fessenden wrote a biography of Deruet, The Life and Works of Claude Deruet, in 1952.

== Gallery of images ==
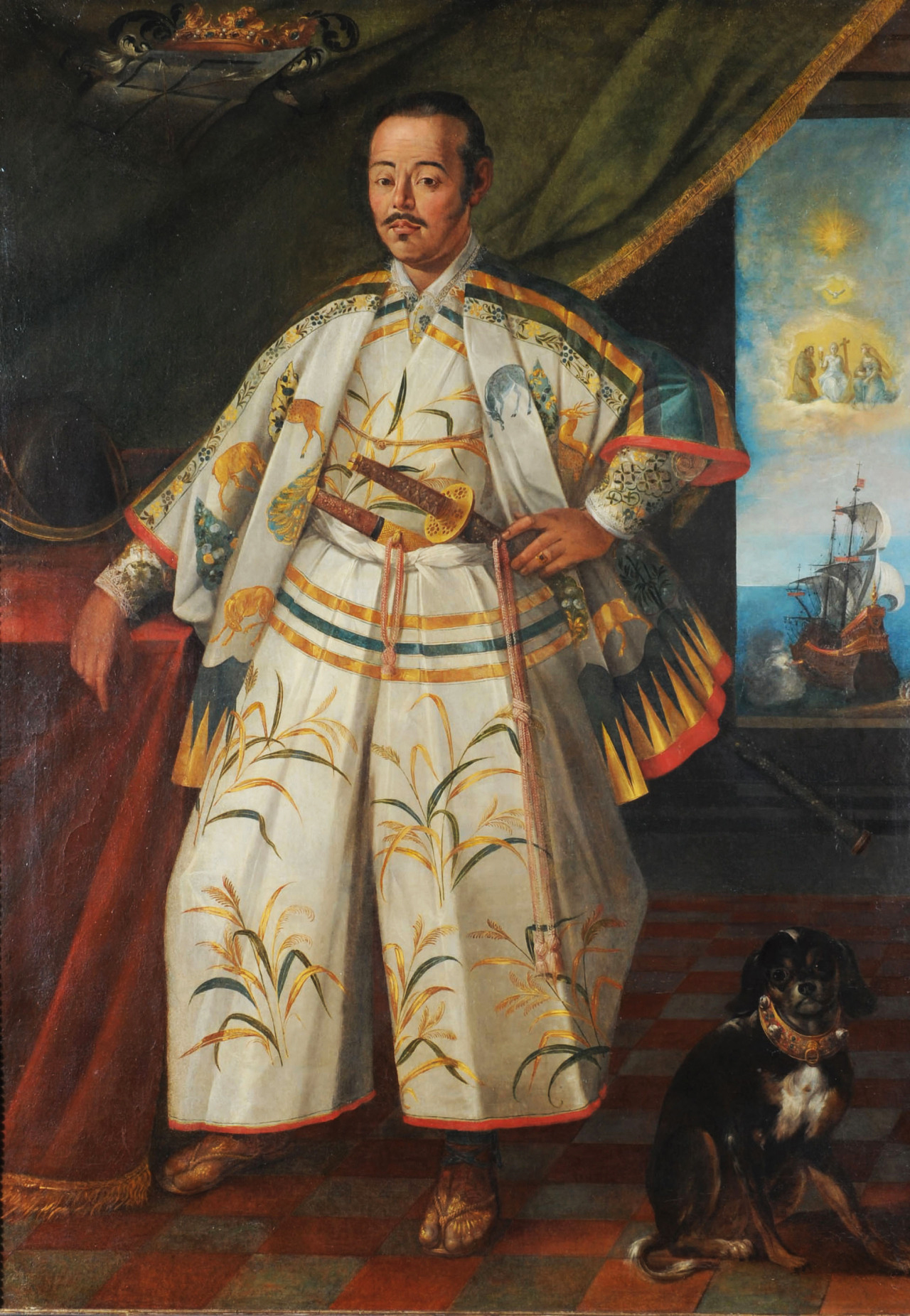
Portrait of Hasekura Tsunenaga, 1615.

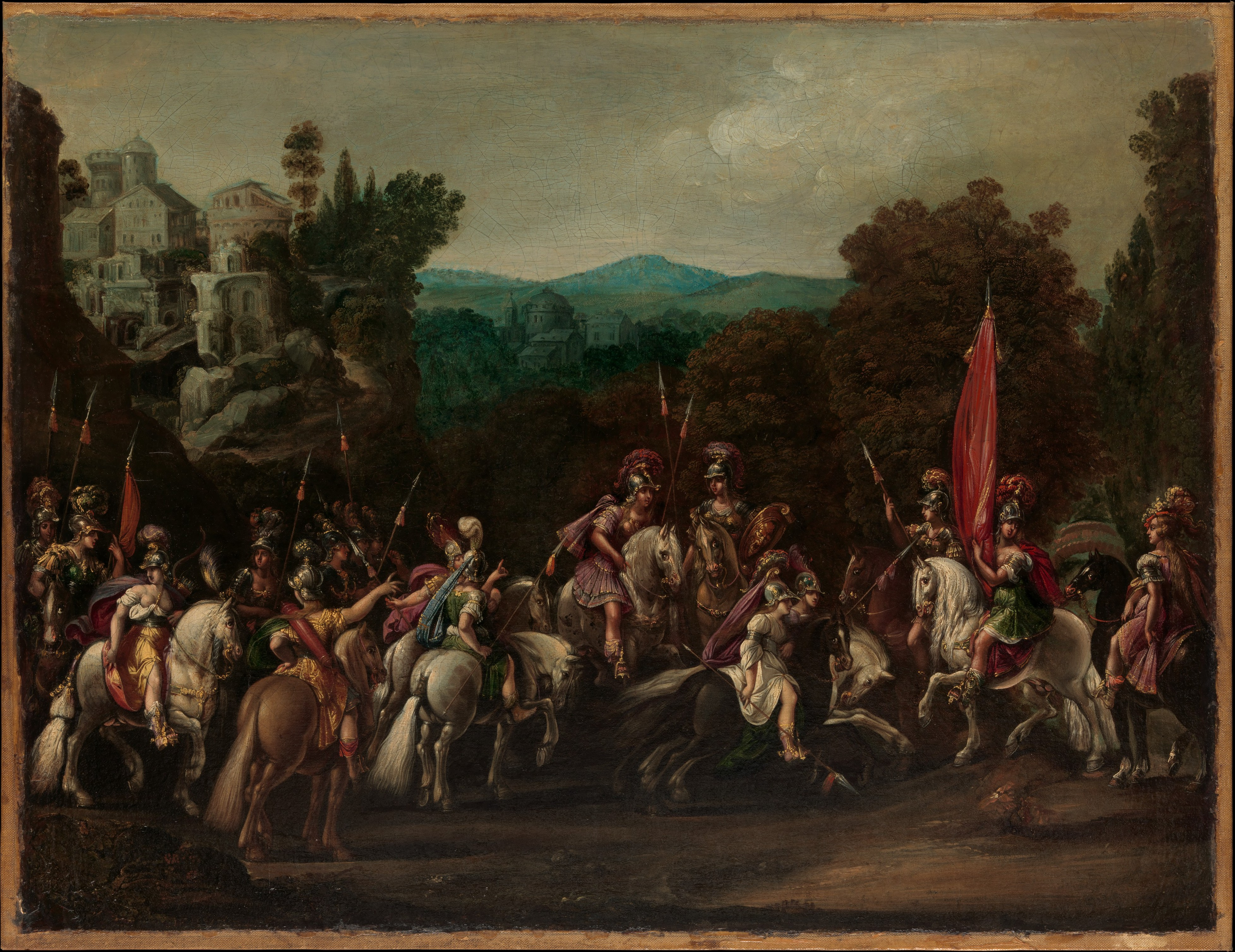
Departure of the Amazons, 1620.

Madonna and Child, 1620.

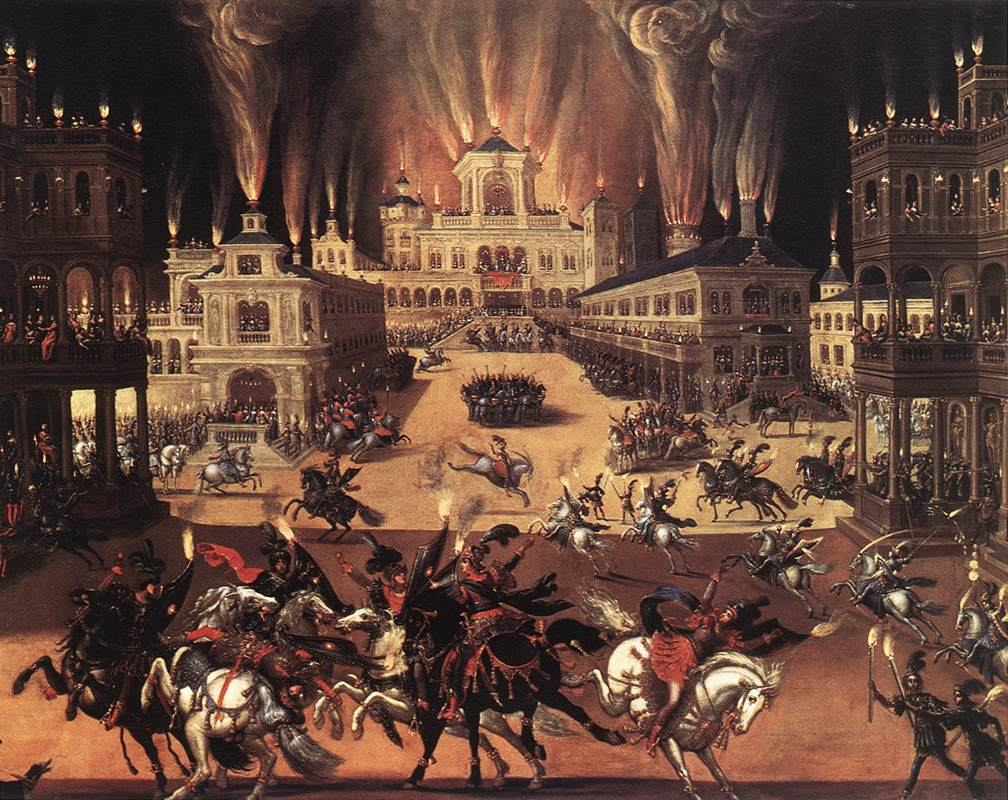
Fire. Part of a series on Classical elements, 1642.

== See also ==
- French Renaissance

== Sources ==
- Jacques Thuillier; Pierre Arizzoli-Clémentel, eds. (1982). Claude Lorrain e i pittori lorenesi in Italia nel XVII secolo (in Italian). Rome: De Luca. pp. 103–133.
