= John W. English =

American judge (1831–1916)

John W. English (February 1831 – July 18, 1916) was a justice of the Supreme Court of Appeals of West Virginia from January 1, 1889 to December 31, 1900. At the time of his death, he was the seniormost former living justice of the court.

English was a Democrat. Future justice George Poffenbarger studied law under English.

Political offices
Preceded by Samuel Woods	Justice of the Supreme Court of Appeals of West Virginia; 1889–1900	Succeeded by George Poffenbarger
