= Livia Simpson Poffenbarger =

American newspaper owner and historian

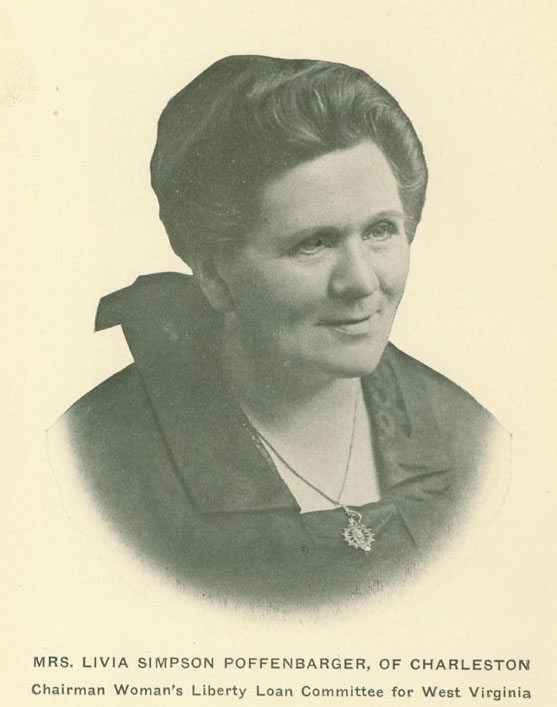
- Born: Olivia Nye Simpson; March 1, 1862; Pomeroy, Ohio, U.S.
- Died: October 27, 1937 (aged 75); Charleston, West Virginia, U.S.
- Occupations: Newspaper editor, Politician
- Spouse: George Poffenbarger (m. 1894)

Olivia Nye Simpson Poffenbarger (known as Livia) (March 1, 1862 – October 27, 1937) was an American newspaper owner/editor, historian, social activist, civic leader, and Republican politician in West Virginia.

== Biography ==
Olivia Nye Simpson was born in Pomeroy, Ohio, March 1, 1862. Her family moved to Point Pleasant, West Virginia when she was a young girl. In addition to her public school education, she studied in her father's law firm for two years. From 1884 until 1888, Simpson worked as a school teacher. In 1888, she purchased the struggling State Gazette newspaper in that town and ran it successfully until selling it in 1913.

She served the Republican party as an advisor working on the 1912 convention, was on a national Republican advisory committee from 1920–24, and was an elector in 1924. She was the state director for the women's suffrage campaign in West Virginia. She chaired an advisory committee on a bond issue to improve state roads, speaking statewide for its adoption.

Having organized the Mason County chapter of the American Red Cross, she directed relief efforts during a flood in 1913. During World War I, she chaired three statewide Liberty Loan drives, with techniques that were adopted nationwide. In 1919, she received an honorary doctorate from West Virginia University.

She frequently wrote about the Battle of Point Pleasant, arguing that it should be regarded as the first battle of the American Revolution. Her view has received little support from historians, but her efforts led to the creation of Tu-Endie-Wei State Park and the erection of a monument on the battle site. She wrote a number of other books and pamphlets on West Virginia history.

== Political career ==
Poffenbarger identified with both the state and national Republican party. She served as advisor in the party's 1912 convention, was a member of the 1920-24 national Republican advisory council of 100, and a state elector at large in 1924. She also served as state director for the suffrage campaign.

She delivered the dedicatory address at the unveiling of the monument to the World war veterans in Charleston on November 11, 1925.

== Personal life ==
In 1894, she married George Poffenbarger, a prominent lawyer who later served many years on the West Virginia Supreme Court of Appeals; they had two sons, Nathan and Perry. Her brother, John Simpson, was a dean of the West Virginia University medical school. She died on January 27, 1937 in Charleston, West Virginia.
