= Duffau, Texas =

Coordinates: 32°04′57″N 98°01′17″W

Duffau (/dəˈfoʊ/ də-FOH) is a ghost town in Erath County, Texas, United States.

== Photo gallery ==
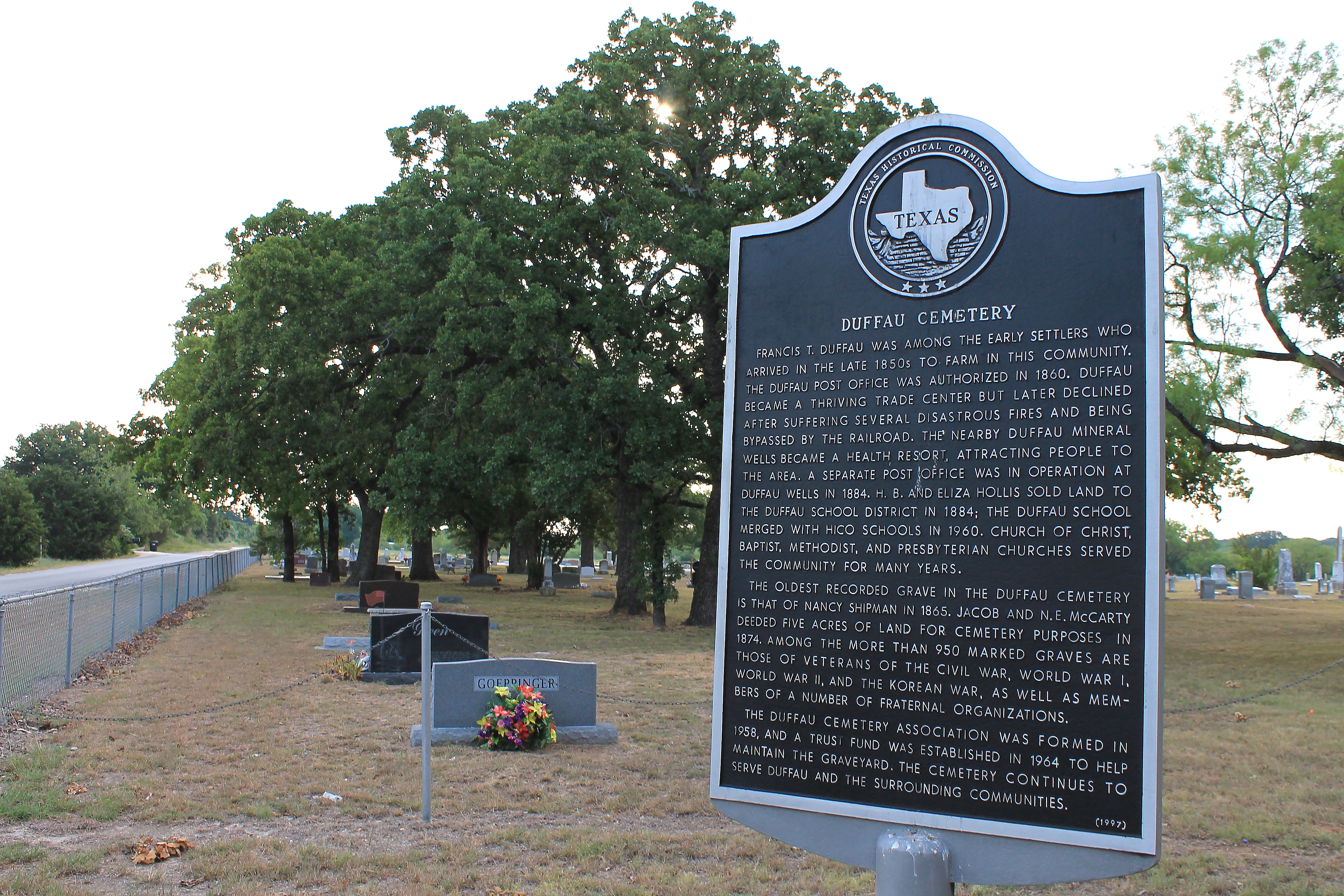
Duffau cemetery sign

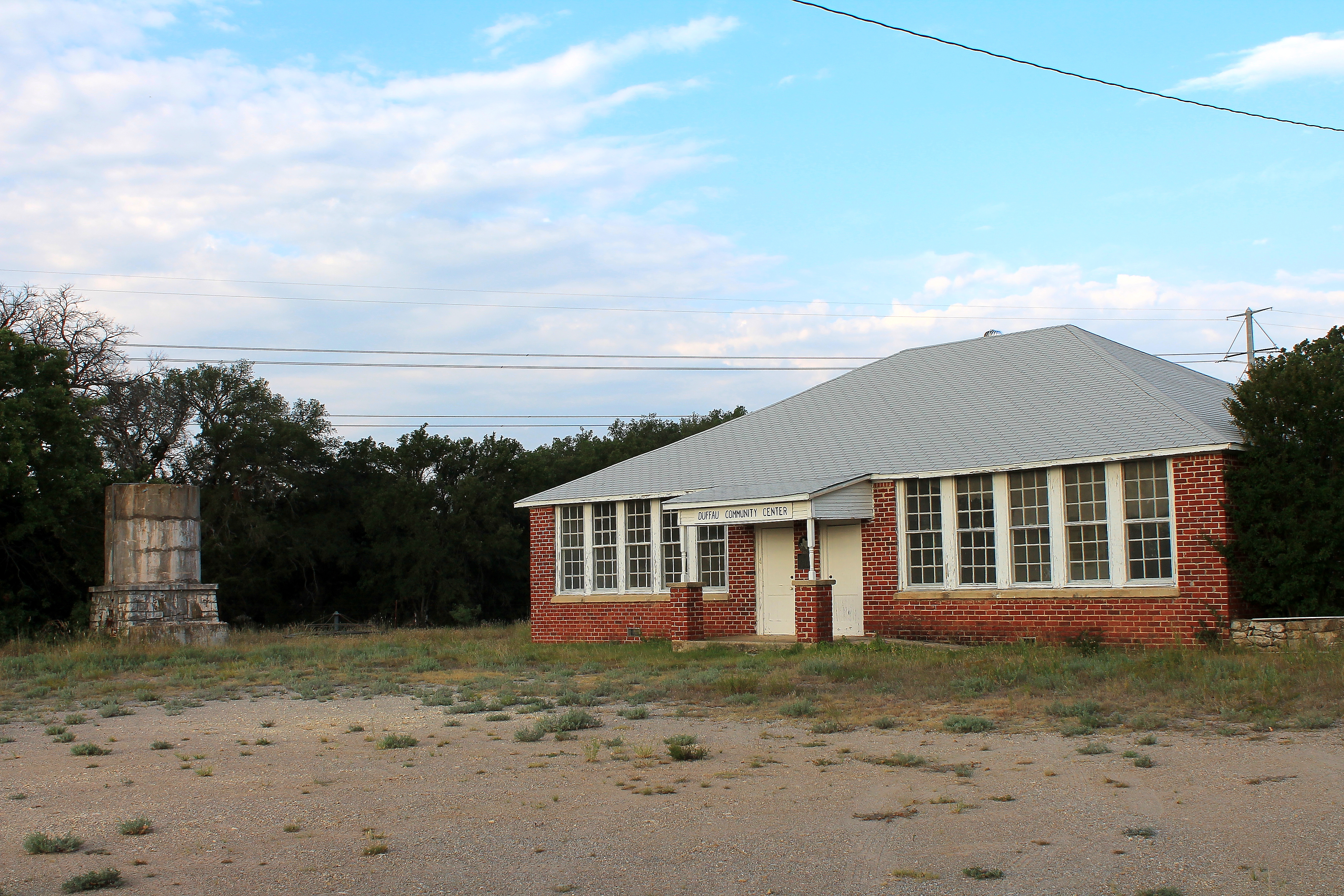
Duffau community center

== See also ==
- List of ghost towns in Texas
- List of ghost towns in the United States
