= Phi Kappa Psi =

American collegiate fraternity

- ΦΚΨ
- Founded: February 19, 1852; 174 years ago Jefferson College
- Type: Social
- Affiliation: NIC
- Status: Active
- Scope: National (United States)
- Motto: Conjugati Amicitia, Vindicate Honore, Et Ducti Vero, Vivimus et Vigemus "United by friendship, Sustained by honor, And led by truth, We live and flourish"
- Slogan: The Great Joy of Serving Others
- Member badge

- Pledge pin
- Colors: Primary: Cardinal Red; Hunter Green; Secondary: Gold Blue Gray
- Flag
- Publication: The Shield
- Philanthropy: Hunter's Fund
- Chapters: 90
- Colonies: 7
- Members: 6,000 active 147,000+ lifetime
- Nickname: Phi Psi
- Headquarters: Laurel Hall; 5395 Emerson Way; Indianapolis, Indiana 46226; United States
- Website: Official website

Phi Kappa Psi (ΦΚΨ), commonly known as Phi Psi, is an American collegiate social fraternity that was founded at Jefferson College in Canonsburg, Pennsylvania in 1852. The fraternity has over ninety chapters at accredited four-year colleges and universities throughout the United States. More than 179,000 men have been initiated into Phi Kappa Psi since its founding. Phi Kappa Psi and Phi Gamma Delta, both founded at the same college, form the Jefferson Duo.

== History ==
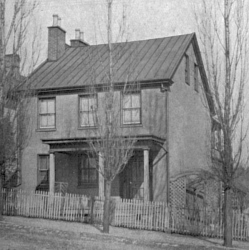
The Letterman home, where Phi Kappa Psi was founded

In the winter of 1850, a typhoid fever epidemic hit Jefferson College in Canonsburg, Pennsylvania. Many students left school. Among those who remained were William Henry Letterman and Charles Page Thomas Moore. They chose to care for their classmates who were stricken with the contagious disease, and a strong bond was formed.

The following school year, Letterman and Moore decided to found a fraternity based on "the great joy of serving others" that they experienced during the epidemic. Letterman and Moore founded Phi Kappa Psi in Widow Letterman's home on the campus of Jefferson College in Canonsburg, Pennsylvania on February 19, 1852.

The fraternity's first Grand Arch Council convened in 1853 in Charlottesville, Virginia. At the 1885 Grand Arch Council in Columbus, Ohio, a special committee was created to draft a new constitution. The fraternity also decided to prohibit chapters from honorary initiations. The new constitution was ratified at the 1886 Grand Arch Council in Indianapolis, Indiana.

In 1894 in New York City, the Arch Grand Council passed a resolution to oppose hazing for its undergraduate members, becoming the first fraternity to publicly oppose hazing. The Grand Arch Council adopted the Phi Kappa Psi Creed in 1964.

== Symbols ==
The coat of arms as adopted in 1908 has a sable (black) field, but today it is most often seen as shown in the adjacent infobox. The fraternity's official colors are Cardinal Red and Hunter Green. The badge is a textured bordered shield with a lamp resting on a book at the bottom and an eye surrounded by two stars at the top. In the center of the shield are the Greek letters Φ, Κ, and Ψ.

The fraternity flag is in the proportions of eight and one-half feet wide by six feet high; it was designed in 1916 following instructions from the Grand Arch Council.

The colors are the official fraternity colors and the design is three vertical stripes of equal width, a hunter green in the middle, flanked on either side by a cardinal red stripe. A smaller version is available with proportions roughly three and one-half feet wide by two feet high. The fraternity song is "Amici". Its root dates back to the traditional song "Annie Lisle".

== Governance ==
=== Executive Council ===
The Executive Council of Phi Kappa Psi is composed of the President, Vice President, Secretary, Treasurer, and six Archons. Since its founding, Phi Kappa Psi has been controlled by undergraduates. This unique system of governance is achieved by a governing body, the Executive Council, which is made up of a majority of elected undergraduates. These undergraduates, known as Archons, represent the six Districts of Phi Kappa Psi, which divide the nation into roughly equal parts based on the number of chapters represented. Archons are elected during meetings of each District during District Councils, held during odd-numbered years. Four alumni also serve on the Executive Council and are elected at Grand Arch Councils, held during even-numbered years.

=== Grand Chapters ===
Phi Kappa Psi's first form of government centered on a Grand Chapter. One chapter at a time was designated the Grand Chapter, and it was responsible for governing the national fraternity. This lasted until 1886 when a new constitution changed to the current form of government.

In 1992, Phi Kappa Psi began to award one exceptional chapter with the Grand Chapter Award. Its name is derived from the fraternity's first form of government. This award was initially granted biennially at Grand Arch Councils. 2001 marked the first time that this award was granted in an odd-numbered year, and it has been an annual award ever since.

=== Grand Arch Councils ===
The supreme governing body of Phi Kappa Psi is the Grand Arch Council (G.A.C.). The first Grand Arch Council convened in 1853 in Charlottesville, Virginia. The council met at an irregular schedule until an entirely new form of government was ratified in 1886. Beginning in 1888, nearly all G.A.C.s have occurred biennially, except 1944 which was canceled due to World War II and 2020 which was canceled due to the COVID-19 epidemic.

=== The Order of the S.C. ===
The Order of the S.C. was formed in 1920 at the Grand Arch Council to recognize the most loyal of alumni. It regarded by Phi Kappa Psi as a "fraternity within a fraternity". Entrance can only be gained by performing, to the satisfaction of the Order, one or more acts of benefit to the fraternity and attending at least seven Grand Arch Councils. The Order meets every two years, during Phi Kappa Psi's biennial Grand Arch Council. The words which the initials "S.C." represent are held secret by its members.

== Phi Kappa Psi Foundation ==
Organized in 1914, the Phi Kappa Psi Foundation is a 501(c)(3) nonprofit, public educational foundation. It funds scholarships, grants, fellowships, and assistantships for Phi Psis and other students across the country.

== Chapters ==
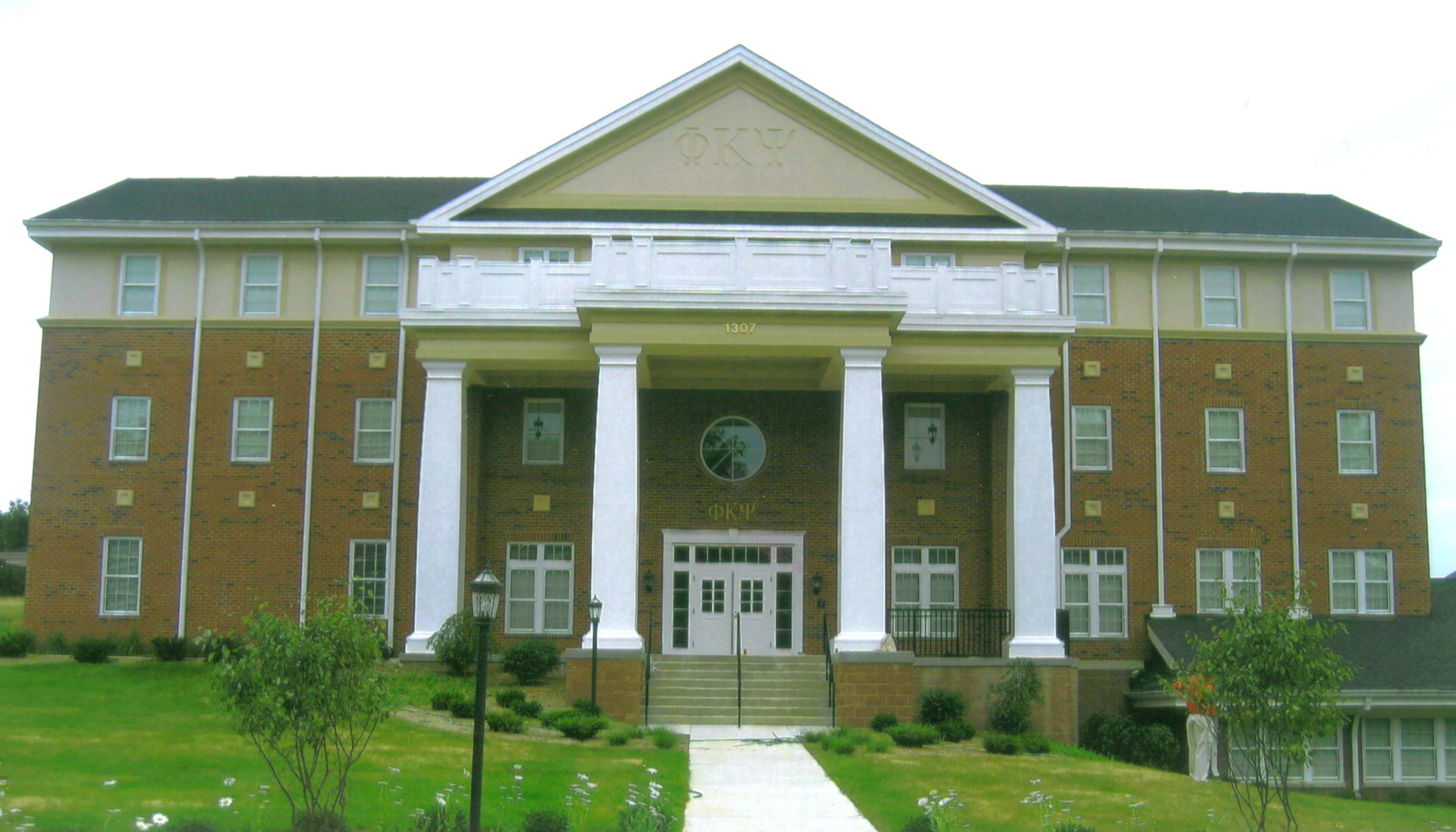
Phi Psi chapter house at Purdue University

The Phi Kappa Psi Fraternity is composed of chapters and alumni associations, the former of which is the scope of this section. Each chapter is chartered to an individual host institution. These host institutions must be accredited four-year degree-granting colleges and universities in a state, province, territory, or federal district of Canada or the United States. To date, chapter charters have only been granted to groups at U.S. institutions.

When Phi Kappa Psi is extending to an institution that does not currently have a chapter, a probationary group called a "colony" is formed. After the criteria are met, that colony receives its charter and becomes a chapter.

A chapter becomes inactive when it relinquishes its charter, or the charter is revoked by the fraternity.

=== Chapter naming convention ===
The chapter naming convention is composed of the top-level subnational division of that chapter's host institution, and a Greek letter in alphabetical order from when the charter was originally issued. For example, the first Phi Psi chapter is from Jefferson College in Canonsburg, Pennsylvania. The first letter in the Greek alphabet is Alpha. Hence, the chapter name is Pennsylvania Alpha. The second chapter, and the first in Virginia, was installed at the University of Virginia, so it is the Virginia Alpha chapter. The third chapter overall, and the second in Virginia, was installed at Washington & Lee University, so it is the Virginia Beta chapter. The George Washington University chapter is the only chapter ever chartered in the District of Columbia, so it is the District of Columbia Alpha chapter.

If borders change, the chapter name does not. Virginia Delta was chartered at Bethany College in 1859. After the Civil War, Bethany College was in West Virginia, but the chapter remained Virginia Delta.

Chapters are named based on when the charter is granted, not when it is installed. As a result, there have been rare instances when the chapter naming convention may not appear to be consistent with the charter dates. For example, four charters have been granted in Iowa; the second granted was the fourth installed, so Iowa Beta was installed after Iowa Gamma and Iowa Delta.

== Membership ==
An active member of the fraternity is a full-time enrolled student at his chapter's host institution at the undergraduate, graduate, or post-graduate level; all others, including members who have graduated or transferred to a school without a Phi Psi chapter, are considered alumni. Men may be initiated into Phi Kappa Psi either by an active chapter, or as part of a colony that is being installed as a chapter. Members typically join Phi Kappa Psi when a chapter extends an offer to enter into a probationary period known as pledgeship, which within the organization, and per National guidelines lasts no more than 6 weeks and concludes with initiation.

Membership is normally only granted to men who are enrolled as full-time students at a chapter's host institution. There have been three exceptions to this:

1. Alumni of a colony which became a chapter after their graduation, and for two years after.
2. Men who have been of service to a chapter, but not students at the institution.
3. Honorary membership extended to men of prominence, a practice that was banned in 1885.

== Chapter and member misconduct ==
- In 1984, Liz Seccuro was drugged and raped at the Phi Kappa Psi house on the University of Virginia campus. William Beebe, who was not a member of the fraternity, pled guilty to sexual battery in 2007, following a written confession he had made to Seccuro as part of his Alcoholics Anonymous program. Two others were implicated during an investigation of the Beebe case. They retained legal counsel and invoked the Fifth Amendment when questioned before a grand jury and were ultimately not charged.
- In a 2009 incident, members were accused of stealing University of Arizona student newspapers that contained a news story about a student who alleged that she had been drugged with GHB and possibly raped while blacked out at a house party. The homework of two chapter members was found at the same location where the stolen newspapers were discarded. Emails from friends and relatives of Phi Kappa Psi members confirmed that the theft had been organized by the fraternity's leadership to stop the spreading of the allegations.
- In 2013, West Virginia University placed its chapter on suspension following an alleged hazing incident. According to the Morgantown Police Department, a 19-year-old pledge was pushed against a wall and suffered a split chin and broken teeth while doing push-ups and other hazing rituals. After a joint investigation by both the university and the national fraternity, the chapter house was closed and the chapter was suspended for five semesters.
- In 2014, Brown University suspended its Phi Kappa Psi chapter after two female students reported that they rapidly became intoxicated at the fraternity's party and tested positive for the date rape drug GHB. Chapter officials disputed the test results and a subsequent investigation by the university showed that the results were inconclusive for the presence of GHB due to errors in laboratory procedures. In 2016, the female students sued the university for intentionally mishandling the case because a Brown University trustee's son was accused of drugging them with plans to sexually assault them.
- In 2017, Matthew Ellis, a Phi Kappa Psi pledge at Texas State University, attended a fraternity event and was found unresponsive in an off-campus apartment complex the next morning. Ellis' death led the university suspend all Greek activities on campus soon after. The chapter of Phi Kappa Psi at Texas State University had been put on suspension by the national organization a week earlier for unrelated violations. The local police placed the fraternity under investigation to determine the cause of his death.
- In 2020, Cornell University "permanently revoked" recognition of its chapter of Phi Kappa Psi nearly a year after a freshman student was found dead in a gorge after leaving an illegal Christmas-themed "dirty rush" party in October 2019.
- In 2025, four members of the San Diego State University chapter faced several charges in relation to an incident the previous February. The members allegedly performed a skit where a pledge had his legs set on fire, resulting in burns to 16% of his body. The burned pledge was among the four people charged.

== University of Virginia gang rape hoax ==
In a since-retracted November 2014 article in Rolling Stone, Sabrina Erdely reported in detail allegations of a 2012 gang rape, and reported in brief on allegations of two subsequent gang rapes at the University of Virginia. Following the story the fraternity voluntarily suspended activity there. Rolling Stone apologized for the article, and after investigating the accusations, Phi Kappa Psi, ABC News, and The Washington Post said they had found significant discrepancies in the account.

On January 12, the University of Virginia reinstated the Phi Kappa Psi fraternity after the police investigation concluded that no incident had occurred at the fraternity. On April 5, 2015, Rolling Stone formally retracted the story. Sabrina Erdely publicly apologized for the article on the same day. The next day, leaders of the Phi Kappa Psi chapter announced the fraternity would file a lawsuit against Rolling Stone over the article. Rolling Stone has settled the case and paid the Phi Kappa Psi chapter at the University of Virginia $1.65 million.

== See also ==
- List of social fraternities and sororities
