= George Poffenbarger =

American judge

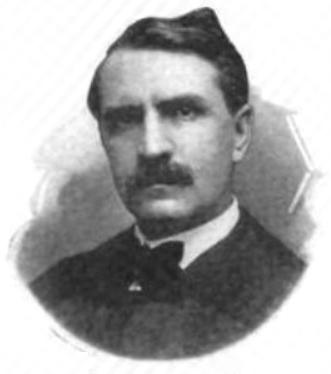

Justice of the Supreme Court of Appeals of West Virginia
- In office 1900–1922

Personal details
- Born: November 24, 1861 Mason County, Virginia, U.S.
- Died: March 20, 1951 (aged 89) Charleston, West Virginia, U.S.
- Party: Republican
- Spouse: Livia Nye Simpson (m. 1894; died 1937)
- Children: 2
- Education: Rio Grande College
- Occupation: Lawyer, judge

George Poffenbarger (November 24, 1861 – March 20, 1951) was a lawyer and long-time justice of the West Virginia Supreme Court of Appeals. He attended Rio Grande College in Rio Grande, Ohio and then taught school for seven years. After studying law under John W. English, a future West Virginia Supreme Court justice, he was admitted to the bar in 1887. After serving as a justice of the peace for two years, he was elected sheriff of Mason County in 1888. In 1900 he was elected to the Supreme Court of Appeals, defeating his mentor John English in the election. He was re-elected in 1912 and resigned in 1922, having served for 21 years.

Poffenbarger married newspaper publisher Livia Nye Simpson in 1894; she died in 1937. They had two sons, Nathan (1898-1962) and Perry (1899-1997).

He died at his home in Charleston on March 20, 1951.
